= Özdemir cabinet =

State government of Baden-Württemberg

Cabinet of Cem Özdemir Cabinet Özdemir
- 26th Cabinet of Baden-Württemberg
- 2026–
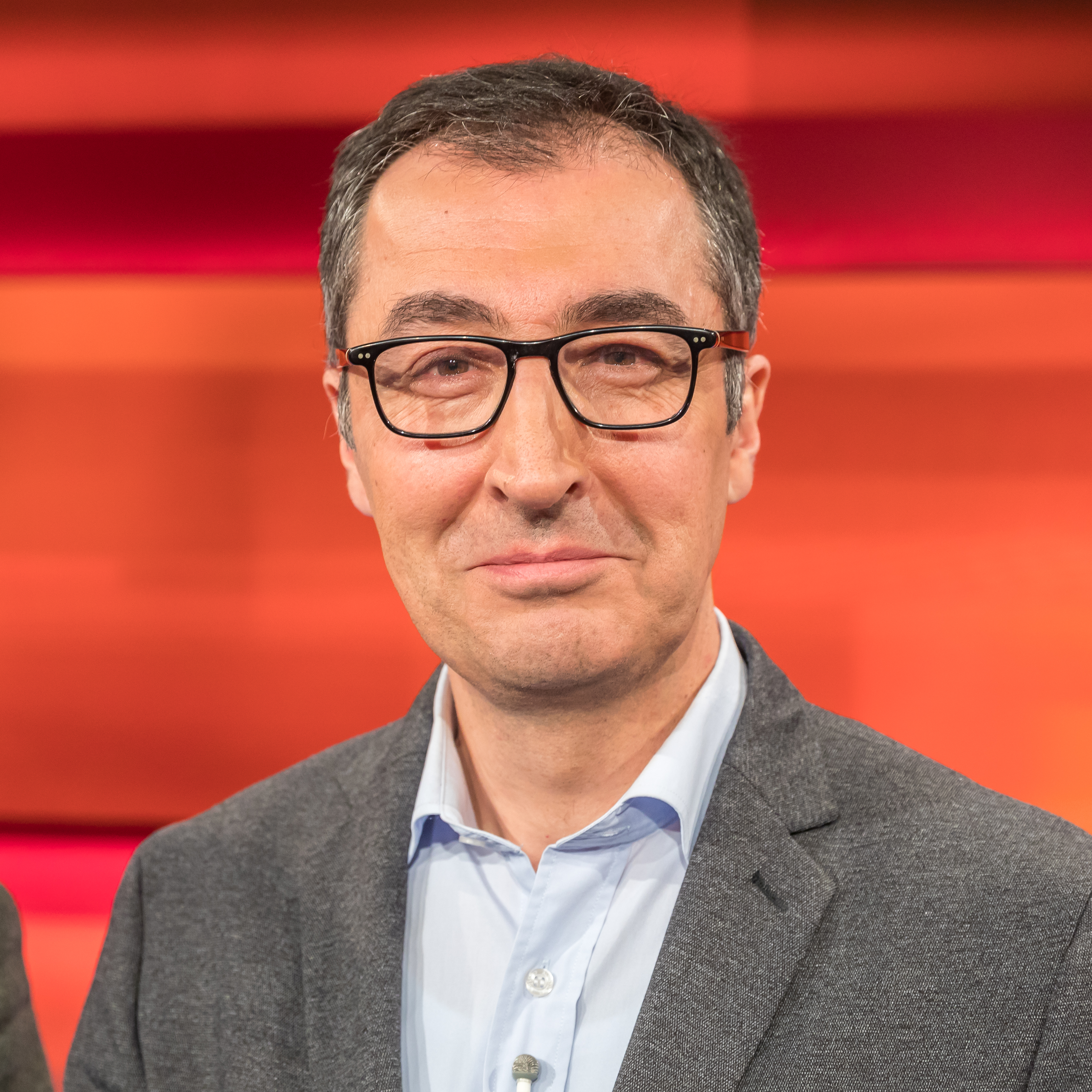
- Cem Özdemir
- Date formed: 13 May 2026

People and organisations
- Minister-President: Cem Özdemir
- Deputy Minister-President: Manuel Hagel
- No. of ministers: 12 (plus 2 state secretaries)
- Member parties: Alliance 90/The Greens Christian Democratic Union
- Status in legislature: Coalition government (Majority)
- Opposition parties: Alternative for Germany Social Democratic Party

History
- Election: 2026 state election
- Legislature term: 18th Landtag
- Predecessor: Kretschmann III

The Özdemir cabinet is the 26th and the current state government of Baden-Württemberg. It took office on 13 May 2026 after Alliance 90/The Greens lead candidate Cem Özdemir, a former federal minister in the Scholz Cabinet and a former federal co-chair of the Greens, was elected as Minister-President of Baden-Württemberg by the Landtag of Baden-Württemberg with support from legislators from his own party and of the Christian Democratic Union, securing 93 of the 157 votes available.

The formation of the Özdemir cabinet extended the lifespan of the first (and to date the only) Green-led state government in Germany, commenced on May 12, 2011 by his predecessor Winfried Kretschmann. It was also the Greens' first successful transfer of party leadership while retaining government leadership.

== Composition ==
The 2026 Baden-Württemberg state election concluded with the two governing parties remaining the two largest parties. While the Greens again secured the most votes, the CDU achieved substantial gains and tied the Greens on seat count. Together the two parties command a super-majority of over 70% of the seats in the state parliament. The two parties conducted coalition talk in late March and early April 2026, and formally entered into a 160-page long coalition agreement on May 11, 2026, continuing a decade-old governing kiwi coalition that started with the Second Kretschmann cabinet.

The Özdemir cabinet consists of equal numbers of members of the Alliance 90/The Greens and the Christian Democratic Union, reflecting the equal parliamentary strength of the two parties. The CDU gained control of the key eduacation portfolio from the Greens, cabinet rank with voting right for one of its state secretaries, and an additional political junior minister at the interior ministry headed by its party leader Manuel Hagel. Furthermore, the CDU traded the regional development ministry for the transport ministry, with incumbent regional development minister Nicole Razavi, a vocal supporter of the contentious Stuttgart 21 project and a harsh critic of retiring transport minister Winfried Hermann (who held the transport portfolio for the previous 15 years), assuming the transport portfolio in the new government. The CDU reportedly aggressively sought the finance portfolio, but Özdemir held firm in rebuffing the demand, preserving the portfolio for his key confidant Danyal Bayaz. In addition to relinquishing the education portfolio, the Greens also eliminated a state secretary position it previously held at the regional development ministry. In total, Green members heads five ministries plus the state chancellery while CDU members head six ministries. The two parties each hold seven junior ministerial position, with one CDU junior minister holding the rank of Ministerialdirektor (historically a lower rank than Staatsminister), a title usually held by the senior civil servant of a ministry.

At its formation, four Green ministers and three CDU ministers (which included all six women in the cabinet) were incumbent ministers who continued their service from the predecessor Third Kretschmann cabinet, with four of the seven ministers retaining their cabinet portfolios. Three CDU ministers (including party leader Manuel Hagel, the cabinet's youngest member) and one Green minister joined the cabinet with no previous cabinet or junior ministerial experience, though all four have served in either the federal parliament or the state parliament since at least 2021.

In addition to the 12 portfolio ministers, state secretaries Rudi Hoogvliet of the Greens (in the State Chancellery) and Siegfried Lorek of the CDU (in the Ministry of Justice) are also voting members of the cabinet and associate members of the German Bundesrat. Both served as state secretaries in the Third Kretschmann cabinet, with Hoogvliet having attained cabinet rank in the previous cabinet. The Özdemir cabinet eliminated position of State Councillor for Civil Society and Civic Participation, held previously by independent politician Barbara Bosch, and the two non-voting seats, each held by a state secretary from the two coalition partners.

Four of the seven Greens' state secretary were incumbent state secretaries, and one other having previously served in such a role. Of the seven CDU state secretaries, Lorek was the only one with previous ministerial experience.

The Özdemir cabinet is the first government in Germany to be led by a person of Turkish background. In addition to the Minister-President, finance minister Danyal Bayaz is of Turkish descent.

== Ministers ==
Portfolio	Minister	Party	Tenure		State secretaries
Portfolio	Minister	Party	Start	End	State secretaries
Minister-President; State Chancellery	Cem Özdemir b. 21 December 1965 (age 60)	GRÜNE	May 13, 2026	Incumbent	Rudi Hoogvliet (Note: cabinet member with voting right) (State Secretary for Media Policy and Representative to the Federal Government) Florian Haßler (State Secretary for Political; Coordination and International Affairs) Jörg Krauss (Minister of State and Head of the State Chancellery)
Deputy Minister-President Minister for Interior, Digitalisation and Europe	Manuel Hagel b. 1 May 1988 (age 38)	CDU	May 13, 2026	Incumbent	Cornelia von Loga (State Secretary for Digitization and Europe) Elmar Steinbacher (Note: civil servant holding state secretary rank) (State Secretary for Government Coordination) Reiner Moser (State Secretary for police affairs and civil protection) Ronja Kemmer (Ministerial Director (Note: Ministerialdirektor, analogous to undersecretary in this case; in other ministries the title is held by the senior civil servant of the ministry, analogous to a permanent secretary) and Chief Digital Officer)
Minister for Finance	Danyal Bayaz b. 15 October 1983 (age 43)	GRÜNE	May 12, 2021	Incumbent	Andrea Lindlohr
Minister for Education, Youth and Sport	Andreas Jung b. 12 January 1975 (age 51)	CDU	May 13, 2026	Incumbent	Andreas Deuschle
Minister for Science, Research and Arts	Petra Olschowski b. 28 March 1967 (age 59)	GRÜNE	Sep 28, 2022	Incumbent	Nese Erikli
Minister for Environment, Climate and Energy Industry	Thekla Walker b. 28 March 1969 (age 57)	GRÜNE	May 12, 2021	Incumbent	Andre Baumann
Minister for Economics, Labour and Tourism	Nicole Hoffmeister-Kraut b. 9 October 1972 (age 54)	CDU	May 12, 2021	Incumbent	Thomas Dörflinger
Minister for Social Affairs, Health and Integration	Oliver Hildenbrand b. 15 April 1986 (age 40)	GRÜNE	May 13, 2026	Incumbent	Petra Krebs
Minister for Food, Rural Areas and Consumer Protection	Marion Gentges b. 23 August 1971 (age 55)	CDU	May 13, 2026	Incumbent	Sarah Schweizer
Minister for Justice and Migration	Moritz Oppelt b. 24 February 1988 (age 38)	CDU	May 13, 2026	Incumbent	Siegfried Lorek
Minister for Transport	Nicole Razavi b. 20 May 1965 (age 61)	CDU	May 13, 2026	Incumbent	Raimund Haser
Minister for Regional; Development and Housing	Theresa Schopper b. 9 April 1961 (age 65)	GRÜNE	May 13, 2026	Incumbent	

== Vote in the Landtag ==
Stuttgart, 13 May 2026 – Total seats: 157 – Absolute majority required: 79
Ballot	Candidate	Vote type	Count	Share	Nominated by
1st ballot	Cem Özdemir (Greens)	Yes	93	59.2%	Greens–CDU
1st ballot	Cem Özdemir (Greens)	No	26	16.6%	Greens–CDU
1st ballot	Cem Özdemir (Greens)	Abstain	4	2.5%	Greens–CDU
1st ballot	Manuel Hagel (CDU)	Yes	34	21.7%	AfD
Cem Özdemir was thereby elected Minister-President of Baden-Württemberg.
