= Michael Bloss =

German politician (born 1986)

Michael Bloss MEP
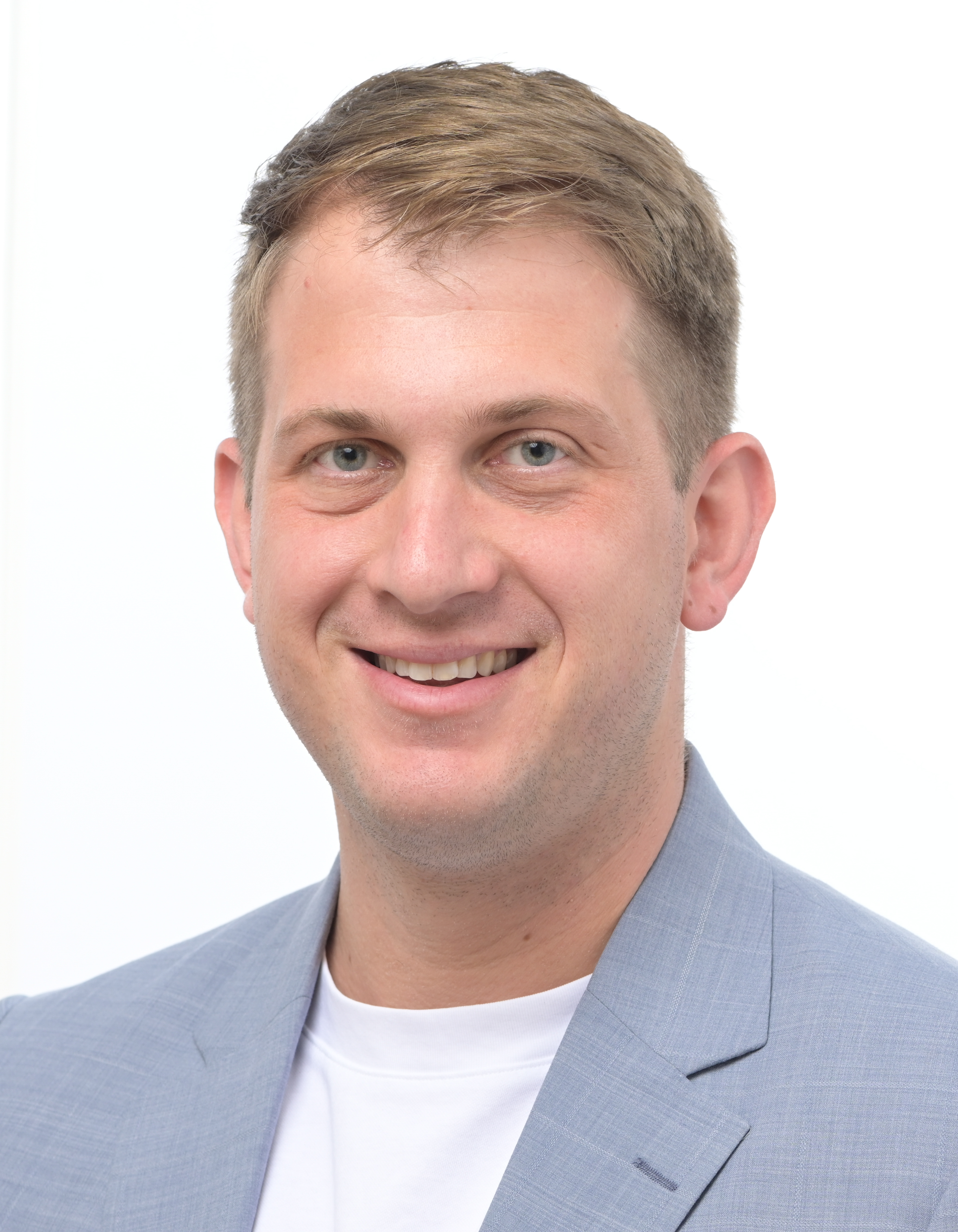

Member of the European Parliament for Germany
- Incumbent
- Assumed office 2 July 2019

Personal details
- Born: 6 November 1986 (age 39)
- Party: German; Alliance 90/The Greens; EU; European Green Party
- Education: TU Dresden; SOAS University of London; University of Dar es Salaam; University of Vienna

Michael Bloss (born 6 November 1986) is a German politician of the Alliance 90/The Greens who has been serving as a Member of the European Parliament since 2019.

== Political career ==
Bloss has been a Member of the European Parliament since the 2019 European elections. He has since been serving on the Committee on Industry, Research and Energy. In this capacity, he was the parliament's rapporteur on the EU Carbon Border Adjustment Mechanism in 2022. In addition to his committee assignments, he is part of the Parliament's delegation for relations with the United States. In this capacity, he serves as his parliamentary group’s rapporteur on the European Green Deal.

In the negotiations to form a coalition government under the leadership of Minister-President of Baden-Württemberg Winfried Kretschmann following the 2021 state elections, Bloss was a member of the working group on climate, environmental policy and energy, co-chaired by Sandra Detzer and Andreas Jung.

In the negotiations to form a so-called traffic light coalition of the Social Democratic Party (SPD), the Green Party and the Free Democratic Party (FDP) following the 2021 federal elections, Bloss was part of his party's delegation in the working group on climate protection and energy policy, co-chaired by Matthias Miersch, Oliver Krischer and Lukas Köhler.

In the negotiations to form a coalition government under the leadership of Cem Özdemir following the 2026 state elections in Baden-Württemberg, Bloss was part of his party's delegation in the working group on climate, environmental policy and energy, co-chaired by Thekla Walker and Raimund Haser.

== Political positions ==
In 2020, Bloss criticized the European Commission that its draft hydrogen strategy used studies commissioned by gas industry groups to assess the potential of blue hydrogen.

In May 2021, Bloss joined a group of 39 mostly Green Party lawmakers from the European Parliament who in a letter urged the leaders of Germany, France and Italy not to support Arctic LNG 2, a $21 billion Russian Arctic liquefied natural gas (LNG) project, due to climate change concerns.
