= Third Kretschmann cabinet =

State government of Baden-Württemberg

Third Cabinet of Winfried Kretschmann Cabinet Kretschmann III
- 25th Cabinet of Baden-Württemberg
- 12 May 2021 – 13 May 2026
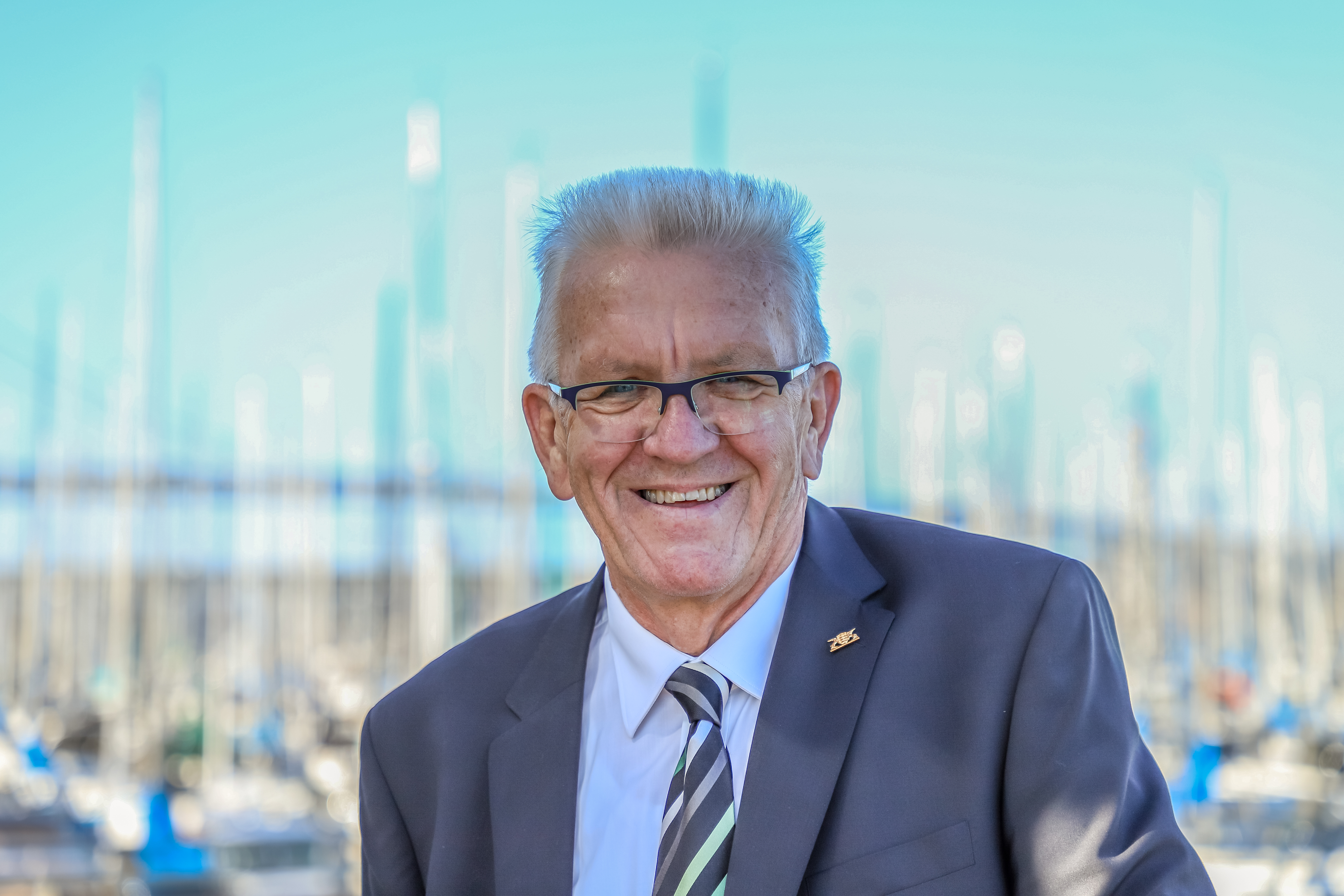
- Winfried Kretschmann in San Francisco in 2018
- Date formed: 12 May 2021
- Date dissolved: 13 May 2026

People and organisations
- Minister-President: Winfried Kretschmann
- Deputy Minister-President: Thomas Strobl
- No. of ministers: 12
- Member parties: Alliance 90/The Greens; Christian Democratic Union
- Status in legislature: Coalition government (Majority)
- Opposition parties: Social Democratic Party; Free Democratic Party; Alternative for Germany

History
- Election: 2021 Baden-Württemberg state election
- Legislature term: 17th Landtag of Baden-Württemberg
- Predecessor: Kretschmann II
- Successor: Özdemir

The third Kretschmann cabinet was the state government of Baden-Württemberg between 2021 and 2026, sworn in on 12 May 2021 after Winfried Kretschmann was elected as Minister-President of Baden-Württemberg by the members of the Landtag of Baden-Württemberg. It is the 25th Cabinet of Baden-Württemberg.

It was formed after the 2021 Baden-Württemberg state election by Alliance 90/The Greens (GRÜNE) and the Christian Democratic Union (CDU). Excluding the Minister-President, the cabinet comprises twelve ministers. Six are members of the Greens, five are members of the CDU, and one is an independent politician.

== Formation ==
The previous cabinet was a coalition government of the Greens and CDU led by Minister-President Winfried Kretschmann of the Greens.

The election took place on 14 March 2021, and resulted in an improvement for the Greens and losses for the CDU. The opposition SPD saw a small decline while the FDP improved, and the AfD took significant losses, falling from third to fifth place. Overall, the governing coalition was returned with an increased majority.

Minister-President Kretschmann invited all parties except the AfD to exploratory talks, beginning with the CDU. On 2 April, the Greens voted to enter negotiations to renew the coalition with the CDU. The two parties presented their coalition pact on 1 May.

Kretschmann was re-elected as Minister-President by the Landtag on 12 May, winning 95 votes out of 152 cast.

== Composition ==
Portfolio	Minister	Party	Took office	Left office	State secretaries
Minister-President; State Chancellery	Winfried Kretschmann born 17 May 1948 (age 77)	GRÜNE	12 May 2021	13 May 2026	Rudi Hoogvliet (Media, Representative to the Federal Government); Florian Haßler (Representative to the European Union); Florian Stegman (Head of the State Chancellery)
Deputy Minister-President Minister for Interior, Digitalisation and Communities	Thomas Strobl born 17 March 1960 (age 66)	CDU	12 May 2021	12 May 2026	Wilfried Klenk; Julian Würtenberger
Minister for Finance	Danyal Bayaz born 15 October 1983 (age 42)	GRÜNE	12 May 2021	13 May 2026	Gisela Splett
Minister for Education, Youth and Sport	Theresa Schopper born 9 April 1961 (age 65)	GRÜNE	12 May 2021	13 May 2026	Sandra Boser; Volker Schebesta
Minister for Science, Research and Arts	Theresia Bauer born 6 April 1965 (age 61)	GRÜNE	12 May 2021	13 May 2026	Petra Olschowski
Minister for Environment, Climate and Energy Industry	Thekla Walker born 28 March 1969 (age 57)	GRÜNE	12 May 2021	13 May 2026	Andre Baumann
Minister for Economics, Labour and Tourism	Nicole Hoffmeister-Kraut born 9 October 1972 (age 53)	CDU	12 May 2021	13 May 2026	Patrick Rapp
Minister for Social Affairs, Health and Integration	Manfred Lucha born 13 March 1961 (age 65)	GRÜNE	12 May 2021	13 May 2026	Ute Leidig
Minister for Food, Rural Areas and Consumer Protection	Peter Hauk born 24 December 1960 (age 65)	CDU	12 May 2021	13 May 2026	Sabine Kurtz
Minister for Justice and Migration	Marion Gentges born 23 August 1971 (age 54)	CDU	12 May 2021	13 May 2026	Siegfried Lorek
Minister for Transport	Winfried Hermann born 19 July 1952 (age 73)	GRÜNE	12 May 2021	13 May 2026	Elke Zimmer
Minister for State Development and Housing	Nicole Razavi born 20 May 1965 (age 60)	CDU	12 May 2021	13 May 2026	Andrea Lindlohr
State Councillor for Civil Society and Civic Participation	Barbara Bosch born 5 September 1958 (age 67)	Ind.	22 July 2021	13 May 2026	
