= Marcel Emmerich =

German politician (born 1991)

Marcel Emmerich MdB
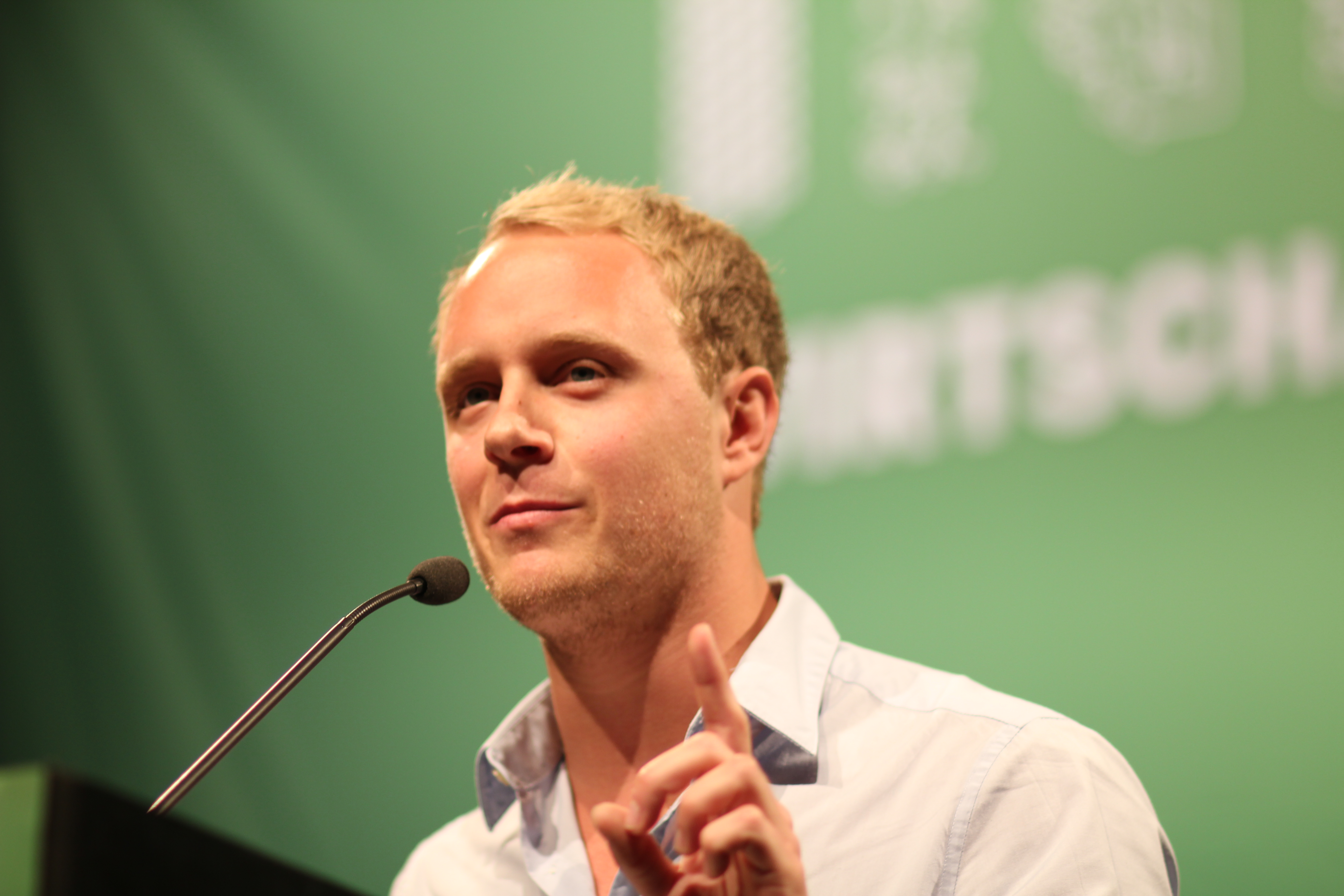
- Emmerich in 2014

Member of the Bundestag
- Incumbent
- Assumed office 1 June 2021
- Preceded by: Danyal Bayaz

Personal details
- Born: 12 May 1991 (age 35) Reutlingen, Baden-Württemberg, Germany
- Party: Alliance '90/The Greens
- Education: University of Würzburg (BA) University of Hagen
- Occupation: Politician
- Website: marcelemmerich.de

Marcel Emmerich (born 12 May 1991) is a German politician of Alliance 90/The Greens who has served as a member of the Bundestag since 2021.

== Early life and education ==
Emmerich was born in Reutlingen.

Emmerich completed his bachelor's degree in Political and Social studies at the University of Würzburg in 2016. He has been studying Political and Administrative sciences at the University of Hagen since 2017.

== Political career ==
=== With Alliance 90/The Greens ===
From 2011 to 2015, Emmerich was the state spokesperson for the Green Youth in Baden-Württemberg. In October 2015 he was elected to the state board of Alliance 90/The Greens in Baden-Württemberg. Since October 2017 he has also been the district chairman of the Ulm Greens.

=== Member of the German Parliament, 2021–present ===
Emmerich moved up on 1 June 2021 as a member of the 19th Bundestag via the state list when Danyal Bayaz resigned. He has since been serving on the Committee on Internal Affairs.

In the negotiations to form a coalition government under the leadership of Cem Özdemir following the 2026 state elections in Baden-Württemberg, Emmerich was part of his party's delegation in the working group on internal affairs, co-chaired by Oliver Hildenbrand and Christian Gehring.

== Other activities ==
- Federal Agency for Civic Education (BPB), Member of the Board of Trustees (since 2022)
- German Federation for the Environment and Nature Conservation (BUND), Member
- Reporters Without Borders (RSF), Member
- VfB Stuttgart, Member
