= 2026 Baden-Württemberg state election =

State election in Germany

- 8 March 2026

All 157 seats in the Landtag of Baden-Württemberg (including 37 overhang and leveling seats) 79 seats needed for a majority
- Turnout: 5,406,852 (69.6%) ▲5.8 pp
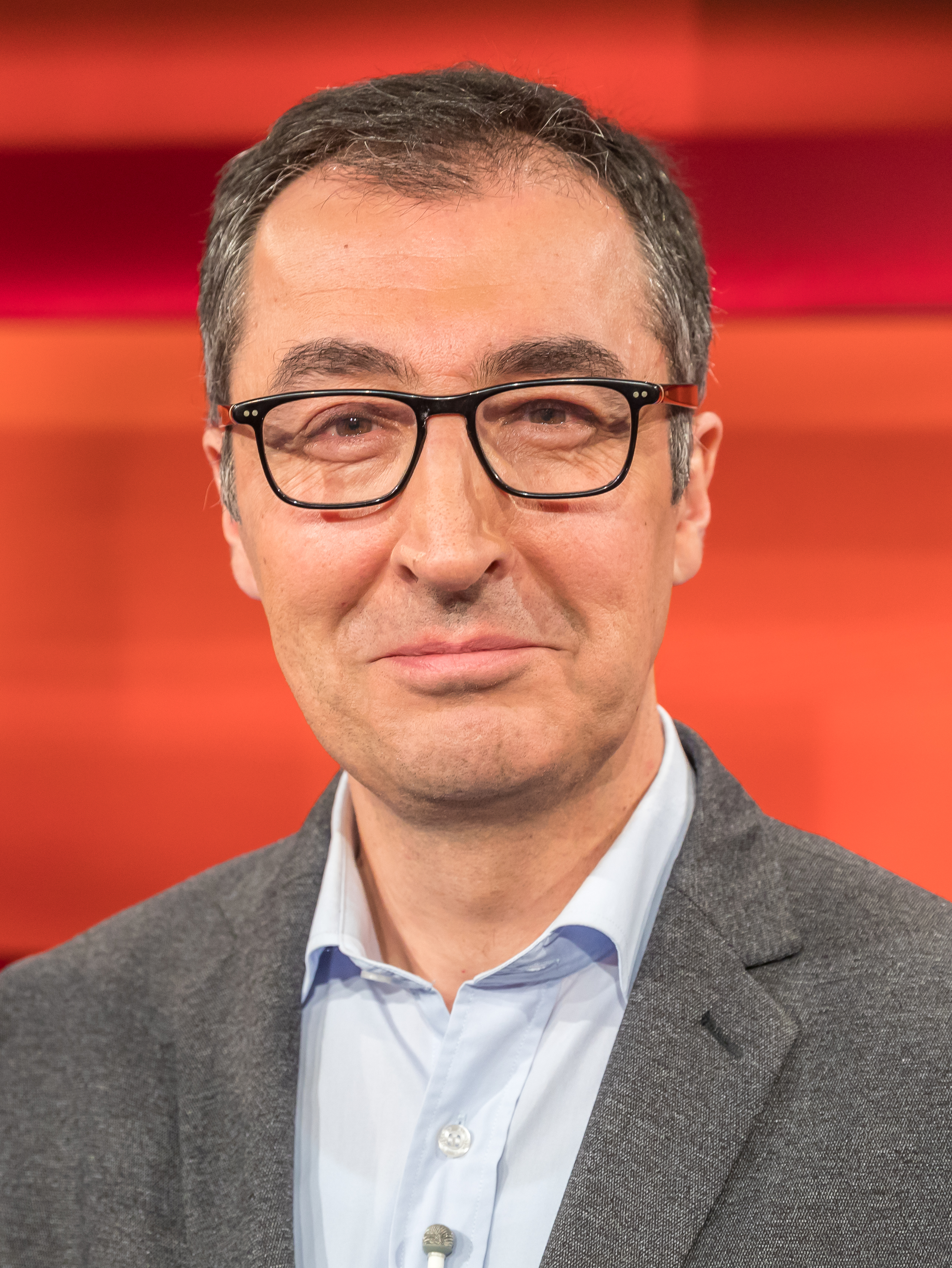

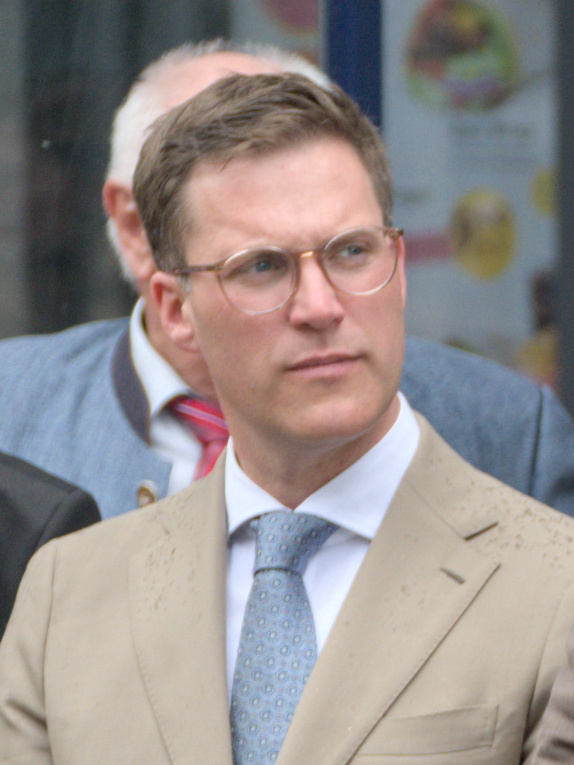

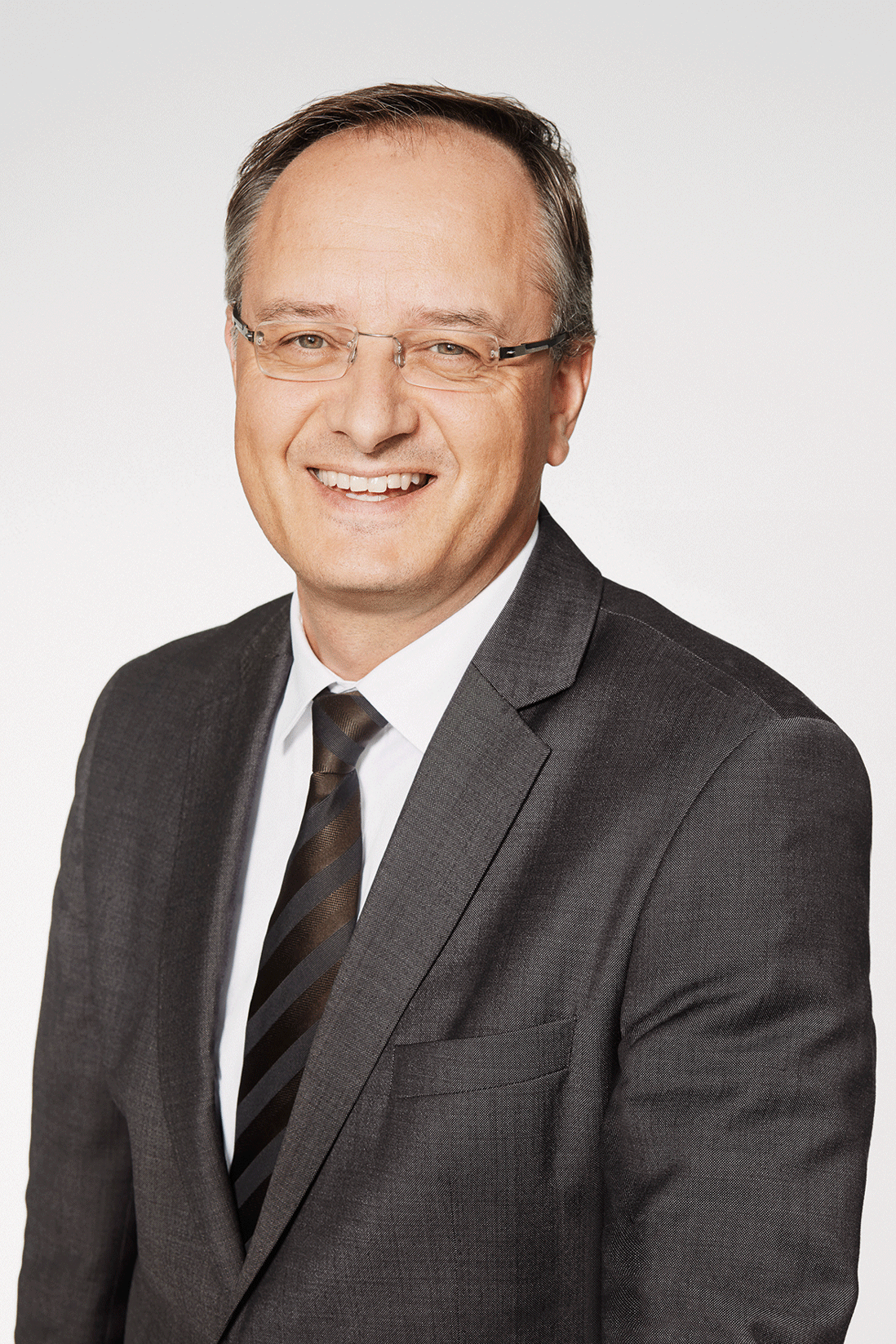

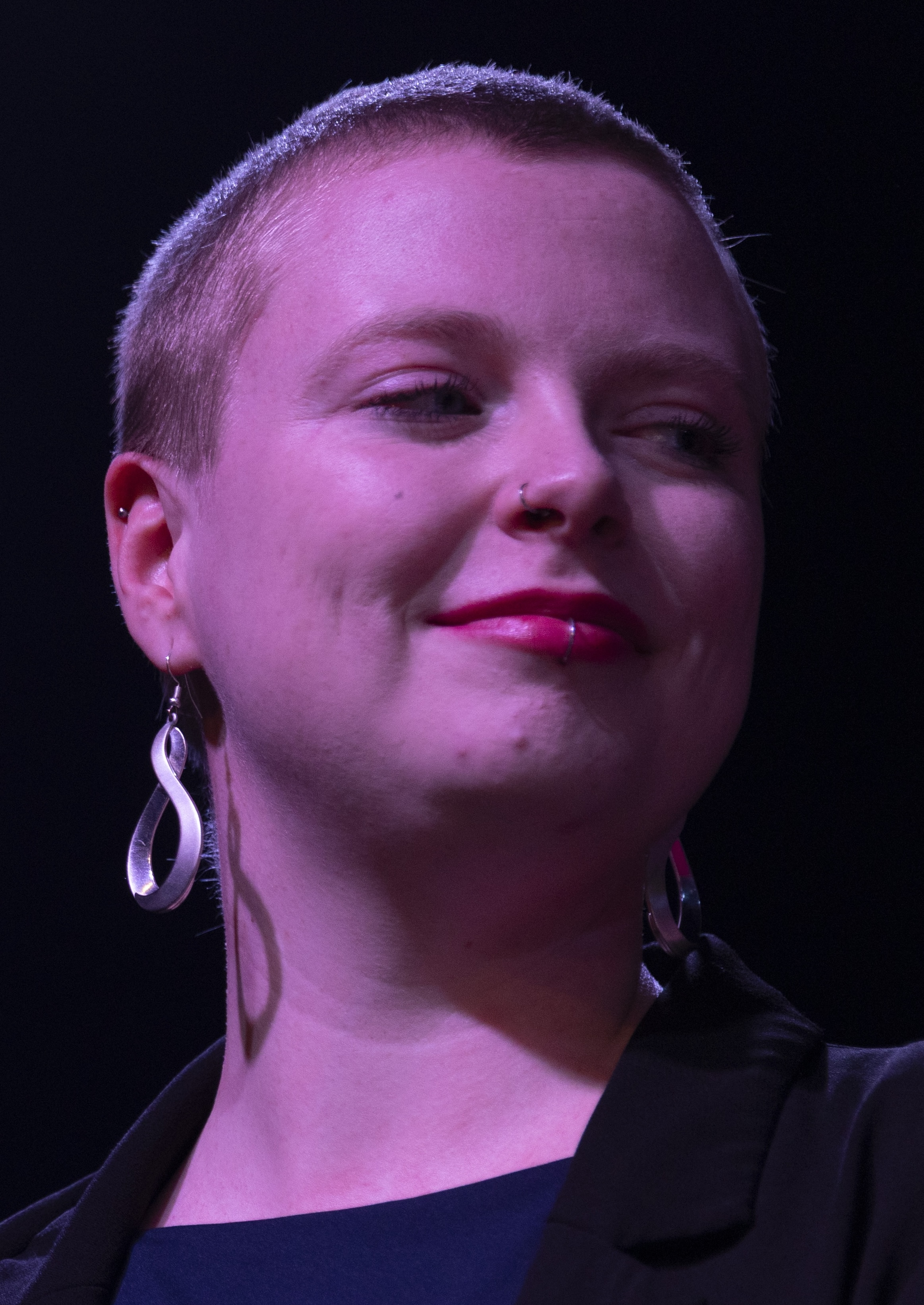

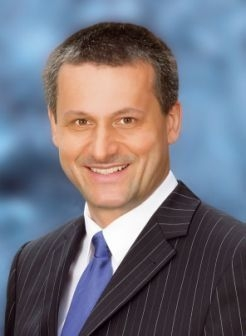
	First party	Second party	Third party
Candidate	Cem Özdemir	Manuel Hagel	Markus Frohnmaier (Note: Minister-President candidate; head of list was Emil Sänze.)
Party	Greens	CDU	AfD
Last election	58 seats, 32.6%	42 seats, 24.1%	17 seats, 9.7%
Seats won	56	56	35
Seat change	▼2	▲14	▲18
Popular vote	1,623,156	1,595,844	1,010,449
Percentage	30.2%	29.7%	18.8%
Swing	▼2.4 pp	▲5.6 pp	▲9.1 pp
	Fourth party	Fifth party	Sixth party
Candidate	Andreas Stoch	Kim Sophie Bohnen	Hans-Ulrich Rülke
Party	SPD	Linke	FDP
Last election	19 seats, 11.0%	0 seats, 3.6%	18 seats, 10.5%
Seats won	10	0	0
Seat change	▼9	Steady	▼18
Popular vote	298,278	237,062	235,599
Percentage	5.5%	4.4%	4.4%
Swing	▼5.5 pp	▲0.8 pp	▼6.1 pp
- Winning candidates in the single-member constituencies
Government before election
Third Kretschmann cabinet
Green–CDU
Government after election
Özdemir cabinet
Green–CDU

The 2026 Baden-Württemberg state election was held on 8 March 2026. The outgoing government was a coalition of Alliance 90/The Greens supported by the Christian Democratic Union (CDU) led by Minister-President Winfried Kretschmann (Greens), who retired at this election.

Defying most polls leading up to the election, the Greens remained the largest party with 30.2% of the vote, only a small decline from the previous election. The CDU gained more than five percentage points and placed a narrow second on 29.7%, with both parties finishing on 56 seats. The Alternative for Germany (AfD) won 18.8% and 35 seats, almost doubling its previous performance. Three other parties, despite polling over the 5% electoral threshold, suffered losses. The Social Democratic Party (SPD) lost half its support and took 5.5% of the vote and 10 seats, the party's worst ever result in a state election since 1945. The Free Democratic Party (FDP) fell below 5% and for the first time lost representation in the state which is considered its stronghold.

The CDU held a lead in polling for much of the period prior to the election, but the Greens gained rapidly during the campaign, which was attributed to Özdemir's personal popularity. The party was also assisted by strategic voting from supporters of parties such as the SPD and The Left (Die Linke), the latter of which failed to clear the electoral threshold.

In absence of other realistic options, both parties declared that they would continue to cooperate. While the CDU and AfD hold a majority between them, the CDU rejects cooperation with the party (firewall policy). The Greens and CDU therefore renewed their coalition, with Özdemir becoming the first Minister-President of Turkish background.

The election was held after modifications to the state's mixed-member proportional representation system, which gave voters two votes – one for a single-member constituency and one for a party list – for the first time. The CDU significantly overperformed in the constituency component, winning 34% of the vote to the Greens' 25% and 56 of the 70 constituencies. This did not affect the relative strength of the parties; however, the large number of overhang and leveling seats awarded resulted in the Landtag expanding to 157 seats, compared to its statutory size of 120.

== Election date ==
The period of the 17th Landtag formally ended on 30 April 2026, as per Article 30, Paragraph 2 of the Baden-Württemberg Constitution, which required the election to take place before the end of the five-year term unless the Landtag was dissolved earlier. On 18 March 2025, Interior Minister Thomas Strobl announced 8 March 2026 as the provisional date for the next election, in accordance with Section 19 of the State Parliament Election Act. On the same day, municipal elections were held in Bavaria.

== Electoral system ==
The Landtag of Baden-Württemberg is elected through mixed-member proportional representation. 70 members are elected in single-member constituencies via first-past-the-post voting. According to a reform law passed in 2022, the remaining seats are allocated using compensatory proportional representation based on the newly introduced second vote, distributed to state-wide party lists in accordance with the Sainte-Laguë method, rather than the previous system of allocating seats to the best-performing unelected constituency candidates (which was known as a Zweitmandat, "second mandate"). This aligned Baden-Württemberg’s system with most other German states and the federal Bundestag election system. The minimum size of the Landtag is 120 seats; however, overhang and leveling seats are added to ensure proportional representation at the state level. In 2021, 154 seats were allocated due to such adjustments. An electoral threshold of 5% of valid votes applies. Additionally, the minimum voting age was lowered to 16 by the 2022 reform.

== Background ==
In the 2021 Baden-Württemberg state election, the Greens, led by Minister-President Winfried Kretschmann, emerged again as the strongest party, now with 32.6% of the vote, marking their best result in any state election nationwide. Their coalition partner, the CDU, achieved its worst-ever result in Baden-Württemberg, dropping to 24.1%. The CDU's leading candidates both were ministers that had not been elected to the Landtag in 2016, and did not win mandates in 2021 either. While Susanne Eisenmann retired from politics, Thomas Strobl returned as minister in the new cabinet, and won a seat only in 2026.

The SPD recorded its lowest-ever result with 11%, but became the strongest of the three opposition parties. The FDP achieved one of its best results with 10.5%. The AfD had entered the state parliament in 2016 as the strongest opposition force, but then showed internal conflicts, suffered significant losses and fell to fifth place with 9.7%. Other parties, including The Left (3.6%), Free Voters (3.0%), and others (5.5%), also participated but did not secure significant representation.

Following the election, discussions focused on either continuing the Green-CDU "Kiwi coalition" or forming a traffic-light coalition with the Greens, SPD, and FDP. On 3 April 2021, the Greens and CDU agreed to begin coalition negotiations. While some Green Party members favored a traffic-light coalition (which later in 2021 was formed on national level), Kretschmann advocated for continuing the Green-CDU coalition, which ultimately prevailed. On 12 May 2021, Kretschmann was re-elected as Minister-President with 95 votes, five fewer than the coalition's total seats, forming the third Kretschmann cabinet.

In April 2022, the state parliament amended the electoral law, moving to a conventional mixed-member proportional system with a second vote and closed lists, as well as lowering the voting age to 16. Winfried Kretschmann has announced he will not seek a fourth term in 2026. Cem Özdemir, a prominent Green politician, declared in 2024 his intention to lead the Greens in Baden-Württemberg and thus did not run in the 2025 German federal election. For the CDU, Manuel Hagel has emerged as the new leader and, according to current polls, has a strong chance of becoming Minister-President in 2026. As the AfD is rejected by all other parties ("firewall"), the CDU would likely need to continue its coalition with the Greens. The 2011 Baden-Württemberg state election took place after the Japanese Tōhoku earthquake and Fukushima Daiichi nuclear disaster led to nuclear power plant shutdowns in Germany, and the outcome confirmed polls that predicted a leadership change from CDU to Greens. In the months before the 2026 election, the CDU had been leading in polls, but the Greens caught up with CDU in final polls.

== Parties ==
The table below lists the five parties that were elected to the 2021 17th Landtag.

No.	Name		Ideology	Leading candidate for 2026	2021 result	
No.	Name		Ideology	Leading candidate for 2026	Votes (%)	Seats
1	Grüne	Alliance 90/The Greens; Bündnis 90/Die Grünen	Green politics	Thekla Walker (headed state list); Cem Özdemir (for Minister-President)	32.6%	57 / 143
2	CDU	Christian Democratic Union of Germany; Christlich Demokratische Union Deutschlands	Christian democracy	Manuel Hagel	24.1%	43 / 143
3	SPD	Social Democratic Party of Germany; Sozialdemokratische Partei Deutschlands	Social democracy	Andreas Stoch	11.0%	19 / 143
4	FDP	Free Democratic Party; Freie Demokratische Partei	Classical liberalism	Hans-Ulrich Rülke	10.5%	18 / 143
5	AfD	Alternative for Germany; Alternative für Deutschland	Right-wing populism	Emil Sänze (headed state list); Markus Frohnmaier (for Minister-President only)	9.7%	17 / 143

In 2026, the lists of 21 parties were approved.

== Leading candidates ==
Cem Özdemir, first elected to the Bundestag for Alliance 90/The Greens in 1994, and who has served as a Member of the European Parliament and Federal Minister but never as a state parliamentarian, announced on October 25, 2024, his intention to run as the Greens' lead candidate in the 2026 Baden-Württemberg state election and to become Minister-President of the state. On 24 May 2025, the state party conference selected him as the lead candidate, with place 2 on the list. The Green Party has a policy of electing only women to odd number list places, starting with Thekla Walker as number 1 on the list. In mid-May 2025, Manuel Hagel was chosen as the CDU's lead candidate for the 2026 state election, while Andreas Stoch was nominated by the SPD. AfD state leader Markus Frohnmaier led his party’s campaign for the state election as the candidate for Minister-President but is not running for a state parliament seat; Emil Sänze headed the AfD’s state list.

=== Debates ===
Local public TV station SWR Fernsehen staged a debate on 24 February 2026 as a "truel" of three candidates, from the parties that poll over 20%. The wording Triell had been introduced before the 2021 German federal election.

=== Cem Özdemir (Greens) ===
Cem Özdemir, the former Federal Minister of Agriculture, was elected as the Green Party’s lead candidate for the 2026 Baden-Württemberg state election with an overwhelming 97 per cent of the vote at the party’s congress in Heidenheim on 24 May 2025. The 59-year-old, born in Bad Urach to Turkish immigrant parents, positioned himself as a pragmatic and experienced politician, aiming to succeed Winfried Kretschmann, who served as Baden-Württemberg’s first Green Minister-President since 2011. Kretschmann praised Özdemir as "cut from the cloth of a minister-president", highlighting his ability to lead the state from day one with a blend of pragmatism, local rootedness, and global perspective. Özdemir’s campaign focused on addressing Baden-Württemberg’s challenges, including the economic impacts of global crises like Russia’s war on Ukraine, the effects of Donald Trump's "America First" policy, and the pressing issues of climate change and biodiversity loss. He advocated for a policy that speaks plainly, confronts reality, and engages citizens on equal terms, emphasising unity and the state’s potential to remain livable and prosperous.

Özdemir’s policy positions centre on ecological transformation as an economic opportunity, particularly for Baden-Württemberg's automotive industry, which he urged to prioritize electromobility and battery production to maintain its competitive edge. At the Unternehmertag of the UBW, he stressed the need for battery manufacturing to stay in the state, describing the car of the future as a "rolling iPhone" and supporting incentives for CO2-neutral technologies. He also criticised the complexity of existing state funding programs, calling for streamlined support to ensure their effectiveness, even expressing openness to reviewing policies from his own Green-led government. Özdemir warned against a leftward shift within the Greens, arguing that the party must remain true to its core as a "bourgeois opposition" and make the market an ally in climate protection, citing the SPD's shift toward transfer recipients as a cautionary tale that pushed workers toward the AfD. Despite his strong personal approval—39 per cent favoured him as minister-president compared to 18 per cent for CDU's Manuel Hagel—the Greens lagged behind the CDU in polls, with 20 to 23 per cent support compared to the CDU's 26 to 31 per cent. Özdemir acknowledged the challenge, pledging to campaign vigorously across the state and warning the CDU against overconfidence, while emphasising a fair and unifying campaign that avoids polarising rhetoric.

=== Manuel Hagel (CDU) ===
Manuel Hagel, the 37-year-old CDU state and parliamentary group leader, was nominated as the CDU’s lead candidate for the 2026 Baden-Württemberg state election with 93.8 per cent of the vote at the party’s congress in Stuttgart on 19 May 2025. Born in Ehingen, Hagel, a trained business economist and family man, aimed to become the next Minister-President, succeeding the Green Party's Winfried Kretschmann, by emphasising a "new bourgeois centre" that would prioritise practical governance and economic vitality. Despite his lower public recognition—only 20 per cent of voters knew him compared to 79 per cent for his Green rival Cem Özdemir—Hagel remained optimistic, supported by Federal Chancellor Friedrich Merz, who saw him as a strong leader for Baden-Württemberg's industry-heavy economy. The CDU held a consistent lead in polls with 26–33 per cent support compared to the Greens' 20–27 per cent, bolstered by the party's perceived competence in economic and security issues.

Hagel's policy platform focuses on modernising the state through bureaucratic streamlining and economic innovation. During a visit to Holzbau Schmäh in Meersburg, he endorsed reducing bureaucratic hurdles, such as lengthy approval processes for heritage conservation, and advocated for free master craftsman and technician training, as well as dual education models combining vocational training with academic qualifications. In a summer interview, he proposed a leaner state administration by introducing sunset clauses for regulations and reforming social welfare systems like the Citizen's Income to prioritise work reintegration. Hagel emphasised affordable energy as critical for industry, supporting lower electricity taxes and gas power plants to ensure supply security. He positioned the CDU as a party of "modern conservatism", rooted in Christian values, social market economy, and a liberal society, while firmly rejecting cooperation with the AfD, which he criticised for its regressive views and threat to Baden-Württemberg's prosperity. Hagel also faced controversy over using the phrase "environmental protection is homeland protection", criticised by The Left Party as a right-wing populist slogan, although the CDU dismissed this as a campaign tactic, affirming Hagel's stance against extremism. Despite his youth, only 10 per cent of voters saw his age as a drawback, with 42 per cent viewing it positively, and Hagel aimed to leverage his energetic campaign, including a statewide summer tour, to close the recognition gap with Özdemir.

=== Andreas Stoch (SPD) ===
Andreas Stoch, the 55-year-old SPD state and parliamentary group leader, was elected as the SPD's lead candidate for the 2026 Baden-Württemberg state election with 94.6 per cent of the vote at the party's congress in Fellbach on July 5, 2025. A native of Heidenheim an der Brenz, a former culture minister (2013–2016), and SPD state chair since 2018, Stoch aimed to lead the SPD out of its low polling of around 10–12.5 per cent, significantly behind the CDU (26–31 per cent) and Greens (20–23 per cent), and reclaim a role in government, potentially in a coalition with the CDU and FDP. Despite the party's weak 11 per cent result in the 2021 election and a challenging opposition role, Stoch was determined to reverse the SPD’s fortunes, declaring, "Today, the comeback begins", and emphasised the party’s resolve to fight for every percentage point. His campaign drew inspiration from the team spirit of his hometown football club, 1. FC Heidenheim, advocating for a cohesive SPD that would stand up for workers and social justice. Stoch's policy platform prioritised economic security, social equity, and education reform. He made the fight for industrial jobs a cornerstone, criticising the relocation of jobs abroad (e.g. 200 jobs moved to Hungary by Bosch and ZF Friedrichshafen), and pledged to work with unions and businesses to maintain Baden-Württemberg’s industrial strength.

Stoch advocated for stronger tariff agreements and higher minimum wages to ensure workers earn significantly more than non-workers, dismissing debates over the Citizen's Income as misguided. Stoch also focused on addressing the state's housing crisis, citing a shortage of 200,000 affordable homes, and called for fee-free kindergartens to alleviate financial burdens on families and address the lack of 60,000 childcare places. Education was central point of his campaign, leveraging his experience as culture minister, where he earned praise despite recent criticism over 1,440 unfilled teaching posts due to a long-standing administrative error, which he said was not flagged during his tenure. Stoch emphasised a "resilient democracy" as the foundation for these policies, aiming to counter the AfD's appeal to workers by addressing economic fears through investment and opportunity. To strengthen the SPD's campaign, he promoted an open and participatory approach, incorporating ideas from a Debattencamp with diverse societal voices, including unions and cultural figures, to craft a voter-responsive platform focused on jobs, housing, and education. Despite his lower public recognition (24 per cent compared to Cem Özdemir’s 80 per cent), Stoch's experience and focus on core SPD themes aimed to position the party as a vital government partner.

=== Hans-Ulrich Rülke (FDP) ===
Hans-Ulrich Rülke, the 63-year-old FDP state and parliamentary group leader, was elected as the FDP's lead candidate for the 2026 Baden-Württemberg state election with 88.9 per cent of the vote at the party’s congress in Pforzheim on 5 July 2025. A Pforzheim resident, former gymnasial teacher, and seasoned politician, Rülke is a Landtag member since 2006, serving as FDP faction leader since 2009 and state chair since January 2025. Having led the FDP as top candidate in the 2016 and 2021 elections, he viewed the 2026 election as the "mother of all elections", critical for the FDP's survival, especially after its exit from the Bundestag. With the FDP polling at a precarious 5–9 per cent, close to the parliamentary threshold, Rülke aimed to secure a role in government, favouring a "bourgeois coalition" with the CDU, potentially including the SPD in a Germany coalition, while ruling out cooperation with the Greens.

Rülke's policy platform emphasised economic liberalisation, bureaucratic reform, and educational investment. He prioritised reducing bureaucracy, criticising the Green-led state government for having his view ignored recommendations to cut red tape and dissolving the Normenkontrollrat. His proposals included a "one in, two out" rule for regulations, banning excessive state-level rules beyond EU or federal law, introducing sunset clauses for laws, and digitalising administration to reduce reporting burdens. He advocated for tax cuts, arguing Germany's high-tax status hampers competitiveness, and supported targeted investments in defense and municipal infrastructure over blanket debt increases, criticising Federal Chancellor Merz’s softened stance on the debt brake. In education, Rülke, a former educator, called for a bildungswende with diverse school types, including strengthening the Realschule and preserving the Werkrealschule, to provide tailored opportunities for all students. He opposed the EU's combustion engine ban, labeling it an "attack on prosperity", and pushed for technology-neutral policies to support Baden-Württemberg's economy. Rülke also supported a controlled migration policy that would balance openness with clear rules. Despite the FDP's strong 10.5 per cent result in 2021, polls suggested a tight race, and Rülke’s campaign focused on restoring voter trust in liberal values, positioning the FDP as a voice for performance, competition, and individual freedom.

=== Markus Frohnmaier (AfD) ===
The AfD in Baden-Württemberg had two leading candidates, 34-year old Markus Frohnmaier and 75-year-old Emil Sänze, both of whom played significant roles in the party's strategy for the 2026 state election; however, Frohnmaier, a member of the Bundestag since 2017, was the designated lead candidate and explicitly ran only for Minister-President, not for a state parliament seat, making him the more prominent figure for the election. Sänze, who was elected twice via the constituency of Rottweil, was chosen as number 1 on the newly introduced state-wide party list.

Frohnmaier was elected on 31 May 2025 as the AfD's lead candidate for the 2026 Baden-Württemberg state election with near-unanimous support (386 of 387 delegates) at the party's congress in Heilbronn. Born in Romania and adopted by a Swabian couple, Frohnmaier grew up in Weil der Stadt, attended Hauptschule and Realschule, earned his Abitur, and began but did not complete a law degree, citing a heart attack at 27 as a reason for prioritising his political career. A Bundestag member since 2017, he was serving as deputy chair and foreign policy spokesperson for the AfD's federal faction and was seen a close ally of party leader Alice Weidel, having previously been her press spokesperson.

Frohnmaier’s campaign was ambitious, aiming to make the AfD the strongest force in Baden-Württemberg, capitalising on the party's polling surge to 19 per cent in May 2025, up from 9.7 per cent in 2021, placing it third behind the CDU (31 per cent) and Greens (20 per cent). He framed the election as a chance to oust the CDU and Greens, criticising CDU leader and Federal Chacellor Merz for he saw as broken promises on migration and the debt brake, and positioning the AfD as a "conservative, reliable" alternative. The AfD programme for the 2026 state election included a "9-point immediate program" for the first 100 days. According to Süddeutsche Zeitung, this programme included redirecting €400 million from climate measures to an energy rebate, building nuclear power plants, sourcing Russian gas, mandating state agencies to buy Baden-Württemberg-made vehicles, and exiting the federal asylum distribution system. Frohnmaier also proposed a referendum on irregular migration, advocating for border rejections, detention of deportable migrants, and in-kind benefits for asylum seekers. In education, he rejected the Gemeinschaftsschule, prioritised STEM subjects, and demanded schools display German flags. Controversially, he sought to revive economic ties with Russia via the Bundesrat and opposeed aid to Ukraine, arguing it is "not our war".

Frohnmaier's past as a "firebrand", including his 2015 speech calling for "cleaning out" politics and ties to the Junge Alternative (dissolved in March 2025) and Björn Höcke's "Flügel", drew scrutiny, with the Verfassungsschutz citing his rhetoric as evidence of the AfD's extremist tendencies. His posts, like one labeling "population exchange" critics as dismissive, and alleged Russian ties, including his marriage to a Russian journalist, fuelled criticism, although he denied being "Russia’s man" and advocated balanced relations. Despite his moderated tone, aiming for a "citizen-friendly" image, the Verfassungsschutz's "secured right-extremist" label for the federal AfD and "suspected case" status in Baden-Württemberg complicate his campaign. Notably, he did not seek a Landtag seat, only switching from the Bundestag if he were to become Minister-President. On the other hand, Thomas Strobl (CDU), Baden-Württemberg's Deputy Minister-President and State Minister of the Interior since 2016, was never elected to the Baden-Württemberg parliament either, and resigned from his Berlin seat only in June 2016, weeks after having taken office in Stuttgart. As a result, Frohnmaier's stance was framed as upholding separation of powers but criticised as a "back-up plan" to stay in Berlin.

== Opinion polling ==
=== Graphical summary ===
Local regression of polls conducted since the 2021 state election

=== Party polling ===
Polling firm	Fieldwork date	Sample size	Grüne	CDU	SPD	FDP	AfD	Linke	FW	BSW	Others	Lead
State election	8 Mar 2026	–	30.2	29.7	5.5	4.4	18.8	4.4	1.9	1.4	3.6	0.5
Forschungsgruppe Wahlen	4–5 Mar 2026	1,069	28	28	8	5.5	18	5.5	–	–	7	Tie
INSA	24 Feb – 3 Mar 2026	1,000	24	27	9	6	20	6	–	–	8	3
Forschungsgruppe Wahlen	23–26 Feb 2026	1,049	25	27	9	6	19	6	–	–	8	2
Infratest dimap	23–25 Feb 2026	1,530	27	28	7	6	18	5.5	–	–	8.5	1
INSA	17–23 Feb 2026	1,000	22	28	10	6	20	7	–	3	4	6
INSA	20–27 Jan 2026	1,000	21	29	10	5	20	7	–	3	5	8
Infratest dimap	14–20 Jan 2026	1,168	23	29	8	5	20	7	–	–	8	6
Infratest dimap	8–14 Oct 2025	1,158	20	29	10	5	21	7	–	3	5	8
INSA	7–14 Oct 2025	1,000	17	31	11	7	20	7	–	3	4	11
Infratest dimap	7–13 May 2025	1,146	20	31	10	5	19	7	–	4	4	11
Wahlkreisprognose	3–10 May 2025	1,100	23	26	12.5	4.5	23	5.5	–	1.5	4	3
INSA	29 Apr – 6 May 2025	1,000	17	31	12	6	19	8	–	4	3	11
2025 federal election	23 Feb 2025	–	13.6	31.6	14.2	5.6	19.8	6.8	1.4	4.1	2.9	11.8
INSA	3–10 Feb 2025	1,000	20	31	13	5	18	4	–	5	4	11
Infratest dimap	5–10 Dec 2024	1,156	22	33	13	4	15	–	–	4	9	11
INSA	25 Nov – 2 Dec 2024	1,000	20	34	11	6	17	–	–	6	3	14
Infratest dimap	1–8 Oct 2024	1,166	18	34	13	5	16	–	–	5	9	16
INSA	26 Sep – 4 Oct 2024	2,000	18	32	13	6	18	3	–	6	4	14
INSA	5–12 Aug 2024	1,000	19	31	11	7	16	3	–	8	5	11
INSA	4–11 Jun 2024	1,000	19	30	12	7	15	3	–	7	7	11
2024 EP election	9 Jun 2024	–	13.8	32.0	11.6	6.8	14.7	1.9	3.8	4.5	10.9	17.3
Infratest dimap	7–14 May 2024	1,148	22	32	11	7	14	–	3	4	7	10
INSA	4–11 Mar 2024	1,000	23	30	11	7	16	3	–	7	3	7
Infratest dimap	11–16 Jan 2024	1,152	22	32	9	7	18	–	3	–	9	10
Wahlkreisprognose	23–27 Oct 2023	1,100	20	30	10	7	22	1.5	3	–	6.5	10
Wahlkreisprognose	23–27 Oct 2023	1,100	20	27	9	8	20	2	–	6	8	7
Infratest dimap	21–25 Sep 2023	1,162	22	29	12	8	20	–	–	–	9	7
Wahlkreisprognose	17–24 Jul 2023	1,000	25.5	24	11	7	21	2	3	–	6.5	1.5
Infratest dimap	13–18 Jul 2023	1,185	24	26	13	7	19	–	–	–	11	2
INSA	20–27 Mar 2023	1,000	28	27	13	9	12	3	–	–	8	1
Infratest dimap	16–21 Mar 2023	1,178	26	27	15	10	12	–	–	–	10	1
Wahlkreisprognose	7–13 Mar 2023	1,005	28	32	10	6.5	13	2	3	–	5.5	4
Wahlkreisprognose	18–22 Dec 2022	1,000	28	23	15	9	15	2	2.5	–	5.5	5
INSA	24–31 Oct 2022	1,000	26	28	13	10	13	3	–	–	7	2
Infratest dimap	20–25 Oct 2022	1,175	27	26	15	9	13	3	–	–	7	1
Wahlkreisprognose	16–22 Oct 2022	1,014	27.5	22	15	8	16	3	4	–	4.5	5.5
Wahlkreisprognose	8–15 Aug 2022	1,300	30.5	24	13	10	12	2.5	3	–	5	6.5
INSA	4–11 Jul 2022	1,000	29	26	14	11	10	3	–	–	7	3
Wahlkreisprognose	3–10 Jun 2022	1,000	30.5	20.5	14	13	11	4	–	–	7	10
Wahlkreisprognose	5–6 May 2022	1,040	27.5	20.5	18	14	10	3	–	–	7	7
Infratest dimap	12–19 Apr 2022	1,170	28	26	15	11	9	3	–	–	8	2
INSA	28 Mar – 4 Apr 2022	1,000	25	23	19	11	10	3	–	–	9	2
Wahlkreisprognose	8–16 Mar 2022	1,600	27	25	16	14	9	2	–	–	7	2
Infratest dimap	4–8 Mar 2022	1,152	27	24	18	13	9	3	–	–	6	3
Infratest dimap	13–18 Jan 2022	1,166	26	23	16	12	11	4	–	–	8	3
Wahlkreisprognose	23–30 Dec 2021	1,002	26	19	20	19	8.5	3	–	–	4.5	6
Infratest dimap	7–12 Oct 2021	1,162	27	17	20	15	9	3	3	–	6	7
INSA	4–11 Oct 2021	1,000	24	20	21	16	9	3	–	–	7	3
2021 federal election	26 Sep 2021	–	17.2	24.8	21.6	15.3	9.6	3.3	1.7	–	6.5	3.2
Wahlkreisprognose	20–28 Jul 2021	–	31	22	12	17	7.5	3	–	–	7.5	9
2021 state election	14 Mar 2021	–	32.6	24.1	11.0	10.5	9.7	3.6	3.0	–	5.5	8.5

=== Minister-President polling ===
Polling firm	Fieldwork date	Sample size					None	Unsure/ Unknown	Lead
Polling firm	Fieldwork date	Sample size	Özdemir Grüne	Hagel CDU	Frohnmaier AfD	Stoch SPD	None	Unsure/ Unknown	Lead
Infratest dimap	8 Mar 2026	–	45	32	–	–	23		13
Forschungsgruppe Wahlen	8 Mar 2026	–	46	33	–	–	21		13
Forschungsgruppe Wahlen	4–5 Mar 2026	1.069	47	24	8	–	7	14	23
Forschungsgruppe Wahlen	23–26 Feb 2026	1.049	47	25	8	–	4	16	22
Infratest dimap	23–25 Feb 2026	1,530	42	21	11	–	26		21
Infratest dimap	14–20 Jan 2026	1,168	39	19	9	–	33		20
Infratest dimap	8–14 Oct 2025	1,158	41	17	8	–	34		24
Infratest dimap	7–13 May 2025	1,146	39	18	7	–	36		21
Wahlkreisprognose	3–10 May 2025	1,100	23	21	11	8	37		2

=== Constituency pluralities ===
Polling firm	Release date	Grüne	CDU	SPD	FDP	AfD
2026 state election	8 Mar 2026	13	56	0	0	1
election.de	6 Mar 2026	16	53	0	0	1
election.de	27 Feb 2026	11	58	0	0	1
election.de	20 Feb 2026	9	59	0	0	2
election.de	13 Feb 2026	9	59	0	0	2
election.de	6 Feb 2026	9	59	0	0	2
Wahlkreisprognose	12 May 2025	18	41	0	0	11
Wahlkreisprognose	27 Oct 2023	12	52	0	0	6
Wahlkreisprognose	24 Jul 2023	26	30	0	0	14
Wahlkreisprognose	13 Mar 2023	17	53	0	0	0
Wahlkreisprognose	22 Dec 2022	39	27	3	0	1
Wahlkreisprognose	23 Oct 2022	43	23	2	0	2
Wahlkreisprognose	16 Aug 2022	40	28	2	0	0
Wahlkreisprognose	10 Jun 2022	59	9	2	0	0
Wahlkreisprognose	7 May 2022	54	13	2	1	0
Wahlkreisprognose	17 Mar 2022	38	29	2	1	0
Wahlkreisprognose	30 Dec 2021	44	8	9	9	0
Wahlkreisprognose	28 Jul 2021	54	10	1	5	0
2021 state election	14 Mar 2021	58	12	0	0	0

== Results ==
Party	Party list			Constituency			Total seats	+/–
Party	Votes	%	Seats	Votes	%	Seats	Total seats	+/–
Alliance 90/The Greens	1,623,156	30.20	43	1,368,072	25.53	13	56	–2
Christian Democratic Union	1,595,844	29.69	0	1,837,543	34.29	56	56	+14
Alternative for Germany	1,010,449	18.80	34	1,009,819	18.84	1	35	+18
Social Democratic Party	298,278	5.55	10	450,169	8.40	0	10	–9
The Left	237,062	4.41	0	265,186	4.95	0	0	0
Free Democratic Party	235,599	4.38	0	256,168	4.78	0	0	–18
Free Voters	102,687	1.91	0	54,549	1.02	0	0	0
Sahra Wagenknecht Alliance	76,314	1.42	0	31,288	0.58	0	0	0
Tierschutzpartei	49,802	0.93	0	2,131	0.04	0	0	0
Volt	45,797	0.85	0	52,185	0.97	0	0	0
Die PARTEI	22,784	0.42	0	8,528	0.16	0	0	0
Grassroots Democratic Party of Germany	15,122	0.28	0	3,087	0.06	0	0	0
Alliance C – Christians for Germany	12,518	0.23	0	4,069	0.08	0	0	0
Values Union	11,304	0.21	0	4,651	0.09	0	0	0
Ecological Democratic Party	9,370	0.17	0	5,701	0.11	0	0	0
Pensioners' Party	9,009	0.17	0				0	0
The Justice Party	7,332	0.14	0	642	0.01	0	0	0
Party of Progress	3,670	0.07	0				0	0
Party for Rejuvenation Research	3,590	0.07	0				0	0
Klimaliste	2,790	0.05	0				0	0
Party of Humanists	2,357	0.04	0				0	0
Independents				5,088	0.09	0	0	0
Total	5,374,834	100.00	87	5,358,876	100.00	70	157	+3
Valid votes	5,374,834	99.41		5,358,876	99.11			
Invalid/blank votes	32,018	0.59		47,976	0.89			
Total votes	5,406,852	100.00		5,406,852	100.00			
Registered voters/turnout	7,773,341	69.56		7,773,341	69.56			
Source: wahlrecht.de

=== Electorate ===
The electorate statistics, based on exit-poll surveys, are as follows:

Demographic	Grüne	CDU	SPD	FDP	AfD	Linke	Other
Total vote	30.2%	29.7%	5.5%	4.4%	18.8%	4.4%	6.9%
Sex
Men	27%	31%	5%	5%	22%	4%	6%
Women	34%	28%	6%	4%	15%	5%	8%
Age
16–24 years old	28%	16%	6%	6%	16%	14%	14%
25–34 years old	27%	17%	4%	5%	23%	9%	15%
35–44 years old	29%	24%	4%	4%	24%	5%	10%
45–59 years old	30%	30%	5%	4%	22%	3%	6%
60–69 years old	34%	32%	5%	4%	19%	2%	4%
70 and older	31%	44%	8%	5%	9%	2%	1%
Employment status
Self-employed	22%	35%	2%	13%	19%	2%	7%
Employees	31%	28%	4%	4%	20%	4%	9%
Workers	18%	21%	5%	5%	37%	4%	10%
Pensioners	35%	37%	8%	3%	12%	3%	2%
Education
Simple education	18%	37%	8%	4%	25%	3%	5%
Medium education	23%	30%	6%	4%	25%	4%	8%
High education	39%	26%	4%	5%	12%	6%	8%
Financial situation
Good	33%	31%	6%	5%	15%	4%	6%
Bad	16%	19%	5%	3%	41%	7%	9%

== Aftermath ==
Similar to the 2024 Brandenburg state election, the election became a two-horse race at the expense of most other parties, which finished below their poll ratings. A few days before the election, the Greens recovered from their low poll ratings and nearly repeated their 2021 result, with Cem Özdemir succeeding Kretschmann and becoming the second Green Minister-President in the history of Germany. The CDU and the AfD both made significant gains that did not translate into more power, even though in theory a CDU-AfD coalition could govern the state and by extension Germany; this is "forbidden" by the anti-AfD firewall policy, which was reconfirmed by CDU leader Hagel. The CDU, seemingly winning the same number of seats with about 0.5%-point less of the popular vote, will support the Greens in a third term. Therefore, Cem Özdemir would go on to become the state’s minister-president, becoming the first state premier of Turkish descent in Germany.

The AfD nearly doubled their vote from 9.7% in 2021 to 18.8%, and nearly doubled their number of seats in the Landtag. However, they did not catch up to the two leading parties; but, with 18.8%, the AfD of Baden-Württemberg bypassed Hesse as the AfD's best in western Germany and once again became leader of the opposition, nearly as the only opposition party. The SPD, formerly a Volkspartei with over 40% and having ruled Germany with Chancellor Olaf Scholz until about a year ago, is part of Chancellor Merz's coalition and has dropped to an all-time all-state low of 5.5%, with their state leader Stoch conceding and resigning. The FDP, having dropped out of most state parliaments as well as the Bundestag, and polling too low in four upcoming elections, suffered another disappointing result: failing to reach the five per cent hurdle even in its supportive region, thus no longer being represented in its Landtag. Despite a surge since the 2025 federal election and in part due to strategic voting, The Left, which was never represented in the state, also failed to pass 5%; however, it reached at an all-time high, ahead of the FDP. Other parties remained insignificant.

== See also ==
- 2026 Bavarian local elections
- 2026 Rhineland-Palatinate state election
