= Danyal Bayaz =

German politician

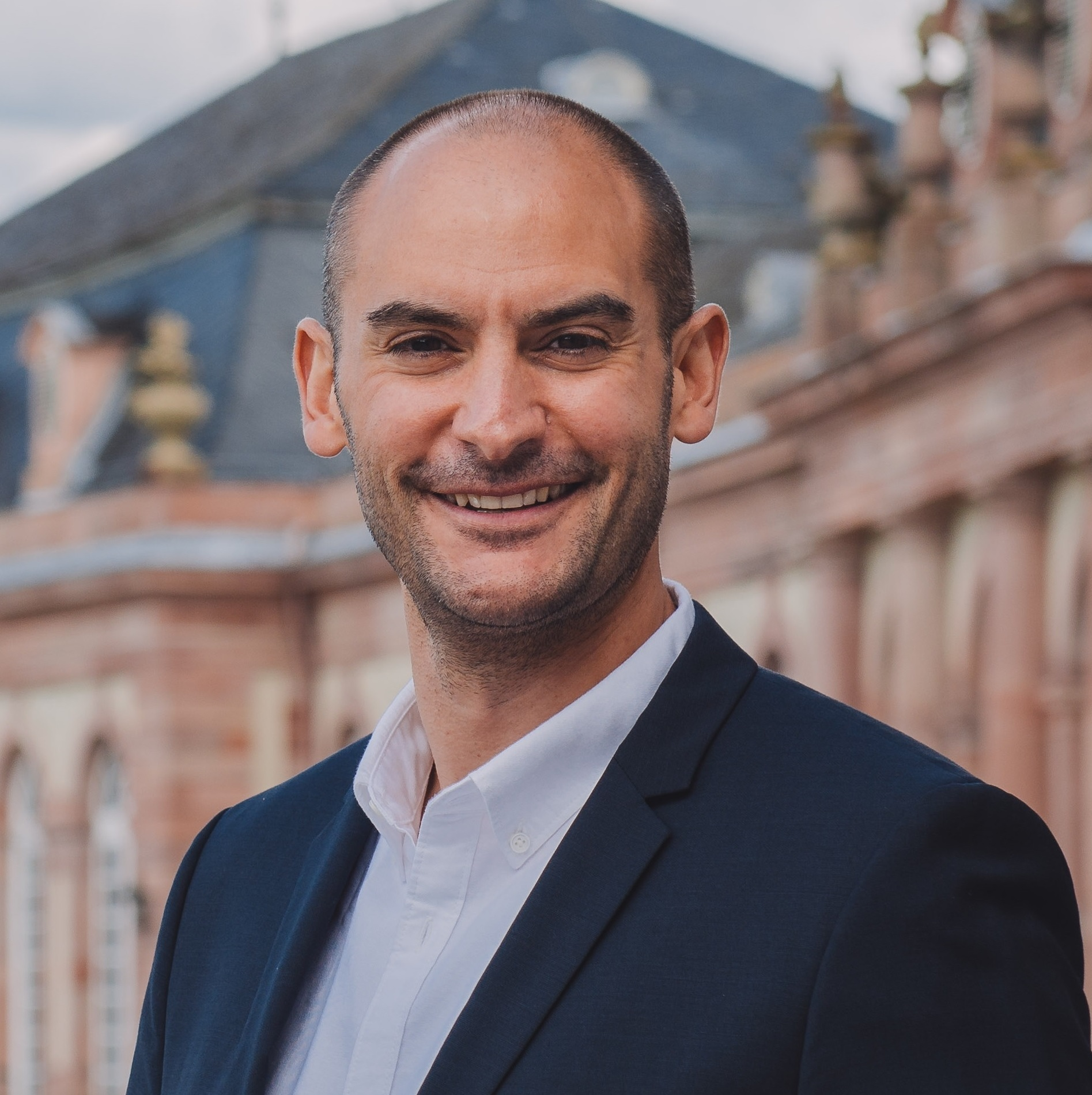
- Bayaz in 2018

Minister of Finance of Baden-Württemberg
- Incumbent
- Assumed office 12 May 2021
- Minister-President: Winfried Kretschmann; Cem Özdemir
- Preceded by: Edith Sitzmann

Member of the Bundestag
- In office 2017–2021

Personal details
- Born: 15 October 1983 (age 43) Heidelberg, West Germany (now Germany)
- Party: Greens
- Education: University of Hohenheim; Cornell University

Danyal Bayaz (born 15 October 1983) is a German politician of Alliance 90/The Greens who has been serving as State Minister of Finance in the government of Minister-President of Baden-Württemberg Winfried Kretschmann since May 2021-2026 and since 2026 in Özdemir cabinet. From 2017 until 2021, he was a member of the Bundestag.

== Early life and career ==
Bayaz was born in Heidelberg in 1983 to a German mother and a Turkish-born father. His father worked as a journalist. After graduating from Heidelberg's Bunsen Gymnasium, he studied politics and economics at the University of Hohenheim, where he later earned a doctorate in financial markets. Among other things, he completed a research stay as a Fulbright Fellow at Cornell University in New York.

From 2013 to 2017 Bayaz worked as a consultant for the global strategy consultancy Boston Consulting Group (BCG), based at the firm's Stuttgart office.

== Political career ==
=== Early beginnings ===
Bayaz joined the Green Party in 2005. From 2013 until 2017, he was part of the party's leadership in Baden-Württemberg under co-chairs Thekla Walker and Oliver Hildenbrand.

=== Member of the German Parliament, 2017–2021 ===
Bayaz became a member of the Bundestag in the 2017 German federal election. From 2017 until 2021, he was a member of the Finance Committee and an alternate member of the Budget Committee, where he served as his parliamentary group's rapporteur on the annual budgets of the Federal Ministry of Justice and Consumer Protection and the Federal Constitutional Court. On the Finance Committee, he led his group's work on the Wirecard scandal.

In addition to his committee assignments, Bayaz was a member of the German delegation to the Franco-German Parliamentary Assembly since 2019. Also from 2019, chaired the Business Advisory Board of the Green Party's parliamentary group. From 2019, he joined forces with Lukas Köhler on bringing together fellow parliamentarians from the Green Party and the Free Democratic Party (FDP) to explore options for a so-called Jamaica coalition government.

=== Career in state politics ===
In the negotiations to form a coalition government under the leadership of Minister-President of Baden-Württemberg Winfried Kretschmann following the 2021 state elections, Bayaz was a member of the working group on economic affairs, labor and innovation.

In the negotiations to form a so-called traffic light coalition of the Social Democratic Party (SPD), the Green Party and the Free Democratic Party (FDP) following the 2021 national elections, Bayaz was part of his party's delegation in the working group on financial regulation and the national budget, co-chaired by Doris Ahnen, Lisa Paus and Christian Dürr.

== Other activities ==
=== Corporate boards ===
- Baden-Württembergische Bank (BW-Bank), Ex-Officio Member of the Board of Supervisory Directors (since 2021)
- EnBW, Ex-Officio Member of the Board of Supervisory Directors (since 2021)
- KfW, Ex-Officio Member of the Board of Supervisory Directors (since 2021)
- Landesbank Baden-Württemberg (LBBW), Ex-Officio Member of the Board of Supervisory Directors (since 2021)

=== Non-profit organizations ===
- Baden-Württemberg Stiftung, Ex-Officio Member of the Supervisory Board (since 2021)
- German Economic Association, Member

== Personal life ==
Bayaz has been in a relationship with fellow Green Party politician Katharina Schulze since 2019. In 2021, the couple's son was born.
