= Manuel Hagel =

German politician

Manuel Hagel MdL MdBR
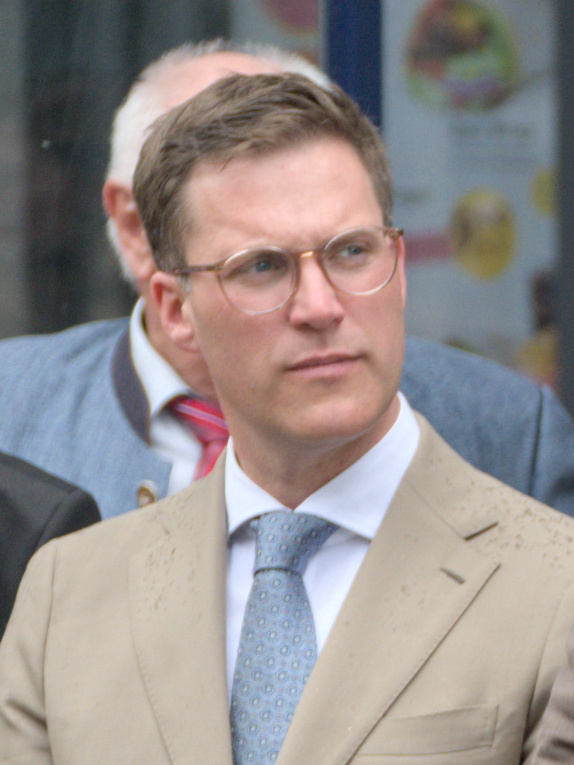
- Hagel in 2025

Deputy Minister-President of Baden-Württemberg
- Incumbent
- Assumed office 13 May 2026
- Minister-President: Cem Özdemir
- Preceded by: Thomas Strobl

Minister for Interior, Digitalisation and Europe of Baden-Württemberg
- Incumbent
- Assumed office 13 May 2026
- Minister-President: Cem Özdemir
- Preceded by: Thomas Strobl

Leader of the Christian Democratic Union in Baden-Württemberg
- Incumbent
- Assumed office 18 November 2023
- Deputy: Thorsten Frei; Ronja Kemmer; Nicole Razavi; Nicolas Zippelius
- Preceded by: Thomas Strobl

Leader of the CDU in the Landtag of Baden-Württemberg
- In office 4 May 2021 – 12 May 2026
- Preceded by: Wolfgang Reinhart
- Succeeded by: Tobias Vogt

Member of the Landtag of Baden-Württemberg for Ehingen
- Incumbent
- Assumed office 11 May 2016
- Preceded by: Karl Traub

Personal details
- Born: 1 May 1988 (age 38) Ehingen, West Germany
- Party: CDU
- Spouse: Franziska Hagel
- Children: 3
- Occupation: Bank officer

Manuel Hagel (born 1 May 1988) is a German politician and former bank officer who has served as Deputy Minister-President of Baden-Württemberg and Interior Minister of the state since 2026. He is also the leader of the Christian Democratic Union in Baden-Württemberg (CDU) since 2023, having been its secretary general from 2016 to 2021. He has been a Member of the Landtag of Baden-Württemberg (MdL) for Ehingen since 2016, where he has chaired his party's parliamentary group since 2021.

In May 2025, he was selected as CDU's lead candidate for the Baden-Württemberg state election. After his party narrowly lost the election on 8 March 2026, finishing second behind the Greens, Hagel served as the CDU’s chief negotiator in coalition talks with the Greens under Cem Özdemir. A coalition agreement was reached in May 2026, and the Özdemir cabinet was sworn in on 13 May 2026. Hagel was appointed Minister of the Interior of Baden-Württemberg, with responsibility for internal security, and also became Deputy Minister-President.

== Early life and career ==
Hagel was born in 1988 in the Swabian town of Ehingen and became a banker. He is Catholic and has served as the altar boy, after his grandfather was a sacristan.

== Political career ==
Hagel entered the CDU in 2006 and was elected as part of his party's leadership in Baden-Württemberg in 2015. He became a member of the Landtag of Baden-Württemberg in the 2016 state elections. In parliament, he has since been serving on the Committee on Internal Affairs, Digitization and Migration and on the Committee on Consumer Protection.

On the basis of a proposal made by Thomas Strobl, Hagel was elected as secretary general of the CDU in Baden-Württemberg in 2016.

Hagel was nominated by his party as delegate to the Federal Convention for the purpose of electing the President of Germany in 2022.

In the negotiations to form a Grand Coalition under the leadership of Friedrich Merz's Christian Democrats (CDU together with the Bavarian CSU) and the Social Democrats (SPD) following the 2025 German elections, Hagel led the CDU delegation in the working group on digital policy; his counterparts from the other parties were Reinhard Brandl and Armand Zorn.

== Political positions ==
In 2017, Hagel called for abolishment of dual citizenship in Germany. Being part of the conservative right wing of the CDU, he supported a “conservative manifesto” in 2018, criticizing the politics of then-chairwoman of CDU and German chancellor Angela Merkel and demanding a return of the party to conservative values. In the same year, Hagel appeared as main speaker at the meeting of WerteUnion which was a CDU-related right-wing association at the time.

In 2020, Hagel expressed support for Jens Spahn as next chairman of the CDU. Ahead of the 2021 Christian Democratic Union of Germany leadership election, he endorsed Friedrich Merz to succeed Annegret Kramp-Karrenbauer as the party's chair.
