= Moritz Oppelt =

German politician

Minister of Justice and Migration for Baden-Württemberg
- Incumbent
- Assumed office 13 May 2026
- Minister-President: Cem Özdemir
- Preceded by: Marion Gentges

Member of the Bundestag; for Rhein-Neckar
- In office 26 October 2021 – 25 March 2025
- Preceded by: Nina Warken
- Succeeded by: Vacant

Personal details
- Born: 4 February 1989 (age 37) Heidelberg, West Germany
- Party: Christian Democratic Union
- Children: 2
- Education: University of Mannheim

Moritz Oppelt (born 4 February 1989 in Heidelberg) is a German politician of the Christian Democratic Union (CDU) who has been serving as State Minister for Justice and Migration in the government of Minister-President Cem Özdemir of Baden-Württemberg since 2025. From 2021 to 2025, he was a member of the Bundestag, the federal diet.

== Early life and career ==
Oppelt was born 1989 in the West German city of Heidelberg and studied law and economics at the University of Mannheim.

From October 2017 to March 2018, he worked as a legal assistant for notaries in Wiesloch. Since March 2018, he has been a lawyer in the tax administration of the state of Baden-Württemberg. Most recently, he was head of a department in the tax investigation unit.

== Political career ==
Oppelt entered the CDU in 2007 and was elected directly to the Bundestag in 2021.

== Memberships ==
Oppelt is a member of the non-partisan Europa-Union Deutschland, which advocates for a federal Europe and the European integration process.

== Private ==
Oppelt lives in Neckargemünd, is married and the father of two children.
