= Nicole Razavi =

German politician (born 1965)

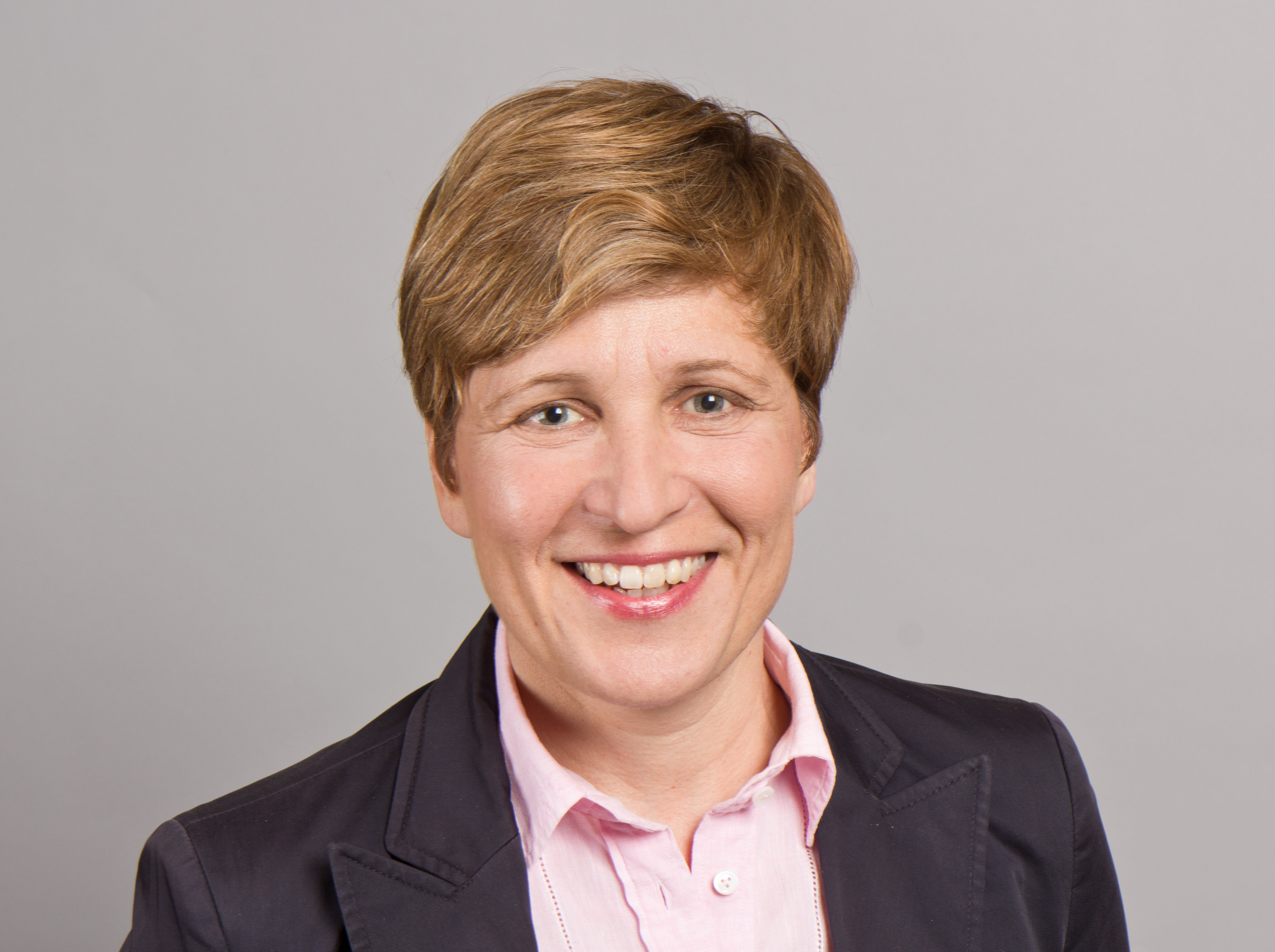
- Razavi in 2013

Minister for Transport of Baden-Württemberg
- Incumbent
- Assumed office 13 May 2026
- Minister-President: Cem Özdemir
- Preceded by: Winfried Hermann

Minister of Regional Development and Housing of Baden-Württemberg
- In office 12 May 2021 – 12 May 2026
- Minister-President: Winfried Kretschmann
- Preceded by: Position established
- Succeeded by: Theresa Schopper

Personal details
- Born: 20 May 1965 (age 60) Hong Kong, British Hong Kong
- Party: Christian Democratic Union

Nicole Razavi (born 20 May 1965 in Hong Kong) is a German politician (CDU) in the state of Baden-Württemberg. She served as Minister of Regional Development and Housing of Baden-Württemberg from 2021 to 2026 and as Minister for Transport of Baden-Württemberg since 2026. She has been a member of the Landtag of Baden-Württemberg since 2006.
