= Susanne Eisenmann =

German politician

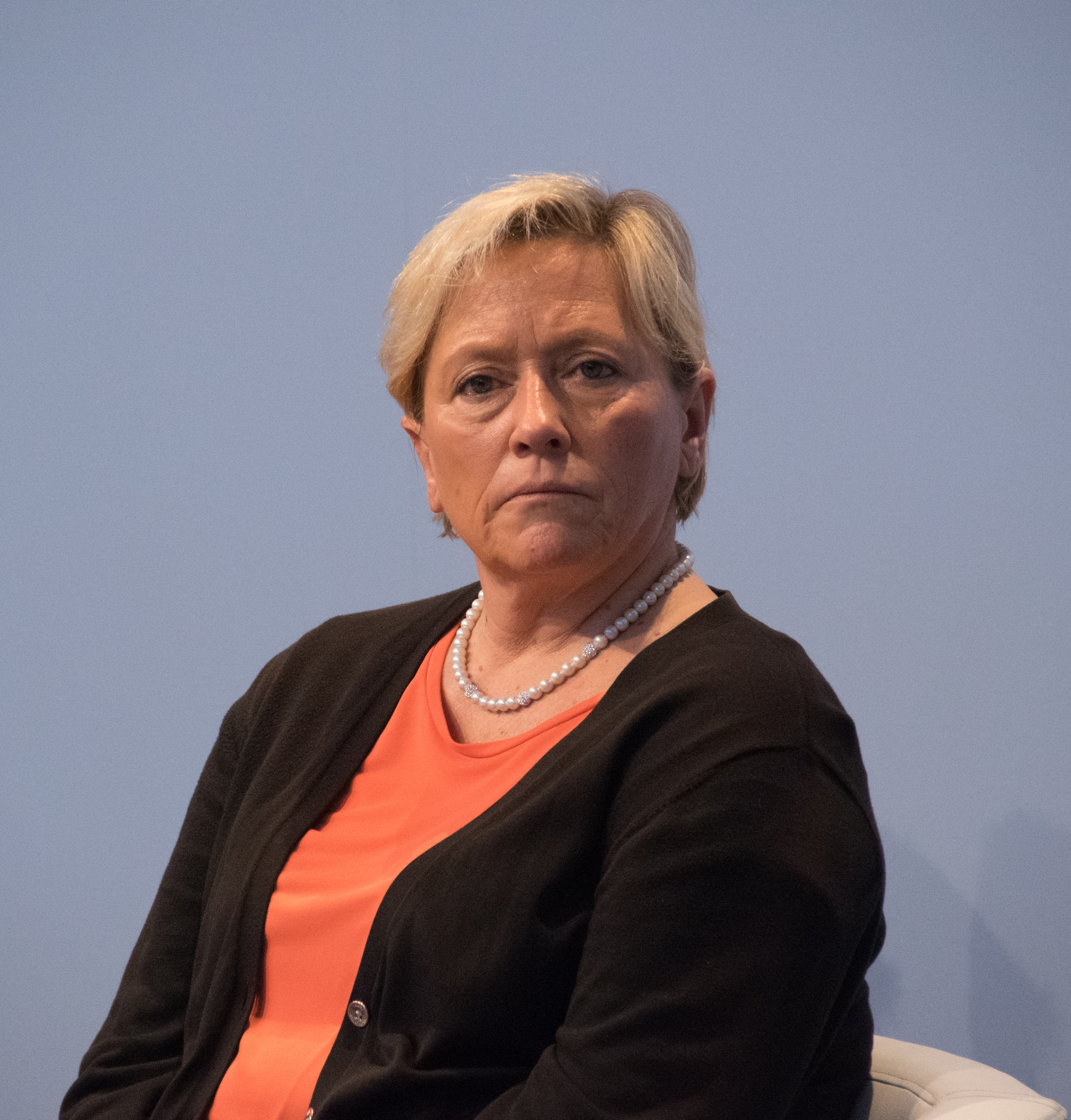
- Eisenmann in 2017

Minister for Culture, Youth and Sports of Baden-Württemberg
- In office 12 May 2016 – 12 May 2021
- Prime Minister: Winfried Kretschmann
- Preceded by: Andreas Stoch
- Succeeded by: Theresa Schopper

Personal details
- Born: November 28, 1964 (age 61) Stuttgart, Baden-Württemberg, West Germany
- Party: CDU
- Spouse: Christoph Dahl
- Children: 5

Susanne Eisenmann (born 28 November 1964) is a German politician of the Christian Democratic Union (CDU) who served as State Minister for Culture, Youth and Sports in the government of Minister-President Winfried Kretschmann of Baden-Württemberg between 2016 and 2021.

Previously, Eisenmann was a member of the Stuttgart city council from 1994, and manager of the office of Günther Oettinger from 1991 to 2005. In 2019, she was chosen as the CDU's top candidate for the 2021 Baden-Württemberg state election.

== Personal life ==
Eisenmann was born in Bad Cannstatt in Stuttgart in 1964. She is married to Christoph Dahl, manager of the Baden-Württemberg Foundation; they have five children.

== Political career ==
At age 16, Eisenmann joined the Young Union (JU). From 1991 to 2005 she served as chief of staff to Günther Oettinger, then leader of the CDU's parliamentary group in the Landtag of Baden-Württemberg. In 1994, aged 29, she was elected to the Stuttgart city council. There, she was deputy leader of the CDU group from 1999, and leader from 2004 to 2005. She then became councillor for Culture, Education and Sport, a position in which she served until 2016.

After the 2016 Baden-Württemberg state election, the CDU joined a coalition with The Greens. Eisenmann was appointed State Minister for Culture, Youth and Sports in Cabinet Kretschmann II.

On 29 May 2019, Eisenmann was selected as the CDU's lead candidate for the 2021 Baden-Württemberg state election. The CDU went on to achieve its worst result in Baden-Württemberg's history. Subsequently, Eisenmann, who failed to win a seat in the state legislature, announced her departure from politics.

== Political positions ==
Ahead of the Christian Democrats’ leadership election, Eisenmann publicly endorsed in 2020 Friedrich Merz to succeed Annegret Kramp-Karrenbauer as the party's chair.
