= Sarah Schweizer =

German politician (born 1983)

Member of the Landtag of Baden-Württemberg
- Incumbent
- Assumed office 11 May 2021
- Constituency: Göppingen

Personal details
- Born: 17 October 1983 (age 42)
- Party: Christian Democratic Union

Sarah Schweizer (born 17 October 1983) is a German politician serving as a member of the Landtag of Baden-Württemberg since 2021. She has served as chairwoman of the Christian Democratic Union in Göppingen since 2022.
