= Markus Frohnmaier =

German politician

Member of the Bundestag
- Incumbent
- Assumed office 24 October 2017

Personal details
- Born: 25 February 1991 (age 35) Craiova, Romania
- Party: Alternative for Germany

Markus-Cornel Frohnmaier (born 25 February 1991) is a Romanian-born German politician from Alternative for Germany. He was elected Member of the Bundestag for Baden-Württemberg in the 2017 German federal election. After the German federal election in February 2025, he became one of five deputy chairmen of the party in the Bundestag (AfD-Fraktion im Deutschen Bundestag) and sits on the Foreign Affairs Committee. Up until February 2018, Frohnmaier was the chair of Young Alternative for Germany, then AfD's youth wing.

== Foreign affairs ==
As a member of the 21st Bundestag, Frohnmaier sits on the Foreign Affairs Committee (Auswärtiger Ausschuss).

In October 2025, Frohnmaier said that Kosovo as a "project" that has failed, calling for the end of European financial aid and halting KFOR operations.

In July 2025, Frohnmaier and his AfD colleague Jan Wenzel Schmidt met with Under Secretary of State for Public Diplomacy and Public Affairs Sarah Rogers and her predecessor Darren Beattie in the U.S. State Department.

== Links with Russia ==
In an OCCRP investigation, Frohnmaier was listed as a recipient of financial benefits of Russia's International Agency for Current Policy.

German journalist Manuel Ochsenreiter introduced Frohnmaier to a Russian government network in 2015, seeing potential in him. By 2016, Frohnmaier was referred to as "our candidate" by Kremlin-linked figures, and he was invited to a public Russian economic forum in Crimea, which Russia had occupied in March 2014. A 2019 investigation revealed that Russian state officials considered backing Frohnmaier in the 2017 Bundestag election, with documents suggesting he would push pro-Russian, anti-American policies. The document notes that if he is elected, Russia would have "our own, completely controlled deputy in the Bundestag". One document, written by Ochsenreiter, proposed a campaign strategy centred on "German sovereignty" and "good relations with Russia." Both material and media support was recommended to help him get elected. Frohnmaier, when asked about the documents by Tagesschau, denied knowing about the documents or who authored them, insisting they did not prove any complicity by him. There was no evidence that the proposed support was put into practice. Frohnmaier later hired Ochsenreiter as a parliamentary assistant in 2018.

Following a false flag arson attack in Ukraine, in January 2019 he dismissed Manuel Ochsenreiter as his employee after accusations that Ochsenreiter was the financier of the arsonists.

== Personal life ==
Frohnmaier was born in 1991 in Craiova, Romania, where his Romanian biological parents gave him the name Cornel. According to his own information, he has never met his biological parents.

A German couple adopted him and his twin sister out of an orphanage. He then grew up with his adoptive parents in Weil der Stadt. From 2011, Frohnmaier studied law at the University of Tübingen and at the University of Hagen, but dropped out without a degree to focus on his political work.

Frohnmaier is married to Russian journalist Daria Frohnmaier, and has two children with her.

== See also ==
- List of members of the 19th Bundestag
- List of members of the 20th Bundestag
- List of members of the 21st Bundestag
