= Hans-Ulrich Rülke =

German politician

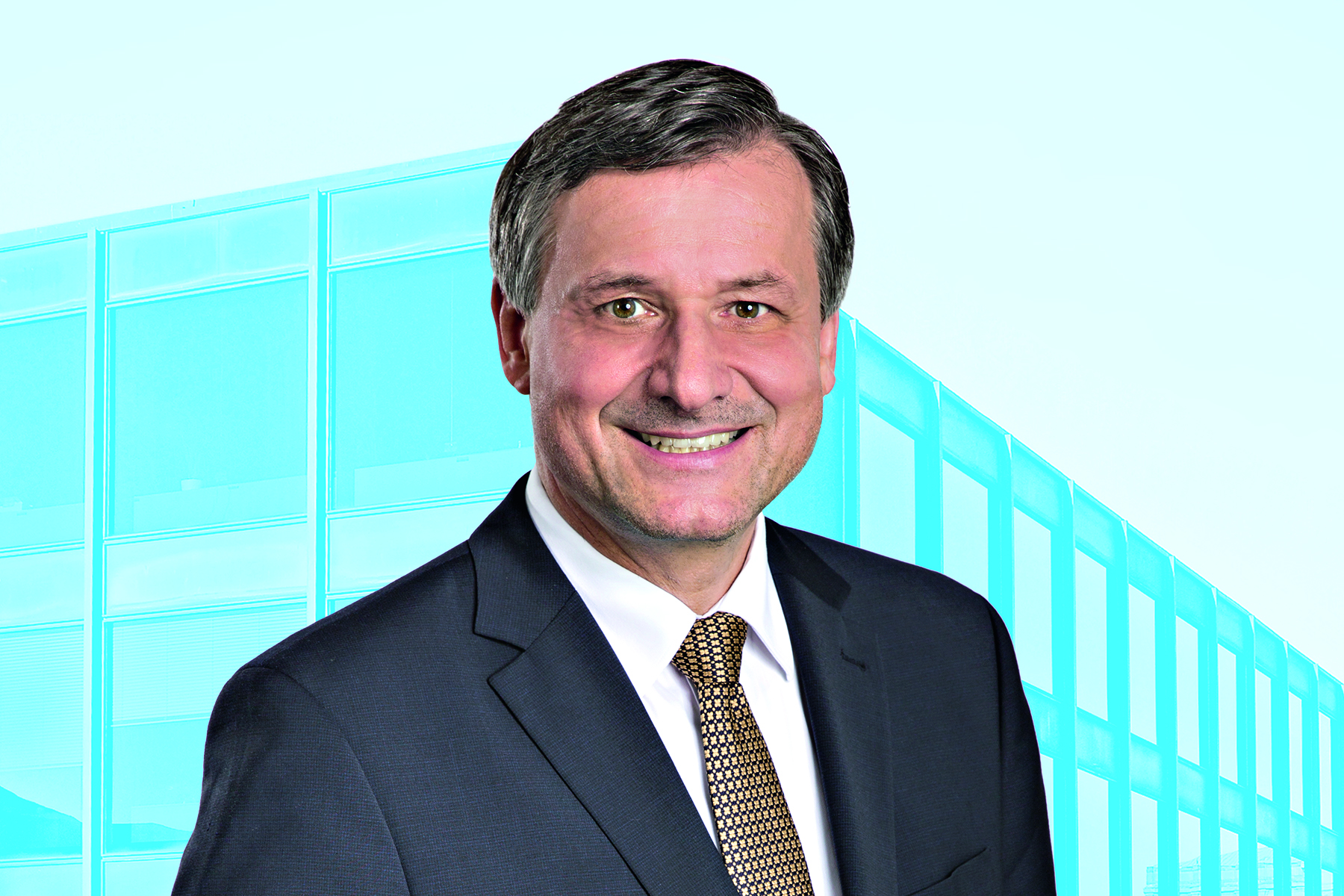
- Rülke in 2016

Leader of the Free Democratic Party in the Landtag of Baden-Württemberg
- In office 16 June 2009 – 8 March 2026
- Deputy: Timm Kern
- Preceded by: Ulrich Noll

Member of the Landtag of Baden-Württemberg
- In office 13 March 2016 – 8 March 2026
- Constituency: Pforzheim (second mandate)
- In office 26 March 2006 – 13 March 2016
- Constituency: Enzkreis (second mandate)

Personal details
- Born: 3 October 1961 (age 64) Tuttlingen, Baden-Württemberg, West Germany
- Party: FDP
- Children: 3

Hans-Ulrich Rülke is a German teacher and politician of the Free Democratic Party (FDP) who has been a member of the Landtag of Baden-Württemberg from 2006 to 2016 and again from 2016 to 2026. He has chaired his party's parliamentary group from 2009 to 2026. He was the FDP's lead candidate for the state elections in 2016 and in 2021.

== Early life and career ==
Rülke was born on 3 October 1961 in Tuttlingen. He attended primary and secondary school in Singen before studying German language and literature, politics, history, and sociology in Konstanz. In 1993 he taught at Hilda-Gymnasium in Pforzheim, and from 2001 to 2005 he was specialist advisor for politics and economy at the high school office in Karlsruhe.

== Political career ==
Rülke became a member of the Free Democratic Party in 1985. In 1999 he became chairman of the Pforzheim FDP association. The same year, he was elected to the city council of Pforzheim, and has retained his seat ever since. He served as leader of the FDP group in the council from 2001 to 2011. In 2014, he became leader of the joint FDP/Free Voter group. After the 2019 local elections, the FDP formed a group with the Free Voters, Independent Citizens, and Parents List, of which Hans-Ulrich became leader. In July 2019 the council elected him deputy mayor of Pforzheim.

Rülke was elected to the Landtag of Baden-Württemberg in the 2006 state election as a member of the Free Democratic Party. After the retirement of Ulrich Noll in June 2009, he was elected the leader of the FDP parliamentary group. He became co-deputy leader of the state party association in 2013, and a member of the federal FDP executive in 2019.

Rülke was the FDP's lead candidate for the 2016 Baden-Württemberg state election. The party achieved a 3.0-point swing, a marked improvement from its poor performance of 5.3% in 2011. The party's parliamentary group expanded from 7 to 12 members. Following the 2021 state elections, he led his party's delegation in the negotiations with Minister-President Winfried Kretschmann's Alliance '90/Greens on a potential coalition government.

In the negotiations to form a so-called traffic light coalition of the Social Democratic Party (SPD), the Green Party and the FDP following the 2021 federal elections, Rülke was part of his party's delegation in the working group on migration and integration, co-chaired by Boris Pistorius, Luise Amtsberg and Joachim Stamp.

After the FDP failed to re-enter the Baden-Württemberg state parliament for the first time in the 2026 state election, receiving only 4.5 percent of the vote, Rülke announced his resignation as state chairman of the FDP Baden-Württemberg. He explained that he wanted to take political responsibility for the election result.

== Personal life ==
Rülke is married and has three children.
