= Winfried Hermann =

German politician

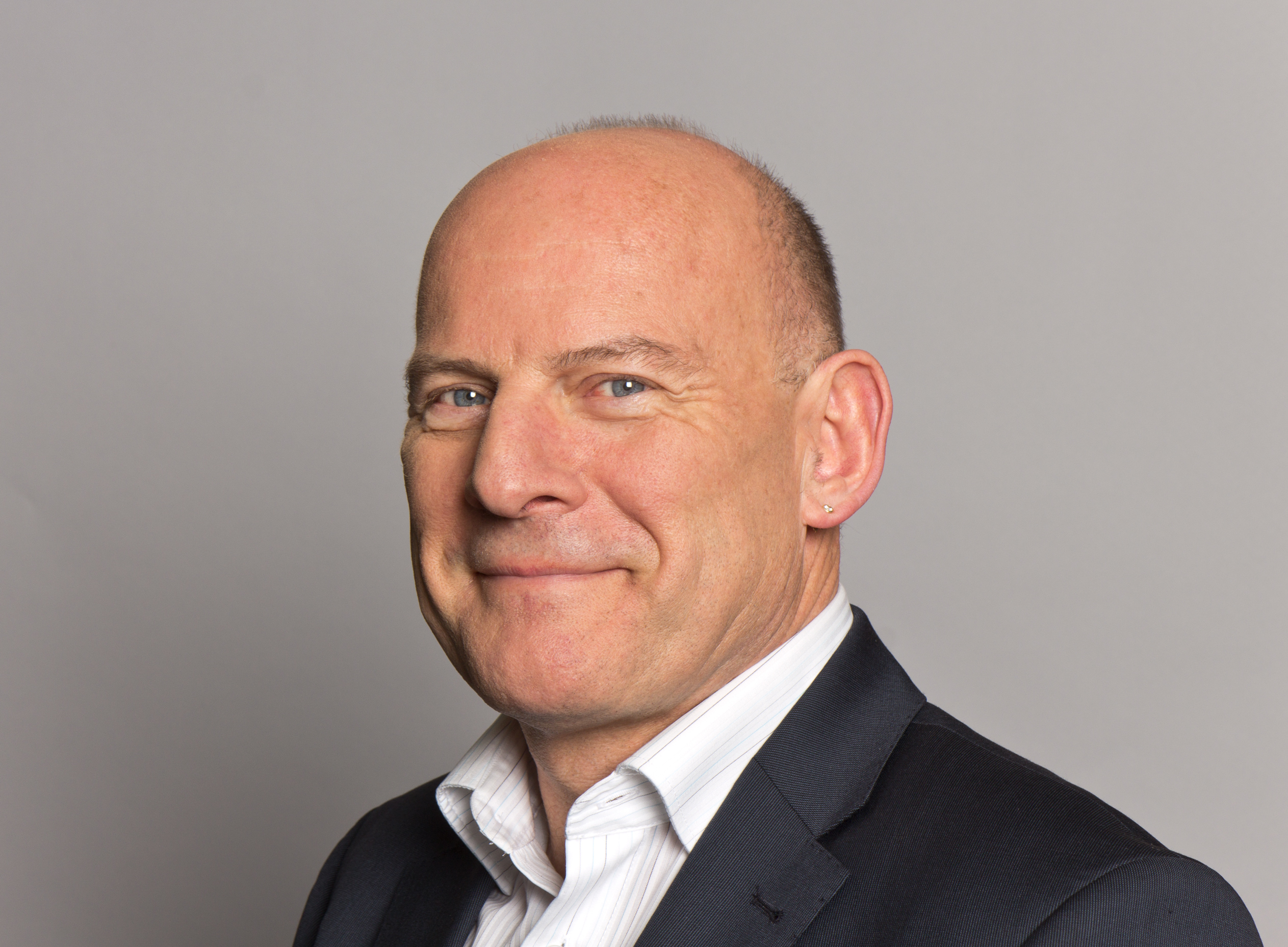

Minister for Transport of Baden-Württemberg
- In office 12 May 2011 – 12 May 2026
- Prime Minister: Winfried Kretschmann
- Preceded by: Tanja Gönner
- Succeeded by: Nicole Razavi

Member of the Bundestag
- In office 1998–2011

Personal details
- Born: 19 July 1952 (age 74) Rottenburg am Neckar, West Germany
- Party: Alliance '90/The Greens
- Education: University of Tübingen
- Occupation: Teacher

Winfried Hermann (born 19 July 1952) is a German politician of Alliance '90/The Greens who served as State Minister for Transport of Baden-Württemberg in the Cabinets Kretschmann I, II and III from 2011 to 2026.

From 1992 to 1997, Hermann was chairman of the Baden-Württemberg Greens. From 1998 to 2011 he was an MP of the Bundestag, Germany's national parliament.

== Early life and career ==
After obtaining his high school diploma, Hermann studied German, Political Science and Sports at the University of Tübingen. From 1979 to 1984 he was trained and worked as a high school teacher in Stuttgart.

== Political career ==
=== Beginnings in state politics ===
As a Green Party politician, Hermann was elected to the Landtag of Baden-Württemberg in 1984, of which he was a member until 1988.

From 1992 until 1997, Hermann served as co-chair of the Green Party in Baden-Württemberg, alongside Dagmar Dehmer (1992–1993) and Barbara Graf (1995–1997).

=== Member of the German Parliament, 1998–2011 ===
In 1998, Hermann was elected to the Bundestag. He was an MP of the Bundestag until 2011. In this capacity, he served as deputy chairman of the Committee on the Environment, Nature Conservation, Building and Nuclear Safety (1998–2005), member of the Parliamentary Advisory Board on Sustainability (2005–2009) and chairman of the Committee on Transport, Building and Urban Affairs (2009–2011). He was his parliamentary group's spokesperson on environmental policy (2002–2005) and on transportation policy (2005–2009).

While still in parliament, Hermann joined Gerhard Schick, Hans-Christian Ströbele and Anton Hofreiter in their successful 2011 constitutional complaint against the refusal of Chancellor Angela Merkel’s government to provide information on Deutsche Bahn and financial market supervision. In its judgment pronounced in 2017, the Federal Constitutional Court held that the government had indeed failed to fulfil its duty to give answers in response to parliamentary queries and to sufficiently substantiating the reasons.

=== Return to state politics ===
In 2011, Hermann went back to Baden-Württemberg state politics and became State Minister for Transportation in the cabinet of Winfried Kretschmann. He held this position until 2026. As one of his state's representatives at the Bundesrat, he served on the Committee on Transport. In the 2016 state elections, he was also re-elected to the Landtag of Baden-Württemberg.

== Other activities ==
=== State agencies ===
- Federal Network Agency for Electricity, Gas, Telecommunications, Post and Railway (BNetzA), Member of the Rail Infrastructure Advisory Council (2005–2009)
- Federal Agency for Civic Education (BPB), Member of the Board of Trustees (1998–2005)

=== Corporate boards ===
- Stuttgart Airport, Ex-Officio Chairman of the Supervisory Board
- Deutsche Flugsicherung (DFS), Member of the Advisory Board
- Nahverkehrsgesellschaft Baden-Württemberg (NVBW), Ex-Officio Chairman of the Supervisory Board

=== Non-profits ===
- Institut Solidarische Moderne (ISM), Member (since 2010)

== Personal life ==
Hermann lives in Stuttgart. He is married and has one child.
