= Lukas Köhler =

German politician

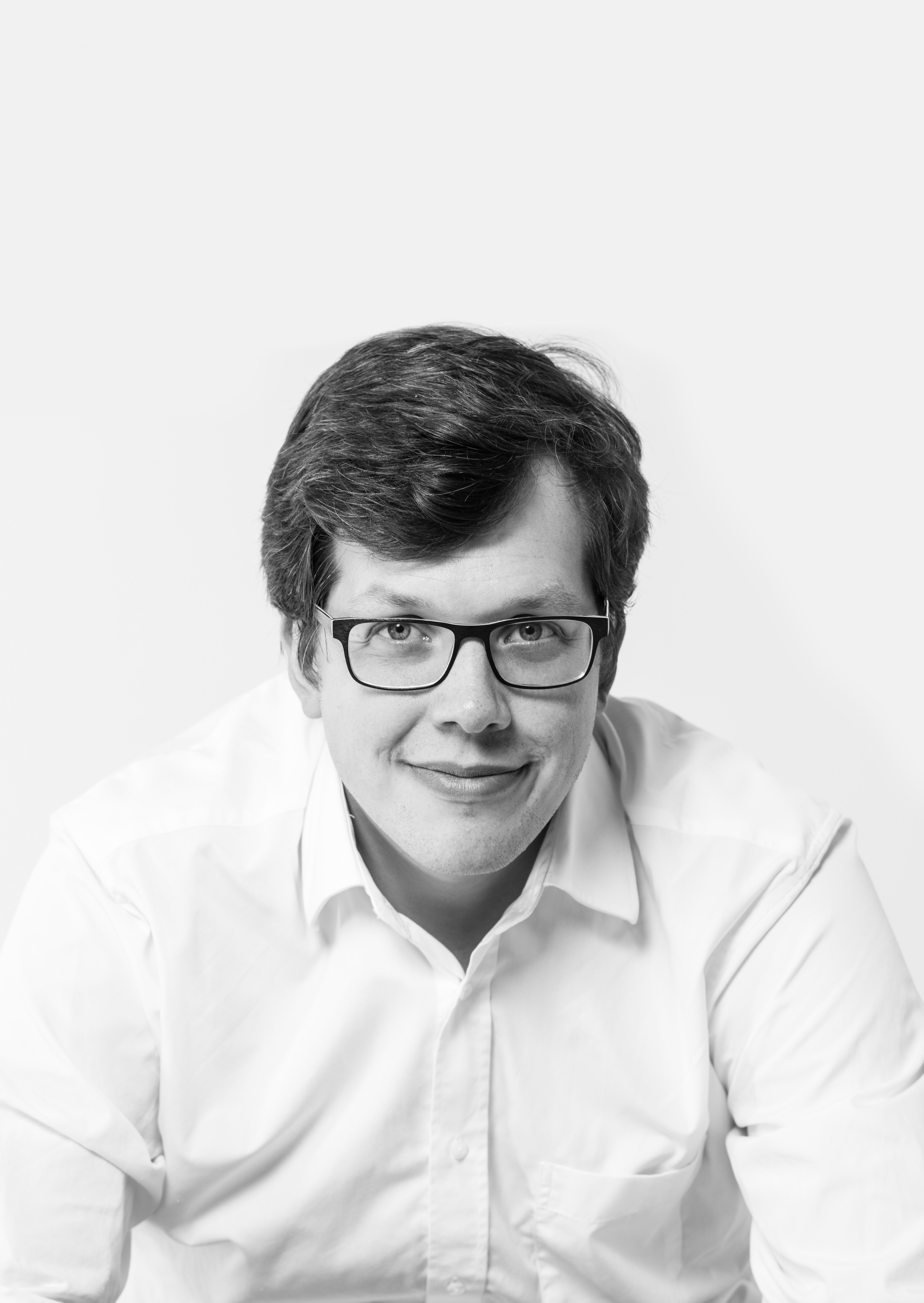
- Köhler in 2017

Member of the Bundestag
- In office 2017–2025

Personal details
- Born: 22 August 1986 (age 40) München, West Germany
- Party: FDP
- Education: Ateneo de Manila University; Munich School of Philosophy

Lukas Köhler (born 22 August 1986) is a German politician of the Free Democratic Party (FDP) who served as a member of the Bundestag from the state of Bavaria from 2017 to 2024.

== Early life and education ==
Born in München, Bavaria, Köhler passed his Abitur examination in Monheim am Rhein in 2005 and, after completing his mandatory civilian service, studied philosophy in Munich with a Baccalaureate degree and in London with a master's degree. From 2011 to 2015 he completed his dissertation at the Munich School of Philosophy. He then took over the management of the Center for Environmental Ethics and Environmental Education there.

== Political career ==
Köhler joined the Young Liberals and the FDP in 2011. From 2014 to 2017, he served as state chairman of the Young Liberals of Bavaria.

From the 2017 elections, Köhler served as a member of the German Bundestag. He was a member of the Committee on the Environment, Nature Conservation and Nuclear Safety, where he served as his parliamentary group’s spokesman for climate policy. He was also member of the Parliamentary Advisory Board on Sustainable Development and a deputy member of the Committee on Human Rights and Humanitarian Aid.

From 2019, Köhler joined forces with Danyal Bayaz on bringing together fellow parliamentarians from the FDP and the Green Party to explore options for a so-called Jamaica coalition government.

In the negotiations to form a so-called traffic light coalition of the Social Democrats (SPD), the Green Party and the FDP following the 2021 federal elections, Köhler led his party's delegation in the working group on environmental policy; his co-chairs from the other parties were Matthias Miersch and Oliver Krischer.

From 2021 to 2024, Köhler served as one of six deputy chairpersons of the FDP parliamentary group under the leadership of its chairman Christian Dürr.

Since 2023, Köhler has been serving as deputy chair of the FDP in Bavaria, under the leadership of co-chairs Katja Hessel and Martin Hagen.

== Other activities ==
- Federal Network Agency for Electricity, Gas, Telecommunications, Post and Railway (BNetzA), Alternate Member of the Advisory Board (since 2022)
- Energy and Climate Policy and Innovation Council (EPICO), Member of the Advisory Board (since 2021)
- Agora Energiewende, Member of the Council
- German Industry Initiative for Energy Efficiency (DENEFF), Member of the Parliamentary Advisory Board
- Munich School of Philosophy, Member of the Board of Trustees
- Bill & Melinda Gates Foundation, Member of the Advisory Board of the Goalkeepers Initiative (2019–2022)
