= Oliver Hildenbrand =

German politician (born 1988)

Member of the Landtag of Baden-Württemberg
- Incumbent
- Assumed office 11 May 2021
- Preceded by: Franz Untersteller
- Constituency: Stuttgart III

Personal details
- Born: 10 February 1988 (age 38) Wertheim
- Party: Alliance 90/The Greens (since 2004)

Oliver Hildenbrand (born 10 February 1988 in Wertheim) is a German politician serving as a member of the Landtag of Baden-Württemberg since 2021. From 2013 to 2021, he served as chairman of the Alliance 90/The Greens Baden-Württemberg.

Since 2026 Hildenbrand is minister for social affaires and health in Baden-Württemberg in Özdemir cabinet.

Hildenbrand is gay.
