= Siegfried Lorek =

German politician (born 1977)

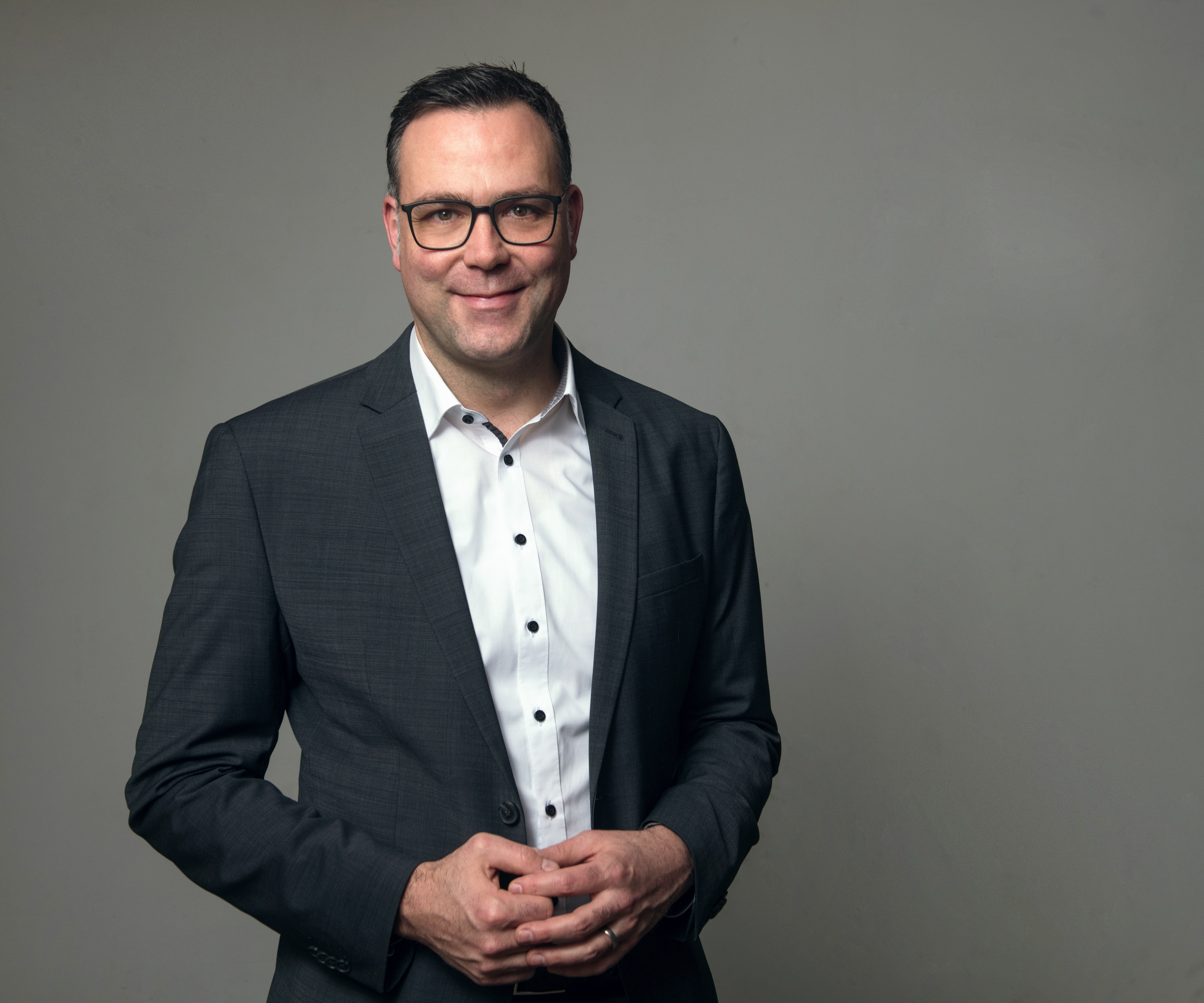
- Lorek in 2020

Member of the Landtag of Baden-Württemberg
- Incumbent
- Assumed office 4 April 2016
- Constituency: Waiblingen

Personal details
- Born: 3 June 1977 (age 48)
- Party: Christian Democratic Union

Siegfried Lorek (born 3 June 1977) is a German politician serving as a member of the Landtag of Baden-Württemberg since 2016. He has served as state secretary of justice and migration since 2021.
