= Florian Haßler =

German politician (born 1977)

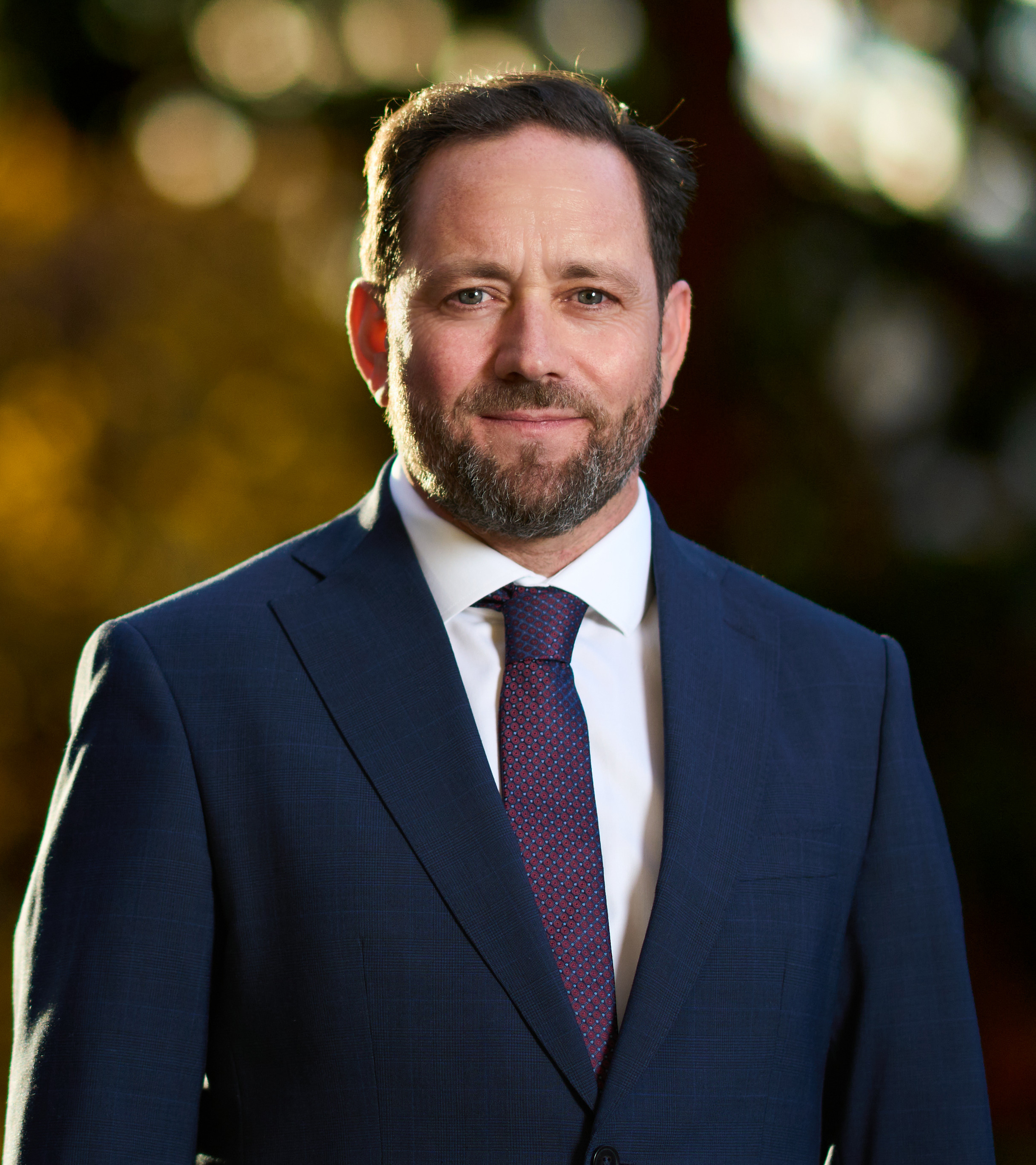
- Haßler in 2025

Member of the Landtag of Baden-Württemberg
- Incumbent
- Assumed office 11 May 2026

Personal details
- Born: 1 September 1977 (age 48)
- Party: Alliance 90/The Greens (since 1999)

Florian Haßler (born 1 September 1977) is a German politician who was elected member of the Landtag of Baden-Württemberg in 2026. He has served as state secretary for political coordination and European and international affairs since 2021.
