= Raimund Haser =

German politician (born 1975)

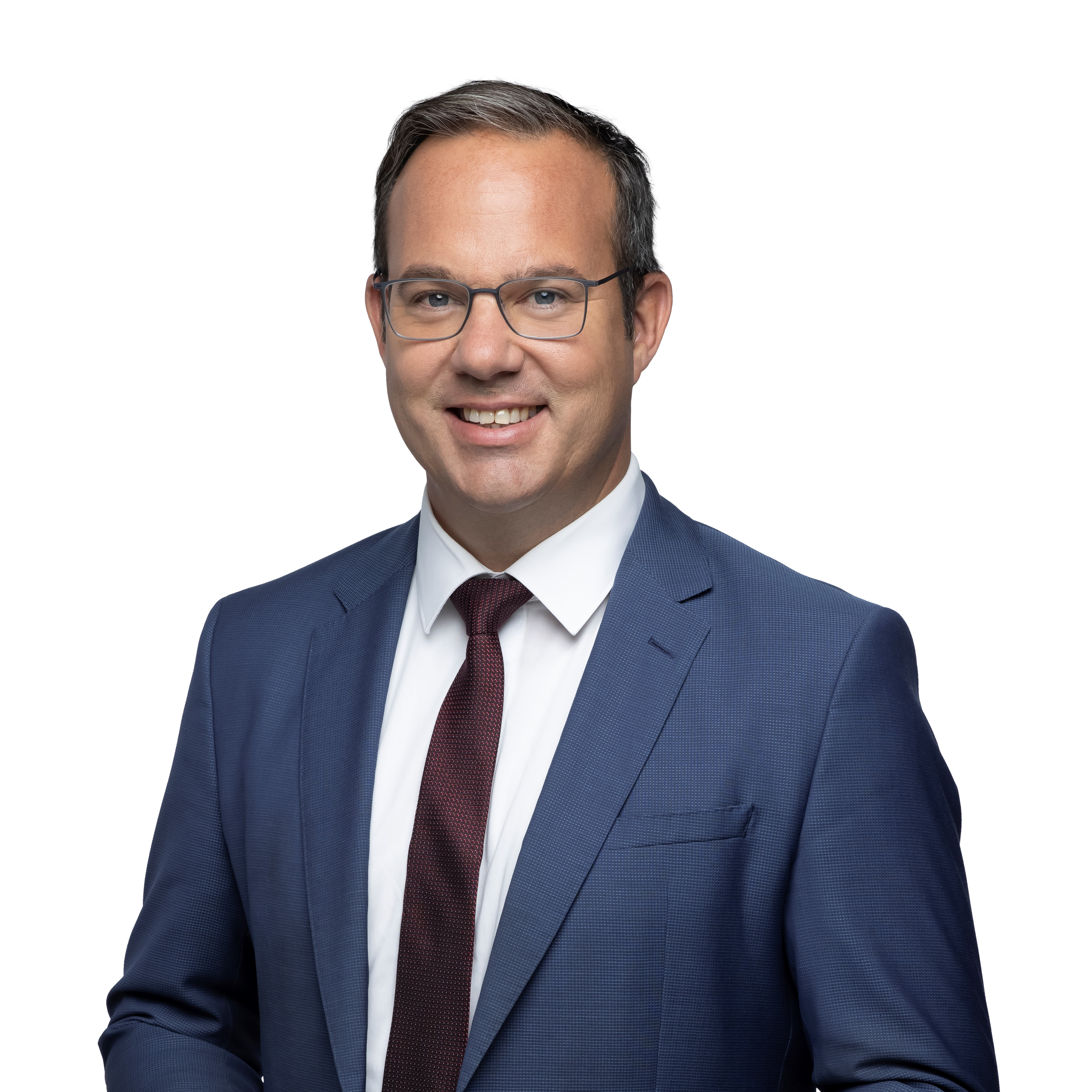
- Haser in 2020

Member of the Landtag of Baden-Württemberg
- Incumbent
- Assumed office 6 April 2016
- Constituency: Wangen

Personal details
- Born: 15 July 1975 (age 50) Wangen im Allgäu
- Party: Christian Democratic Union

Raimund Haser (born 15 July 1975 in Wangen im Allgäu) is a German politician serving as a member of the Landtag of Baden-Württemberg since 2016. He is the chairman of the Christian Democratic Union in Kißlegg.
