= Theresa Schopper =

German politician (born 1961)

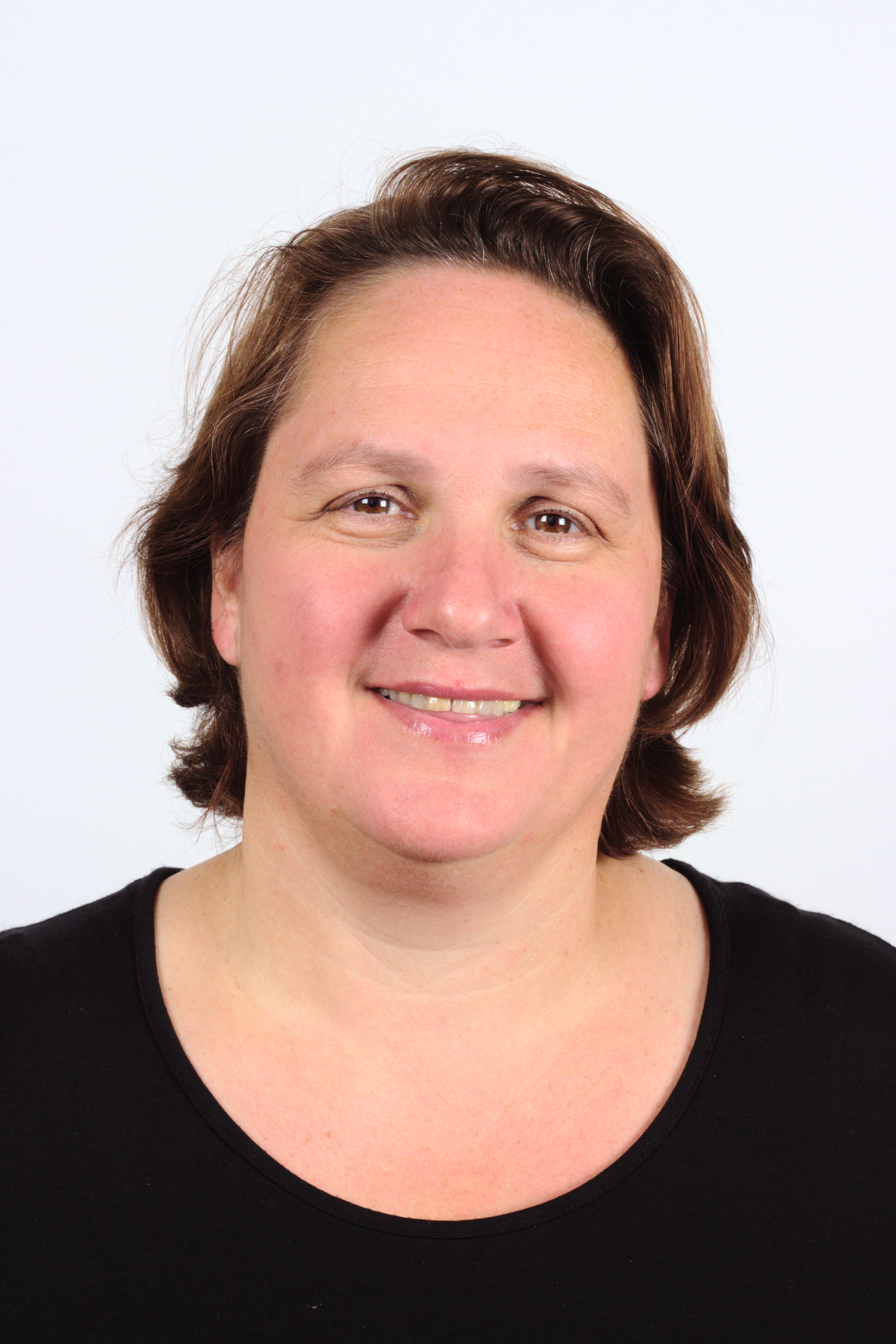
- Schopper in 2012

Minister of Culture, Youth and Sport of Baden-Württemberg
- In office 12 May 2021 – 13 May 2026
- Minister-President: Winfried Kretschmann
- Preceded by: Susanne Eisenmann
- Succeeded by: Andreas Jung

Personal details
- Born: 9 April 1961 (age 65) Füssen, West Germany
- Party: Alliance 90/The Greens (since 1983)

Theresa Schopper (born 9 April 1961) is a German politician serving as minister of culture, youth and sport of Baden-Württemberg since 2021. From 2018 to 2021, she served as minister of state in the state ministry of Baden-Württemberg. From 2003 to 2013, she served as chairwoman of Alliance 90/The Greens in Bavaria. She was a member of the Landtag of Bavaria from 1994 to 2003 and from 2008 to 2013.
