= Marion Gentges =

German politician (born 1971)

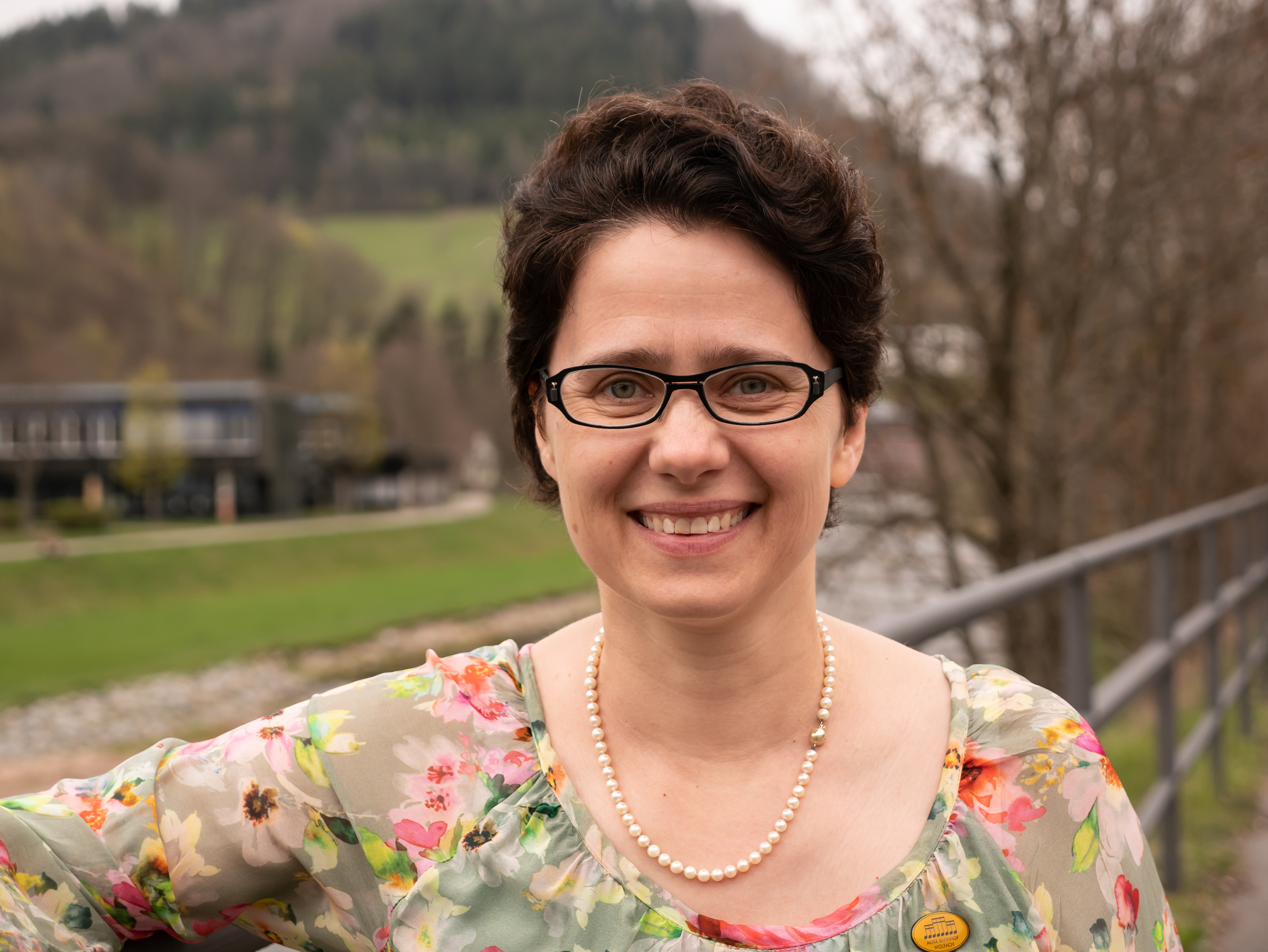
- Gentges in 2021

Minister of Justice and Migration of Baden-Württemberg
- Incumbent
- Assumed office 12 May 2021
- Minister-President: Winfried Kretschmann

Personal details
- Born: 23 August 1971 (age 54) Haslach im Kinzigtal
- Party: Christian Democratic Union (since 1990)

Marion Gentges (born 23 August 1971 in Haslach im Kinzigtal) is a German politician serving as minister of justice and migration of Baden-Württemberg since 2021. She has been a member of the Landtag of Baden-Württemberg since 2016.
