= Thekla Walker =

German politician (born 1969)

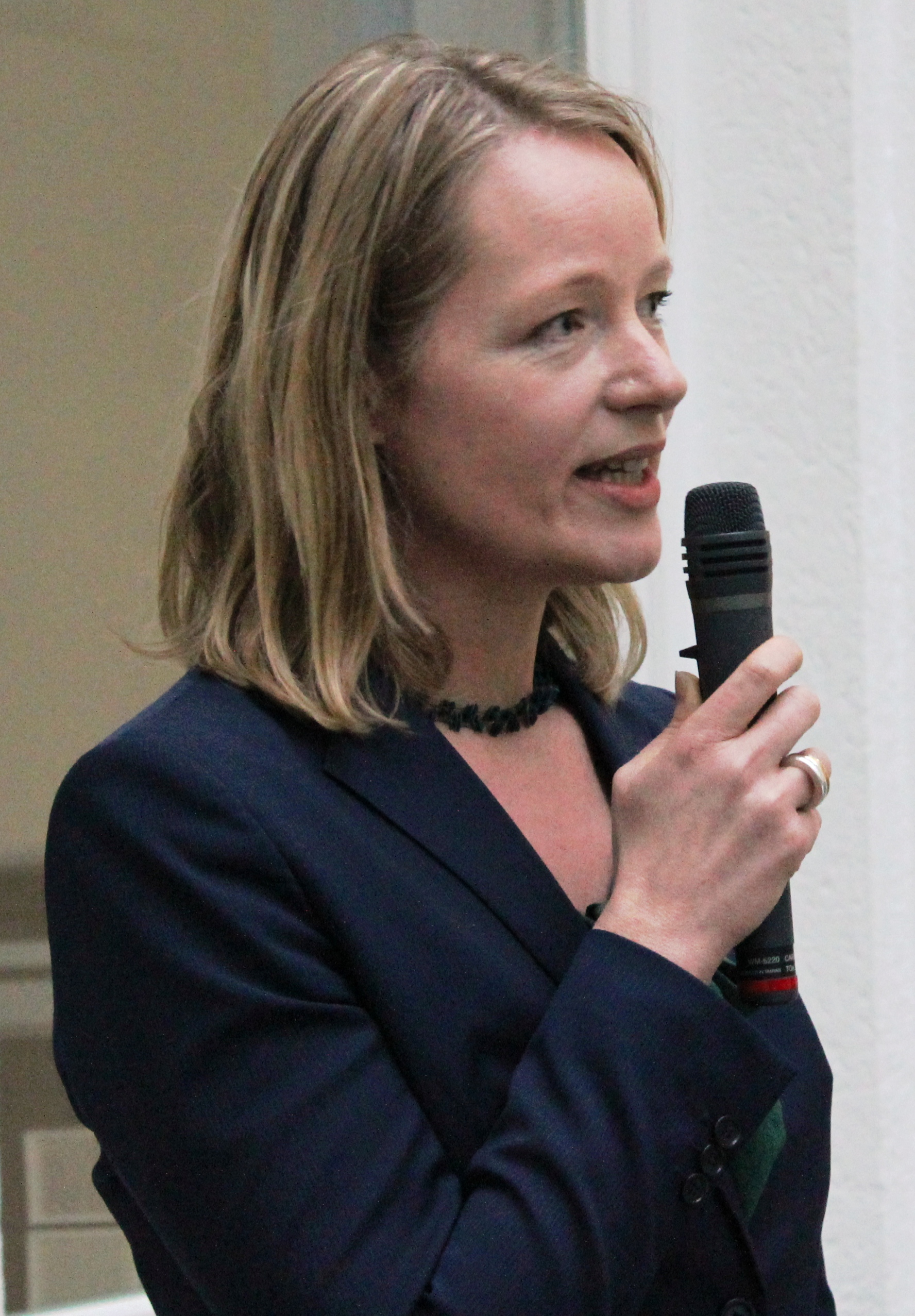
- Walker in 2013

Minister of the Environment, Climate and Energy Sector of Baden-Württemberg
- Incumbent
- Assumed office 12 May 2021
- Minister-President: Winfried Kretschmann; Cem Özdemir
- Preceded by: Franz Untersteller

Personal details
- Born: 28 March 1969 (age 57) Dülmen
- Party: Alliance 90/The Greens (since 2008)

Thekla Walker (born 28 March 1969 in Dülmen) is a German politician of Alliance 90/The Greens who has been serving as State Minister of the Environment, Climate and Energy in the governments of successive Ministers-President Winfried Kretschmann and Cem Özdemir of Baden-Württemberg since 2021. She has been a member of the State Parliament (Landtag) of Baden-Württemberg since 2016, representing the Böblingen electoral district.
