= Hohenlohe (electoral district) =

State electoral district of Germany

21: Hohenlohe
- Electoral district for the Landtag of Baden-Württemberg
- Heilbronn in 2026
- District: Hohenlohe and Schwäbisch Hall
- Electorate: 100,476 (2026)
- Major settlements: Entirety of the district of Hohenlohe and the municipalities of Blaufelden, Braunsbach, Gerabronn, Langenburg, Schrozberg, and Untermünkheim in the Schwäbisch Hall district

Current electoral district
- Party: CDU
- Member: Tim Breitkreuz

Hohenlohe is an electoral constituency (German: Wahlkreis) represented in the Landtag of Baden-Württemberg. Since 2026, it has elected one member via first-past-the-post voting. Voters cast a second vote under which additional seats are allocated proportionally state-wide. Under the constituency numbering system, it is designated as constituency 21. It is split between the districts of Hohenlohe and Schwäbisch Hall.

== Geography ==
The constituency includes the municipalities of entirety of the district of Hohenlohe and the municipalities of Blaufelden, Braunsbach, Gerabronn, Langenburg, Schrozberg, and Untermünkheim, within the district of Schwäbisch Hall.

There were 100,476 eligible voters in 2026.

== Members ==
=== First mandate ===
Both prior to and since the electoral reforms for the 2026 election, the winner of the plurality of the vote (first-past-the-post) in every constituency won the first mandate.

Election	Member	Party	%
1976	Franz Gehweiler	CDU	
Dec 1979	Karl Östreicher	CDU	
1980	Karl Östreicher	CDU	
1984	Karl Östreicher	CDU	
1988	Karl Östreicher	CDU	
1992	Karl Östreicher	CDU	
1996	Karl Hehn	CDU	
2001	Jochen Kübler	CDU	50.9
2006	Jochen Kübler	CDU	49.8
2011	Arnulf von Eyb	CDU	40.7
2016	Arnulf von Eyb	CDU	28.1
2021	Catherine Kern	Grüne	28.7
2026	Tim Breitkreuz	CDU	38.8

=== Second mandate ===
Prior to the electoral reforms for the 2026 election, the seats in the state parliament were allocated proportionately amongst parties which received more than 5% of valid votes across the state. The seats that were won proportionally for parties that did not win as many first mandates as seats they were entitled to, were allocated to their candidates which received the highest proportion of the vote in their respective constituencies. This meant that following some elections, a constituency would have one or more members elected under a second mandate.

Prior to 2011, these second mandates were allocated to the party candidates who got the greatest number of votes, whilst from 2011-2021, these were allocated according to percentage share of the vote.

Prior to 2016, the constituency did not return any second mandate members.

Election	Member	Party	Member	Party
2016	Anton Baron	AfD	Arbulf von Eyb	CDU
2021	Anton Baron	AfD		

== Election results ==
=== 2026 election ===
State election (2026): Hohenlohe
Notes:	Blue background denotes the winner of the electorate vote. Pink background denotes a candidate elected from their party list. Yellow background denotes an electorate win by a list member, or other incumbent. A ✓ or ✗ denotes status of any incumbent, win or lose respectively.						
Party	Candidate	Votes	%	±%	Party votes	%	±%
CDU	Tim Breitkreuz	27,167	38.8	▲14.4	22,896	32.6	▲8.3
AfD	Anton Baron	16,811	24.0	▲9.9	16,667	23.8	▲9.6
Greens	Marion Dietel	13,527	19.3	▼9.4	16,589	23.7	▼5.1
SPD	Jonal Aberle	4,597	6.6	▼5.3	3,607	5.1	▼6.7
FW	Falko Bortt	2,685	3.8	▼0.1	1,752	2.5	▼1.4
FDP	Finn Pfaller	2,412	3.4	▼7.4	3,087	4.4	▼6.5
Left	Matthias Odenwald	1,999	2.9	Steady	1,963	2.8	Steady
BSW	Christin Günther	863	1.2		1,096	1.6	
APT					655	0.9	
Volt					402	0.6	▼0.1
PARTEI					314	0.4	
Bündnis C					244	0.3	
Values					216	0.3	
dieBasis					206	0.3	
ÖDP					131	0.2	▼1.0
Pensioners					104	0.1	
Verjüngungsforschung					61	0.1	
Team Todenhöfer					56	0.1	
PdF					40	0.1	
KlimalisteBW					21	0.0	
Humanists					20	0.0	
Informal votes		537			471		
Total valid votes		70,061			70,127		
Turnout		70,598	70.3	▲7.4			
CDU gain from Greens	Majority	10,356	14.8				

=== 2021 election ===
State election (2026): Hohenlohe
Party	Candidate	Votes	%	±%
Greens	Catherine Kern	17,718	28.7	▲1.6
CDU	Arnulf Freiherr von Eyb	15,027	24.4	▼3.7
AfD	Anton Baron	8,707	14.1	▼3.0
SPD	Patrick Wegener	7,322	11.9	▲0.4
FDP	Uwe Wirkner	6,709	10.9	▲0.9
FW	Jürgen Braun	2,407	3.9	
Left	Simon Brecht	1,730	2.8	▲0.4
WiR2020	Nico Mast	893	1.4	
ÖDP	Ute Göggelmann	707	1.1	▲0.3
Volt	Roland Mettcher	430	0.7	
Majority		2,691	4.3	
Rejected ballots		576	0.9	▼0.3
Turnout		62,226	62.9	▼7.0
Registered electors		98,928		
Greens gain from CDU		Swing		

== See also ==
- Politics of Baden-Württemberg
- Landtag of Baden-Württemberg
