= Heindenheim (electoral district) =

State electoral district of Germany

24: Heidenheim
- Electoral district for the Landtag of Baden-Württemberg
- Heidenheim in 2026
- District: Heidenheim
- Electorate: 92,584 (2026)
- Major settlements: Entirety of the district of Heidenheim

Current electoral district
- Party: CDU
- Member: Michael Kolb

Heidenheim is an electoral constituency (German: Wahlkreis) represented in the Landtag of Baden-Württemberg. Since 2026, it has elected one member via first-past-the-post voting. Voters cast a second vote under which additional seats are allocated proportionally state-wide. Under the constituency numbering system, it is designated as constituency 24.

== Geography ==
The constituency incorporates the entirety of the district of Heidenheim.

There were 92,584 eligible voters in 2026.

== Members ==
=== First mandate ===
Both prior to and since the electoral reforms for the 2026 election, the winner of the plurality of the vote (first-past-the-post) in every constituency won the first mandate.

Election	Member	Party	%
1976	Werner Baumhauer	CDU	
1980	Werner Baumhauer	CDU	
1984	Werner Baumhauer	CDU	
1988	Werner Baumhauer	CDU	
1992	Werner Baumhauer	CDU	
1996	Ingeborg Gräßle	CDU	
2001	Ingeborg Gräßle	CDU	40.6
Jul 2004	Bernd Hitzler	CDU	40.6
2006	Bernd Hitzler	CDU	43.4
2011	Bernd Hitzler	CDU	37.8
2016	Martin Grath	Grüne	26.1
2021	Martin Grath	Grüne	25.8
Sep 2024	Clara Resch	Grüne	25.8
2026	Michael Kolb	CDU	29.0

=== Second mandate ===
Prior to the electoral reforms for the 2026 election, the seats in the state parliament were allocated proportionately amongst parties which received more than 5% of valid votes across the state. The seats that were won proportionally for parties that did not win as many first mandates as seats they were entitled to, were allocated to their candidates which received the highest proportion of the vote in their respective constituencies. This meant that following some elections, a constituency would have one or more members elected under a second mandate.

Prior to 2011, these second mandates were allocated to the party candidates who got the greatest number of votes, whilst from 2011-2021, these were allocated according to percentage share of the vote.

Election	Member	Party	Member	Party
1976	Günter Moser	SPD		
Nov 1977	Siegfried Pommerenke	SPD		
1980	Siegfried Pommerenke	SPD		
Oct 1982	Peter Hund	SPD		
1984	Peter Hund	SPD		
1988	Peter Hund	SPD		
1992	Peter Hund	SPD		
1996	Wolfgang Staiger	SPD		
2001	Wolfgang Staiger	SPD		
2006	Wolfgang Staiger	SPD		
Apr 2009	Andreas Stoch	SPD		
2011	Andreas Stoch	SPD		
2016	Andreas Stoch	SPD	Heiner Merz	AfD
Jul 2020	Andreas Stoch	SPD	Heiner Merz	IND
2021	Andreas Stoch	SPD		

== Election results ==
=== 2026 election ===
State election (2026): Heindenheim
Notes:	Blue background denotes the winner of the electorate vote. Pink background denotes a candidate elected from their party list. Yellow background denotes an electorate win by a list member, or other incumbent. A ✓ or ✗ denotes status of any incumbent, win or lose respectively.						
Party	Candidate	Votes	%	±%	Party votes	%	±%
CDU	Michael Kolb	17,621	29.0	▲6.6	17,444	28.7	▲6.3
AfD	Jürgen Müller	15,119	24.9	▲13.5	14,712	24.2	▲12.8
Greens	✗ Clara Resch	12,221	20.1	▼5.7	15,057	24.7	▼1.1
SPD	Andreas Stoch	9,675	15.9	▼4.2	5,117	8.4	▼11.7
FDP	Klara Sanwald	2,791	4.6	▼3.0	2,321	3.8	▼3.8
Left	Daniel Rolfs	2,075	3.4	▲0.8	1,953	3.2	▲0.6
FW					1,265	2.1	▼1.2
BSW	Maurice Chesauan	871	1.4		1,122	1.8	
APT					524	0.9	
Bündis Deutschland	Petra Hackl	354	0.6				
PARTEI					307	0.5	▼1.2
Volt					229	0.4	
dieBasis					175	0.3	▼1.2
ÖDP					130	0.2	▼1.4
Bündnis C					124	0.2	
Values					117	0.2	
Pensioners					102	0.2	
Team Todenhöfer					56	0.1	
PdF					49	0.1	
Verjüngungsforschung					38	0.1	
Humanists					22	0.0	
KlimalisteBW					15	0.0	▼0.7
Informal votes		537			385		
Total valid votes		60,727			60,879		
Turnout		61,264	66.2	▲6.1			
CDU gain from Greens	Majority	2,502	4.1				

=== 2021 election ===
State election (2026): Heidenheim
Party	Candidate	Votes	%	±%
Greens	Martin Grath	14,273	25.9	▼0.3
CDU	Magnus Welsch	12,361	22.4	▼2.7
SPD	Andreas Stoch	11,133	20.2	▲0.8
AfD	Jens Schneider	6,274	11.4	▼5.8
FDP	Christian Morgenstern	4,224	7.6	▲1.9
FW	Peter Kopstich	1,803	3.3	
Left	Florian Vollert	1,452	2.6	▼0.3
PARTEI	Sebastian Niederberger	959	1.7	
ÖDP	Thomas Georg Junginger	913	1.7	▲0.5
dieBasis	Sam Kambach	815	1.5	
WiR2020	Jörg Preusch	544	1.0	
KlimalisteBW	Michael Stein	388	0.7	
DKP	Vladimir Ott	107	0.2	Steady
Majority		1,912	3.4	
Rejected ballots		410	0.7	▼0.3
Turnout		55,656	60.1	▼6.0
Registered electors		92,576		
Greens hold		Swing		

== See also ==
- Politics of Baden-Württemberg
- Landtag of Baden-Württemberg
