= Stuttgart III (electoral district) =

State electoral district of Germany

3: Stuttgart III
- Electoral district for the Landtag of Baden-Württemberg
- Stuttgart III in 2024
- District: Stuttgart
- Electorate: 88,882 (2026)
- Major settlements: City-districts Botnang, Feuerbach, Münster, Stammheim, Weilimdorf, Zuffenhausen, and Mühlhausen (excluding sub-district Neugereut)

Current electoral district
- Created: 2021
- Party: Green
- Member: Oliver Hildenbrand

Stuttgart III is an electoral constituency (German: Wahlkreis) represented in the Landtag of Baden-Württemberg. Since 2021, it has elected one member via first-past-the-post voting. Voters cast a second vote under which additional seats are allocated proportionally state-wide. Under the constituency numbering system, it is designated as constituency 3. It is wholly within the city of Stuttgart.

== Geography ==
The constituency includes the city-districts of Botnang, Feuerbach, Münster, Stammheim, Weilimdorf, Zuffenhausen, and Mühlhausen (excluding sub-district Neugereut), within the city of Stuttgart.

There were 88,882 eligible voters in 2026.

== Members ==
=== First mandate ===
Both before and after the electoral reforms for the 2026 election, the winner of the plurality of the vote (first-past-the-post) in every constituency won the first mandate.

Election	Member	Party	%
1976	Martin Dorn	CDU	
1980	Martin Dorn	CDU	
1984	Marianne Schultz-Hector	CDU	
1988	Marianne Schultz-Hector	CDU	
1992	Marianne Schultz-Hector	CDU	
1996	Clemens Winckler	CDU	
2001	Clemens Winckler	CDU	
2006	Reinhard Löfflert	CDU	39.1
2011	Reinhard Löfflert	CDU	34.2
2016	Franz Untersteller	Grüne	30.7
2021	Oliver Hildenbrand	Grüne	33.9
2026	Oliver Hildenbrand	Grüne	30.3

=== Second mandate ===
Prior to the electoral reforms for the 2026 election, the seats in the state parliament were allocated proportionately amongst parties which received more than 5% of valid votes across the state. The seats that were won proportionally for parties that did not win as many first mandates as seats they were entitled to, were allocated to their candidates which received the highest proportion of the vote in their respective constituencies. This meant that following some elections, a constituency would have one or more members elected under a second mandate.

Prior to 2011, these second mandates were allocated to the party candidates who got the greatest number of votes, whilst from 2011-2021, these were allocated according to percentage share of the vote.

Election	Member	Party	Member	Party
1976	Joachim Schröder	SPD		
1980	Ulrich Maurer	SPD		
1984	Ulrich Maurer	SPD		
1988	Ulrich Maurer	SPD		
1992	Ulrich Maurer	SPD	Horst Trageiser	REP
1996	Ulrich Maurer	SPD		
2001		SPD		
Oct 2005	Edeltraud Hollay	SPD		
2006				
2011	Franz Untersteller	Grüne		
2016				
2021	Reinhard Löffler	CDU		

== Election results ==
=== 2026 election ===
State election (2026): Stuttgart III
Notes:	Blue background denotes the winner of the electorate vote. Pink background denotes a candidate elected from their party list. Yellow background denotes an electorate win by a list member, or other incumbent. A ✓ or ✗ denotes status of any incumbent, win or lose respectively.						
Party	Candidate	Votes	%	±%	Party votes	%	±%
Greens	✓ Oliver Hildenbrand	17,725	30.3	▼3.5	20,025	34.2	▲0.3
CDU	Shajeevan Thavakkumar	17,010	29.1	▲4.8	15,835	27.0	▲2.7
AfD	Andreas Mürter	9,179	15.7	▲7.8	9,005	15.4	▲7.4
SPD	Laura Streitbürger	4,730	8.1	▼4.1	3,476	5.9	▼6.3
Left	Utz Mörbe	3,526	6.0	▲1.2	3,421	5.8	▲1.0
FDP	Gabriele Heise	3,143	5.4	▼5.3	2,918	5.0	▼5.7
BSW	Chedly Seefeld-Sahraoui	1,208	2.1		1,079	1.8	
FW					630	1.1	▼0.8
Volt	Tillmann Bollow	1,006	1.7	▲1.1	616	1.1	▲0.4
APT					527	0.9	
PARTEI	Franz Xaver Lallinger	707	1.2	▼0.4	295	0.5	▼1.1
Team Todenhöfer					161	0.3	
dieBasis					121	0.2	
Values					109	0.2	
Bündnis C	Christian Papentin	179	0.3		99	0.2	
ÖDP					88	0.2	▼0.4
Pensioners					80	0.1	
Verjüngungsforschung					41	0.1	
Humanists					32	0.1	
KlimalisteBW					31	0.1	▼0.8
PdF					29	0.0	
Informal votes		475			270		
Total valid votes		58,413			58,618		
Turnout		58,888	66.3	▲6.4			
Greens hold	Majority	715	1.2	▼8.4			

=== 2021 election ===
State election (2026): Stuttgart III
Party	Candidate	Votes	%	±%
Greens	Oliver Hildenbrand	18,010	33.9	▲3.2
CDU	Reinhard Löffler	12,935	24.3	▲0.8
SPD	Sarah Schlösser	6,485	12.2	▼0.7
FDP	Jürgen Gert Reichert	5,663	10.6	▲1.5
AfD	Andreas Mürter	4,231	8.0	▼7.3
Left	Aynur Karlikli	2,559	4.8	▲0.4
FW	Bernhard Barutta	996	1.9	
PARTEI	Victor Gogröf	841	1.6	
KlimalisteBW	Sarah Leininger	436	0.8	
WiR2020	Ingo Lau	369	0.7	
Volt	Yannick Weber	355	0.7	
ÖDP	Sascha Fröhlich	316	0.6	▲0.1
Majority		5,075	9.6	
Rejected ballots		204	0.4	▼0.2
Turnout		53,400	59.9	▼10.0
Registered electors				
Greens hold		Swing		

== See also ==
- Politics of Baden-Württemberg
- Landtag of Baden-Württemberg
