= Ludwigsburg (Landtag electoral district) =

State electoral district of Germany

12: Ludwigsburg
- Electoral district for the Landtag of Baden-Württemberg
- Ludwigsburg in 2026
- District: Ludwigsburg
- Electorate: 123,266 (2026)
- Major settlements: Asperg, Kornwestheim, Ludwigsburg, Möglingen, Remseck am Neckar, and Tamm

Current electoral district
- Party: CDU
- Member: Lukas Tietze

Ludwigsburg is an electoral constituency (German: Wahlkreis) represented in the Landtag of Baden-Württemberg. Since 2026, it has elected one member via first-past-the-post voting. Voters cast a second vote under which additional seats are allocated proportionally state-wide. Under the constituency numbering system, it is designated as constituency 12. It is wholly within the district of Ludwigsburg.

== Geography ==
The constituency includes the municipalities of Asperg, Kornwestheim, Ludwigsburg, Möglingen, Remseck am Neckar, and Tamm, within the district of Ludwigsburg.

There were 123,266 eligible voters in 2026.

== Members ==
=== First mandate ===
Both prior to and since the electoral reforms for the 2026 election, the winner of the plurality of the vote (first-past-the-post) in every constituency won the first mandate.

Election	Member	Party	%
1976	Rolf Schoeck	CDU	
1980	Karl Lang	CDU	
1984	Karl Lang	CDU	
1988	Karl Lang	CDU	
1992	Karl Lang	CDU	
1996	Klaus Herrmann	CDU	
2001	Klaus Herrmann	CDU	
2006	Klaus Herrmann	CDU	38.8
2011	Klaus Herrmann	CDU	35.1
2016	Jürgen Walter	Grüne	33.5
2021	Silke Gericke	Grüne	34.6
2026	Lukas Tietze	CDU	32.8

=== Second mandate ===
Prior to the electoral reforms for the 2026 election, the seats in the state parliament were allocated proportionately amongst parties which received more than 5% of valid votes across the state. The seats that were won proportionally for parties that did not win as many first mandates as seats they were entitled to, were allocated to their candidates which received the highest proportion of the vote in their respective constituencies. This meant that following some elections, a constituency would have one or more members elected under a second mandate.

Prior to 2011, these second mandates were allocated to the party candidates who got the greatest number of votes, whilst from 2011-2021, these were allocated according to percentage share of the vote.

Election	Member	Party	Member	Party	Member	Party
1976	Hans Beerstecher	SPD	Wolfram Bergerowski	FDP		
1980	Hans Beerstecher	SPD				
1984	Hans Beerstecher	SPD				
1988	Hans Beerstecher	SPD				
1992	Claus Schmiedel	SPD	Jürgen Walter	Grüne	Wolfram Krisch	REP
1996	Claus Schmiedel	SPD	Jürgen Walter	Grüne	Wolfram Krisch	REP
2001	Claus Schmiedel	SPD	Jürgen Walter	Grüne		
2006	Claus Schmiedel	SPD	Jürgen Walter	Grüne		
2011	Claus Schmiedel	SPD	Jürgen Walter	Grüne		
2016						
2021

== Election results ==
=== 2026 election ===
State election (2026): Ludwigsburg
Notes:	Blue background denotes the winner of the electorate vote. Pink background denotes a candidate elected from their party list. Yellow background denotes an electorate win by a list member, or other incumbent. A ✓ or ✗ denotes status of any incumbent, win or lose respectively.						
Party	Candidate	Votes	%	±%	Party votes	%	±%
CDU	Lukas Tietze	28,105	32.8	▲10.7	23,771	27.7	▲5.5
Greens	✗ Silke Gericke	25,079	29.3	▼5.3	29,102	33.9	▼0.7
AfD	Christoforos Tsoulopoulos	14,004	16.4	▲7.6	14,071	16.4	▲7.7
SPD	Nathalie Ziwey	6,412	7.5	▼4.6	4,822	5.6	▼6.4
Left	Nadja Schmidt	5,581	6.5	▲2.3	4,445	5.2	▲1.0
FDP	Wolfgang Vogt	4,071	4.8	▼6.4	4,042	4.7	▼6.5
FW					1,376	1.6	▼1.0
BSW					1,304	1.5	
Volt	Henrik Metje	1,180	1.4		710	0.8	
APT					597	0.7	
PARTEI					329	0.4	▼1.3
dieBasis	Stephan Johne	742	0.9	Steady	316	0.4	▼0.5
Team Todenhöfer					207	0.2	
ÖDP	Sascha Fröhlich	438	0.5	▼0.1	171	0.2	▼0.4
Pensioners					139	0.2	
Values					134	0.2	
Bündnis C					129	0.2	
Verjüngungsforschung					50	0.1	
PdF					47	0.1	
KlimalisteBW					40	0.0	▼0.7
Humanists					39	0.0	
Informal votes		633			404		
Total valid votes		85,612			85,841		
Turnout		86,245	70.0	▲5.8			
CDU gain from Greens	Majority	3,026	3.5				

=== 2021 election ===
State election (2026): Ludwigsburg
Party	Candidate	Votes	%	±%
Greens	Silke Gericke	27,107	34.6	▲1.1
CDU	Andrea Wechsler	17,366	22.2	▼1.0
SPD	Colin Sauerzapf	9,439	12.1	▼0.9
FDP	Stefanie Knecht	8,767	11.2	▲2.3
AfD	Friedemann Meyer	6,827	8.7	▼6.3
Left	Nadja Schmidt	3,266	4.2	▲1.3
FW	Jan Rittaler	2,038	2.6	
PARTEI	Sina Nietz	1,322	1.7	▲1.0
dieBasis	Andreas Roll	653	0.8	
KlimalisteBW	Magnus Rembold	607	0.8	
ÖDP	Josef Wagner	460	0.6	▼0.1
WiR2020	Peter Feuerstack	459	0.6	
Majority		9,741	12.4	
Rejected ballots		441	0.6	▼0.2
Turnout		78,752	64.2	▼7.3
Registered electors		122,745		
Greens hold		Swing		

== See also ==
- Politics of Baden-Württemberg
- Landtag of Baden-Württemberg
