= Heilbronn (Landtag electoral district) =

State electoral district of Germany

18: Heilbronn
- Electoral district for the Landtag of Baden-Württemberg
- Heilbronn in 2026
- District: Heilbronn (city) and Heilbronn (district)
- Electorate: 99,537 (2026)
- Major settlements: Heilbronn (city) and the municipalities of Flein, Leingarten, Nordheim, and Talheim of Heilbronn (district)

Current electoral district
- Party: CDU
- Member: Thomas Strobl

Heilbronn is an electoral constituency (German: Wahlkreis) represented in the Landtag of Baden-Württemberg. Since 2026, it has elected one member via first-past-the-post voting. Voters cast a second vote under which additional seats are allocated proportionally state-wide. Under the constituency numbering system, it is designated as constituency 18. It incorporates the whole of the city of Heilbronn, and parts of Heilbronn (district).

== Geography ==
The constituency includes the whole of the city of Heilbronn, and the municipalities of Flein, Leingarten, Nordheim, and Talheim, within the district of Heilbronn (district).

There were 99,537 eligible voters in 2026.

== Members ==
=== First mandate ===
Both prior to and since the electoral reforms for the 2026 election, the winner of the plurality of the vote (first-past-the-post) in every constituency won the first mandate.

Election	Member	Party	%
1976	Ulrich Stechele	CDU	
1980	Ulrich Stechele	CDU	
1984	Ulrich Stechele	CDU	
1988	Dieter Spöri	SPD	
1992	Dieter Spöri	SPD	
1996	Johanna Lichy	CDU	
2001	Johanna Lichy	CDU	42.6
2006	Johanna Lichy	CDU	42.4
2011	Alexander Throm	CDU	37.0
2016	Susanne Bay	Grüne	27.1
2021	Susanne Bay	Grüne	30.0
Feb 2022	Gudula Achterberg	Grüne	30.0
2026	Thomas Strobl	CDU	30.6

=== Second mandate ===
Prior to the electoral reforms for the 2026 election, the seats in the state parliament were allocated proportionately amongst parties which received more than 5% of valid votes across the state. The seats that were won proportionally for parties that did not win as many first mandates as seats they were entitled to, were allocated to their candidates which received the highest proportion of the vote in their respective constituencies. This meant that following some elections, a constituency would have one or more members elected under a second mandate.

Prior to 2011, these second mandates were allocated to the party candidates who got the greatest number of votes, whilst from 2011-2021, these were allocated according to percentage share of the vote.

Election	Member	Party	Member	Party	Member	Party
1976	Günter Erlewein	SPD				
1980	Günter Erlewein	SPD				
1984	Günter Erlewein	SPD				
1988						
1992
1996	Dieter Spöri	SPD				
Feb 1997						
2001
2006
2011
2016	Rainer Hinderer	SPD	Nico Weinmann	FDP	Rainer Podeswa	AfD
2021	Rainer Hinderer	SPD	Nico Weinmann	FDP		

== Election results ==
=== 2026 election ===
State election (2026): Heilbronn
Notes:	Blue background denotes the winner of the electorate vote. Pink background denotes a candidate elected from their party list. Yellow background denotes an electorate win by a list member, or other incumbent. A ✓ or ✗ denotes status of any incumbent, win or lose respectively.						
Party	Candidate	Votes	%	±%	Party votes	%	±%
CDU	Thomas Strobl	19,088	30.6	▲7.6	16,821	26.9	▲3.9
AfD	Maximilian Decker	13,876	22.2	▲10.3	13,874	22.2	▲10.2
Greens	✗ Gudula Achterberg	13,441	21.5	▼8.4	17,025	27.2	▼2.8
SPD	Tanja Sagasser-Beil	5,413	8.7	▼3.0	4,061	6.5	▼5.1
FDP	Nico Weinmann	5,030	8.1	▼4.3	3,495	5.6	▼6.7
Left	Hiba Mohammad Charif	2,925	4.7	▲1.1	2,780	4.4	▲0.9
BSW	Joachim Tabler	1,330	2.1		1,244	2.0	
FW					879	1.4	▼0.6
APT					565	0.9	
Volt	Ignaz Simon	794	1.3	▲0.6	515	0.8	▲0.2
PARTEI					281	0.4	▼1.2
dieBasis					252	0.4	▼0.4
Team Todenhöfer	Ismat El Beik	300	0.5		191	0.3	
Values					136	0.2	
ÖDP	Julian Ostfalk	266	0.4	▼0.3	119	0.2	▼0.5
Pensioners					114	0.2	
Bündnis C					86	0.1	
PdF					38	0.1	
Verjüngungsforschung					37	0.1	
KlimalisteBW					33	0.1	▼0.6
Humanists					33	0.1	
Informal votes		526			410		
Total valid votes		62,463			62,579		
Turnout		62,989	63.3	▲3.0			
CDU gain from Greens	Majority	5,212	8.4				

=== 2021 election ===
State election (2026): Heilbronn
Party	Candidate	Votes	%	±%
Greens	Susanne Bay	17,845	30.0	▲2.9
CDU	Thomas Strobl	13,694	23.0	▲0.3
FDP	Nico Weinmann	7,341	12.3	▲2.1
AfD	Michael Seher	7,117	12.0	▼6.2
SPD	Rainer Hinderer	6,921	11.6	▼3.4
Left	Marlene Neumann	2,118	3.6	▲0.7
FW	Alfred Burkhardt	1,212	2.0	
PARTEI	Patryk Dzadz	986	1.7	▲0.8
WiR2020	Yves Alexander	671	1.1	
dieBasis	Ulrich Kappl	480	0.8	
ÖDP	Rita Stein	405	0.7	▼0.1
Volt	Cédric Creusot	396	0.7	
KlimalisteBW	Peter Titus	361	0.6	
Majority		4,151	7.0	
Rejected ballots		468	0.8	▼0.4
Turnout		60,015	60.3	▼5.9
Registered electors		99,489		
Greens hold		Swing		

== See also ==
- Politics of Baden-Württemberg
- Landtag of Baden-Württemberg
