= Stuttgart IV (electoral district) =

State electoral district of Germany

4: Stuttgart IV
- Electoral district for the Landtag of Baden-Württemberg
- Stuttgart IV in 2024
- District: Stuttgart
- Electorate: 90,251 (2026)
- Major settlements: City-districts Bad Cannstatt, Hedelfingen, Obertürkheim, Untertürkheim, Wangen, and Stuttgart-Ost (excluding sub-districts Gänsheide and Uhlandshöhe); sub-district Neugereut of Mühlhausen city-district

Current electoral district
- Created: 2021
- Party: Green
- Member: Petra Olschowski

Stuttgart IV is an electoral constituency (German: Wahlkreis) represented in the Landtag of Baden-Württemberg. Since 2021, it has elected one member via first-past-the-post voting. Voters cast a second vote under which additional seats are allocated proportionally state-wide. Under the constituency numbering system, it is designated as constituency 4. It is wholly within the city of Stuttgart.

== Geography ==
The constituency includes the city-districts of Bad Cannstatt, Hedelfingen, Obertürkheim, Untertürkheim, Wangen, and Stuttgart-Ost (excluding sub-districts Gänsheide and Uhlandshöhe); sub-district Neugereut of Mühlhausen city-district, within the city of Stuttgart.

There were 90,251 eligible voters in 2026.

== Members ==
=== First mandate ===
Both before and after the electoral reforms for the 2026 election, the winner of the plurality of the vote (first-past-the-post) in every constituency won the first mandate.

Election	Member	Party	%
1976	Horst Poller	CDU	
1980	Horst Poller	CDU	
1984	Horst Poller	CDU	
1988	Franz Longin	CDU	
1992	Helga Ulmer	SPD	
1996	Roland Schmid	CDU	
2001	Inge Utzt	SPD	
2006	Michael Föll	CDU	37.2
Oct 2008	Ilse Unold	CDU	37.2
2011	Franz Untersteller	Grüne	32.3
2016	Franz Untersteller	Grüne	34.4
2021	Petra Olschowski	Grüne	35.6
2026	Petra Olschowski	Grüne	33.6

=== Second mandate ===
Prior to the electoral reforms for the 2026 election, the seats in the state parliament were allocated proportionately amongst parties which received more than 5% of valid votes across the state. The seats that were won proportionally for parties that did not win as many first mandates as seats they were entitled to, were allocated to their candidates which received the highest proportion of the vote in their respective constituencies. This meant that following some elections, a constituency would have one or more members elected under a second mandate.

Prior to 2011, these second mandates were allocated to the party candidates who got the greatest number of votes, whilst from 2011-2021, these were allocated according to percentage share of the vote.

Election	Member	Party	Member	Party
1976	Liselotte Bühler	SPD	Volker Klenk	FDP
1980	Liselotte Bühler	SPD		
1984	Liselotte Bühler	SPD		
1988	Liselotte Bühler	SPD		
1992				
1996
2001
2006
2011
2016
2021	Katrin Steinhülb-Joos	SPD		

== Election results ==
=== 2026 election ===
State election (2026): Stuttgart IV
Notes:	Blue background denotes the winner of the electorate vote. Pink background denotes a candidate elected from their party list. Yellow background denotes an electorate win by a list member, or other incumbent. A ✓ or ✗ denotes status of any incumbent, win or lose respectively.						
Party	Candidate	Votes	%	±%	Party votes	%	±%
Greens	✓ Petra Olschowski	19,670	33.6	▼2.0	22,715	38.7	▲3.1
CDU	Markus Reiners	16,222	27.7	▲6.2	13,692	23.3	▲1.8
AfD	Christian Köhler	7,121	12.2	▲6.3	7,152	12.2	▲6.3
Left	Luna Monteiro Bailey	5,750	9.8	▲2.8	5,163	8.8	▲1.8
SPD	Katrin Steinhülb-Joos	5,261	9.0	▼4.3	3,549	6.0	▼7.2
FDP	Juliane Becker	2,082	3.6	▼6.1	2,442	4.2	▼5.5
BSW	Patrick Moreira Costeira	1,119	1.9		1,143	1.9	
Volt	Benjamin Hueber	1,102	1.9	▲1.0	660	1.1	▲0.3
FW					660	1.1	▼0.5
APT					453	0.8	
PARTEI					315	0.5	▼1.2
Bündnis Deutschland	Iprahim Tozman	227	0.4				
Team Todenhöfer					129	0.2	
ÖDP					106	0.2	▼0.2
dieBasis					92	0.2	▼0.5
Values					84	0.1	
Bündnis C					82	0.1	
Pensioners					70	0.1	
PdF					51	0.1	
KlimalisteBW					48	0.1	▼0.9
Verjüngungsforschung					34	0.1	▼0.3
Humanists					31	0.1	
Informal votes		393			276		
Total valid votes		58,554			58,671		
Turnout		58,947	65.3	▲5.7			
Greens hold	Majority	3,448	5.9	▼8.2			

=== 2021 election ===
State election (2026): Stuttgart IV
Party	Candidate	Votes	%	±%
Greens	Petra Olschowski	19,386	35.6	▲1.2
CDU	Roland Schmid	11,731	21.5	▼0.7
SPD	Katrin Steinhülb-Joos	7,207	13.2	▼0.3
FDP	Thilo Scholpp	5,278	9.7	▲1.7
Left	Ursula Beck	3,822	7.0	▲1.1
AfD	Jörg Feuerbacher	3,181	5.8	▼6.2
PARTEI	Daniel Kannenberg	946	1.7	
FW	Ralf Wendel	883	1.6	
KlimalisteBW	Christian Reitter	560	1.0	
Volt	Jan König	468	0.9	
dieBasis	Monika Toljan	342	0.6	
ÖDP	Patrick Zolg	201	0.4	▼0.1
Verjüngungsforschung	Karen Konrad	194	0.4	
WiR2020	Sabine Mayer-Paris	241	0.4	
Majority		7,455	14.1	
Rejected ballots		199	0.4	▼0.2
Turnout		54,639	59.6	▼9.1
Registered electors		91,723		
Greens hold		Swing		

== See also ==
- Politics of Baden-Württemberg
- Landtag of Baden-Württemberg
