= Main-Tauber (electoral district) =

State electoral district of Germany

23: Main-Tauber
- Electoral district for the Landtag of Baden-Württemberg
- Main-Tauber in 2026
- District: Main-Tauber
- Electorate: 100,874 (2026)
- Major settlements: Entirety of the district of Main-Tauber

Current electoral district
- Party: CDU
- Member: Wolfgang Reinhart

Main-Tauber is an electoral constituency (German: Wahlkreis) represented in the Landtag of Baden-Württemberg. Since 2026, it has elected one member via first-past-the-post voting. Voters cast a second vote under which additional seats are allocated proportionally state-wide. Under the constituency numbering system, it is designated as constituency 23.

== Geography ==
The constituency incorporates the entirety of the district of Main-Tauber.

There were 100,874 eligible voters in 2026.

== Members ==
=== First mandate ===
Both prior to and since the electoral reforms for the 2026 election, the winner of the plurality of the vote (first-past-the-post) in every constituency won the first mandate.

Election	Member	Party	%
1976	Albert Reuter	CDU	
1980	Albert Reuter	CDU	
1984	Albert Reuter	CDU	
1988	Albert Reuter	CDU	
1992	Wolfgang Reinhart	CDU	
1996	Wolfgang Reinhart	CDU	
2001	Wolfgang Reinhart	CDU	50.6
2006	Wolfgang Reinhart	CDU	54.4
2011	Wolfgang Reinhart	CDU	47.7
2016	Wolfgang Reinhart	CDU	35.4
2021	Wolfgang Reinhart	CDU	29.6
2026	Wolfgang Reinhart	CDU	41.6

=== Second mandate ===
Prior to the electoral reforms for the 2026 election, the seats in the state parliament were allocated proportionately amongst parties which received more than 5% of valid votes across the state. The seats that were won proportionally for parties that did not win as many first mandates as seats they were entitled to, were allocated to their candidates which received the highest proportion of the vote in their respective constituencies. This meant that following some elections, a constituency would have one or more members elected under a second mandate.

Prior to 2011, these second mandates were allocated to the party candidates who got the greatest number of votes, whilst from 2011-2021, these were allocated according to percentage share of the vote.

The only instance of a member being elected with a second mandate was for the AfD in 2016.

Election	Member	Party
2016	Christina Baum	AfD

== Election results ==
=== 2026 election ===
State election (2026): Main-Tauber
Notes:	Blue background denotes the winner of the electorate vote. Pink background denotes a candidate elected from their party list. Yellow background denotes an electorate win by a list member, or other incumbent. A ✓ or ✗ denotes status of any incumbent, win or lose respectively.						
Party	Candidate	Votes	%	±%	Party votes	%	±%
CDU	✓ Wolfgang Reinhart	29,107	41.6	▲12.1	25,676	36.5	▲7.0
Greens	Gerd Bayer	14,987	21.4	▼5.7	16,306	23.2	▼3.9
AfD	Jeannete Fischer	14,166	20.3	▲9.6	14,361	20.4	▲9.8
SPD	Can Kurter	5,014	7.2	▼3.3	3,903	5.6	▼4.9
FDP	Artur Schmidt	2,833	4.1	▼4.4	2,484	3.5	▼4.9
Left	Robert Binder	2,604	3.7	▲1.3	2,197	3.1	▲0.7
FW					1,868	2.7	▼3.5
BSW					848	1.2	
APT					671	1.0	
dieBasis	Elisabeth Beck	1,186	1.7	▲0.8	422	0.6	▼0.2
Volt					347	0.5	
PARTEI					310	0.4	▼1.0
ÖDP					229	0.3	▼0.9
Pensioners					179	0.3	
Values					124	0.2	
Bündnis C					84	0.1	
Team Todenhöfer					76	0.1	
PdF					54	0.1	
Verjüngungsforschung					47	0.1	
KlimalisteBW					36	0.1	▼0.4
Humanists					31	0.0	
Informal votes		904			548		
Total valid votes		69,897			70,253		
Turnout		70,801	70.2	▲6.4			
CDU hold	Majority	15,880	20.2	▲17.8			

=== 2021 election ===
State election (2026): Main-Tauber
Party	Candidate	Votes	%	±%
CDU	Wolfgang Reinhart	18,776	29.5	▼5.9
Greens	Leonhard Haaf	17,252	27.1	▲5.8
AfD	Christina Baum	6,770	10.6	▼6.6
SPD	Anton Mattmüller	6,630	10.4	▼1.1
FDP	Jürgen Vossler	5,371	8.4	▲0.9
FW	Stefan Grimm	3,895	6.1	
Left	Robert Binder	1,534	2.4	▼0.4
PARTEI	Saskia Streit	926	1.5	
ÖDP	Monika Diez	796	1.3	▼0.3
WiR2020	Tobias Romberg	767	1.2	
dieBasis	Anne Kruttschnitt	539	0.8	
KlimalisteBW	Thorsten Kolberg	317	0.5	
Majority		1,524	2.4	
Rejected ballots		572	0.9	▼0.1
Turnout		64,145	63.8	▼6.5
Registered electors		100,502		
CDU hold		Swing		

== See also ==
- Politics of Baden-Württemberg
- Landtag of Baden-Württemberg
