= Wiesloch (electoral district) =

State electoral district of Germany

37: Wiesloch
- Electoral district for the Landtag of Baden-Württemberg
- Wiesloch in 2026
- District: Rhein-Neckar-Kreis
- Electorate: 100,911 (2026)
- Major settlements: Dielheim, Leimen, Malsch, Mühlhausen, Nußloch, Rauenberg, Sandhausen, St. Leon-Rot, Walldorf, and Wiesloch

Current electoral district
- Party: CDU
- Member: Christiane Staab

Wiesloch is an electoral constituency (German: Wahlkreis) represented in the Landtag of Baden-Württemberg.

Since 2026, it has elected one member via first-past-the-post voting. Voters cast a second vote under which additional seats are allocated proportionally state-wide. Under the constituency numbering system, it is designated as constituency 37.

It is wholly within the district of Rhein-Neckar-Kreis.

== Geography ==
The constituency includes the municipalities of Dielheim, Leimen, Malsch, Mühlhausen, Nußloch, Rauenberg, Sandhausen, St. Leon-Rot, Walldorf, and Wiesloch, within the district of Rhein-Neckar-Kreis.

There were 100,911 eligible voters in 2026.

== Members ==
=== First mandate ===
Both prior to and since the electoral reforms for the 2026 election, the winner of the plurality of the vote (first-past-the-post) in every constituency won the first mandate.

Election	Member	Party	%
1992	Michael Sieber	CDU	
1996	Michael Sieber	CDU	
2001	Michael Sieber	CDU	46.7
2006	Karl Klein	CDU	49.1
2011	Karl Klein	CDU	39.7
2016	Karl Klein	CDU	28.4
2021	Norbert Knopf	Grüne	29.7
2026	Christiane Staab	CDU	34.6

=== Second mandate ===
Prior to the electoral reforms for the 2026 election, the seats in the state parliament were allocated proportionately amongst parties which received more than 5% of valid votes across the state. The seats that were won proportionally for parties that did not win as many first mandates as seats they were entitled to, were allocated to their candidates which received the highest proportion of the vote in their respective constituencies. This meant that following some elections, a constituency would have one or more members elected under a second mandate.

Prior to 2011, these second mandates were allocated to the party candidates who got the greatest number of votes, whilst from 2011-2021, these were allocated according to percentage share of the vote.

Prior to 2011, this constituency did not elect any members on a second mandate.

Election	Member	Party
2011	Kai Schmidt-Eisenlohr	Grüne
2016	Claudia Martin	AfD
Dec 2016	Claudia Martin	IND
Nov 2017	Claudia Martin	CDU
2021	Christiane Staab	CDU

== Election results ==
=== 2026 election ===
State election (2026): Wiesloch
Notes:	Blue background denotes the winner of the electorate vote. Pink background denotes a candidate elected from their party list. Yellow background denotes an electorate win by a list member, or other incumbent. A ✓ or ✗ denotes status of any incumbent, win or lose respectively.						
Party	Candidate	Votes	%	±%	Party votes	%	±%
CDU	Christiane Staab	23,751	34.6	▲8.0	19,853	28.9	▲2.2
Greens	Yannick Veits	16,759	24.4	▼5.2	19,537	28.4	▼1.2
AfD	Thomas Nitz	12,473	19.6	▲8.5	13,444	19.5	▲8.4
SPD	Xenia Rösch	6,690	9.8	▼2.4	4,947	7.2	▼5.0
FDP	Claudia Felden	3,862	5.6	▼3.7	3,300	4.8	▼4.6
Left	Marlon Käsemann	2,698	3.9	▲1.2	2,739	4.0	▲1.2
FW					1,249	1.8	▼0.9
BSW					915	1.3	
Volt	Mike Matthes	1,352	2.0	▲1.2	839	1.2	▲0.5
APT					748	1.1	
PARTEI					352	0.5	▼1.1
dieBasis					170	0.2	▼0.7
Pensioners					149	0.2	
Team Todenhöfer					107	0.2	
Values					104	0.2	
Bündnis C					92	0.1	
ÖDP					61	0.1	▼0.4
PdF					50	0.1	
Verjüngungsforschung					47	0.1	
Humanists					43	0.1	
KlimalisteBW					39	0.1	▼0.8
Informal votes		645			445		
Total valid votes		68,585			68,785		
Turnout		69,230	68.6	▲5.2			
CDU gain from Greens	Majority	6,992	10.2				

=== 2021 election ===
State election (2021): Wiesloch
Party	Candidate	Votes	%	±%
Greens	Norbert Knopf	18,518	29.7	▲1.5
CDU	Christiane Staab	16,621	26.6	▼1.8
SPD	Andrea Schröder-Ritzrau	7,585	12.1	▼0.2
AfD	Achim Köhler	6,975	11.2	▼7.4
FDP	Thorsten Krings	5,856	9.4	▲2.0
Left	Heinrich Stürtz	1,732	2.8	▲0.2
FW	Holger Fritz	1,665	2.7	
PARTEI	Martin Graßhoff	1,037	1.7	
dieBasis	Alexander Höfer	609	1.0	
KlimalisteBW	Sandra Herden	553	0.9	
WiR2020	Jochen Rothermel	526	0.8	
Volt	Pavel Mihaylov	478	0.8	
ÖDP	Maik Schmidt	300	0.5	
Majority		1,897	3.1	
Rejected ballots		586	0.9	▼0.3
Turnout		63,041	63.4	▼7.6
Registered electors		99,366		
Greens gain from CDU		Swing		

== See also ==
- Politics of Baden-Württemberg
- Landtag of Baden-Württemberg
