= Pforzheim (Landtag electoral district) =

State electoral district of Germany

42: Pforzheim
- Electoral district for the Landtag of Baden-Württemberg
- Pforzheim in 2026
- District: Pforzheim and Enzkreis (partial)
- Electorate: 90,963 (2026)
- Major settlements: Pforzheim, Birkenfeld, Engelsbrand, Ispringen, and Kieselbronn

Current electoral district
- Party: CDU
- Member: Andreas Renner

Pforzheim is an electoral constituency (German: Wahlkreis) represented in the Landtag of Baden-Württemberg.

Since 2026, it has elected one member via first-past-the-post voting. Voters cast a second vote under which additional seats are allocated proportionally state-wide. Under the constituency numbering system, it is designated as constituency 42.

It is split between the city of Pforzheim and the district of Enzkreis.

== Geography ==
The constituency incorporates the entirety of the city of Pforzheim, and the districts of Birkenfeld, Engelsbrand, Ispringen, and Kieselbronn within the district of Enzkreis.

There were 90,963 eligible voters in 2026.

== Members ==
=== First mandate ===
Both prior to and since the electoral reforms for the 2026 election, the winner of the plurality of the vote (first-past-the-post) in every constituency won the first mandate.

Election	Member	Party	%
1976	Hugo Leicht	CDU	
1980	Hugo Leicht	CDU	
1984	Hugo Leicht	CDU	
1988	Hugo Leicht	CDU	
1992	Hugo Leicht	CDU	
1996	Stefan Mappus	CDU	
2001	Stefan Mappus	CDU	
2006	Stefan Mappus	CDU	45.9
2011	Stefan Mappus	CDU	44.5
Sep 2011	Marianne Engeser	CDU	
2016	Bernd Grimmer	AfD	24.2
2021	Felix Herkens	Grüne	26.2
2026	Andreas Renner	CDU	31.0

=== Second mandate ===
Prior to the electoral reforms for the 2026 election, the seats in the state parliament were allocated proportionately amongst parties which received more than 5% of valid votes across the state. The seats that were won proportionally for parties that did not win as many first mandates as seats they were entitled to, were allocated to their candidates which received the highest proportion of the vote in their respective constituencies. This meant that following some elections, a constituency would have one or more members elected under a second mandate.

Prior to 2011, these second mandates were allocated to the party candidates who got the greatest number of votes, whilst from 2011-2021, these were allocated according to percentage share of the vote.

Prior to 1992, this constituency did not elect any members on a second mandate.

Election	Member	Party	Member	Party
1992	Willi Auer	REP		
Sep 1993				
1996
2001
2006
2011
2016	Hans-Ulrich Rülke	FDP		
2021	Hans-Ulrich Rülke	FDP	Bernd Grimmer	AfD
Jan 2022	Hans-Ulrich Rülke	FDP	Alfred Bamberger	AfD

== Election results ==
=== 2026 election ===
State election (2026): Pforzheim
Notes:	Blue background denotes the winner of the electorate vote. Pink background denotes a candidate elected from their party list. Yellow background denotes an electorate win by a list member, or other incumbent. A ✓ or ✗ denotes status of any incumbent, win or lose respectively.						
Party	Candidate	Votes	%	±%	Party votes	%	±%
CDU	Andreas Renner	16,187	31.0	▲10.9	13,604	25.9	▲5.8
AfD	Alexsei Zimmer	13,998	26.8	▲11.0	13,871	26.4	▲10.6
Greens	Simon Schwarz	8,980	17.2	▼9.1	12,400	23.6	▼2.6
FDP	Hans-Ulrich Rülke	5,244	10.0	▼6.1	3,711	7.1	▼9.1
SPD	Annkathrin Wulff	4,319	8.3	▼1.9	2,593	4.9	▼5.2
Left	Marvin Weiß	2,690	5.1	▲1.9	2,303	4.4	▲1.1
BSW					879	1.7	
APT					726	1.4	
FW					629	1.2	▼3.2
Volt	Regine Neuweiler-Tran	864	1.7	▲0.8	492	0.9	▲0.1
Team Todenhöfer					366	0.7	
PARTEI					227	0.4	
Bündnis C					157	0.3	
Values					128	0.2	
Pensioners					107	0.2	
dieBasis					96	0.2	
ÖDP					77	0.1	▼0.5
Humanists					41	0.1	
Verjüngungsforschung					41	0.1	
PdF					32	0.1	
KlimalisteBW					28	0.1	▼0.7
Informal votes		553			327		
Total valid votes		52,282			52,508		
Turnout		52,835	58.7	▲4.7			
CDU gain from Greens	Majority	2,189	4.2				

== See also ==
- Politics of Baden-Württemberg
- Landtag of Baden-Württemberg
