= Stuttgart II (Landtag electoral district) =

State electoral district of Germany

2: Stuttgart II
- Electoral district for the Landtag of Baden-Württemberg
- Stuttgart II in 2024
- District: Stuttgart
- Electorate: 91,262 (2026)
- Major settlements: City-districts Birkach, Degerloch, Möhringen, Plieningen, Sillenbuch, and Vaihingen

Current electoral district
- Created: 2026
- Party: Green
- Member: Cem Özdemir

Stuttgart II is an electoral constituency (German: Wahlkreis) represented in the Landtag of Baden-Württemberg. Since 2021, it has elected one member via first-past-the-post voting. Voters cast a second vote under which additional seats are allocated proportionally state-wide. Under the constituency numbering system, it is designated as constituency 2. It is wholly within the city of Stuttgart.

== Geography ==
The constituency includes the city-districts of Birkach, Degerloch, Möhringen, Plieningen, Sillenbuch, and Vaihingen, within the city of Stuttgart.

There were 91,262 eligible voters in 2026.

== Members ==
=== First mandate ===
Both before and after the electoral reforms for the 2021 election, the winner of the plurality of the vote (first-past-the-post) in every constituency won the first mandate.

Election	Member	Party	%
1976	Hildegard Schwigon	CDU	
1980	Gerhard Mayer-Vorfelder	CDU	
1984	Gerhard Mayer-Vorfelder	CDU	
1988	Gerhard Mayer-Vorfelder	CDU	
1992	Gerhard Mayer-Vorfelder	CDU	
1996	Gerhard Mayer-Vorfelder	CDU	
2001	Christoph Palmer	CDU	
2006	Christoph Palmer	CDU	38.0
Jun 2008	Thomas Bopp	CDU	38.0
2011	Werner Wölfle	Grüne	34.2
Nov 2011	Nikolaus Tschenk	Grüne	34.2
2016	Winfried Hermann	Grüne	37.2
2021	Winfried Hermann	Grüne	39.8
2026	Cem Özdemir	Grüne	47.9

=== Second mandate ===
Prior to the electoral reforms of 2021, the seats in the state parliament were allocated proportionately amongst parties which received more than 5% of valid votes across the state. The seats that were won proportionally for parties that did not win as many first mandates as seats they were entitled to, were allocated to their candidates which received the highest proportion of the vote in their respective constituencies. This meant that following some elections, a constituency would have one or more members elected under a second mandate.

Prior to 2011, these second mandates were allocated to the party candidates who got the greatest number of votes, whilst from 2011-2021, these were allocated according to percentage share of the vote.

Election	Member	Party	Member	Party	Member	Party
1976	Friedrich Haag Sr.	FDP	Wilfried Helmstädter	SPD		
1980	Friedrich Haag Sr.	FDP	Joachim Schröder	SPD	Elsbeth Mordo	Grüne
1984	Friedrich Haag Sr.	FDP	Helga Solinger	SPD	Winfried Hermann	Grüne
1988	Friedrich Haag Sr.	FDP	Helga Solinger	SPD	Rezzo Schlauch	Grüne
1992	Ekkehard Kiesswetter	FDP	Helga Solinger	SPD	Fritz Kuhn	Grüne
1996	Ekkehard Kiesswetter	FDP	Helga Solinger	SPD	Fritz Kuhn	Grüne
Jul 2000	Ekkehard Kiesswetter	FDP	Helga Solinger	SPD	Phillip Müller	Grüne
2001			Ruth Weckenmann	SPD		
2006	Dietmar Bachmann	FDP			Werner Wölfle	Grüne
2011						
2016	Gabriele Reich-Gutjahr	FDP				
2021	Friedrich Haag Jr.	FDP				

== Election results ==
=== 2026 election ===
State election (2026): Stuttgart II
Notes:	Blue background denotes the winner of the electorate vote. Pink background denotes a candidate elected from their party list. Yellow background denotes an electorate win by a list member, or other incumbent. A ✓ or ✗ denotes status of any incumbent, win or lose respectively.						
Party	Candidate	Votes	%	±%	Party votes	%	±%
Greens	Cem Özdemir	33,004	47.9	▲8.1	26,799	38.9	▼0.9
CDU	Klaus Nopper	17,230	25.0	▲3.3	19,327	28.1	▲6.3
AfD	Steffen Degler	6,023	8.7	▲3.9	6,464	9.4	▲4.5
FDP	Friedrich Haag	4,547	6.6	▼6.3	4,536	6.6	▼6.3
SPD	Sara Dahme	3,325	4.8	▼5.2	3,721	5.4	▼4.6
Left	Faisal Osman	2,470	3.6	▼0.8	3,946	5.7	▲1.4
BSW	Ronald Stock	879	1.3		959	1.4	
Volt	Andreas Lehrfeld	687	1.0	▲0.1	917	1.3	▲0.5
FW					710	1.0	▼0.4
APT	Sandra Just	517	0.8		492	0.7	
PARTEI					262	0.4	▼1.0
Bündnis C					124	0.2	
ÖDP	Dieter Zielke	166	0.2	▼0.3	123	0.2	▼0.4
dieBasis					82	0.1	▼0.5
Team Todenhöfer					82	0.1	
Pensioners					58	0.1	
PdF					51	0.1	
KlimalisteBW					49	0.1	▼0.8
Humanists					36	0.1	
Verjüngungsforschung					32	0.0	
Informal votes		285			243		
Total valid votes		68,848			68,890		
Turnout		69,133	75.8	▲5.9			
Greens hold	Majority	15,774	22.9	▲4.8			

=== 2021 election ===
State election (2026): Stuttgart 2
Party	Candidate	Votes	%	±%
Greens	Winfried Hermann	25,524	39.8	▲2.6
CDU	Susanne Eisenmann	13,928	21.7	▼2.7
FDP	Friedrich Haag	8,273	12.9	▲2.2
SPD	Carsten Singer	6,413	10.0	▼0.6
AfD	Sigrid Borst	3,131	4.9	▼5.7
Left	Lisa Neher	2,798	4.4	▲1.1
FW	Michael Mattig-Gerlach	927	1.4	
PARTEI	Fabian Westenberg	893	1.4	
KlimalisteBW	Yvonne Sauter	573	0.9	
Volt	Andreas Jakobi	563	0.9	
dieBasis	Dirk Michels	375	0.6	
ÖDP	Dieter Baur	373	0.6	▲0.1
WiR2020	Monika Roussos	319	0.5	
Majority		11,596	18.1	
Rejected ballots		161	0.3	▼0.2
Turnout		64,251	69.9	▼7.5
Registered electors		91,940		
Greens hold		Swing		

== See also ==
- Politics of Baden-Württemberg
- Landtag of Baden-Württemberg
