= Ettlingen (electoral district) =

State electoral district of Germany

31: Ettlingen
- Electoral district for the Landtag of Baden-Württemberg
- Ettlingen in 2026
- District: Karlsruhe
- Electorate: 94,209 (2026)
- Major settlements: Ettlingen, Karlsbad, Malsch, Marxzell, Pfinztal, Rheinstetten, and Waldbronn

Current electoral district
- Party: CDU
- Member: Lorenzo Saladino

Ettlingen is an electoral constituency (German: Wahlkreis) represented in the Landtag of Baden-Württemberg.

Since 2026, it has elected one member via first-past-the-post voting. Voters cast a second vote under which additional seats are allocated proportionally state-wide. Under the constituency numbering system, it is designated as constituency 31.

It is wholly within the district of Karlsruhe.

== Geography ==
The constituency includes the municipalities of Ettlingen, Karlsbad, Malsch, Marxzell, Pfinztal, Rheinstetten, and Waldbronn, within the district of Karlsruhe.

There were 94,209 eligible voters in 2026.

== Members ==
=== First mandate ===
Both prior to and since the electoral reforms for the 2026 election, the winner of the plurality of the vote (first-past-the-post) in every constituency won the first mandate.

Election	Member	Party	%
1976	Camill Siegwarth	CDU	
1980	Jürgen Eisele	CDU	
1984	Jürgen Eisele	CDU	
1988	Jürgen Eisele	CDU	
1992	Erwin Vetter	CDU	
1996	Erwin Vetter	CDU	
2001	Erwin Vetter	CDU	48.4
2006	Werner Raab	CDU	46.7
2011	Werner Raab	CDU	41.0
2016	Barbara Saebel	Grüne	29.5
2021	Barbara Saebel	Grüne	33.5
2026	Lorenzo Saladino	CDU	35.1

=== Second mandate ===
Prior to the electoral reforms for the 2026 election, the seats in the state parliament were allocated proportionately amongst parties which received more than 5% of valid votes across the state. The seats that were won proportionally for parties that did not win as many first mandates as seats they were entitled to, were allocated to their candidates which received the highest proportion of the vote in their respective constituencies. This meant that following some elections, a constituency would have one or more members elected under a second mandate.

Prior to 2011, these second mandates were allocated to the party candidates who got the greatest number of votes, whilst from 2011-2021, these were allocated according to percentage share of the vote.

Prior to 2011, this constituency did not elect any members on a second mandate.

Election	Member	Party	Member	Party
2011	Frank Mentrup	SPD		
Mar 2013	Anneke Graner	SPD		
2016	Christine Neumann	CDU		
2021	Christine Neumann	CDU	Alena Trauschel	FDP

== Election results ==
=== 2026 election ===
State election (2026): Ettlingen
Notes:	Blue background denotes the winner of the electorate vote. Pink background denotes a candidate elected from their party list. Yellow background denotes an electorate win by a list member, or other incumbent. A ✓ or ✗ denotes status of any incumbent, win or lose respectively.						
Party	Candidate	Votes	%	±%	Party votes	%	±%
CDU	Lorenzo Saladino	23,939	35.1	▲10.8	21,288	31.0	▲6.8
Greens	Kai Keune	17,850	26.1	▼7.4	21,344	31,1	▼2.4
AfD	Thomas Kastell	10,969	16.1	▲6.6	10,874	15.8	▲6.4
SPD	Anneke Graner	6,764	9.9	▼1.9	4,348	6.3	▼5.5
FDP	Alena Fink-Trauschel	4,268	6.3	▼4.0	3,270	4.8	▼5.5
Left	Lars Rinn	2,987	4.4	▲1.6	2,605	3.8	▲1.0
FW					1,257	1.8	▼1.4
BSW					896	1.3	
Volt	Markus Schulz-Ritz	1,503	2.2		861	1.3	
APT					723	1.1	
PARTEI					297	0.4	▼1.2
Bündnis C					183	0.3	
dieBasis					159	0.2	▼0.8
Pensioners					108	0.2	
Values					102	0.1	
Team Todenhöfer					95	0.1	
ÖDP					76	0.1	▼0.4
Verjüngungsforschung					43	0.1	
KlimalisteBW					42	0.1	▼0.9
Humanists					39	0.1	
PdF					35	0.1	
Informal votes		793			428		
Total valid votes		68,280			68,645		
Turnout		69,073	73.3	▲5.7			
CDU gain from Greens	Majority	6,089	9.0				

=== 2021 election ===
State election (2026): Ettlingen
Party	Candidate	Votes	%	±%
Greens	Barbara Saebel	21,148	33.5	▲4.0
CDU	Christine Neumann	15,297	24.2	▼4.6
SPD	Aisha Fahir	7,457	11.8	▼2.0
FDP	Alena Trauschel	6,457	10.2	▲1.7
AfD	Michael Blos	5,979	9.5	▼4.6
FW	Steffen Schmid	2,025	3.2	
Left	Jörg Rupp	1,759	2.8	▲0.3
PARTEI	Leon Siebert	1,001	1.6	▲0.5
dieBasis	Judith Richwien	643	1.0	
KlimalisteBW	Cordula Markert	604	1.0	
WiR2020	Karin Wappler-Ruff	434	0.7	
ÖDP	Georg-Maria Austermann	297	0.5	
Majority		5,851	9.3	
Rejected ballots		493	0.8	▼0.2
Turnout		63,594	67.6	▼6.3
Registered electors		94,043		
Greens hold		Swing		

== See also ==
- Politics of Baden-Württemberg
- Landtag of Baden-Württemberg
