= Timm Kern =

German politician (born 1972)

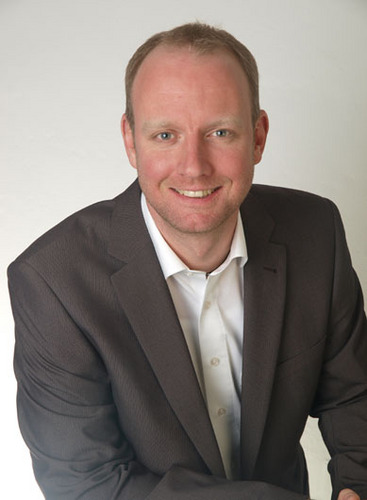
- Kern in 2011

Member of the Landtag of Baden-Württemberg
- Incumbent
- Assumed office 12 April 2011
- Constituency: Freudenstadt

Personal details
- Born: 7 February 1972 (age 54) Tübingen
- Party: Free Democratic Party (since 1989)

Timm Peter Kern (born 7 February 1972 in Tübingen) is a German politician serving as a member of the Landtag of Baden-Württemberg since 2011. He has served as deputy group leader of the Free Democratic Party since 2013.
