= Kehl (electoral district) =

State electoral district of Germany

52: Kehl
- Electoral district for the Landtag of Baden-Württemberg
- Kehl in 2026
- District: Ortenaukreis
- Electorate: 107,391 (2026)
- Major settlements: Achern, Appenweier, Kappelrodeck, Kehl, Lauf, Lautenbach, Oberkirch, Ottenhöfen im Schwarzwald, Renchen, Rheinau, Sasbach, Sasbachwalden, Seebach, and Willstätt

Current electoral district
- Party: CDU
- Member: Katrin Merkel

Kehl is an electoral constituency (German: Wahlkreis) represented in the Landtag of Baden-Württemberg.

Since 2026, it has elected one member via first-past-the-post voting. Voters cast a second vote under which additional seats are allocated proportionally state-wide. Under the constituency numbering system, it is designated as constituency 52.

It is wholly within the district of Ortenaukreis.

== Geography ==
The constituency includes the municipalities of Achern, Appenweier, Kappelrodeck, Kehl, Lauf, Lautenbach, Oberkirch, Ottenhöfen im Schwarzwald, Renchen, Rheinau, Sasbach, Sasbachwalden, Seebach, and Willstätt, within the district of Ortenaukreis.

There were 107,391 eligible voters in 2026.

== Members ==
=== First mandate ===
Both prior to and since the electoral reforms for the 2026 election, the winner of the plurality of the vote (first-past-the-post) in every constituency won the first mandate.

Election	Member	Party	%
1976	Erwin Braun	CDU	
1980	Erwin Braun	CDU	
Oct 1981	Felix Hodapp	CDU	
1984	Felix Hodapp	CDU	
1988	Felix Hodapp	CDU	
1992	Willi Stächele	CDU	
1996	Willi Stächele	CDU	
2001	Willi Stächele	CDU	54.7
2006	Willi Stächele	CDU	48.6
2011	Willi Stächele	CDU	45.3
2016	Willi Stächele	CDU	30.8
2021	Berndt Mettenleiter	Grüne	31.4
2026	Katrin Merkel	CDU	34.1

=== Second mandate ===
Prior to the electoral reforms for the 2026 election, the seats in the state parliament were allocated proportionately amongst parties which received more than 5% of valid votes across the state. The seats that were won proportionally for parties that did not win as many first mandates as seats they were entitled to, were allocated to their candidates which received the highest proportion of the vote in their respective constituencies. This meant that following some elections, a constituency would have one or more members elected under a second mandate.

Prior to 2011, these second mandates were allocated to the party candidates who got the greatest number of votes, whilst from 2011-2021, these were allocated according to percentage share of the vote.

Prior to 2016, this constituency did not elect any members on a second mandate.

Election	Member	Party
2016	Stefan Räpple	AfD
Sep 2020	Stefan Räpple	IND
2021	Willi Stächele	CDU

== Election results ==
=== 2026 election ===
State election (2026): Kehl
Notes:	Blue background denotes the winner of the electorate vote. Pink background denotes a candidate elected from their party list. Yellow background denotes an electorate win by a list member, or other incumbent. A ✓ or ✗ denotes status of any incumbent, win or lose respectively.						
Party	Candidate	Votes	%	±%	Party votes	%	±%
CDU	Ketrin Merkel	24,248	34.1	▲7.0	22,874	32.1	▲5.0
Greens	Bernd Mettenleiter	15,308	21.5	▼9.9	17,331	24.3	▼7.1
AfD	Thomas Kinzinger	14,977	21.1	▲11.3	15,480	21.7	▲12.0
FDP	Sanja Tömmes	4,455	6.3	▼3.1	3,258	4.6	▼4.8
SPD	Raphael Kupferer	4,454	6.3	▼2.5	3,873	5.4	▼3.3
FW	Adolf Huber	3,126	4.4	▼0.5	2,204	3.2	▼1.8
Left	Amelie Quotadamo	2,202	3.1	▲0.5	2,282	3.2	▲0.6
BSW	Bernhard Falk	1,106	1.6		1,224	1.7	
APT					780	1.1	
Volt	Christian Hübner	662	0.9	▲0.5	444	0.6	▲0.1
Values	Jörg Meuthen	562	0.8		371	0.5	
PARTEI					273	0.4	
dieBasis					251	0.4	▼3.2
Pensioners					136	0.2	
Bündnis C					94	0.1	
Team Todenhöfer					78	0.1	
ÖDP					73	0.1	▼0.6
Verjüngungsforschung					49	0.1	
PdF					49	0.1	
KlimalisteBW					29	0.0	▼0.7
Humanists					24	0.0	
Informal votes		624			547		
Total valid votes		71,100			71,177		
Turnout		71,724	66.8	▲5.4			
CDU gain from Greens	Majority	8,940	12.6				

== See also ==
- Politics of Baden-Württemberg
- Landtag of Baden-Württemberg
