= Mannheim II (electoral district) =

State electoral district of Germany

36: Mannheim II
- Electoral district for the Landtag of Baden-Württemberg
- Mannheim II in 2026
- District: Mannheim
- Electorate: 103,668 (2026)
- Major settlements: Feudenheim, Friedrichsfeld, Innenstadt/Jungbusch, Lindenhof, Neckarau, Neuostheim/Neuhermsheim, Rheinau, and Schwetzingerstadt/Oststadt

Current electoral district
- Party: Green
- Member: Elke Zimmer

Mannheim II is an electoral constituency (German: Wahlkreis) represented in the Landtag of Baden-Württemberg.

Since 2026, it has elected one member via first-past-the-post voting. Voters cast a second vote under which additional seats are allocated proportionally state-wide. Under the constituency numbering system, it is designated as constituency 36.

It is wholly within the city of Mannheim.

== Geography ==
The constituency includes the districts of Feudenheim, Friedrichsfeld, Innenstadt/Jungbusch, Lindenhof, Neckarau, Neuostheim/Neuhermsheim, Rheinau, and Schwetzingerstadt/Oststadt within the city of Mannheim.

There were 103,668 eligible voters in 2026.

== Members ==
=== First mandate ===
Both prior to and since the electoral reforms for the 2026 election, the winner of the plurality of the vote (first-past-the-post) in every constituency won the first mandate.

Election	Member	Party	%
1992	Gerhard Bloemecke	CDU	
1996	Gerhard Bloemecke	CDU	
2001	Klaus Dieter Reichardt	CDU	40.7
2006	Klaus Dieter Reichardt	CDU	38.6
Mar 2011	Rebekka Schmitt-Illert	CDU	38.6
2011	Wolfgang Raufelder	Grüne	29.6
2016	Wolfgang Raufelder	Grüne	31.4
Dec 2016	Elke Zimmer	Grüne	31.4
2021	Elke Zimmer	Grüne	35.9
2026	Elke Zimmer	Grüne	32.4

=== Second mandate ===
Prior to the electoral reforms for the 2026 election, the seats in the state parliament were allocated proportionately amongst parties which received more than 5% of valid votes across the state. The seats that were won proportionally for parties that did not win as many first mandates as seats they were entitled to, were allocated to their candidates which received the highest proportion of the vote in their respective constituencies. This meant that following some elections, a constituency would have one or more members elected under a second mandate.

Prior to 2011, these second mandates were allocated to the party candidates who got the greatest number of votes, whilst from 2011-2021, these were allocated according to percentage share of the vote.

Election	Member	Party
1992	Rolf Seltenreich	SPD
1996	Rolf Seltenreich	SPD
2001	Rolf Seltenreich	SPD
2006	Helen Heberer	SPD
2011	Helen Heberer	SPD
2016	Boris Weirauch	SPD
2021	Boris Weirauch	SPD

== Election results ==
=== 2026 election ===
State election (2026): Mannheim II
Notes:	Blue background denotes the winner of the electorate vote. Pink background denotes a candidate elected from their party list. Yellow background denotes an electorate win by a list member, or other incumbent. A ✓ or ✗ denotes status of any incumbent, win or lose respectively.						
Party	Candidate	Votes	%	±%	Party votes	%	±%
Greens	✓ Elke Zimmer	21,312	32.3	▼3.6	24,714	37.5	▲1.5
CDU	Sengül Engelhorn	15,741	23.9	▲7.2	14,544	22.0	▲5.3
SPD	Boris Weirauch	8,863	13.5	▼2.5	5,297	8.0	▼7.9
AfD	Rüdiger Ernst	8,554	13.0	▲5.0	8,478	12.8	▲4.9
Left	Isabell Fuhrmann	4,862	7.4	▲1.8	5,406	8.2	▲2.6
FDP	Kathrin Kölbl	2,976	4.5	▼4.8	2,908	4.4	▼4.9
Volt	Beate Betgen	1,243	1.9	▲0.5	935	1.4	Steady
FW	Thomas Rolke	1,238	1.9	▼0.5	832	1.3	▼1.1
BSW	Mato Oršolić	969	1.5		1,037	1.6	
APT					685	1.0	
PARTEI					399	0.6	▼1.2
dieBasis					131	0.2	▼0.6
Independent	Ayhan Sabah	122	0.2				
Team Todenhöfer					117	0.2	
Values					91	0.1	
Pensioners					81	0.1	
KlimalisteBW					74	0.1	▼1.4
ÖDP					67	0.1	▼0.2
PdF					56	0.1	
Bündnis C					52	0.1	
Humanists					42	0.1	
Verjüngungsforschung					38	0.1	
Informal votes		447			343		
Total valid votes		65,880			65,984		
Turnout		66,327	64.0	▲2.2			
Greens hold	Majority	5,571	8.4				

== See also ==
- Politics of Baden-Württemberg
- Landtag of Baden-Württemberg
