= Sigmaringen (electoral district) =

State electoral district of Germany

70: Sigmaringen
- Electoral district for the Landtag of Baden-Württemberg
- Sigmaringen in 2026
- District: Sigmaringen
- Electorate: 101,598 (2026)
- Major settlements: Entirety of the district of Sigmaringen

Current electoral district
- Party: CDU
- Member: Ilona Boos

Sigmaringen is an electoral constituency (German: Wahlkreis) represented in the Landtag of Baden-Württemberg. Since 2026, it has elected one member via first-past-the-post voting. Voters cast a second vote under which additional seats are allocated proportionally state-wide. Under the constituency numbering system, it is designated as constituency 70.

== Geography ==
The constituency incorporates the entirety of the district of Sigmaringen.

There were 101,598 eligible voters in 2026.

== Members ==
=== First mandate ===
Both prior to and since the electoral reforms for the 2026 election, the winner of the plurality of the vote (first-past-the-post) in every constituency won the first mandate.

Election	Member	Party	%
1976	Dietmar Schlee	CDU	
1980	Dietmar Schlee	CDU	
1984	Dietmar Schlee	CDU	
1988	Dietmar Schlee	CDU	
1992	Dietmar Schlee	CDU	
Nov 1994	Ernst Behringer	CDU	
1996	Ernst Behringer	CDU	
2001	Ernst Behringer	CDU	
2006	Ernst Behringer	CDU	53.8
2011	Tanja Gönner	CDU	50.2
Jul 2012	Klaus Burger	CDU	50.2
2016	Andrea Bogner-Unden	Grüne	33.7
2021	Andrea Bogner-Unden	Grüne	32.6
Jan 2025	Christoph Höh	Grüne	32.6
2026	Ilona Boos	CDU	43.1

=== Second mandate ===
Prior to the electoral reforms for the 2026 election, the seats in the state parliament were allocated proportionately amongst parties which received more than 5% of valid votes across the state. The seats that were won proportionally for parties that did not win as many first mandates as seats they were entitled to, were allocated to their candidates which received the highest proportion of the vote in their respective constituencies. This meant that following some elections, a constituency would have one or more members elected under a second mandate.

Prior to 2011, these second mandates were allocated to the party candidates who got the greatest number of votes, whilst from 2011-2021, these were allocated according to percentage share of the vote.

Prior to 2016, this constituency did not elect any members on a second mandate.

Election	Member	Party
2016	Klaus Burger	CDU
2021	Klaus Burger	CDU

== Election results ==
=== 2026 election ===
State election (2026)
Notes:	Blue background denotes the winner of the electorate vote. Pink background denotes a candidate elected from their party list. Yellow background denotes an electorate win by a list member, or other incumbent. A ✓ or ✗ denotes status of any incumbent, win or lose respectively.						
Party	Candidate	Votes	%	±%	Party votes	%	±%
CDU	Ilona Boos	29,183	43.1	▲15.3	24,830	36.5	▲8.7
AfD	Andreas Strobel	17,070	25.2	▲14.0	16,657	24.5	▲13.3
Greens	Hanna Stauß	11,849	17.5	▼15.1	15,061	22.2	▼10.4
FDP	Björn Brenner	2,946	4.3	▼7.8	2,716	4.0	▼8.1
SPD	Ramona Fuchs	2,903	4.3	▼2.0	2,477	3.6	▼2.6
Left	Michael Nill	1,991	2.9	▲0.5	1,898	2.8	▲0.4
FW					1,242	1.8	▼0.7
BSW	Brigitte Ehrich-Dornis	1,106	1.6		1,077	1.6	
APT					585	0.9	
Volt	Simon Oberdöffer	736	1.1		388	0.6	
PARTEI					230	0.3	▼1.1
Pensioners					149	0.2	
Values					129	0.2	
dieBasis					121	0.2	▼0.8
ÖDP					111	0.2	▼0.7
Bündnis C					104	0.2	
Verjüngungsforschung					51	0.1	
Team Todenhöfer					47	0.1	
PdF					46	0.1	
Humanists					33	0.0	
KlimalisteBW					24	0.0	▼0.5
Informal votes		759			567		
Total valid votes		67,784			67,976		
Turnout		68,543	70.0	▲6.7			
CDU gain from Greens	Majority	12,113	17.9				

== See also ==
- Politics of Baden-Württemberg
- Landtag of Baden-Württemberg
