= Heidelberg (Landtag electoral district) =

State electoral district of Germany

34: Heidelberg
- Electoral district for the Landtag of Baden-Württemberg
- Heidelberg in 2026
- District: Heidelberg
- Electorate: 100,964 (2026)
- Major settlements: Entirety of the urban district of Heidelberg

Current electoral district
- Party: Green
- Member: Florian Kollmann

Heidelberg is an electoral constituency (German: Wahlkreis) represented in the Landtag of Baden-Württemberg. Since 2026, it has elected one member via first-past-the-post voting. Voters cast a second vote under which additional seats are allocated proportionally state-wide. Under the constituency numbering system, it is designated as constituency 34.

== Geography ==
The constituency incorporates the entirety of the urban district of Heidelberg.

There were 100,964 eligible voters in 2026.

== Members ==
=== First mandate ===
Both prior to and since the electoral reforms for the 2026 election, the winner of the plurality of the vote (first-past-the-post) in every constituency won the first mandate.

Election	Member	Party	%
1976	Wilhelm Hahn	CDU	
1980	Karl Weber	CDU	
1984	Karl Weber	CDU	
1988	Karl Weber	CDU	
1992	Brigitte Unger-Soyka	SPD	
1996	Werner Pfisterer	CDU	
2001	Werner Pfisterer	CDU	37.0
2006	Werner Pfisterer	CDU	34.6
2011	Theresia Bauer	Grüne	28.0
2016	Theresia Bauer	Grüne	41.0
2021	Theresia Bauer	Grüne	41.7
Jun 2024	Marilena Geugjes	Grüne	41.7
2026	Florian Kollmann	Grüne	39.1

=== Second mandate ===
Prior to the electoral reforms for the 2026 election, the seats in the state parliament were allocated proportionately amongst parties which received more than 5% of valid votes across the state. The seats that were won proportionally for parties that did not win as many first mandates as seats they were entitled to, were allocated to their candidates which received the highest proportion of the vote in their respective constituencies. This meant that following some elections, a constituency would have one or more members elected under a second mandate.

Prior to 2011, these second mandates were allocated to the party candidates who got the greatest number of votes, whilst from 2011-2021, these were allocated according to percentage share of the vote.

Election	Member	Party	Member	Party
1976	Willi Edelhoff	SPD		
1980			Holger Heimann	Grüne
1984			Andreas von Bernstorff	Grüne
Jun 1986			Georg Habs-Hoffschrör	Grüne
1988	Brigitte Unger-Soyka	SPD	Reinhard Bütikofer	Grüne
1992			Reinhard Bütikofer	Grüne
1996			Dietrich Hildebrandt	Grüne
2001	Claus Wichmann	SPD	Theresia Bauer	Grüne
2006			Theresia Bauer	Grüne
2011				
2016
2021

== Election results ==
=== 2026 election ===
State election (2026): Heidelberg
Notes:	Blue background denotes the winner of the electorate vote. Pink background denotes a candidate elected from their party list. Yellow background denotes an electorate win by a list member, or other incumbent. A ✓ or ✗ denotes status of any incumbent, win or lose respectively.						
Party	Candidate	Votes	%	±%	Party votes	%	±%
Greens	Florian Kollmann	28,228	39.1	▼2.5	34,280	47.4	▲5.7
CDU	Nicole Huber	15,014	20.8	▲5.5	13,417	18.5	▲3.2
SPD	Ines Palm	9,356	13.0	▲0.3	4,325	6.0	▼6.7
Left	Kim Bohnen	7,594	10.5	▲2.1	7,319	10.1	▲1.7
AfD	Sven Geschinski	5,758	8.0	▲2.8	5,758	8.0	▲2.8
FDP	Tim Nusser	2,738	3.8	▼3.2	2,860	4.0	▼3.1
Volt	Elisa Hippert	2,331	3.2	▲1.0	1,448	2.0	▼0.2
BSW					858	1.2	
APT					491	0.7	
FW					457	0.6	▼0.8
PARTEI	Daniel Wagner	959	1.3	▼0.5	437	0.6	▼1.3
dieBasis					152	0.2	▼0.7
Independent	Sabine Regele	138	0.2				
ÖDP					79	0.1	▼0.5
Bündnis C					76	0.1	
Values					67	0.1	
Humanists					59	0.1	
KlimalisteBW					57	0.1	▼2.2
Pensioners					56	0.1	
PdF					51	0.1	
Team Todenhöfer					48	0.1	
Verjüngungsforschung					36	0.0	
Informal votes		434			219		
Total valid votes		72,116			72,331		
Turnout		72,550	71.9	▲4.6			
Greens hold	Majority	13,214	18.3				

== See also ==
- Politics of Baden-Württemberg
- Landtag of Baden-Württemberg
