= Rottweil (electoral district) =

State electoral district of Germany

53: Rottweil
- Electoral district for the Landtag of Baden-Württemberg
- Rottweil in 2026
- District: Rottweil
- Electorate: 102,830 (2026)
- Major settlements: Entirety of the district of Rottweil

Current electoral district
- Party: CDU
- Member: Stefan Teufel

Rottweil is an electoral constituency (German: Wahlkreis) represented in the Landtag of Baden-Württemberg. Since 2026, it has elected one member via first-past-the-post voting. Voters cast a second vote under which additional seats are allocated proportionally state-wide. Under the constituency numbering system, it is designated as constituency 53.

== Geography ==
The constituency incorporates the entirety of the district of Rottweil.

There were 102,830 eligible voters in 2026.

== Members ==
=== First mandate ===
Both prior to and since the electoral reforms for the 2026 election, the winner of the plurality of the vote (first-past-the-post) in every constituency won the first mandate.

Election	Member	Party	%
1976	Robert Gleichauf	CDU	
1980	Josef Rebhan	CDU	
1984	Josef Rebhan	CDU	
1988	Josef Rebhan	CDU	
1992	Josef Rebhan	CDU	
1996	Hans-Jochem Steim	CDU	
2001	Hans-Jochem Steim	CDU	52.1
2006	Stefan Teufel	CDU	48.4
2011	Stefan Teufel	CDU	45.9
2016	Stefan Teufel	CDU	33.0
2021	Stefan Teufel	CDU	26.7
2026	Stefan Teufel	CDU	37.7

=== Second mandate ===
Prior to the electoral reforms for the 2026 election, the seats in the state parliament were allocated proportionately amongst parties which received more than 5% of valid votes across the state. The seats that were won proportionally for parties that did not win as many first mandates as seats they were entitled to, were allocated to their candidates which received the highest proportion of the vote in their respective constituencies. This meant that following some elections, a constituency would have one or more members elected under a second mandate.

Prior to 2011, these second mandates were allocated to the party candidates who got the greatest number of votes, whilst from 2011-2021, these were allocated according to percentage share of the vote.

Election	Member	Party	Member	Party
1976	Erhard Eppler	SPD		
1980	Erhard Eppler	SPD		
Jul 1982	Klaus Haischer	SPD		
1984				
1988
1992	Liane Offermanns	REP		
1996	Christian Käs	REP	Dieter Kleinmann	FDP
2001			Dieter Kleinmann	FDP
2006			Dieter Kleinmann	FDP
2011				
2016	Emil Sänze	AfD	Gerhard Aden	FDP
Nov 2018	Emil Sänze	AfD	Daniel Karrais	FDP
2021	Emil Sänze	AfD	Daniel Karrais	FDP

== Election results ==
=== 2026 election ===
State election (2026): Rottweil
Notes:	Blue background denotes the winner of the electorate vote. Pink background denotes a candidate elected from their party list. Yellow background denotes an electorate win by a list member, or other incumbent. A ✓ or ✗ denotes status of any incumbent, win or lose respectively.						
Party	Candidate	Votes	%	±%	Party votes	%	±%
CDU	✓ Stefan Teufel	27,050	37.7	▲11.0	23,831	33.1	▲6.5
AfD	Emil Sänze	17,629	24.5	▲11.7	18,028	25.1	▲12.3
Greens	Artur Eichin	11,005	15.3	▼10.7	15,736	21.9	▼4.2
FDP	Daniel Karrais	6,150	8.6	▼7.7	3,772	5.2	▼11.0
SPD	Ali Zarabi	3,854	5.4	▼2.0	3,100	4.3	▼3.0
Left	Daniel Hettich	2,164	3.0	▲0.4	1,886	2.6	Steady
FW					1,379	1.9	▼0.9
BSW	Karl-Heinz Eith	1,338	1.9		1,184	1.6	
APT					702	1.0	
Volt	Marius Dettki	1,229	1.7		670	0.9	
ÖDP	Daniel Eggebrecht	630	0.9	▼1.1	326	0.5	▼1.5
Values	Matthias Schultz	449	0.6		333	0.5	
Bündnis C	Mike Kreigelstein	344	0.5		242	0.3	
PARTEI					194	0.3	
dieBasis					189	0.3	▼1.1
Pensioners					152	0.2	
Team Todenhöfer					67	0.1	
PdF					54	0.1	
Verjüngungsforschung					51	0.1	
Humanists					24	0.0	
KlimalisteBW					18	0.0	▼0.8
Informal votes		670			574		
Total valid votes		71,842			71,938		
Turnout		72,512	70.5	▲6.2			
CDU hold	Majority	9,421	13.2				

== See also ==
- Politics of Baden-Württemberg
- Landtag of Baden-Württemberg
