= Tuttlingen-Donaueschingen (electoral district) =

State electoral district of Germany

55: Tuttlingen-Donaueschingen
- Electoral district for the Landtag of Baden-Württemberg
- Tuttlingen-Donaueschingen in 2026
- District: Tuttlingen and Schwarzwald-Baar-Kreis
- Electorate: 125,352 (2026)
- Major settlements: Tuttlingen, Blumberg, Donaueschingen, and Hüfingen

Current electoral district
- Party: CDU
- Member: Guido Wolf

Tuttlingen-Donaueschingen is an electoral constituency (German: Wahlkreis) represented in the Landtag of Baden-Württemberg. Since 2026, it has elected one member via first-past-the-post voting. Voters cast a second vote under which additional seats are allocated proportionally state-wide. Under the constituency numbering system, it is designated as constituency 55. It is split between the entirety of the district of Tuttlingen and part of the district of Schwarzwald-Baar-Kreis.

== Geography ==
The constituency includes the entirety of the district of Tuttlingen, and the municipalities of Blumberg, Donaueschingen, and Hüfingen from the district of Schwarzwald-Baar-Kreis.

There were 125,352 eligible voters in 2026.

== Members ==
=== First mandate ===
Both prior to and since the electoral reforms for the 2026 election, the winner of the plurality of the vote (first-past-the-post) in every constituency won the first mandate.

Election	Member	Party	%
1976	Wilhelm Buggle	CDU	
1980	Wilhelm Buggle	CDU	
1984	Roland Ströbele	CDU	
1988	Roland Ströbele	CDU	
1992	Roland Ströbele	CDU	
1996	Franz Schuhmacher	CDU	
2001	Franz Schuhmacher	CDU	53.3
2006	Guido Wolf	CDU	46.0
2011	Guido Wolf	CDU	46.3
2016	Guido Wolf	CDU	33.7
2021	Guido Wolf	CDU	29.3
2026	Guido Wolf	CDU	38.6

=== Second mandate ===
Prior to the electoral reforms for the 2026 election, the seats in the state parliament were allocated proportionately amongst parties which received more than 5% of valid votes across the state. The seats that were won proportionally for parties that did not win as many first mandates as seats they were entitled to, were allocated to their candidates which received the highest proportion of the vote in their respective constituencies. This meant that following some elections, a constituency would have one or more members elected under a second mandate.

Prior to 2011, these second mandates were allocated to the party candidates who got the greatest number of votes, whilst from 2011-2021, these were allocated according to percentage share of the vote.

Election	Member	Party	Member	Party	Member	Party
1976	Herbert Moser	SPD				
1980	Herbert Moser	SPD	Ernst Pfister	FDP		
1984	Herbert Moser	SPD	Ernst Pfister	FDP		
1988	Herbert Moser	SPD	Ernst Pfister	FDP		
1992			Ernst Pfister	FDP		
1996	Herbert Moser	SPD	Ernst Pfister	FDP	Eduard Hauser	REP
2001	Herbert Moser	SPD	Ernst Pfister	FDP		
2006	Fritz Buschle	SPD	Ernst Pfister	FDP		
2011			Leopold Grimm	FDP		
Aug 2014			Niko Reith	FDP		
2016	Lars Patrick Berg	AfD				
Jul 2019	Doris Senger	AfD				
Jan 2021	Doris Senger	Ind				
2021	Rüdiger Klos	AfD	Niko Reith	FDP		

== Election results ==
=== 2026 election ===
State election (2026): Tuttlingen-Donaueschingen
Notes:	Blue background denotes the winner of the electorate vote. Pink background denotes a candidate elected from their party list. Yellow background denotes an electorate win by a list member, or other incumbent. A ✓ or ✗ denotes status of any incumbent, win or lose respectively.						
Party	Candidate	Votes	%	±%	Party votes	%	±%
CDU	✓ Guido Wolf	31,667	38.6	▲9.3	27,597	33.5	▲4.2
AfD	Kay Rittweg	21,630	26.3	▲13.5	21,983	26.7	▲13.8
Greens	Jens Metzger	14,494	17.7	▼10.5	17,145	20.8	▼7.3
FDP	Nikolai Reith	6,563	8.0	▼5.4	4,486	5.4	▼8.0
SPD	Christine Treublut	3,833	4.7	▼2.2	3,262	4.0	▼2.9
Left	Alexandra Hermann	2,565	3.1	▲0.6	2,308	2.8	▲0.2
FW					1,392	1.7	▼0.9
BSW					1,240	1.5	
APT					787	1.0	
Volt	Christiane Fichter	1,340	1.6	▲1.0	637	0.8	▲0.2
PARTEI					302	0.4	
dieBasis					257	0.3	▼0.7
Values					192	0.2	
Bündnis C					189	0.2	
Pensioners					184	0.2	
ÖDP					126	0.2	▼0.7
Team Todenhöfer					110	0.1	
Verjüngungsforschung					62	0.1	
PdF					57	0.1	
Humanists					28	0.0	
KlimalisteBW					18	0.0	▼0.7
Informal votes		907			637		
Total valid votes		82,092			92,362		
Turnout		82,999	66.2	▲6.0			
CDU hold	Majority	10,037	12.3				

== See also ==
- Politics of Baden-Württemberg
- Landtag of Baden-Württemberg
