= Neckar-Odenwald (electoral district) =

State electoral district of Germany

38: Neckar-Odenwald
- Electoral district for the Landtag of Baden-Württemberg
- Neckar-Odenwald in 2026
- District: Neckar-Odenwald-Kreis
- Electorate: 108,571 (2026)
- Major settlements: Entirety of the district of Neckar-Odenwald-Kreis

Current electoral district
- Party: CDU
- Member: Peter Hauk

Neckar-Odenwald is an electoral constituency (German: Wahlkreis) represented in the Landtag of Baden-Württemberg. Since 2026, it has elected one member via first-past-the-post voting. Voters cast a second vote under which additional seats are allocated proportionally state-wide. Under the constituency numbering system, it is designated as constituency 38.

== Geography ==
The constituency incorporates the entirety of the district of Neckar-Odenwald-Kreis.

There were 108,571 eligible voters in 2026.

== Members ==
=== First mandate ===
Both prior to and since the electoral reforms for the 2026 election, the winner of the plurality of the vote (first-past-the-post) in every constituency won the first mandate.

Election	Member	Party	%
1976	Hans Heidler	CDU	
May 1978	Manfred Pfaus	CDU	
1980	Manfred Pfaus	CDU	
1984	Manfred Pfaus	CDU	
1988	Manfred Pfaus	CDU	
1992	Peter Hauk	CDU	
1996	Peter Hauk	CDU	
2001	Peter Hauk	CDU	54.2
2006	Peter Hauk	CDU	53.7
2011	Peter Hauk	CDU	48.4
2016	Peter Hauk	CDU	34.2
2021	Peter Hauk	CDU	31.6
2026	Peter Hauk	CDU	39.2

=== Second mandate ===
Prior to the electoral reforms for the 2026 election, the seats in the state parliament were allocated proportionately amongst parties which received more than 5% of valid votes across the state. The seats that were won proportionally for parties that did not win as many first mandates as seats they were entitled to, were allocated to their candidates which received the highest proportion of the vote in their respective constituencies. This meant that following some elections, a constituency would have one or more members elected under a second mandate.

Prior to 2011, these second mandates were allocated to the party candidates who got the greatest number of votes, whilst from 2011-2021, these were allocated according to percentage share of the vote.

Prior to 1984, this constituency did not elect any members on a second mandate.

Election	Member	Party	Member	Party
1984	Gerd Teßmer	SPD		
1988	Gerd Teßmer	SPD		
1992	Gerd Teßmer	SPD		
1996	Gerd Teßmer	SPD		
2001	Gerd Teßmer	SPD		
2006	Karl-Heinz Joseph	SPD		
May 2007	Georg Nelius	SPD		
2011	Georg Nelius	SPD		
2016	Georg Nelius	SPD		
Jul 2020	Georg Nelius	SPD	Uwe Wanke	AfD
2021

== Election results ==
=== 2026 election ===
State election (2026): Neckar-Odenwald
Notes:	Blue background denotes the winner of the electorate vote. Pink background denotes a candidate elected from their party list. Yellow background denotes an electorate win by a list member, or other incumbent. A ✓ or ✗ denotes status of any incumbent, win or lose respectively.						
Party	Candidate	Votes	%	±%	Party votes	%	±%
CDU	✓ Peter Hauk	28,803	39.2	▲7.6	24,709	33.6	▲2.0
AfD	Lukas Huber	17,724	24.1	▲11.8	18,212	24.8	▲12.4
Greens	Arno Meuter	10,109	13.8	▼9.9	15,049	20.5	▼3.2
SPD	Patrick Haag	8,973	12.2	▲0.1	5,487	7.5	▼4.7
FW	Eberhard Leutz	2,904	4.0	Steady	2,242	3.0	▼0.9
Left	Jeffry Gorecki	2,384	3.2	▲0.9	2,195	3.0	▲0.6
FDP	Christian Ritter	1,953	2.7	▼5.3	2,360	3.2	▼4.7
BSW					961	1.3	
APT					745	1.0	
Volt					326	0.4	▼0.2
PARTEI					274	0.4	
ÖDP	Claudia Assimus	585	0.8	▼0.2	183	0.2	▼0.8
dieBasis					183	0.2	
Values					149	0.2	
Bündnis C					133	0.2	
Pensioners					131	0.2	
Team Todenhöfer					63	0.1	
Verjüngungsforschung					47	0.1	
PdF					45	0.1	
KlimalisteBW					28	0.0	▼0.6
Humanists					25	0.0	
Informal votes		739			627		
Total valid votes		73,435			73,547		
Turnout		74,174	68.3	▲6.2			
CDU hold	Majority	11,079	15.1				

== See also ==
- Politics of Baden-Württemberg
- Landtag of Baden-Württemberg
