= Emmendingen (electoral district) =

State electoral district of Germany

49: Emmendingen
- Electoral district for the Landtag of Baden-Württemberg
- Emmendingen in 2026
- District: Emmendingen
- Electorate: 126,470 (2026)
- Major settlements: Entirety of the district of Emmendingen

Current electoral district
- Party: CDU
- Member: Stefanie Wernet

Emmendingen is an electoral constituency (German: Wahlkreis) represented in the Landtag of Baden-Württemberg. Since 2026, it has elected one member via first-past-the-post voting. Voters cast a second vote under which additional seats are allocated proportionally state-wide. Under the constituency numbering system, it is designated as constituency 49.

== Geography ==
The constituency incorporates the entirety of the district of Emmendingen.

There were 126,470 eligible voters in 2026.

== Members ==
=== First mandate ===
Both prior to and since the electoral reforms for the 2026 election, the winner of the plurality of the vote (first-past-the-post) in every constituency won the first mandate.

Election	Member	Party	%
1976	Alois Schätzle	CDU	
1980	Alois Schätzle	CDU	
1984	Alois Schätzle	CDU	
1988	Alfred Haas	CDU	
1992	Alfred Haas	CDU	
1996	Alfred Haas	CDU	
2001	Alfred Haas	CDU	44.0
2006	Marcel Schwehr	CDU	39.4
2011	Marcel Schwehr	CDU	32.4
2016	Alexander Schoch	Grüne	35.5
2021	Alexander Schoch	Grüne	36.2
Apr 2025	Rüdiger Tonojan	Grüne	36.2
2026	Stefanie Wernet	CDU	33.9

=== Second mandate ===
Prior to the electoral reforms for the 2026 election, the seats in the state parliament were allocated proportionately amongst parties which received more than 5% of valid votes across the state. The seats that were won proportionally for parties that did not win as many first mandates as seats they were entitled to, were allocated to their candidates which received the highest proportion of the vote in their respective constituencies. This meant that following some elections, a constituency would have one or more members elected under a second mandate.

Prior to 2011, these second mandates were allocated to the party candidates who got the greatest number of votes, whilst from 2011-2021, these were allocated according to percentage share of the vote.

Election	Member	Party	Member	Party
1976	Karl Nicola	SPD	Hans Erich Schött	FDP
1980	Karl Nicola	SPD	Hans Erich Schött	FDP
1984	Karl Nicola	SPD		
1988	Karl Nicola	SPD		
1992	Marianne Wonnay	SPD		
1996	Marianne Wonnay	SPD		
2001	Marianne Wonnay	SPD		
2006	Marianne Wonnay	SPD	Dieter Ehret	FDP
2011	Sabine Wölfle	SPD	Alexander Schoch	Grüne
2016	Sabine Wölfle	SPD		
2021				

== Election results ==
=== 2026 election ===
State election (2026): Emmendingen
Notes:	Blue background denotes the winner of the electorate vote. Pink background denotes a candidate elected from their party list. Yellow background denotes an electorate win by a list member, or other incumbent. A ✓ or ✗ denotes status of any incumbent, win or lose respectively.						
Party	Candidate	Votes	%	±%	Party votes	%	±%
CDU	Stefanie Wernet	30,560	33.9	▲12.0	25,931	28.7	▲6.9
Greens	✗ Rüdiger Tonojan	23,816	26.4	▼9.8	29,759	32.9	▼3.3
AfD	Rolf Heckmann	14,180	15.7	▲8.6	14,209	15.7	▲8.6
SPD	Martina Fuhrmann	8,335	9.2	▼2.3	6,257	6.9	▼4.6
Left	Michaela Rotermund-Kaplan	4,223	4.7	▲1.3	3,896	4.3	▲0.9
FW	Christina Hesse	3,822	4.2	▲0.5	2,568	2.8	▼0.9
FDP	Matthias Mand	3,234	3.6	▼6.5	3,215	3.6	▼6.6
BSW					1,052	1.2	
APT					1,038	1.1	
Volt	Lukas Burger	1,054	1.2	▲0.7	700	0.8	▲0.3
PARTEI	Dirk Ruppenthal	988	1.1	▼0.7	500	0.6	▼1.3
dieBasis					317	0.4	
ÖDP					201	0.2	▼1.2
Pensioners					147	0.2	
Values					143	0.2	
Bündnis C					138	0.2	
Team Todenhöfer					81	0.1	
PdF					79	0.1	
Verjüngungsforschung					68	0.1	
Humanists					37	0.0	
KlimalisteBW					34	0.0	▼1.1
Informal votes		687			529		
Total valid votes		90,212			90,370		
Turnout		90,899	71.9	▲6.9			
CDU gain from Greens	Majority	6,744	7.5				

== See also ==
- Politics of Baden-Württemberg
- Landtag of Baden-Württemberg
