= Offenburg (Landtag electoral district) =

State electoral district of Germany

51: Offenburg
- Electoral district for the Landtag of Baden-Württemberg
- Offenburg in 2026
- District: Ortenaukreis
- Electorate: 100,718 (2026)
- Major settlements: Bad Peterstal-Griesbach, Berghaupten, Biberach, Durbach, Gengenbach, Hohberg, Neuried, Nordrach, Oberharmersbach, Offenburg, Ohlsbach, Oppenau, Ortenberg, Schutterwald, and Zell am Harmersbach

Current electoral district
- Party: CDU
- Member: Volker Schebesta

Offenburg is an electoral constituency (German: Wahlkreis) represented in the Landtag of Baden-Württemberg.

Since 2026, it has elected one member via first-past-the-post voting. Voters cast a second vote under which additional seats are allocated proportionally state-wide. Under the constituency numbering system, it is designated as constituency 51.

It is wholly within the district of Ortenaukreis.

== Geography ==
The constituency includes the municipalities of Bad Peterstal-Griesbach, Berghaupten, Biberach, Durbach, Gengenbach, Hohberg, Neuried, Nordrach, Oberharmersbach, Offenburg, Ohlsbach, Oppenau, Ortenberg, Schutterwald, and Zell am Harmersbach, within the district of Ortenaukreis.

There were 100,718 eligible voters in 2026.

== Members ==
=== First mandate ===
Both prior to and since the electoral reforms for the 2026 election, the winner of the plurality of the vote (first-past-the-post) in every constituency won the first mandate.

Election	Member	Party	%
1976	Robert Ruder	CDU	
1980	Robert Ruder	CDU	
1984	Robert Ruder	CDU	
1988	Robert Ruder	CDU	
1992	Robert Ruder	CDU	
1996	Robert Ruder	CDU	
2001	Volker Schebesta	CDU	50.0
2006	Volker Schebesta	CDU	50.5
2011	Volker Schebesta	CDU	41.5
2016	Thomas Marwein	Grüne	33.7
2021	Thomas Marwein	Grüne	36.8
2026	Volker Schebesta	CDU	39.0

=== Second mandate ===
Prior to the electoral reforms for the 2026 election, the seats in the state parliament were allocated proportionately amongst parties which received more than 5% of valid votes across the state. The seats that were won proportionally for parties that did not win as many first mandates as seats they were entitled to, were allocated to their candidates which received the highest proportion of the vote in their respective constituencies. This meant that following some elections, a constituency would have one or more members elected under a second mandate.

Prior to 2011, these second mandates were allocated to the party candidates who got the greatest number of votes, whilst from 2011-2021, these were allocated according to percentage share of the vote.

Prior to 2011, this constituency did not elect any members on a second mandate.

Election	Member	Party
2011	Thomas Marwein	Grüne
2016	Volker Schebesta	CDU
2021	Volker Schebesta	CDU

== Election results ==
=== 2026 election ===
State election (2026): Offenburg
Notes:	Blue background denotes the winner of the electorate vote. Pink background denotes a candidate elected from their party list. Yellow background denotes an electorate win by a list member, or other incumbent. A ✓ or ✗ denotes status of any incumbent, win or lose respectively.						
Party	Candidate	Votes	%	±%	Party votes	%	±%
CDU	Volker Schebesta	26,432	39.0	▲13.6	21,449	31.4	▲6.0
Greens	Maren Seifert	16,161	23.8	▼12.9	19,228	28.2	▼8.6
AfD	Taras Maygutiak	12,846	18.9	▲10.6	12,914	18.9	▲10.6
SPD	Richard Groß	5,571	8.2	▼0.4	3,932	5.8	▼2.9
Left	Amelie Vollmer	3,629	5.4	▲2.4	2,666	3.9	▲1.0
FDP	Ann-Kathrin Stulz	3,154	4.7	▼4.3	2,646	3.9	▼5.0
FW					1,888	2.8	Steady
BSW					1,022	1.5	
APT					832	1.2	
Volt					428	0.6	
PARTEI					256	0.4	▼1.5
dieBasis					246	0.4	▼2.0
Values					170	0.2	
Pensioners					115	0.2	
Bündnis C					97	0.1	
ÖDP					91	0.1	▼0.5
Team Todenhöfer					78	0.1	
Verjüngungsforschung					51	0.1	
PdF					47	0.1	
KlimalisteBW					29	0.0	▼0.6
Humanists					17	0.0	
Informal votes		906			497		
Total valid votes		67,793			68,202		
Turnout		68,699	68.2	▲6.4			
CDU gain from Greens	Majority	10,271	15.2				

== See also ==
- Politics of Baden-Württemberg
- Landtag of Baden-Württemberg
