= Calw (Landtag electoral district) =

State electoral district of Germany

43: Calw
- Electoral district for the Landtag of Baden-Württemberg
- Calw in 2026
- District: Calw
- Electorate: 113,380 (2026)
- Major settlements: Calw

Current electoral district
- Party: CDU
- Member: Carl Christian Hirsch

Calw is an electoral constituency (German: Wahlkreis) represented in the Landtag of Baden-Württemberg. Since 2026, it has elected one member via first-past-the-post voting. Voters cast a second vote under which additional seats are allocated proportionally state-wide. Under the constituency numbering system, it is designated as constituency 43. It incorporates the entirety of the district of Calw.

== Geography ==
The constituency comprises the entirety of the district of Calw.

There were 113,380 eligible voters in 2026.

== Members ==
=== First mandate ===
Both prior to and since the electoral reforms for the 2026 election, the winner of the plurality of the vote (first-past-the-post) in every constituency won the first mandate.

Election	Member	Party	%
1976	Hermann Dutt	CDU	
Jun 1977	Arnold Tölg	CDU	
1980	Arnold Tölg	CDU	
1984	Arnold Tölg	CDU	
1988	Arnold Tölg	CDU	
1992	Arnold Tölg	CDU	
1996	Arnold Tölg	CDU	
2001	Thomas Blenke	CDU	46.3
2006	Thomas Blenke	CDU	44.2
2011	Thomas Blenke	CDU	44.0
2016	Thomas Blenke	CDU	31.5
2021	Thomas Blenke	CDU	28.8
2026	Carl-Christian Hirsch	CDU	37.6

=== Second mandate ===
Prior to the electoral reforms for the 2026 election, the seats in the state parliament were allocated proportionately amongst parties which received more than 5% of valid votes across the state. The seats that were won proportionally for parties that did not win as many first mandates as seats they were entitled to, were allocated to their candidates which received the highest proportion of the vote in their respective constituencies. This meant that following some elections, a constituency would have one or more members elected under a second mandate.

Prior to 2011, these second mandates were allocated to the party candidates who got the greatest number of votes, whilst from 2011-2021, these were allocated according to percentage share of the vote.

Prior to 1992, this constituency did not elect any members on a second mandate.

Election	Member	Party	Member	Party
1992	Lothar König	REP		
1996	Lothar König	REP	Beate Fauser	FDP
2001			Beate Fauser	FDP
2006	Rainer Prewo	SPD	Beate Fauser	FDP
2011				
2016	Heinrich Kuhm	AfD		
Jan 2017	Klaus Dürr	AfD		
Jun 2020				
2021	Miguel Klauß	AfD		

== Election results ==
=== 2026 election ===
State election (2026): Calw
Notes:	Blue background denotes the winner of the electorate vote. Pink background denotes a candidate elected from their party list. Yellow background denotes an electorate win by a list member, or other incumbent. A ✓ or ✗ denotes status of any incumbent, win or lose respectively.						
Party	Candidate	Votes	%	±%	Party votes	%	±%
CDU	Carl Christian Hirsch	29,625	37.6	▲8.8	25,357	32.0	▲3.2
AfD	Miguel Klauß	19,946	25.3	▲11.8	20,013	25.3	▲11.8
Greens	Fynn Rubehn	12,842	16.3	▼10.8	18,484	23.3	▼3.8
SPD	Daniela Steinrode	7,755	9.8	▲2.1	3,881	4.9	▼2.9
FDP	Johannes Feldmann	3,966	5.0	▼5.0	3,524	4.4	▼5.6
Left	Thomas Hanser	2,890	3.7	▲1.0	2,263	2.9	▲0.1
FW					1,374	1.7	▼4.4
BSW					1,012	1.3	
Bündnis C	Markus Bender	1,365	1.7		896	1.1	
APT					787	1.0	
Volt					401	0.5	
PARTEI					282	0.4	
Values	Stephan Schaible	430	0.5		274	0.3	
dieBasis					171	0.2	▼0.8
ÖDP					133	0.2	▼0.9
Pensioners					133	0.2	
Team Todenhöfer					96	0.1	
Verjüngungsforschung					53	0.1	
Humanists					33	0.0	
PdF					31	0.0	
KlimalisteBW					28	0.0	▼0.7
Informal votes		869			462		
Total valid votes		78,819			79,226		
Turnout		79,688	70.3	▲6.6			
CDU hold	Majority	9,679	12.3				

== See also ==
- Politics of Baden-Württemberg
- Landtag of Baden-Württemberg
