= Elections in Baden-Württemberg =

== Result summary ==
Year	Eligible to vote	Turn-out	CDU	SPD	FDP/DVP	BHE	KPD/DKP	NPD	Greens	REP	WASG/The Left	AfD	others
1952	4,382,100	63.7%	36.0%	28.0%	18.0%	6.3%	4.4%	-	-	-	-	-	
1956	4,738,400	70.3%	42.6%	28.9%	16.6%	6.3%	3.2%	-	-	-	-	-	2.4%
1960	5,136,000	59.0%	39.5%	35.3%	15.8%	6.6%	-	-	-	-	-	-	2.8%
1964	5,471,000	67.7%	46.2%	37.3%	13.1%	-	-	-	-	-	-	-	3.4%
1968	5,612,200	70.7%	44.2%	29.0%	14.4%	-	-	9.8%	-	-	-	-	2.6%
1972	5,998,700	80.0%	52.9%	37.6%	8.9%	-	0.5%	-	-	-	-	-	0.1%
1976	6,092,500	75.5%	56.7%	33.3%	7.8%	-	0.4%	0.9%	-	-	-	-	0.9%
1980	6,320,000	72.0%	53.4%	32.5%	8.3%	-	0.2%	-	5.3%	-	-	-	0.3%
1984	6,609,200	71.2%	51.9%	32.4%	7.2%	-	0.3%	-	8.0%	-	-	-	0.2%
1988	6,872,300	71.8%	49.0%	32.0%	5.9%	-	0.2%	2.1%	7.9%	1.0%	-	-	1.9%
1992	7,154,600	70.1%	39.6%	29.4%	5.9%	-	-	-	9.5%	10.9%	-	-	4.8%
1996	7,189,900	67.6%	41.3%	25.1%	9.6%	-	-	-	12.1%	9.1%	-	-	2.8%
2001	7,313,800	62.6%	44.8%	33.3%	8.1%	-	-	-	7.7%	4.4%	-	-	1.7%
2006	7,516,900	53.4%	44.2%	25.2%	10.7%	-	-	-	11.7%	-	3.1%	-	2.6%
2011	7,623,000	66.2%	39%	23.1%	5.3%	-	-	-	24.1%	1.1%	2.8%	-	4.5%
2016	7,685,778	70.4%	27.0%	12.7%	8.3%	-	-	-	30.3%	-	2.9%	15.1%	2.5%
2021	7,669,608	63.8%	24.1%	11.0%	10.5%	-	-	-	32.6%	-	3.6%	9.7%	8.5%
2026

== Sources ==
- Uwe Andersen, Wichard Woyke (Eds.) (1997): Handwörterbuch des politischen Systems der Bundesrepublik Deutschland. ISBN 3-89331-301-X, p. 654 (Appendix A, Table 10).
- Statistisches Landesamt Baden-Württemberg (2011): Wahl zum 15. Landtag von Baden-Württemberg am 27. März 2011. Vorläufige Ergebnisse. Reihe Statistische Analysen, 1/2011.

== See also ==
- Politics of Baden-Württemberg
