= Freudenstadt (electoral district) =

State electoral district of Germany

45: Freudenstadt
- Electoral district for the Landtag of Baden-Württemberg
- Freudenstadt in 2026
- District: Freudenstadt
- Electorate: 87,214 (2026)
- Major settlements: Entirety of the district of Freudenstadt

Current electoral district
- Party: CDU
- Member: Katrin Schindele

Freudenstadt is an electoral constituency (German: Wahlkreis) represented in the Landtag of Baden-Württemberg. Since 2026, it has elected one member via first-past-the-post voting. Voters cast a second vote under which additional seats are allocated proportionally state-wide. Under the constituency numbering system, it is designated as constituency 45.

== Geography ==
The constituency incorporates the entirety of the district of Freudenstadt.

There were 87,214 eligible voters in 2026.

== Members ==
=== First mandate ===
Both prior to and since the electoral reforms for the 2026 election, the winner of the plurality of the vote (first-past-the-post) in every constituency won the first mandate.

Election	Member	Party	%
1976	Norbert Schneider	CDU	
1980	Norbert Schneider	CDU	
1984	Norbert Schneider	CDU	
1988	Norbert Schneider	CDU	
1992	Norbert Schneider	CDU	
1996	Carmina Brenner	CDU	
2001	Carmina Brenner	CDU	50.4
2006	Carmina Brenner	CDU	44.6
Sep 2007	Norbert Beck	CDU	44.6
2011	Norbert Beck	CDU	45.8
2016	Norbert Beck	CDU	30.3
2021	Katrin Schindele	CDU	27.3
2026	Katrin Schindele	CDU	41.5

=== Second mandate ===
Prior to the electoral reforms for the 2026 election, the seats in the state parliament were allocated proportionately amongst parties which received more than 5% of valid votes across the state. The seats that were won proportionally for parties that did not win as many first mandates as seats they were entitled to, were allocated to their candidates which received the highest proportion of the vote in their respective constituencies. This meant that following some elections, a constituency would have one or more members elected under a second mandate.

Prior to 2011, these second mandates were allocated to the party candidates who got the greatest number of votes, whilst from 2011-2021, these were allocated according to percentage share of the vote.

Prior to 2001, this constituency did not elect any members on a second mandate.

Election	Member	Party	Member	Party
2001	Michael Theurer	FDP		
2006	Michael Theurer	FDP		
Aug 2009				
2011	Timm Kern	FDP		
2016	Timm Kern	FDP		
2021	Timm Kern	FDP	Uwe Hellstern	AfD

== Election results ==
=== 2026 election ===
State election (2026): Freudenstadt
Notes:	Blue background denotes the winner of the electorate vote. Pink background denotes a candidate elected from their party list. Yellow background denotes an electorate win by a list member, or other incumbent. A ✓ or ✗ denotes status of any incumbent, win or lose respectively.						
Party	Candidate	Votes	%	±%	Party votes	%	±%
CDU	✓ Katrin Schindele	25,077	41.5	▲14.3	20,678	34.1	▲6.9
AfD	Andreas Grammel	15,198	25.2	▲12.0	15,248	25.2	▲12.0
Greens	Daniel Belling	9,815	16.2	▼8.5	13,332	22.0	▼2.7
SPD	Betins Ahrens-Diez	3,677	6.1	▼2.3	2,673	4.4	▼4.0
FDP	Veit Grünberg	2,660	4.4	▼10.4	2,694	4.4	▼10.4
Left	Yannic Walheim	2,009	3.3	▲1.1	1,684	2.8	▲0.6
BSW	Sabine Frank	1,126	1.9		978	1.6	
FW					934	1.5	▼3.0
Bündnis C	Walter Schäuffele	852	1.4	▲0.3	626	1.0	▼0.1
APT					568	0.9	
Volt					332	0.5	
Values					169	0.3	
PARTEI					163	0.3	
dieBasis					127	0.2	▼0.9
Pensioners					107	0.2	
ÖDP					102	0.2	▼0.7
Team Todenhöfer					73	0.1	
Verjüngungsforschung					31	0.1	
PdF					28	0.0	
KlimalisteBW					23	0.0	▼0.8
Humanists					17	0.0	
Informal votes		499			326		
Total valid votes		60,414			60,587		
Turnout		60,913	69.8	▲7.7			
CDU hold	Majority	9,879	16.3				

== See also ==
- Politics of Baden-Württemberg
- Landtag of Baden-Württemberg
