= Arne Gericke =

German politician

Arne Gericke MEP

Member of the European Parliament
- In office 1 July 2014 – 1 July 2019
- Constituency: Germany

Personal details
- Born: 19 November 1964 (age 61) Hamburg, Germany
- Party: Germany; Bündnis C (2018–present); Free Voters (2017–2018); Family Party of Germany (2005–2017); European Union; EU Parliamentary group: European Conservatives and Reformists Group
- Spouse: Susanne Gericke
- Children: 7

Arne Gericke (born 19 November 1964 in Hamburg) is a German politician who was formerly a Member of the European Parliament. Elected for the Family Party of Germany in the 2014 election, he left in 2017 to join the Free Voters. After 15 months with the Free Voters, he left to join the minor conservative Christian party Bündnis C.

At the European level, while he was a member of the Free voters he was also technically a member of the European Democratic Party, however he has always remained affiliated with the European Christian Political Movement and sat with the European Conservatives and Reformists (ECR) group in the European Parliament.

He lost his seat in the 2019 European Parliament election after Bündnis C failed to win enough votes to entitle them to a seat.

In 2012 Gericke was awarded the Mestemacher Bakery prize for Father of the Year, given to men who are model fathers.
