= Politics of Baden-Württemberg =

Overview of the politics of the German state of Baden-Württemberg

The politics of Baden-Württemberg takes place within a framework of a federal parliamentary representative democratic republic, where the Federal Government of Germany exercises sovereign rights with certain powers reserved to the states of Germany including Baden-Württemberg. Since 1948 politics in the state has been dominated by the centre-right Christian Democratic Union (CDU). However, in the 2011 election the CDU lost its majority in the Landtag of Baden-Württemberg and since various coalitions were formed by the Green leader Winfried Kretschmann.

== History pre-1952 ==
The minister-presidents of Baden-Württemberg's predecessor states were:

State	Period	Minister-president	Party
Württemberg-Hohenzollern	1945–47	Carlo Schmid	SPD
Württemberg-Hohenzollern	1947–48	Lorenz Bock	CDU
Württemberg-Hohenzollern	1948–52	Gebhard Müller	CDU
Württemberg-Baden	1946–52	Reinhold Maier	DVP, then FDP
South Baden	1946–52	Leo Wohleb	CDU

Prior to the Second World War and the regime of Nazi Germany from 1933, the largest party in both the Republic of Baden and the Free People's State of Württemberg was the Catholic Centre Party.

The leaders of the government of the Republic of Baden:

Period	Minister-president	Party
1918–20	Anton Geiß	SPD
1920–21	Gustav Trunk	Centre
1921–22	Hermann Hummel	DDP
1922–23	Adam Remmele	SPD
1923–24	Heinrich Franz Köhler	Centre
1924–25	Willy Hellpach	DDP
1925–26	Gustav Trunk	Centre
1926–27	Heinrich Franz Köhler	Centre
Feb 1927 – Nov 1927	Gustav Trunk	Centre
Nov 1927 – 1928	Adam Remmele	SPD
1928–30	Josef Schmitt	Centre
1930–31	Franz Josef Wittemann	Centre
1931–33	Josef Schmitt	Centre

The leaders of the government of Württemberg 1918 – 1933:

== Minister-presidents since 1952 ==
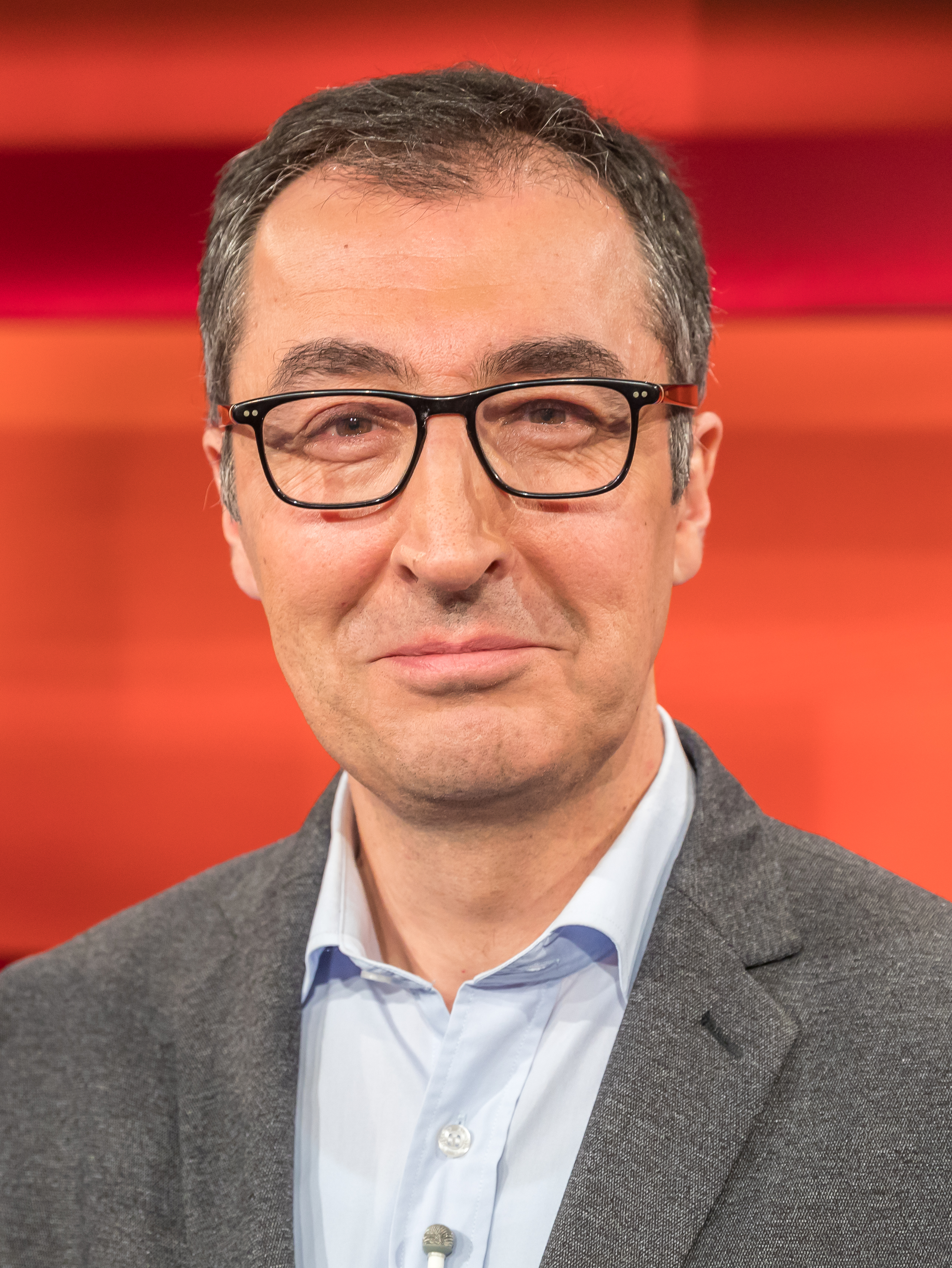
Cem Özdemir, incumbent minister-president

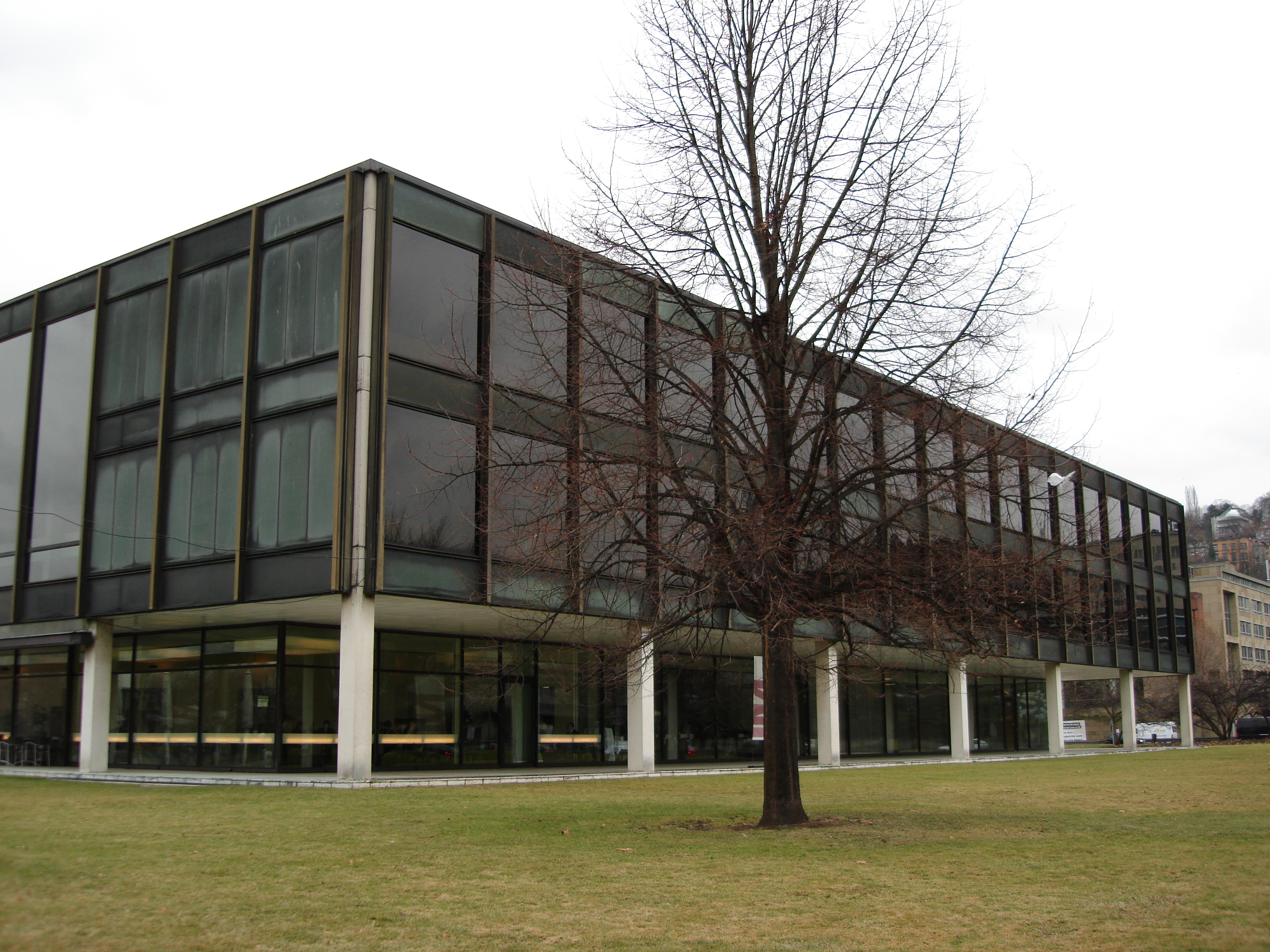
The Baden-Württemberg state parliament building

Since the creation of the state in 1952, the state's minister-presidents have been:

Period	Minister-president	Party	Coalition
1952–53	Reinhold Maier	FDP	FDP–SPD
1953–58	Gebhard Müller	CDU	CDU–SPD–FDP
1958–60	Kurt Georg Kiesinger	CDU	CDU–SPD–FDP
1960–66	Kurt Georg Kiesinger	CDU	CDU–FDP
1966–72	Hans Filbinger	CDU	CDU–SPD
1972–78	Hans Filbinger	CDU	CDU
1978–91	Lothar Späth	CDU	CDU
1991–92	Erwin Teufel	CDU	CDU
1992–96	Erwin Teufel	CDU	CDU–SPD
1996–05	Erwin Teufel	CDU	CDU–FDP
2005–10	Günther Oettinger	CDU	CDU–FDP
2010–11	Stefan Mappus	CDU	CDU–FDP
2011–16	Winfried Kretschmann	Greens	Greens–SPD
2016–21	Winfried Kretschmann	Greens	Greens–CDU
2021–2026	Winfried Kretschmann	Greens	Greens–CDU
2026–present	Cem Özdemir	Greens	Greens-CDU

== Landtag of Baden-Württemberg ==
=== Party strength in the Landtag ===
Election year	Total seats	Seats won								
Election year	Total seats	CDU	SPD	FDP	BHE	Grüne	REP	AfD	KPD	NPD
1952	121	50	38	23	6				4	
1956	120	56	36	21	7					
1960	121	52	44	18	7					
1964	120	59	47	14						
1968	127	60	37	18						12
1972	120	65	45	10						
1976	121	71	41	9						
1980	124	68	40	10		6				
1984	126	68	41	8		9				
1988	125	66	42	7		10				
1992	146	64	46	8		13	15			
1996	155	69	39	14		19	14			
2001	128	63	45	10		10				
2006	139	69	38	15		17				
2011	138	60	35	7		36				
2016	143	42	19	12		47		23		
2021	154	42	19	18		58		17		
2026	157	56	9			56		35		

In October 2024, polls estimate that if there were an election at that time, AfD and Grüne would be roughly equal in size, and FDP would fall to 5%. CDU would be the largest party.

=== Legislative compositions ===
1st Landtag, following 1952 election

2nd Landtag, following 1956 election

3rd Landtag, following 1960 election

4th Landtag, following 1964 election

5th Landtag, following 1968 election

6th Landtag, following 1972 election

7th Landtag, following 1976 election

8th Landtag, following 1980 election

9th Landtag, following 1984 election

10th Landtag, following 1988 election

11th Landtag, following 1992 election

12th Landtag, following 1996 election

13th Landtag, following 2001 election

14th Landtag, following 2006 election

15th Landtag, following 2011 election

16th Landtag, following 2016 election

17th Landtag, following 2021 election

18th Landtag, following 2026 election

=== State election results maps ===
1992 Baden-Württemberg state election, Black is CDU, Red is SPD

1996 Baden-Württemberg state election, Black is CDU, Red is SPD

2001 Baden-Württemberg state election, Black is CDU, Red is SPD

2006 Baden-Württemberg state election, Black is CDU, Red is SPD

2011 Baden-Württemberg state election, Black is CDU, Red is SPD, Green is A90/The Greens

2016 Baden-Württemberg state election, Black is CDU, Green is A90/The Greens, Blue is AfD

2021 Baden-Württemberg state election, Black is CDU, Green is A90/The Greens

2026 Baden-Württemberg state election, Black is CDU, Green is A90/The Greens, Blue is AfD

=== Constituencies in the Landtag ===
No	Constituency	Member	2026	2021	2016	2011	2006	2001	1996	1992	1988	1984	1980	1976
1	Stuttgart I	Muhterem Aras	Green	Green	Green	Green	CDU	SPD	CDU	CDU	CDU	CDU	CDU	CDU
2	Stuttgart II	Cem Özdemir	Green	Green	Green	Green	CDU	CDU	CDU	CDU	CDU	CDU	CDU	CDU
3	Stuttgart III	Oliver Hildenbrand	Green	Green	Green	CDU	CDU	CDU	CDU	CDU	CDU	CDU	CDU	CDU
4	Stuttgart IV	Petra Olschowski	Green	Green	Green	Green	CDU	SPD	CDU	SPD	CDU	CDU	CDU	CDU
5	Böblingen	Regina Dvořák-Vučetić	CDU	Green	Green	CDU	CDU	CDU	CDU	CDU	CDU	CDU	CDU	CDU
6	Leonberg	Albrecht Stickel	CDU	Green	Green	CDU	CDU	CDU	CDU	CDU	CDU	CDU	CDU	CDU
7	Esslingen	Andreas Deuschle	CDU	Green	Green	CDU	CDU	CDU	CDU	CDU	CDU	CDU	CDU	CDU
8	Kirchheim	Natalie Pfau-Weller	CDU	Green	Green	CDU	CDU	CDU	CDU	CDU	CDU	CDU	CDU	CDU
9	Nürtingen	Maren Steege	CDU	Green	Green	CDU	CDU	CDU	CDU	CDU	CDU	CDU	CDU	CDU
10	Göppingen	Sarah Schweizer	CDU	Green	Green	CDU	CDU	CDU	CDU	CDU	CDU	CDU	CDU	CDU
11	Geislingen	Nicole Razavi	CDU	CDU	CDU	CDU	CDU	CDU	CDU	CDU	CDU	CDU	CDU	CDU
12	Ludwigsburg	Lukas Tietze	CDU	Green	Green	CDU	CDU	CDU	CDU	CDU	CDU	CDU	CDU	CDU
13	Vaihingen	Konrad Epple	CDU	Green	Green	CDU	CDU	CDU	CDU	CDU	CDU	CDU	CDU	CDU
14	Bietigheim-Bissingen	Tobias Vogt	CDU	Green	Green	CDU	CDU	CDU	CDU	CDU	CDU	CDU	CDU	CDU
15	Waiblingen	Siegfried Lorek	CDU	Green	Green	CDU	CDU	CDU	CDU	CDU	CDU	CDU	CDU	CDU
16	Schorndorf	Christian Gehring	CDU	Green	Green	CDU	CDU	CDU	CDU	CDU	CDU	CDU	CDU	CDU
17	Backnang	Jens Steinat	CDU	Green	CDU	CDU	CDU	CDU	CDU	CDU	CDU	CDU	CDU	CDU
18	Heilbronn	Thomas Strobl	CDU	Green	Green	CDU	CDU	CDU	CDU	SPD	SPD	CDU	CDU	CDU
19	Eppingen	Michael Preusch	CDU	Green	CDU	CDU	CDU	CDU	CDU	CDU	CDU	CDU	CDU	CDU
20	Neckarsulm	Isabell Huber	CDU	Green	CDU	CDU	CDU	CDU	CDU	CDU	CDU	CDU	CDU	CDU
21	Hohenlohe	Tim Breitkreuz	CDU	Green	CDU	CDU	CDU	CDU	CDU	CDU	CDU	CDU	CDU	CDU
22	Schwäbisch Hall	Tim Breitkreuz	CDU	Green	Green	CDU	CDU	CDU	CDU	CDU	CDU	CDU	CDU	CDU
23	Main-Tauber	Wolfgang Reinhart	CDU	CDU	CDU	CDU	CDU	CDU	CDU	CDU	CDU	CDU	CDU	CDU
24	Heindenheim	Michael Kolb	CDU	Green	Green	CDU	CDU	CDU	CDU	CDU	CDU	CDU	CDU	CDU
25	Schwäbisch Gmünd	Tim Bückner	CDU	Green	CDU	CDU	CDU	CDU	CDU	CDU	CDU	CDU	CDU	CDU
26	Aalen	Winfried Mack	CDU	CDU	CDU	CDU	CDU	CDU	CDU	CDU	CDU	CDU	CDU	CDU
27	Karlsruhe I	Ute Leidig	Green	Green	Green	CDU	CDU	SPD	CDU	CDU	CDU	CDU	CDU	CDU
28	Karlsruhe II	Benjamin Bauer	Green	Green	Green	CDU	CDU	SPD	CDU	CDU	CDU	CDU	CDU	CDU
29	Bruchsal	Thorsten Schwarz	CDU	CDU	CDU	CDU	CDU	CDU	CDU	CDU	CDU	CDU	CDU	CDU
30	Bretten	Ansgar Mayr	CDU	Green	Green	CDU	CDU	CDU	CDU	CDU	CDU	CDU	CDU	CDU
31	Ettlingen	Lorenzo Saladino	CDU	Green	Green	CDU	CDU	CDU	CDU	CDU	CDU	CDU	CDU	CDU
32	Rastatt	Alexander Becker	CDU	Green	Green	CDU	CDU	CDU	CDU	CDU	CDU	CDU	CDU	CDU
33	Baden-Baden	Cornelia von Loga	CDU	Green	Green	CDU	CDU	CDU	CDU	CDU	CDU	CDU	CDU	CDU
34	Heidelberg	Florian Kollmann	Green	Green	Green	Green	CDU	CDU	CDU	SPD	CDU	CDU	CDU	CDU
35	Mannheim I	Bernhadr Pepperl	AfD	Green	AfD	CDU	CDU	CDU	CDU	CDU	Created for 1992 election			
36	Mannheim II	Elke Zimmer	Green	Green	Green	Green	CDU	CDU	CDU	CDU	Created for 1992 election			
37	Wiesloch	Christiane Staab	CDU	Green	CDU	CDU	CDU	CDU	CDU	CDU	Created for 1992 election			
38	Neckar-Odenwald	Peter Hauk	CDU	CDU	CDU	CDU	CDU	CDU	CDU	CDU	CDU	CDU	CDU	CDU
39	Weinheim	Bastian Schneider	CDU	Green	Green	CDU	CDU	CDU	CDU	CDU	CDU	CDU	CDU	CDU
40	Schwetzingen	Andreas Sturm	CDU	Green	Green	CDU	CDU	CDU	CDU	CDU	CDU	CDU	CDU	CDU
41	Sinsheim	Albrecht Schütte	CDU	Green	Green	CDU	CDU	CDU	CDU	CDU	CDU	CDU	CDU	CDU
42	Pforzheim	Andreas Renner	CDU	Green	AfD	CDU	CDU	CDU	CDU	CDU	CDU	CDU	CDU	CDU
43	Calw	Carl-Christian Hirsch	CDU	CDU	CDU	CDU	CDU	CDU	CDU	CDU	CDU	CDU	CDU	CDU
44	Enz	Nico Gunzelmann	CDU	Green	Green	CDU	CDU	CDU	CDU	CDU	CDU	CDU	CDU	CDU
45	Freudenstadt	Katrin Schindele	CDU	CDU	CDU	CDU	CDU	CDU	CDU	CDU	CDU	CDU	CDU	CDU
46	Freiburg I	Daniela Ever	Green	Green	Green	Green	CDU	CDU	CDU	CDU	CDU	CDU	CDU	CDU
47	Freiburg II	Nadyne Saint-Cast	Green	Green	Green	Green	CDU	SPD	CDU	SPD	SPD	SPD	SPD	CDU
48	Breisgau	Patrick Rapp	CDU	Green	Green	CDU	CDU	CDU	CDU	CDU	CDU	CDU	CDU	CDU
49	Emmendingen	Stefanie Wernet	CDU	Green	Green	CDU	CDU	CDU	CDU	CDU	CDU	CDU	CDU	CDU
50	Lahr	Marion Gentges	CDU	Green	Green	CDU	CDU	CDU	CDU	CDU	CDU	CDU	CDU	CDU
51	Offenburg	Volker Schebesta	CDU	Green	Green	CDU	CDU	CDU	CDU	CDU	CDU	CDU	CDU	CDU
52	Kehl	Katrin Merkel	CDU	Green	CDU	CDU	CDU	CDU	CDU	CDU	CDU	CDU	CDU	CDU
53	Rottweil	Stefan Teufel	CDU	CDU	CDU	CDU	CDU	CDU	CDU	CDU	CDU	CDU	CDU	CDU
54	Villingen-Schwenningen	Andreas Braun	CDU	Green	Green	CDU	CDU	CDU	CDU	CDU	CDU	CDU	CDU	CDU
55	Tuttlingen-Donaueschingen	Guido Wolf	CDU	CDU	CDU	CDU	CDU	CDU	CDU	CDU	CDU	CDU	CDU	CDU
56	Konstanz	Nese Erikli	Green	Green	Green	Green	CDU	CDU	CDU	CDU	CDU	CDU	CDU	CDU
57	Singen	Christoph Stetter	CDU	Green	Green	CDU	CDU	CDU	CDU	CDU	CDU	CDU	CDU	CDU
58	Lörrach	Sarah Hagmann	Green	Green	Green	CDU	CDU	SPD	CDU	SPD	CDU	CDU	CDU	CDU
59	Waldshut	Simon Herzog	CDU	Green	CDU	CDU	CDU	CDU	CDU	CDU	CDU	CDU	CDU	CDU
60	Reutlingen	Maximilian Menton	CDU	Green	Green	CDU	CDU	CDU	CDU	CDU	CDU	CDU	CDU	CDU
61	Hechingen-Münsingen	Manuel Hailfinger	CDU	Green	CDU	CDU	CDU	CDU	CDU	CDU	CDU	CDU	CDU	CDU
62	Tübingen	Daniel Lede Abal	Green	Green	Green	Green	CDU	CDU	CDU	CDU	CDU	CDU	CDU	CDU
63	Balingen	Nicole Hoffmeister-Kraut	CDU	CDU	CDU	CDU	CDU	CDU	CDU	CDU	CDU	CDU	CDU	CDU
64	Ulm	Mario Schneider	CDU	Green	Green	CDU	CDU	CDU	CDU	CDU	CDU	CDU	CDU	CDU
65	Ehingen	Manuel Hagel	CDU	CDU	CDU	CDU	CDU	CDU	CDU	CDU	CDU	CDU	CDU	CDU
66	Biberach	Thomas Dörflinger	CDU	CDU	CDU	CDU	CDU	CDU	CDU	CDU	CDU	CDU	CDU	CDU
67	Bodensee	Alexander Bruns	CDU	Green	Green	CDU	CDU	CDU	CDU	CDU	CDU	CDU	CDU	CDU
68	Wangen	Raimund Haser	CDU	Green	CDU	CDU	CDU	CDU	CDU	CDU	CDU	CDU	CDU	CDU
69	Ravensburg	Antje Rommelspacher	CDU	Green	Green	CDU	CDU	CDU	CDU	CDU	CDU	CDU	CDU	CDU
70	Sigmaringen	Ilona Boos	CDU	Green	Green	CDU	CDU	CDU	CDU	CDU	CDU	CDU	CDU	CDU

== Constituencies in the Bundestag ==
No	Constituency	Member	2021	Voters	2017	2013	2009	2005	2002	1998	1994	1990
258	Stuttgart I	Cem Özdemir	Grüne	191,811	CDU	CDU	CDU	CDU	SPD	CDU	CDU	CDU
259	Stuttgart II	Maximilian Mörseburg	CDU	178,958	CDU	CDU	CDU	SPD	SPD	SPD	CDU	CDU
260	Böblingen	Marc Biadacz	CDU	245,553	CDU	CDU	CDU	CDU	CDU	CDU	CDU	CDU
261	Esslingen	Markus Grübel	CDU	166,628	CDU	CDU	CDU	CDU	CDU	SPD	CDU	CDU
262	Nürtingen	Michael Hennrich	CDU	205,967	CDU	CDU	CDU	CDU	CDU	CDU	CDU	CDU
263	Göppingen	Hermann Färber	CDU	177,107	CDU	CDU	CDU	CDU	CDU	CDU	CDU	CDU
264	Waiblingen	Christina Stumpp	CDU	221,775	CDU	CDU	CDU	CDU	CDU	CDU	CDU	CDU
265	Ludwigsburg	Steffen Bilger	CDU	215,312	CDU	CDU	CDU	CDU	CDU	CDU	CDU	CDU
266	Neckar-Zaber	Fabian Gramling	CDU	230,738	CDU	CDU	CDU	CDU	CDU	SPD	CDU	CDU
267	Heilbronn	Alexander Throm	CDU	240,951	CDU	CDU	CDU	CDU	CDU	CDU	CDU	CDU
268	Schwäbisch Hall – Hohenlohe	Christian von Stetten	CDU	225,874	CDU	CDU	CDU	CDU	CDU	CDU	CDU	CDU
269	Backnang – Schwäbisch Gmünd	Ingeborg Gräßle	CDU	177,062	CDU	CDU	CDU	CDU	CDU	CDU	CDU	CDU
270	Aalen - Heidenheim	Roderich Kiesewetter	CDU	220,686	CDU	CDU	CDU	CDU	CDU	CDU	CDU	CDU
271	Karlsruhe-Stadt	Zoe Mayer	Grüne	205,608	CDU	CDU	CDU	CDU	SPD	SPD	CDU	CDU
272	Karlsruhe-Land	Nicolas Zippelius	CDU	209,147	CDU	CDU	CDU	CDU	CDU	CDU	CDU	CDU
273	Rastatt	Kai Whittaker	CDU	204,890	CDU	CDU	CDU	CDU	CDU	CDU	CDU	CDU
274	Heidelberg	Franziska Brantner	Grüne	218,431	CDU	CDU	CDU	CDU	SPD	SPD	CDU	CDU
275	Mannheim	Isabel Cademartori	SPD	196,863	CDU	CDU	CDU	SPD	SPD	SPD	CDU	SPD
276	Odenwald - Tauber	Nina Warken	CDU	209,418	CDU	CDU	CDU	CDU	CDU	CDU	CDU	CDU
277	Rhein-Neckar	Moritz Oppelt	CDU	196,882	CDU	CDU	CDU	CDU	CDU	CDU	CDU	CDU
278	Bruchsal - Schwetzingen	Olav Gutting	CDU	195,755	CDU	CDU	CDU	CDU	CDU	Created for 2002 election		
279	Pforzheim	Gunther Krichbaum	CDU	217,126	CDU	CDU	CDU	CDU	CDU	SPD	CDU	CDU
280	Calw	Klaus Mack	CDU	199,092	CDU	CDU	CDU	CDU	CDU	CDU	CDU	CDU
281	Freiburg	Chantal Kopf	Grüne	224,392	CDU	CDU	SPD	SPD	SPD	SPD	CDU	CDU
282	Lörrach - Müllheim	Diana Stöcker	CDU	231,076	CDU	CDU	CDU	SPD	SPD	SPD	CDU	CDU
283	Emmendingen - Lahr	Yannick Bury	CDU	218,872	CDU	CDU	CDU	CDU	CDU	CDU	CDU	CDU
284	Offenburg	Vacant	CDU	205,893	CDU	CDU	CDU	CDU	CDU	CDU	CDU	CDU
285	Rottweil - Tuttlingen	Maria-Lena Weiss	CDU	198,182	CDU	CDU	CDU	CDU	CDU	CDU	CDU	CDU
286	Schwarzwald-Baar	Thorsten Frei	CDU	162,800	CDU	CDU	CDU	CDU	CDU	CDU	CDU	CDU
287	Konstanz	Andreas Jung	CDU	206,009	CDU	CDU	CDU	CDU	CDU	CDU	CDU	CDU
288	Waldshut	Felix Schreiner	CDU	177,275	CDU	CDU	CDU	CDU	CDU	CDU	CDU	CDU
289	Reutlingen	Michael Donth	CDU	199,189	CDU	CDU	CDU	CDU	CDU	CDU	CDU	CDU
290	Tübingen	Annette Widmann-Mauz	CDU	198,791	CDU	CDU	CDU	CDU	CDU	SPD	CDU	CDU
291	Ulm	Ronja Kemmer	CDU	223,376	CDU	CDU	CDU	CDU	CDU	CDU	CDU	CDU
292	Biberach	Josef Rief	CDU	169,147	CDU	CDU	CDU	CDU	CDU	CDU	CDU	CDU
293	Bodensee	Volker Mayer-Lay	CDU	174,430	CDU	CDU	CDU	Created for 2009 election				
294	Ravensburg	Axel Müller	CDU	187,817	CDU	CDU	CDU	Created for 2009 election				
295	Zollernalb - Sigmaringen	Thomas Bareiß	CDU	182,648	CDU	CDU	CDU	CDU	CDU	CDU	CDU	CDU

== See also ==
- Elections in Baden-Württemberg
