= Annkathrin Wulff =

German politician (born 1986)

Member of the Landtag of Baden-Württemberg
- Incumbent
- Assumed office 11 May 2026

Personal details
- Born: 1986 (age 39–40)
- Party: Social Democratic Party

Annkathrin Wulff (born 1986) is a German politician serving as a member of the Landtag of Baden-Württemberg since 2026. She is the chairwoman of the Social Democratic Party in Pforzheim and Enzkreis.
