= WiR2020 =

WiR2020 WiR2020
- Abbreviation: W2020
- Leader: Wolfgang Romberg; Sonja Früh
- Founded: 14 June 2020; 4 years ago
- Headquarters: Bad Homburg
- Membership (2021): 4,600
- Ideology: Anti-vaccinationism; Anti-lockdown
- Bundestag: 0 / 709
- European Parliament: 0 / 96

Website
- wir2020partei.eu

WiR2020 is a minor party in Germany aimed primarily at opponents of vaccinations.

== Elections ==
In 2021, WiR2020 stood in the Baden-Württemberg state election for 68 out of the 70 constituencies and gained 0,8% of the vote. They also stood in the Saxony-Anhalt state election having 0,2% of the vote from 1,649 votes.
