= Alliance C – Christians for Germany =

Alliance C – Christians for Germany Bündnis C – Christen für Deutschland
- Spokesperson: Karin Heepen
- Founded: 28 March 2015; 11 years ago
- Merger of: PBC, AUF
- Headquarters: Karlsruhe
- Newspaper: EINDRUCK – das Magazin für Politik von Bündnis C
- Membership (2019): 3,000
- Ideology: Christian right Social conservatism
- Political position: Right-wing
- Religion: Christian fundamentalism Evangelicalism
- European affiliation: European Christian Political Party
- Bundestag: 0 / 630 (0%)
- Bundesrat: 0 / 69 (0%)
- European Parliament: 0 / 96 (0%)

Website
- buendnis-c.de

Alliance C – Christians for Germany (German: Bündnis C – Christen für Deutschland) is a Christian Conservative political party in Germany, which was established in 2015 as a result of the amalgamation of Partei Bibeltreuer Christen (Party of Bible-abiding Christians) and the AUF - Partei für Arbeit, Umwelt und Familie (Party for Labour, Environment and Family). The party professes to adhere to the Apostles' Creed and the Old and New Testaments.

Alliance C is a member of the European Christian Political Party (ECPP) and was represented in the European Parliament from October 2018 until the 2019 European elections.

== History ==
At the founding party conference in Fulda in March 2015, the Party for Labour, Environment and Family (AUF) and Party of Bible-abiding Christians (PBC) merged to form Alliance C – Christians for Germany – AUF & PBC. Ole Steffes (formerly PBC) and Karin Heepen (formerly AUF) were elected Federal Chairmen with equal rights.

The party stood for the first time in the state election in Baden-Württemberg in 2016 and achieved 0.7% in the state constituency of Enz. In the state election in Mecklenburg-Western Pomerania in 2016, it received 842 votes, which corresponds to 0.1% of the votes. In the local elections in Lower Saxony in 2016, the party won a mandate in both Wedemark and Bad Essen. At the party congress on October 22, 2016, the members decided to delete the suffix "AUF & PBC".

An attempted candidacy for the 2017 Bundestag election with eight state lists failed due to a lack of support signatures, so that the party could only put up direct candidates in four constituencies. These achieved results between 0.2% and 0.4% of the votes.

In autumn 2018, MEP Arne Gericke joined Alliance C. Gericke was elected for the Family Party in 2014 and initially switched to the Free Voters in mid-2017. Gericke has been an individual member of the ECPM since 2014, which also includes Alliance C.

== Ideology ==
Alliance C, according to its own statements, is based on Christian ethics and principles that have shaped the liberal-democratic constitutional state. In terms of its family, social, educational and foreign policies, it takes on a "Christian-conservative" stance. Specifically, it opposes abortion. The party affirms marriage and family to be a divine union between a man and a woman. It advocates providing educational allowances for parents, and recognises home-schooling as a valid alternative to compulsory schooling. On a global level, it advocates strengthening nations and decries international and supranational alliances, such as the UN and the EU. The party also takes an uncompromisingly pro-Israeli stance. Notably, its predecessor organisations were firmly within the Christian fundamentalist spectrum.

== Election results ==
=== Federal Parliament (Bundestag) ===
Election	Constituency		Party list		Seats	+/–	Status
Election	Votes	%	Votes	%	Seats	+/–	Status
2017			1,717 (#32)	0.0 #24	0 / 631	New	Extra-parliamentary
2021	6,222	0.01	39,868	0.09	0 / 631	0	Extra-parliamentary
2025	2,021	0.00	11,784	0.02	0 / 631	0	TBD

=== European Parliament ===
Election	List leader	Votes	%	Seats	+/–	EP Group
2019	Arne Gericke	66,327	0.18 (#25)	0 / 96	New	–
2024	Karin Heepen	75,053	0.19 (#24)	0 / 96	0	–

== Mandates ==
=== District Results ===
==== Mecklenburg-Western Pomerania ====
In 2004, the PBC secured a seat on the district council in the district of Güstrow, the PBC representative later joined AUF. The seat was retained in the 2014 and 2019 elections, under the name Bündnis C, now in the larger, regionally expanded Rostock district. Additionally, the party was able to hold a seat in the municipality of Kuchelmiß in the 2019 elections.

==== Saarland ====
In the Saarland local council elections of 2014, the AUF party gained a seat in Mettlach. Five years later, the party did not run again. In the Mettlach district of Wehingen, 2 seats in the local council were held in the 2019 election, but under the AUF party name.

==== Niedersachsen ====
In the 2016 regional elections in Niedersachsen, Alliance C won mandates for the first time. In the municipal elections, the party achieved two seats; one in Bad Essen and the other in Wedemark. In the Wedemark district of Hellendorf, Alliance C also secured a seat in the local council. Nevertheless, the party lost its mandate in Gifhorn. In the elections of 2021, Alliance C retained the seat in Bad Essen and the local seat in Hellendorf.

==== Hessen ====
In the 2021 local elections in Hesse, Alliance C won a mandate in Fulda and has since formed a parliamentary group in the city council with the AfD.

=== European Parliament ===
Alliance C had been represented with a seat in the European Parliament since October 2018. However, this mandate was lost in 2019, as the party achieved only 0.2% in the European election and thus did not reach the number of votes required for a seat in the Parliament.
