= Edith Sitzmann =

German politician (born 1963)

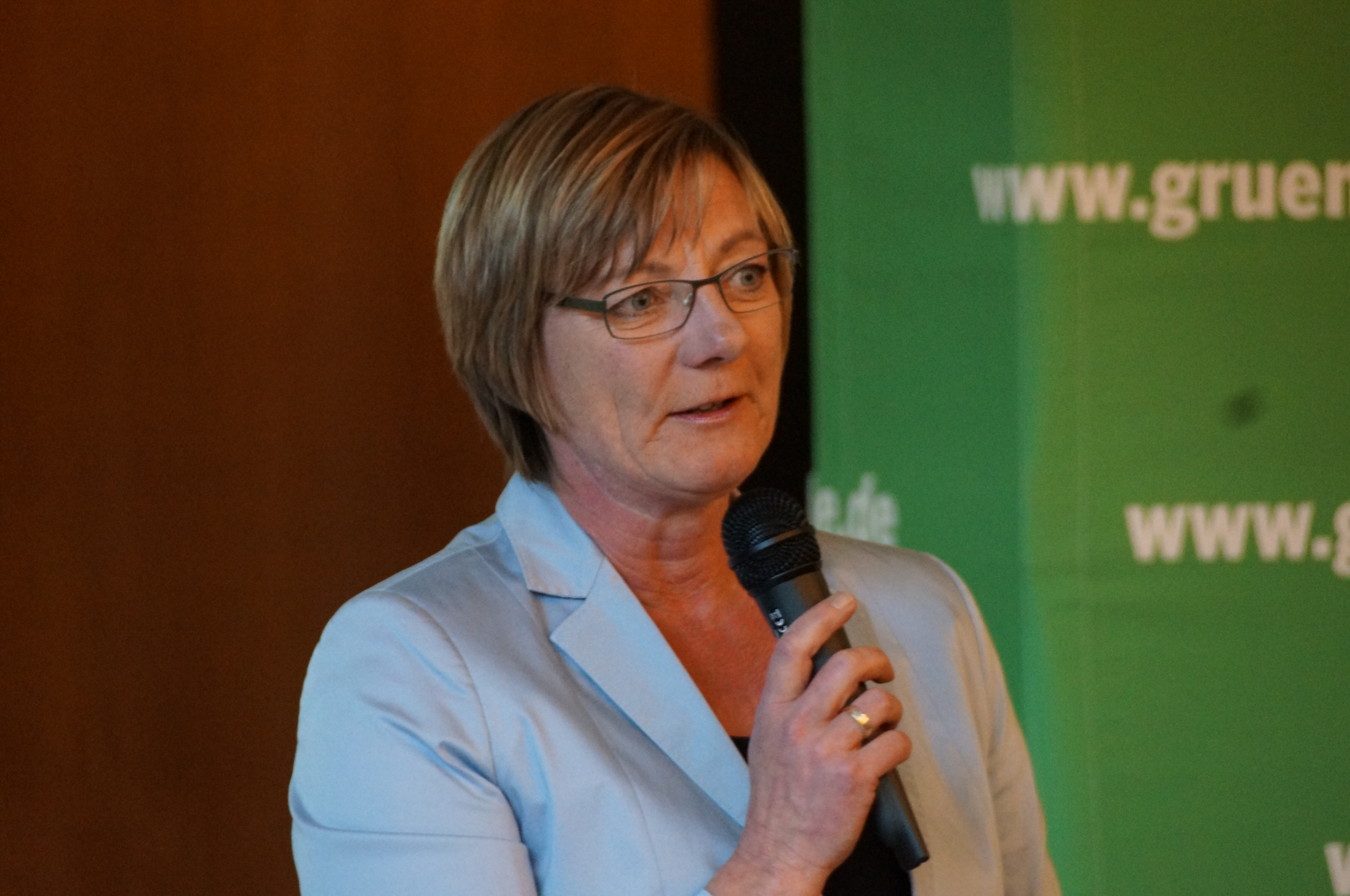
- Sitzmann in 2016

Landtag of Baden-Württemberg
- Incumbent
- Assumed office August 2002

Minister of Finance for Baden-Württemberg
- In office May 2016 – 2021
- Preceded by: Nils Schmid
- Succeeded by: Danyal Bayaz

Personal details
- Born: January 4, 1963 (age 63) Regensburg, West Germany (now Germany)
- Party: Alliance 90/The Greens

Edith Sitzmann (born 4 January 1963) is a German politician of the Alliance 90/The Greens party served as State Minister of Finance in the second cabinet of Minister-President Winfried Kretschmann of Baden-Württemberg from 2017 to 2021. She was also a member of the State Parliament, representing the Freiburg II constituency. From 2011 to 2016, she led the Green Party's Group in the State Parliament.

== Early life and education ==
Sitzmann was born on 4 January 1963 in Regensburg. She studied the humanities at the University of Freiburg, the University of Regensburg, and Heidelberg University. Sitzmann earned a magister degree in 1989, then began working until 1991 as a tour guide for American exchange students.

== Political career ==
Sitzmann joined the Alliance 90/The Greens party. From 1993 to 2001, she was a personal friend of and adviser to Dieter Salomon, a member of the Landtag of Baden-Württemberg. From 1994, she also worked as a freelance presenter and consultant for non-profit organizations until 2001, when she started her own business. In that time, Sitzmann also joined the district board of Alliance 90/The Greens from 1993 to 1994, and then the party's state board from 1995 to 1999.

In the negotiations to form a coalition government with the Christian Democratic Union (CDU) under the leadership of Kretschmann following the 2016 state elections, Sitzmann led her party’s delegation in the working group on integration.

In May 2016, Sitzmann was appointed State Minister of Finance for Baden-Württemberg. She announced in 2020 that she would not stand for reelection in the 2021 state elections.

== Other activities ==
=== Corporate boards ===
- EnBW, Ex-Officio Member of the Board of Supervisory Directors (2017–2021)
- KfW, Ex-Officio Member of the Board of Supervisory Directors (2017–2021)
- Landesbank Baden-Württemberg (LBBW), Ex-Officio Member of the Board of Supervisory Directors (2017–2021)

=== Non-profit organizations ===
- German Federation for the Environment and Nature Conservation (BUND)
- Nature and Biodiversity Conservation Union (NABU), Member
