= Second Kretschmann cabinet =

Second Cabinet of Winfried Kretschmann Cabinet Kretschmann II
- 24th Cabinet of Baden-Württemberg
- 12 May 2016 – 11 May 2021
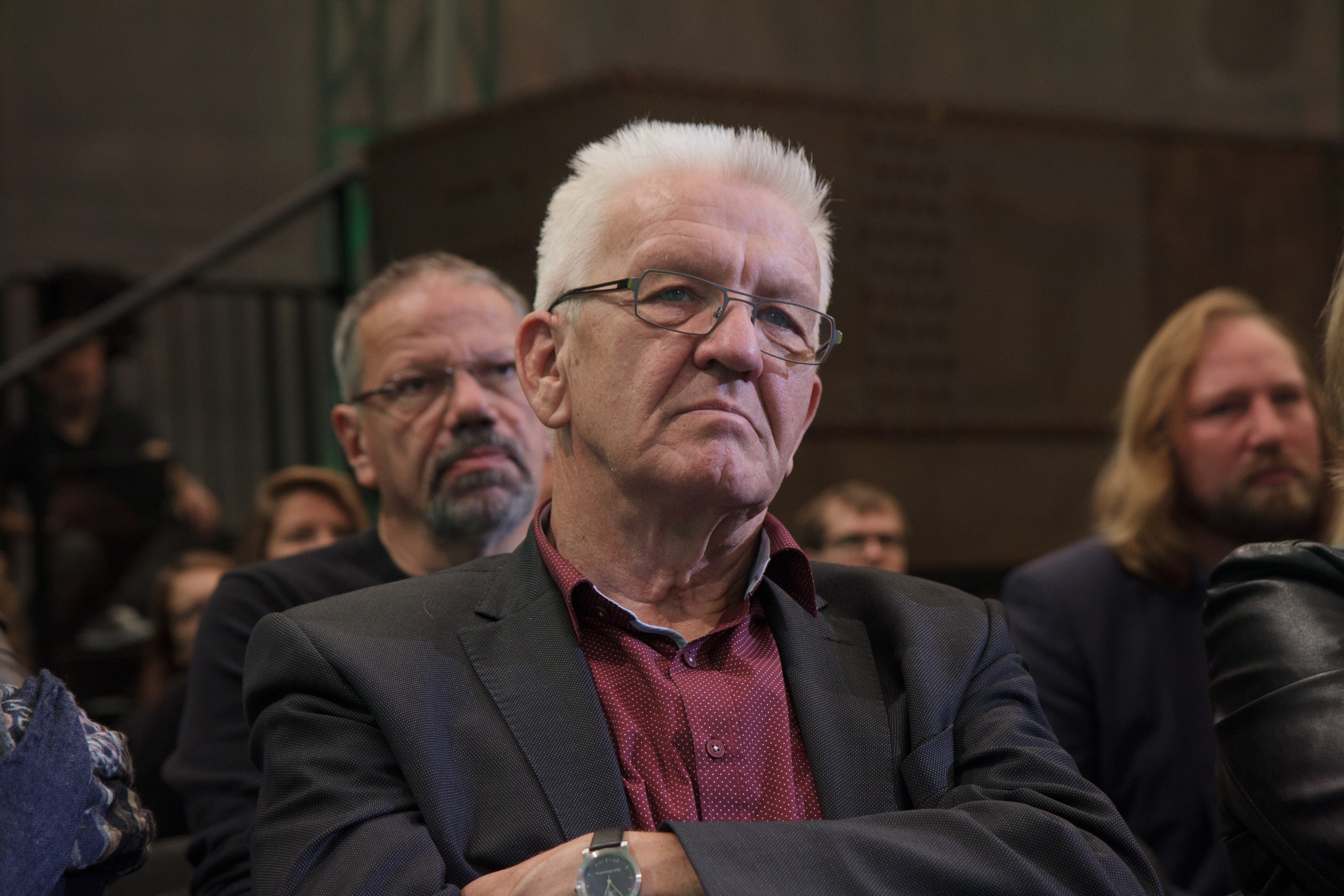
- Winfried Kretschmann in Berlin in September 2017
- Date formed: 12 May 2016
- Date dissolved: 11 May 2021

People and organisations
- Minister-President: Winfried Kretschmann
- Deputy Minister-President: Thomas Strobl
- No. of ministers: 12
- Member parties: Alliance 90/The Greens; Christian Democratic Union
- Status in legislature: Coalition government (Majority)
- Opposition parties: Alternative for Germany; Social Democratic Party; Free Democratic Party

History
- Election: 2016 Baden-Württemberg state election
- Legislature term: 16th Landtag of Baden-Württemberg
- Predecessor: Kretschmann I
- Successor: Kretschmann III

The second Kretschmann cabinet was the state government of Baden-Württemberg between 2016 and 2021, sworn in on 12 May 2021 after Winfried Kretschmann was elected as Minister-President of Baden-Württemberg by the members of the Landtag of Baden-Württemberg. It was the 24th Cabinet of Baden-Württemberg.

It was formed after the 2016 Baden-Württemberg state election by Alliance 90/The Greens (GRÜNE) and the Christian Democratic Union (CDU). Excluding the Minister-President, the cabinet comprised twelve ministers. Seven were members of the Greens and five were members of the CDU.

The second Kretschmann cabinet was succeeded by the third Kretschmann cabinet on 12 May 2021.

== Formation ==
The previous cabinet was a coalition government of the Greens and Social Democratic Party (SPD) led by Minister-President Winfried Kretschmann.

The election took place on 13 March 2016, and resulted in a significant swing toward the Greens, who became the largest party. The SPD and opposition CDU both suffered major losses, and the AfD debuted at 15%. The FDP also recorded gains.

Overall, the incumbent coalition lost its majority. The Greens held exploratory talks with the CDU, SPD, and FDP. The FDP ruled out a traffic light coalition with the Greens and SPD due to policy differences, while the SPD ruled out a coalition with the CDU and FDP. Thus, a coalition between the Greens and CDU was considered the most viable option.

The CDU voted on 30 March to open coalition negotiations with the Greens. Talks began on 1 April and concluded on the 29th, with the coalition agreement presented on 1 May. It was approved by the CDU and Greens congresses on 6 and 7 May, and officially signed two days later.

Kretschmann was elected Minister-President by the Landtag on 12 May, winning 82 votes of 142 cast.

== Composition ==
The composition of the cabinet at the time of its dissolution was as follows:

Portfolio	Minister	Party	Took office	Left office	State secretaries
Minister-President; Commissioner for Church Affairs	Winfried Kretschmann born 17 May 1948 (age 77)	GRÜNE	12 May 2016	11 May 2021	Andre Baumann (Representative to the Federal Government); Florian Stegmann (Coordinator for Bureaucracy Reduction and Better Regulation)
Deputy Minister-President Minister for Interior, Digitalisation and Migration; Commissioner for Expellees and Late Resettlers	Thomas Strobl born 17 March 1960 (age 66)	CDU	12 May 2016	11 May 2021	Wilfried Klenk
Minister for Finance	Edith Sitzmann born 4 January 1963 (age 63)	GRÜNE	12 May 2016	11 May 2021	Gisela Splett
Minister for Education, Youth and Sport	Susanne Eisenmann born 28 November 1964 (age 61)	CDU	12 May 2016	11 May 2021	Volker Schebesta
Minister for Science, Research and Arts	Theresia Bauer born 6 April 1965 (age 61)	GRÜNE	12 May 2016	11 May 2021	Petra Olschowski
Minister for Environment, Climate and Energy Industry	Franz Untersteller born 4 April 1957 (age 69)	GRÜNE	12 May 2016	11 May 2021	Andre Baumann
Minister for Economics, Labour and Housing Construction	Nicole Hoffmeister-Kraut born 9 October 1972 (age 53)	CDU	12 May 2016	11 May 2021	Katrin Schütz
Minister for Social Affairs and Integration	Manfred Lucha born 13 March 1961 (age 65)	GRÜNE	12 May 2016	11 May 2021	Bärbl Mielich
Minister for Rural Areas and Consumer Protection	Peter Hauk born 24 December 1960 (age 65)	CDU	12 May 2016	11 May 2021	Friedlinde Gurr-Hirsch
Minister for Justice and Europe	Guido Wolf born 28 September 1961 (age 64)	CDU	12 May 2016	11 May 2021	
Minister for Transport	Winfried Hermann born 19 July 1952 (age 73)	GRÜNE	12 May 2016	11 May 2021	
State Councillor for Civil Society and Civic Participation	Gisela Erler born 9 May 1946 (age 79)	GRÜNE	12 May 2016	11 May 2021	
Minister of State in the State Ministry	Klaus-Peter Murawski born 17 May 1950 (age 75)	GRÜNE	12 May 2016	31 August 2018	
Minister of State in the State Ministry	Theresa Schopper born 9 April 1961 (age 65)	GRÜNE	9 October 2018	11 May 2021	
