= First Kretschmann cabinet =

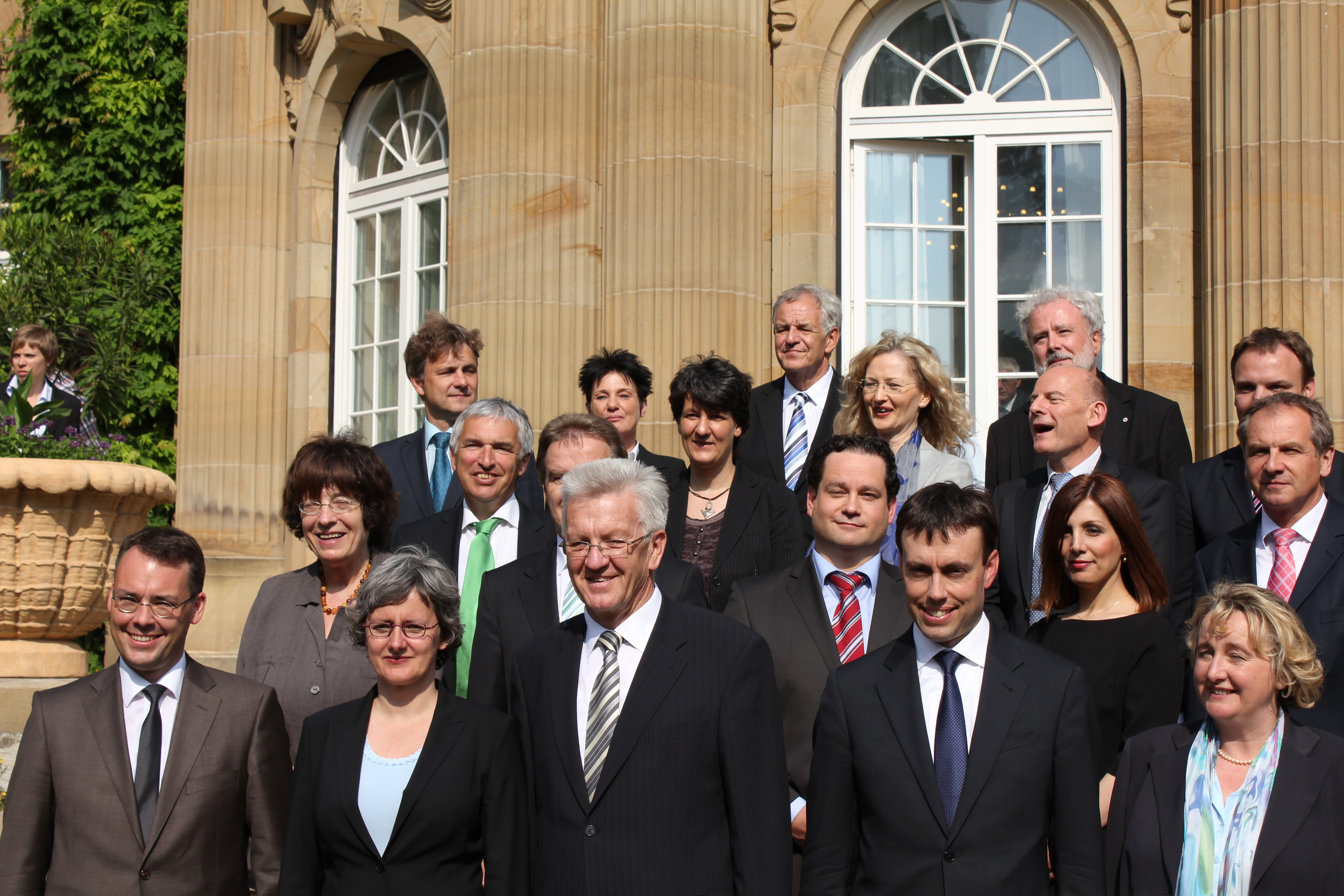
Cabinet Kretschmann I

The Cabinet Kretschmann I was the government of the German state of Baden-Württemberg which has been in office from 12 May 2011 to 11 May 2016. The Cabinet was headed by Prime Minister Winfried Kretschmann and was formed by a coalition of the Green Party and the Social Democrats. It was the first state-level government to be headed by a member of the Green Party in German history, with Kretschmann the ninth head of government since Baden-Württemberg was founded in 1952. It was succeeded by the Cabinet Kretschmann II.

Seven cabinet members were from the SPD and four cabinet positions as well as the office of State Ministry of Baden-Württemberg were held by members of the Green Party. In addition, a full-time salaried vice minister and honorary vice minister from the Green Party also served in the cabinet and are entitled to vote. Three additional junior ministers held political offices below the cabinet level. The officials were sworn into office at the state parliament on 12 May 2011.

Cabinet members held the office of Ministers of their respective portfolio, except where this is specified otherwise.

Office	Name	Party	Secretary of State
Minister President	Winfried Kretschmann	Green Party	Gisela Erler; State Counsellor for Civil Society and Civic Participation (holding cabinet rank)
Deputy Prime Minister; Finance and Economics	Nils Schmid	SPD	Ingo Rust
State Ministry	Silke Krebs	Green Party	–
Interior	Reinhold Gall	SPD	–
Justice	Rainer Stickelberger	SPD	–
Education, Youth and Sports	Gabriele Warminski-Leitheußer	SPD	Frank Mentrup
Science, Research and Culture	Theresia Bauer	Green Party	Jürgen Walter
Labour, Social Affairs, Families, Women and Senior Citizens	Katrin Altpeter	SPD	–
Transport and Infrastructure	Winfried Hermann	Green Party	Gisela Splett (holding cabinet rank)
Environment, Climate Protection and Energy	Franz Untersteller	Green Party	–
Rural Affairs and Consumer Protection	Alexander Bonde	Green Party	–
Integration	Bilkay Öney	SPD	–
Bundesrat, Europe and International Affairs	Peter Friedrich	SPD	–
