= Theresia Bauer =

German politician (born 1965)

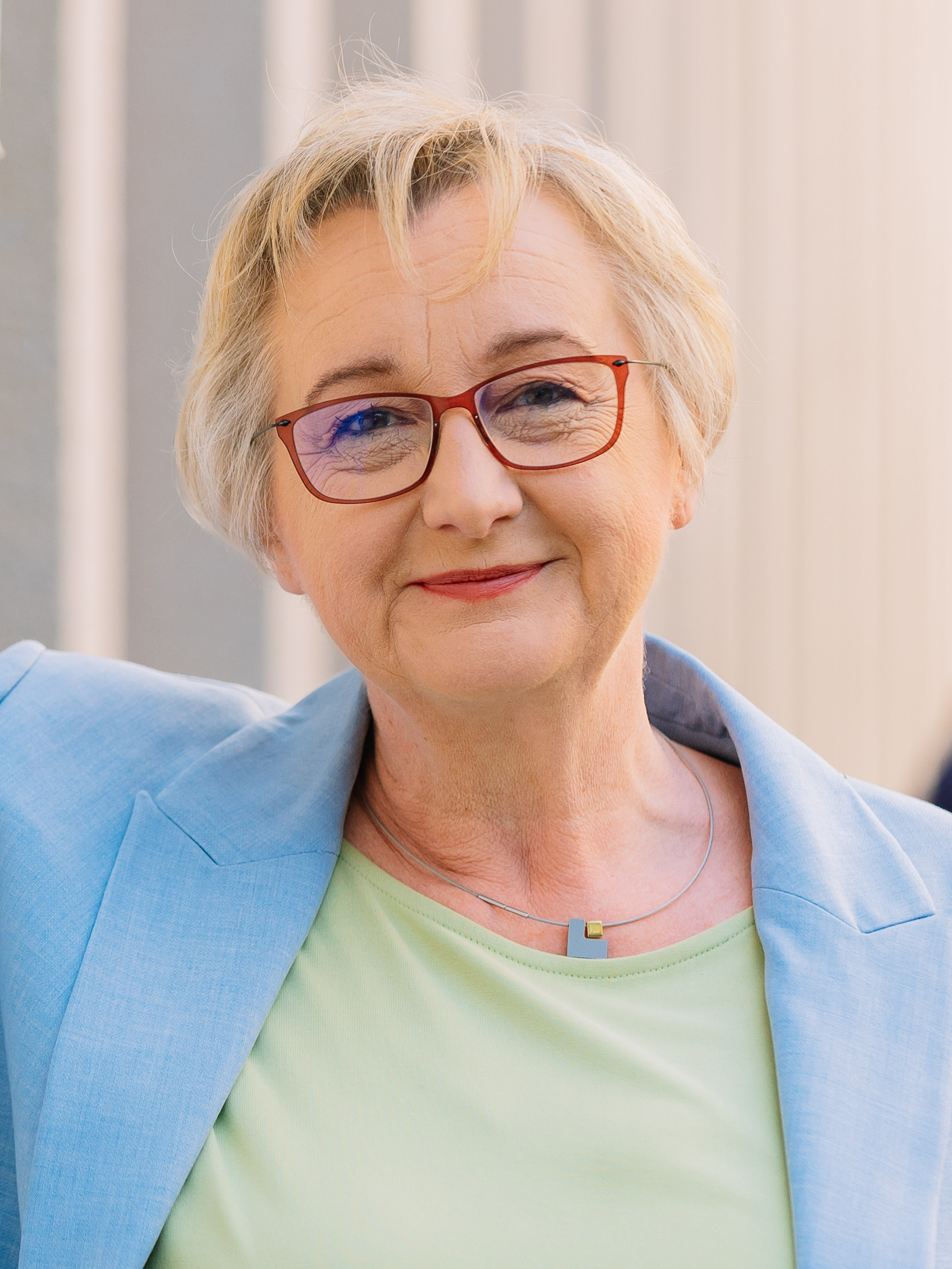
- Bauer in 2022

Member of the Landtag of Baden-Württemberg
- In office June 2001 – June 2024

State Minister for Science, Research and the Arts of Baden-Württemberg
- In office May 2011 – September 2022
- Succeeded by: Petra Olschowski

Personal details
- Born: 6 April 1965 (age 61) Zweibrücken, West Germany
- Party: Alliance 90/The Greens
- Education: University of Mannheim; University of Heidelberg

Theresia Bauer (born 6 April 1965) is a German politician from the Alliance 90/The Greens. She was a member of the Landtag of Baden-Württemberg from June 2001 to June 2024, representing the constituency of Heidelberg. From May 2011 to September 2022, she was State Minister for Science, Research and the Arts. Since June 2024, she has been managing director of the Baden-Württemberg Foundation.

== Biography ==
Bauer was born on 6 April 1965 in Zweibrücken. She and her three siblings grew up in a Catholic home. She attended primary school in Kübelberg and then high school in Homburg, Saarland. After graduating from high school in 1984, she studied political science, economics and German studies at the University of Mannheim before studying at the Ruprecht-Karls-University of Heidelberg from 1985 to 1993 and graduating with a master of arts in 1993.

From 1992 to 1993, she worked in the Office for Women's Issues in the City of Heidelberg and then from 1993 to 1995 as a speaker for political education in the Society for Political Ecology. From 1995 until her election to the state parliament in 2001, she was managing director of the Heinrich Böll Foundation Baden-Württemberg. From 2011 to 2022, she was also chairwoman of the Carl Zeiss Foundation. On 15 June 2024, she became managing director of the Baden-Württemberg Foundation after resigning her mandate from the state parliament.

Bauer is married and lives in Heidelberg. She has two grown sons.

== Early political career ==
=== As a member of the Greens ===
Bauer has been a member of the Green Party since 1987. Since 1999, Theresia Bauer has been a member of the Green Party's Heidelberg district executive committee, and from 2003 to 2011 she was chairwoman of the Heidelberg district association. Between 2001 and 2011 she was a member of the state executive committee of Alliance 90/The Greens Baden-Württemberg.

=== As a member of the state parliament ===
From June 2001, she was a member of the Landtag of Baden-Württemberg and, as in 2006, entered the state parliament via the state list. She was deputy chairwoman of her parliamentary group from May 2002 to 2011. Until 2011, she was a member of the Committee for Science, Research and the Arts and a member of the supervisory board of the Baden-Württemberg Foundation.

In the 2011 state election, Theresia Bauer won the direct mandate in the Heidelberg constituency for the first time with 36.7 percent of the vote, which she was able to defend in 2016 with 41.0 percent and in 2021 with 41.7 percent.

On 14 June 2024, Bauer resigned from her state parliament mandate when she was appointed managing director of the Baden-Württemberg Foundation. Marilena Geugjes took her vacated seat.

== Government career ==
=== As State Minister for Science, Research and the Arts ===
On 12 May 2011, she was sworn in for the first time as State Minister for Science, Research and the Arts in the first Kretschmann cabinet in the Landtag of Baden-Württemberg and held this post in the successor governments Kretschmann II and Kretschmann III until September 2022. As minister she was responsible for the development of science and technology in the state.

As minister, she abolished tuition fees, in 2012 as part of the red-green government. She increased the number of places in the Bachelor's and Master's programmes (expansion of the "Higher Education Pact 2020 2012 " program, "Master 2016" programme) and reintroduced the organized student body in Baden-Württemberg (after its abolition in 1977). Unlike some other federal states, Baden-Württemberg fully compensates for the universities' lost income due to the abolition of tuition fees. The amendment to the State University Act that she initiated was developed in constant exchange with the universities and was therefore able to have it passed quietly. Bauer has set up commissions to deal with the reform of teacher training and with strengthening sustainability in science.

In autumn 2012, a state party conference of the Baden-Württemberg Greens decided to follow Bauer's line of not including a civil clause in the state university law, in consideration of the historical importance of academic freedom, and instead to significantly increase transparency in the area of third-party funding. On 17 July 2013, Bauer presented a concept according to which music universities in Baden-Württemberg would save 4 million euros per year. This would have meant the elimination of hundreds of study places and numerous study courses and was therefore met with widespread criticism but she defended the plan proposed savings. Mannheim State University of Music and Performing Arts opposed the efforts to abolish classical orchestral training in Mannheim. Bauer later abandoned the plans, but urged the music universities to develop a stronger profile and focus on the needs of the labour market.

In the COVID-19 pandemic in Germany, Bauer supported the federal government creating a special fund to support students. In 2022, she visited the United States as part of a delegation for the 30th anniversary of the scientific partnership between Baden-Württemberg and the state of Connecticut.

=== Universities policy ===
In January 2015, the new university funding agreement, "Perspective 2020", which Bauer played a key role in negotiating, was signed. This meant that the universities in Baden-Württemberg received 1.7 billion euros in additional funding from the state until 2020, some of which had been released because the federal government had completely taken over the BAföG funding. Of this, 1.1 billion euros went directly into basic funding. 600 million euros were made available to increase the university construction program. The new agreement gave the universities significantly more planning security. Baden-Württemberg was thus the first federal state to follow the recommendation of the German Science and Humanities Council to increase the basic funding of universities by 3 percent per year.

In October 2016, in view of the enormous increase in student numbers, she proposed the reintroduction of tuition fees for non-EU citizens and second-year students as a measure to consolidate the Baden-Württemberg budget. The fees were approved in May 2017. The proposal included tuition fees of 1,500 euros per semester for non-EU citizens, 650 euros for second-year students and an increase in the administrative contribution for all students by 10 euros for the winter semester 2017–2018.

Under Theresia Bauer, the Doctoral Association of the Universities of Applied Sciences Baden-Württemberg was founded in 2022, which gave the universities of applied sciences the opportunity to exercise the right to award doctorates without the universities. The aim is to open up a new way for graduates of the universities of applied sciences to develop further scientifically and at the same time to strengthen the universities as an institution. In September 2022, Bauer granted the association, founded in May 2022, the right to award doctorates.

=== Research policy ===
In 2016, Bauer launched the Cyber Valley initiative with partners from science and industry. It is one of the largest research collaborations for artificial intelligence in Europe, based in Tübingen. In addition to the universities of Tübingen and Stuttgart, partners include companies such as Daimler and Amazon. In a first step, the state and its partners invested around 165 million euros in the development of Cyber Valley.

In spring 2018, Bauer advocated the construction of two research buildings on the innovation campus in Heidelberg. At the campus of the research network between the Heidelberg University and the Max Planck Society, research is carried out on cells at the nano level. The campus was created on the initiative of Nobel Prize winner Stefan Hell and is supported by the state of Baden-Württemberg with 25 million euros.

=== Education policy ===
Under Bauer's aegis, the state government provided 18 million euros for the Baden and Württemberg wind music academies by 2020. The funds were used for the new building project of the Baden-Württemberg Music Center in Plochingen and the Music Academy of the German Wind Music Association in Staufen im Breisgau.

In September 2018, Bauer launched the ideas competition "Mobility concepts for an emission-free campus" for the universities in Baden-Württemberg. The aim is to make emission-free mobility concepts an integral part of the universities in the future. The initiative is embedded in the BW Automotive Industry Strategy Dialogue, in which innovation potential for the automotive industry is to be researched across industry boundaries. The state's Ministry of Science is providing a total of 3.15 million euros for this purpose. The concepts of the Universities of Stuttgart and Hohenheim, the Biberach University of Applied Sciences, the Baden-Württemberg Cooperative State University Stuttgart and the Stuttgart Technology University of Applied Sciences were awarded prizes.

=== Namibia Initiative ===
As a minister she was involved in reparations negotiations with the African nation of Namibia, which was colonised from 1884 to 1915 as German South West Africa. During a visit to Namibia in March 2019, Minister Bauer presented the "Witbooi Bible and Whip" which had been captured by German colonial troops in 1883 back to the community. She announced further initiatives by the state of Baden-Württemberg to ensure that German-Namibian history is not forgotten and that reconciliation takes place. "We want to work through our shared colonial history together and open a new chapter of cooperation today", she said on 27 February in Windhoek. This will include exchange programs and knowledge transfers as well as cooperation at university and archive level. New concepts for working through our shared history will also be developed. The goals of this project are to make the historical sources of the National Archives more accessible and to promote the exchange of knowledge between the countries. This apology to the ǀKhowesin clan was appreciated by Hendrik Witbooi's great-granddaughter Christina Frederick.

== Post-government career ==
On 21 March 2022, Bauer announced that she would run for mayor in Heidelberg on 6 November 2022. In this context, she resigned from her ministerial post. On 28 September 2022, Petra Olschowski was sworn in as her successor. She campaigned for mayor on a platform including affordable housing, accessible transport and climate change prevention. She was endorsed by the Heidelberg branch of Volt Germany.

In the election, Bauer received 28.6% of the vote in the first round. Since incumbent Eckart Würzner missed the absolute majority of the votes with 45.9%, a second round of voting took place on 27 November 2022. All candidates except Würzner, Bauer and the Die-PARTEI candidate withdrew. In the second round of voting, Bauer received 42.4% of the vote and was thus defeated by the incumbent mayor Würzner, who received 54% of the vote.

In June 2024, she became managing director of the Baden-Württemberg Foundation.

== Awards ==
After 2013, 2015 and 2016, she was named Science Minister of the Year by the German University Association (DHV) for the fourth time in 2022. In 2015, 2,480 (9.4%) of the 26,519 members of the DHV took part in the vote. Bauer was rated by 294 participants and received an overall score of 2.85. In 2016, she received an overall score of 2.62. She was certified as being willing to engage in dialogue, politically rational and "partially even excellent".

== Criticism ==
=== Ludwigsburg University affair ===
At the end of 2011, the former rector of the Ludwigsburg University of Public Administration granted 17 professors financial allowances on an illegal basis. In four cases, a legal basis for the allowance was subsequently found. Due to the so-called protection of legitimate expectations, the other 13 professors continued to receive the allowances. In this context, Theresia Bauer was accused of not having forwarded the matter to the public prosecutor's office or the Court of Auditors, and of not having sufficiently supported the subsequent rector, Claudia Stöckle, in the clean-up work. On 19 January 2017, the Social Democratic Party (SPD) and Free Democratic Party (FDP) parliamentary groups announced that they wanted to set up a committee of inquiry. Since 20 July 2017, the committee of inquiry has also been dealing with matters relating to the salaries of professors at the University of Applied Sciences for Technology, Business and Design (HTWG) in Konstanz.

As the affair continued, Claudia Stöckle was dismissed as rector by the ministry in 2015. In 2018, the Stuttgart Administrative Court ruled that the removal of Rector Stöckle was unlawful. The reasons for the judgment also state that the so-called Stratthaus Commission, which Bauer set up to clarify the situation, was by no means free and independent in the court's opinion. Rather, it was used and directed by the Ministry of Science in order to make Stöckle's replacement, which had initially failed, possible. This contradicts Bauer's representation to parliament, the university committees and the public. The opposition parties then applied for Minister Bauer's dismissal, but this was rejected in the state parliament.

=== Tuition fees for non-EU students ===
The step announced by Bauer in October 2016 to reintroduce tuition fees for non-EU students and second degree students met with widespread criticism from organisations and associations: Among those opposed to the proposal were student representatives, the German Student Union, the SPD and FDP parties, trade unions (GEW, DGB), the Action Alliance against Tuition Fees (ABS), the Federal Association of Foreign Students (BAS), the Free Association of Student Unions and the Umbrella Association for Development Policy Baden-Württemberg e. V. (DEAB).

After the introduction of tuition fees, one fifth fewer international students enrolled than in the previous year. Several students have filed a lawsuit against the fees before the administrative courts of Freiburg and Karlsruhe. However, according to the State Statistical Office, the number of international students rose again by 8.7% in the winter semester of 2018/19.

=== Relationship with the student body ===
As Minister for Science, Art and Culture, Theresia Bauer reintroduced the organized student body in Baden-Württemberg. Student representatives, however, criticized the minister's dealings with the student bodies: for example, the representatives only learned about the planned introduction of tuition fees for non-EU students and second degree students from the press. She defended this position as a cost saving measure. This approach was repeated with the planned cuts to the political mandate of the student body. The state student representation sees this as a "gross breach of trust" and is calling for the minister to resign.

== Memberships ==
- Senate of the Max Planck Society
- Senate of the Berlin-Brandenburg Academy of Sciences and Humanities

== Publications ==
- Politische Intelligenz? Ein Blick aus der Praxis zwischen Politik und Wissenschaft. In: Rainer M. Holm-Hadulla, Joachim Funke, Michael Wink (Hrsg.): Intelligenz: Theoretische Grundlagen und praktische Anwendungen. Heidelberg University Publishing, 2022, ISSN 2509-7822.
- Theorie – Praxis – und zurück. Als Politologin im Parlament. In: Matthias Catón, Julia Leininger, Philip Stöver, Claudia Ziller (Hrsg.): Politikwissenschaft im Beruf. Münster 2005, ISBN 978-3-8258-8360-7.
- Teilzeitbeschäftigung von Frauen im europäischen Vergleich am Beispiel Schwedens, Großbritanniens und der Bundesrepublik Deutschland. In: Ulla Kilchenmann (Hrsg.): Flexibel oder flexibilisiert? Chancen und Fallen der Teilzeitarbeit von Frauen. Zürich 1992, ISBN 978-3-905493-35-1.
- "Wir war'n die jüngste der Parteien". In: Winne Hermann, Wolfgang Schwegler-Rohmeis (Hrsg.): Grüner Weg durch schwarzes Land. Edition Erdmann, Stuttgart 1989, ISBN 3-522-62680-X.
