= Untersteller =

Untersteller is a surname. Notable people with the surname include:

- Franz Untersteller (born 1957), German politician
- Nicolas Untersteller (1900–1967), French painter
