= Sitzmann =

Sitzmann or Sitzman is a surname. Notable people with the surname include:

- Edith Sitzmann (born 1963), German politician
- Marilyn Sitzman (1939–1993), American receptionist and witness
- Travis Sitzmann (fl. 2024), American politician
