= Kretschmann cabinet =

Kretschmann cabinet may refer to:

- First Kretschmann cabinet, Baden-Württemberg state government 2011–2016
- Second Kretschmann cabinet, Baden-Württemberg state government 2016–2021
- Third Kretschmann cabinet, Baden-Württemberg state government 2021–2026
