= Franz Untersteller =

German politician

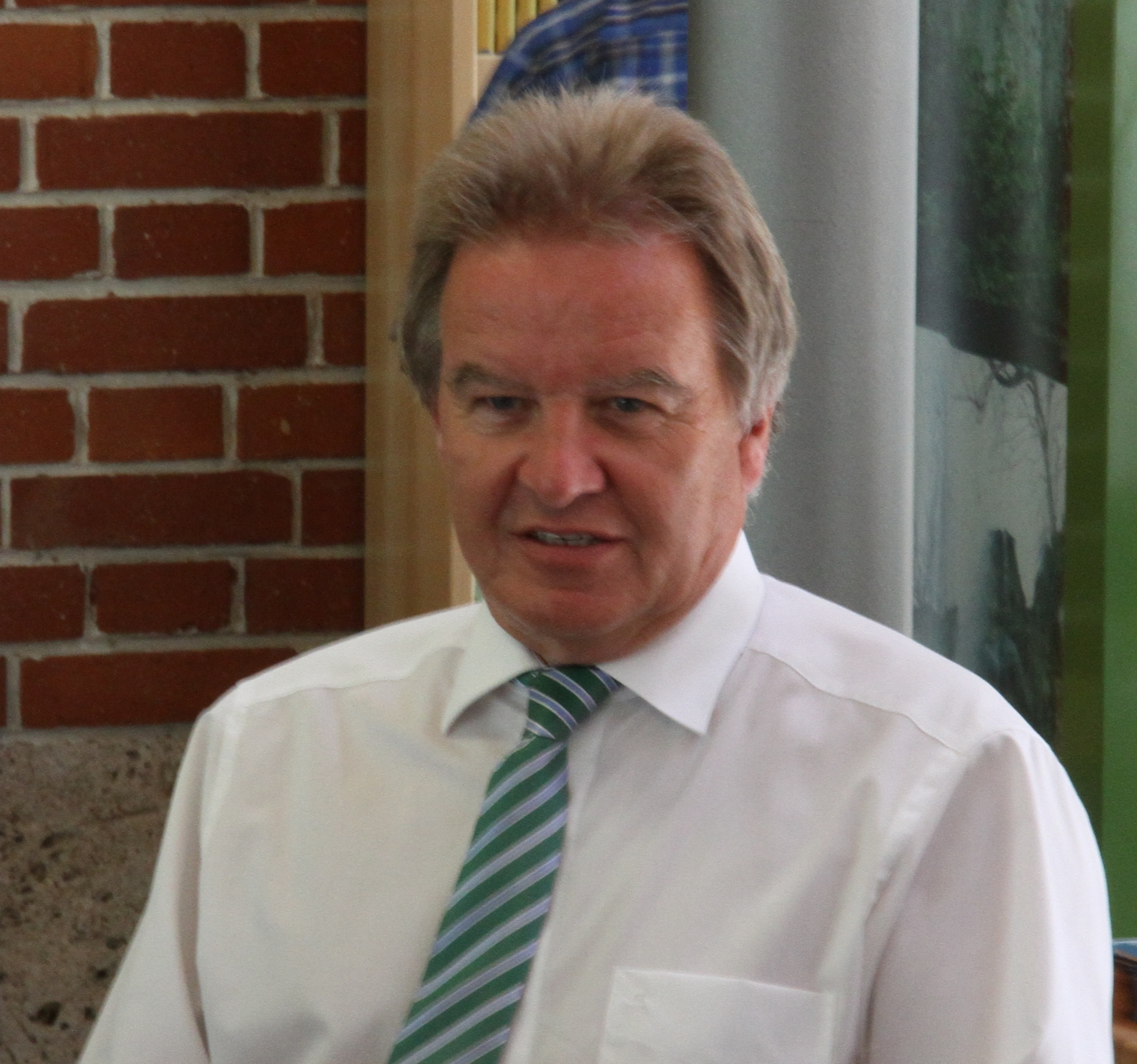
- Untersteller in 2015
- Born: April 4, 1957 (age 69); Ensheim, Saarbrücken, West Germany
- Occupations: Politician; Author
- Political party: Green Party
- Children: 2
- Website: Official website (in German)

Franz Untersteller (born 4 April 1957) is a German politician of the Green Party who has been serving as State Minister of the Environment, Climate and the Energy Sector of Baden-Württemberg in the Cabinets Kretschmann I and II since 2011.

== Early life and education ==
In 1977 Untersteller received his Abitur after having attended the commercial high school in Saarbrücken. Afterwards he studied Landscape Planning at the Nürtingen-Geislingen University of Applied Science and passed his Degree (Dipl. Ing.) in 1982.

== Early career ==
From 1981 till 1983 Untersteller worked at the Öko-Institut (Institute for Applied Ecology), Freiburg im Breisgau. In 1982 he took part in a project of the Colombia Environment Ministry in the Cauca region, funded by a research fellowship from the Carl Duisberg Society. In 1983 he became consultant on environmental and energy policy for the Green Party's parliamentary group in the Baden-Württemberg state parliament.

== Political career ==
In 2006 Untersteller was elected Member of the State Parliament and acted until 2011 as deputy chairman of the Green Party's parliamentary group. In May 2011 he was appointed as State Minister of the Environment, Climate Protection and Energy Sector in Baden-Württemberg. As one of his state's representatives at the Bundesrat, he serves on the Committee on the Environment, Nature Protection and Reactor Safety. From 2014 and 2016, he was one of the members of Germany's temporary National Commission on the Disposal of Radioactive Waste.

As member of the government Untersteller also acts as member of the several supervisory board of supervised enterprises or trading companies like the e-mobil BW GmbH or the State Bank of Baden-Württemberg (L-Bank).

In the negotiations to form another coalition government under Kretschmann's leadership following the 2021 state elections, Untersteller was a member of the working group on climate, environmental policy and energy, co-chaired by Sandra Detzer and Andreas Jung.

== Other activities ==
=== Regulatory agencies ===
- Federal Network Agency for Electricity, Gas, Telecommunications, Post and Railway (BNetzA), Member of the Advisory Board

=== Corporate boards ===
- L-Bank, Member of the Supervisory Board

=== Non-profit organizations ===
- Baden-Württemberg Stiftung, Ex-Officio Member of the Supervisory Board
- e-mobil BW GmbH, Ex-Officio Member of the Supervisory Board
- Plan International, Member
- German Ski Association (DSV), Member

== Personal life ==
Untersteller lives in Nürtingen. He is married and has two adult children. He is an active player and member of the board of the table tennis club TTF Neckarhausen e.V.
