= Bilkay Öney =

German politician (born 1970)

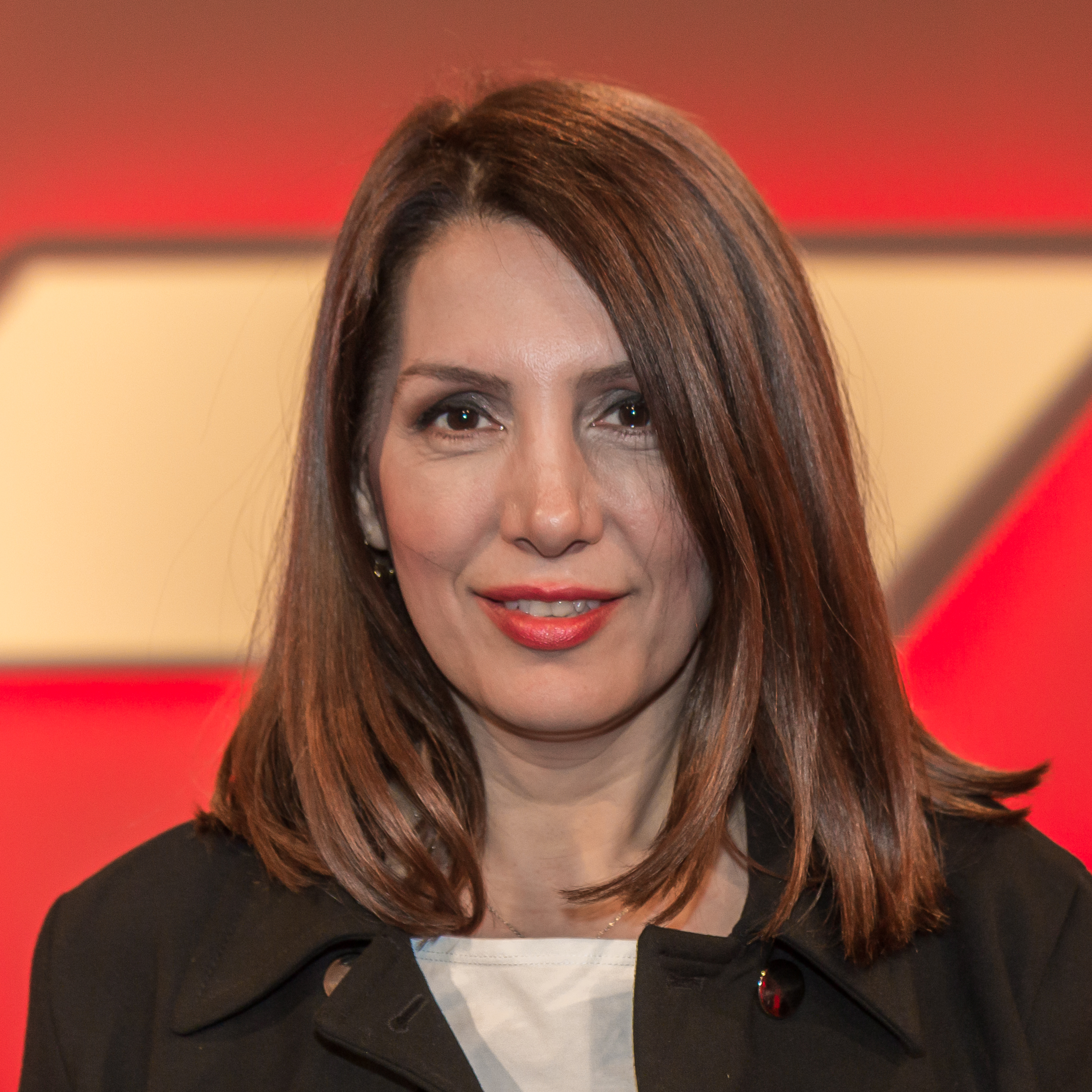
- Öney in 2017

Minister of Integration of Baden-Württemberg
- In office 12 May 2011 – 11 May 2016
- Minister-President: Winfried Kretschmann
- Succeeded by: Manfred Lucha

Personal details
- Born: 23 June 1970 (age 55) Malatya
- Party: Social Democratic Party (since 2009)

Bilkay Öney (formerly Kadem; born 23 June 1970 in Malatya) is a Turkish-born German politician. From 2011 to 2016, she served as minister of integration of Baden-Württemberg. From 2006 to 2011, she was a member of the Abgeordnetenhaus of Berlin.
