= Nils Schmid =

German lawyer and politician (born 1973)

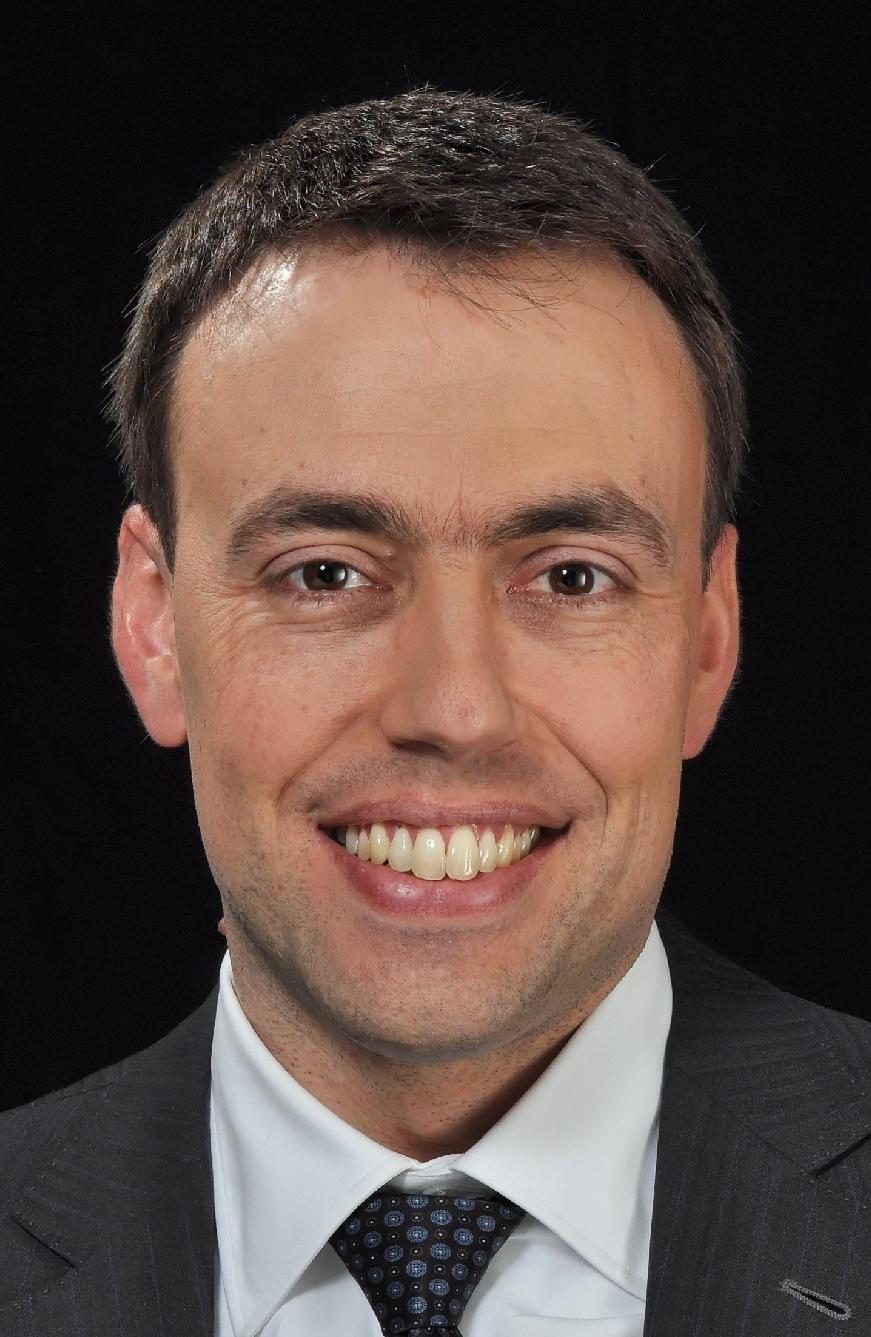
- Schmid in 2012

Member of the Bundestag
- Incumbent
- Assumed office 2017

Deputy Minister President of Baden-Württemberg
- In office 12 May 2011 – 11 May 2016
- Prime Minister: Winfried Kretschmann
- Preceded by: Ulrich Goll
- Succeeded by: Thomas Strobl

Minister of Finance and Economics of Baden-Württemberg
- In office 12 May 2011 – 11 May 2016
- Prime Minister: Winfried Kretschmann
- Preceded by: Office established
- Succeeded by: Office abolished

Personal details
- Born: 11 July 1973 (age 53) Trier, West Germany
- Party: Social Democratic Party
- Education: University of Tübingen
- Occupation: Lawyer; politician

Nils Schmid (born 11 July 1973) is a German lawyer and politician of the Social Democratic Party (SPD) has been a member of the German Bundestag since 2017.

In addition to his parliamentary work, Schmid has been serving as a Parliamentary State Secretary at the Federal Ministry of Defence in the government of Chancellor Friedrich Merz since 2025. From 2018 to 2025, he was the SPD parliamentary group's spokesperson for foreign affairs.

== Early life and education ==
After his Abitur at Eduard Spranger School, Filderstadt, in 1993, Schmid studied law at the University of Tübingen. He worked as a lawyer, and in 2006 he received his doctorate (summa cum laude) (under the supervision of Ferdinand Kirchhof) from Tübingen University. But then he gave up his professional career in favour of politics.

== Political career ==
=== Career in state politics ===
Schmid joined the Social Democratic Party of Germany in 1991; and in 1993, he was already elected chairman of the Esslingen district of the Young Socialists in the SPD, becoming deputy chairman of the Young Socialists of Baden-Württemberg in 1996.

In the 1996 state elections Schmid became a member of the State Parliament of Baden-Württemberg. There he gradually developed into his party's main speaker on financial affairs. He was elected deputy leader of his parliamentary group.

In 2009, Schmid succeeded Ute Vogt and became the leader of his party in Baden-Württemberg after winning an internal poll among its members. Together with Barbara Hendricks, Hannelore Kraft, Heiko Maas and Manuela Schwesig, he co-chaired the SPD's 2010 national convention in Berlin.

=== Deputy Minister-President, 2011–2016 ===
After the 2011 state elections, lying only one parliamental seat behind the Greens, Schmid became Deputy Minister-President as well as Minister of Financial and Economic Affairs in the government of Minister-President Winfried Kretschmann of Baden-Württemberg. In this capacity, he was also a member of the German-French Friendship Group set up by the German Bundesrat and the French Senate as well as of the German-Russian Friendship Group set up in cooperation with the Russian Federation Council.

In the negotiations to form a grand coalition following the 2013 federal elections, Schmid was part of the SPD delegation in the working group on economic policy, led by Ilse Aigner and Hubertus Heil.

Following his party's loss in the 2016 state elections, Schmid's term in government ended in May 2016; he was succeeded by Nicole Hoffmeister-Kraut. Later that year, he announced that he would run in the 2017 national elections.

=== Member of the German Bundestag, 2017–present ===
Schmid has been a member of the German Bundestag since September 2017, representing Nürtingen. He serves on the Committee on Foreign Affairs, where he is the SPD parliamentary group's spokesperson. Since 2019, he has been a member of the German delegation to the Franco-German Parliamentary Assembly.

In the negotiations to form a so-called traffic light coalition of the SPD, the Green Party and the Free Democratic Party (FDP) following the 2021 federal elections, Schmid was part of his party's delegation in the working group on foreign policy, defence, development cooperation and human rights, co-chaired by Heiko Maas, Omid Nouripour and Alexander Graf Lambsdorff. In the negotiations to form a Grand Coalition under the leadership of Friedrich Merz's Christian Democrats (CDU together with the Bavarian CSU) and the SPD following the 2025 German elections, she was again part of the SPD delegation in the working group on foreign affairs, defense, development cooperation and human rights, this time led by Johann Wadephul, Florian Hahn and Svenja Schulze.

== Other activities ==
=== Corporate boards ===
- Baden-Württemberg International, Ex-Officio Chairman of the Supervisory Board (2011–2016)
- L-Bank, Ex-Officio Chairman of the Supervisory Board (2011–2016)
- Landesbank Baden-Württemberg, Deputy Chairman of the Supervisory Board (2011–2016)
- EnBW, Member of the Supervisory Board (2011–2016)
- KfW, Member of the Supervisory Board (2011–2016)

=== Non-profit organisations ===
- Business Forum of the Social Democratic Party of Germany, Member of the Political Advisory Board (since 2018)
- German Council on Foreign Relations (DGAP), Member of the Presidium (since 2018)
- German Institute for International and Security Affairs (SWP), Member of the Council (since 2018)
- Centre for East European and International Studies (ZOiS), Member of the Board of Trustees (since 2018)
- Franco-German Institute (DFI), Member of the Board
- Friedrich Ebert Foundation (FES), Member
- Carlo Schmid Foundation, chairman of the Board of Trustees
- Phi Delta Phi – Richard von Weizsäcker Inn Tübingen, Honorary Member
- Vereinigung Baden-Württembergische Wertpapierbörse, Member of the Board of Trustees
- Turkey: Culture of Change Initiative (TCCI), Member of the Advisory Board
- Baden-Württemberg Stiftung, Member of the Supervisory Board (2011–2016)
- Kunststiftung Baden-Württemberg, Member of the Board of Trustees (2003–2011)
- Akademie Schloss Solitude, Member of the Board of Trustees (2007–2011)
