= Trikont-Verlag =

German publishing house

The leftist publishing house Trikont was founded in 1967 in Munich by Gisela Erler and others. The record label has its origins in the protest and alternative movements of the 1970s and derived its name from geographical concept 'Trikont', which refers to the three continents Asia, Africa and South-America. On July 20, 2010, Christine Dombrowsky died at the age of only 59. Shortly before her death, she handed over the archive to the "Archive of the Munich Workers' Movement".

== See also ==
- List of record labels
