= Petra Olschowski =

German politician (born 1965)

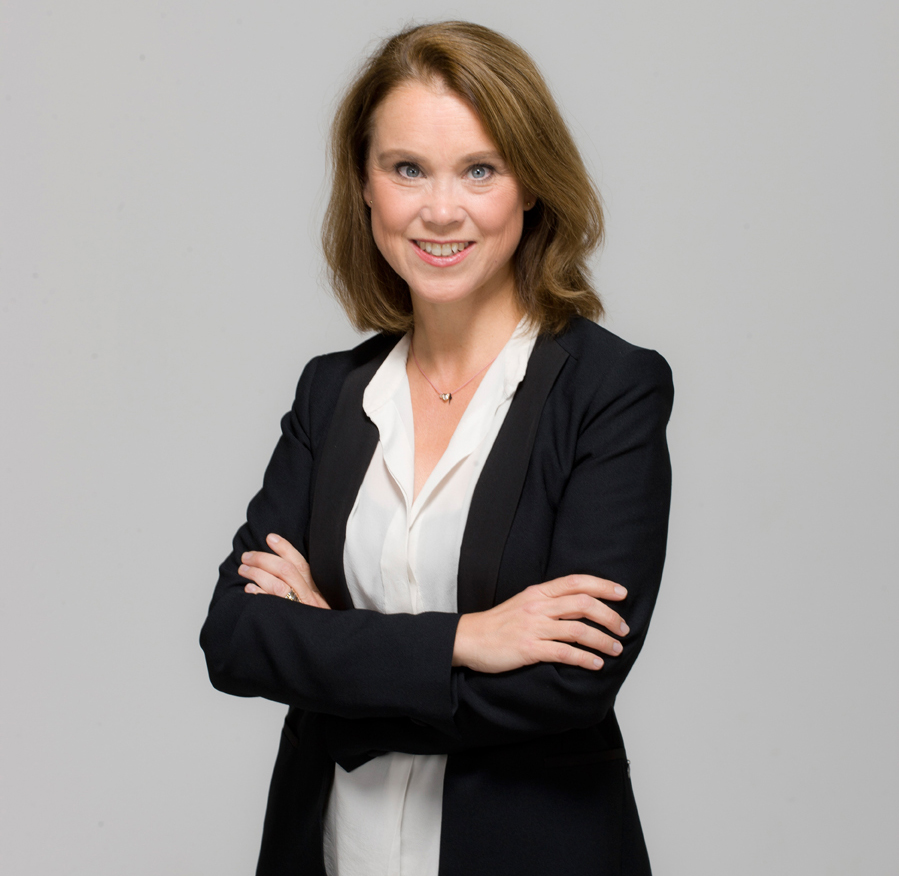
- Olschowski in 2013

Minister of Science, Research and Arts of Baden-Württemberg
- Incumbent
- Assumed office 28 September 2022
- Minister-President: Winfried Kretschmann; Cem Özdemir
- Preceded by: Theresia Bauer

Personal details
- Born: 29 June 1965 (age 61)
- Party: Alliance 90/The Greens

Petra Olschowski (born 29 June 1965) is a German politician of Alliance 90/The Greens who has been serving as State Minister of Science, Research and the Arts of Baden-Württemberg in Özdemir cabinet since 2022. She has been a member of the Landtag of Baden-Württemberg since 2021.

== Early career ==
From 2010 to 2016, Olschowski served as rector of the State Academy of Fine Arts Stuttgart.

== Political career ==
In the negotiations to form a coalition government under the leadership of Cem Özdemir following the 2026 state elections in Baden-Württemberg, Olschowski co-chaired the working group on science, research and arts, alongside Alexander Becker.
