= Nicole Hoffmeister-Kraut =

German politician (born 1972)

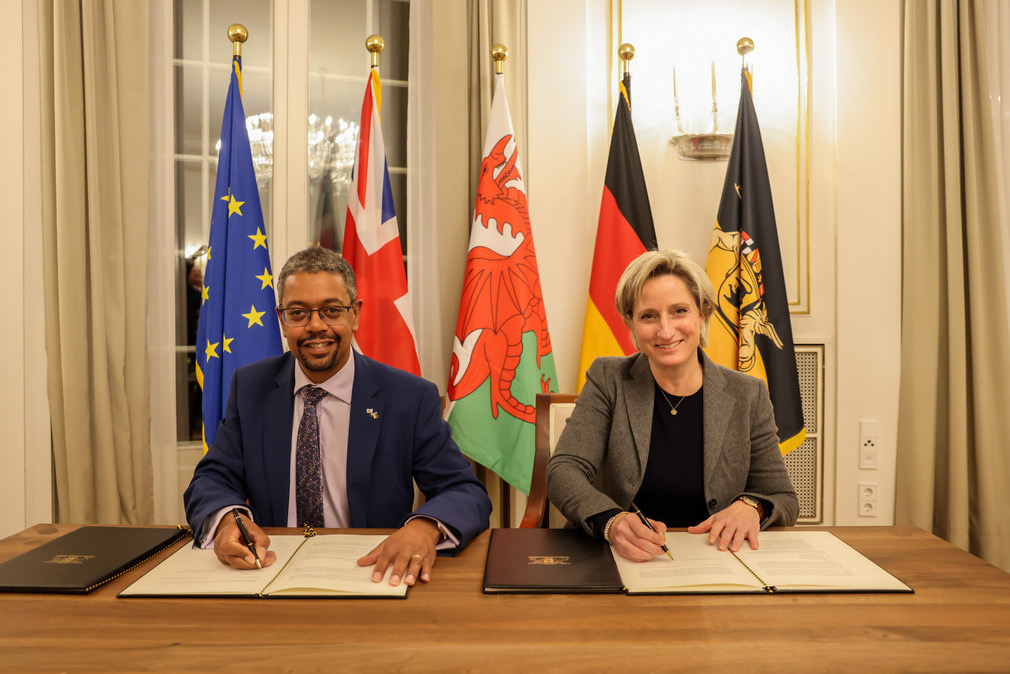
- Hoffmeister-Kraut in 2023

Minister for Economic Affairs, Labour and Tourism of Baden-Württemberg
- Incumbent
- Assumed office 12 May 2021
- Minister-President: Winfried Kretschmann

Personal details
- Born: 9 October 1972 (age 53) Balingen
- Party: Christian Democratic Union (since 2009)

Nicole Hoffmeister-Kraut (born 9 October 1972 in Balingen) is a German politician serving as minister of economic affairs, labour and tourism of Baden-Württemberg since 2021. From 2016 to 2021, she served as minister of economic affairs, labour and housing. She has been a member of the Landtag of Baden-Württemberg since 2016.
