= 2016 Baden-Württemberg state election =

State election in Germany

← 2011	13 March 2016	2021 →

All 143 seats in the Landtag of Baden-Württemberg 72 seats needed for a majority
- Turnout: 5,412,301 (70.4%) ▲4.2%
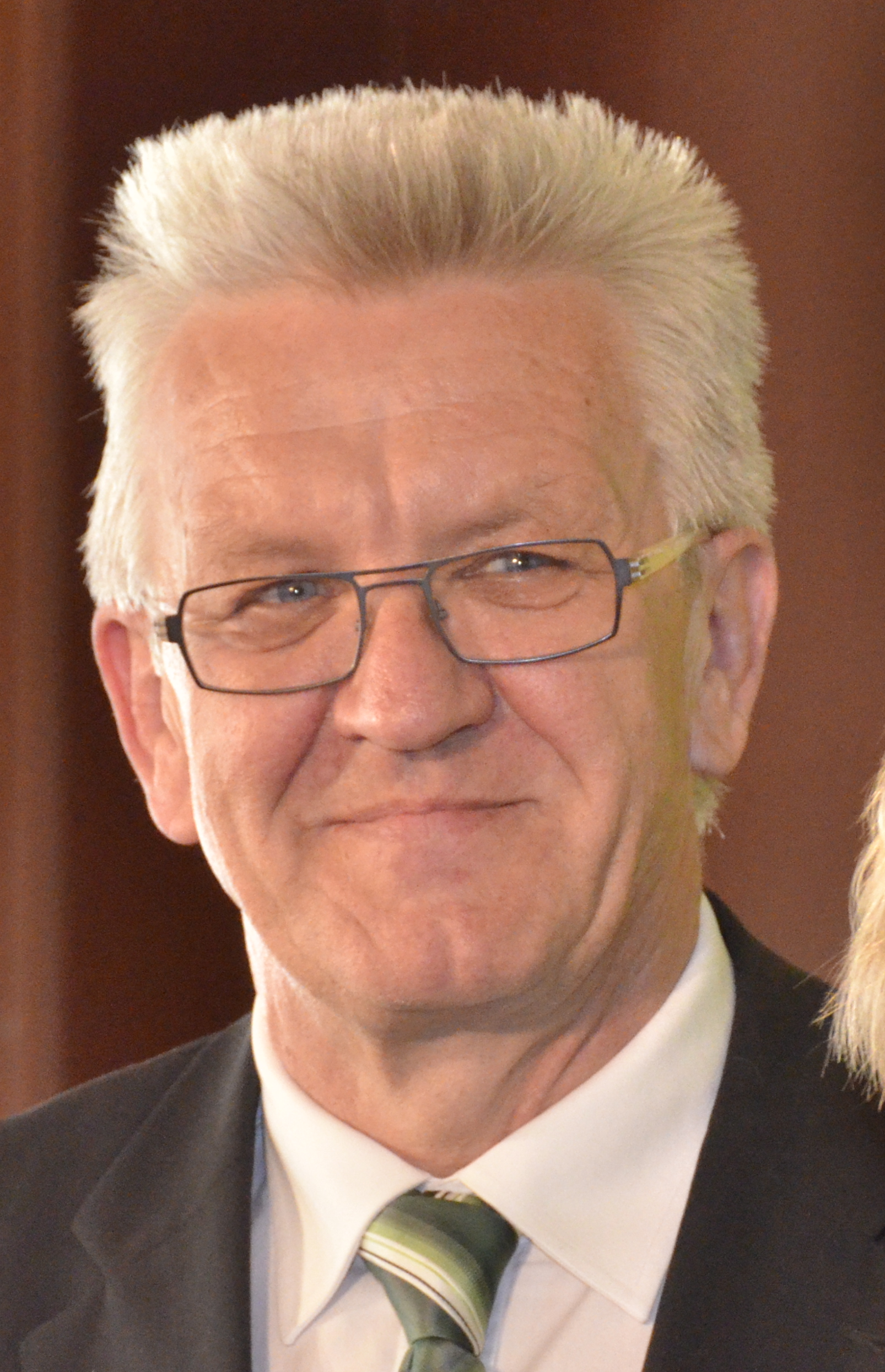

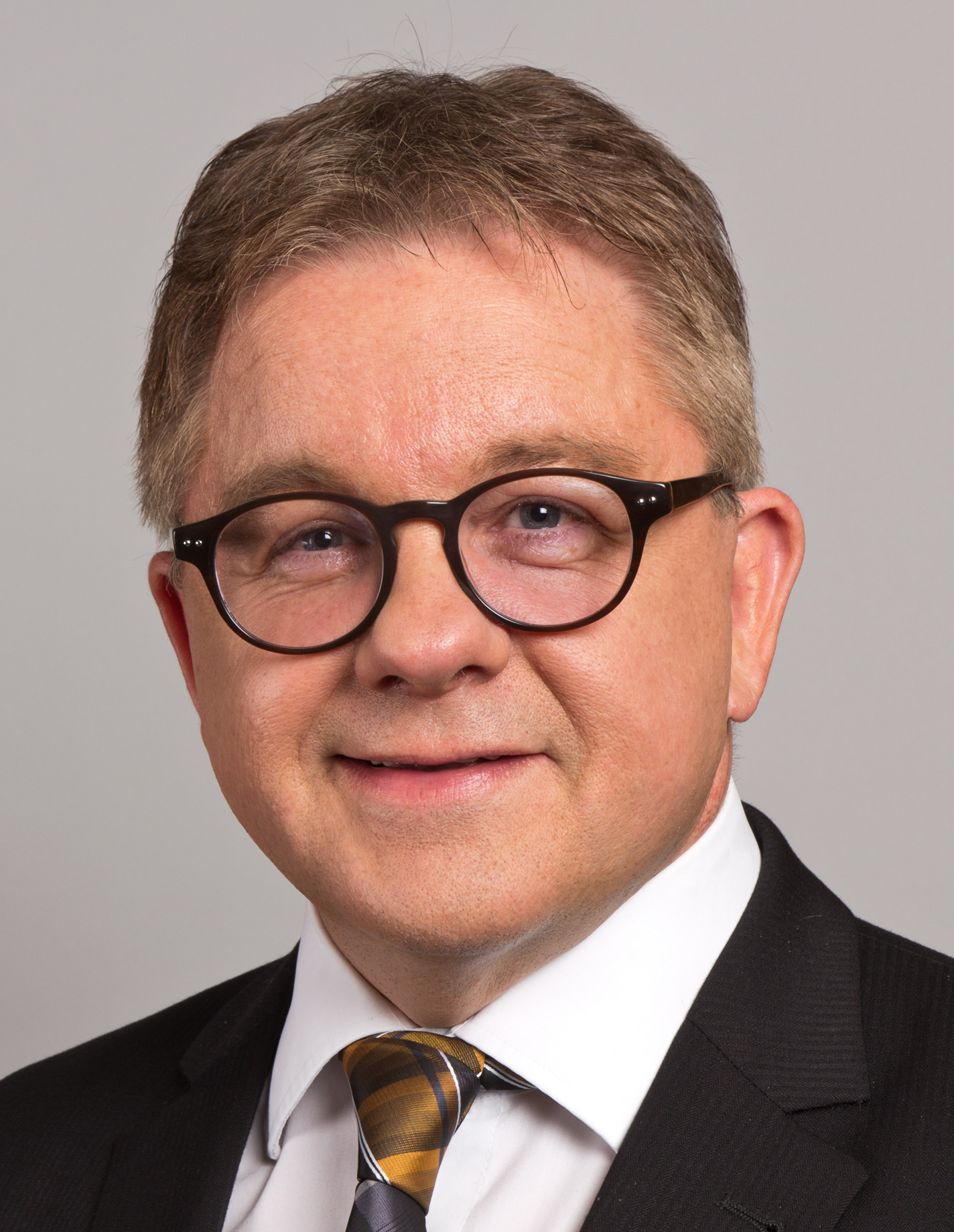

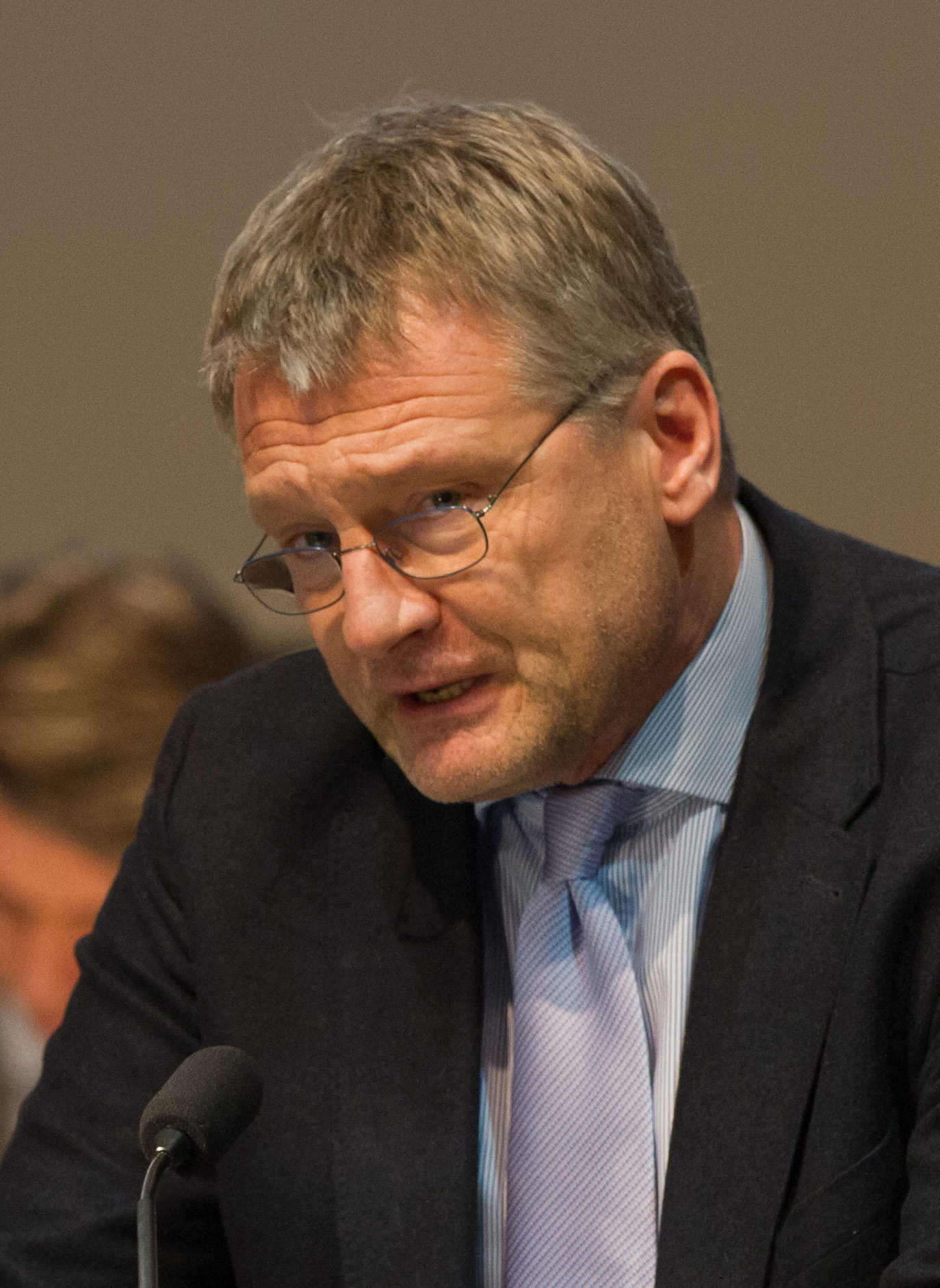

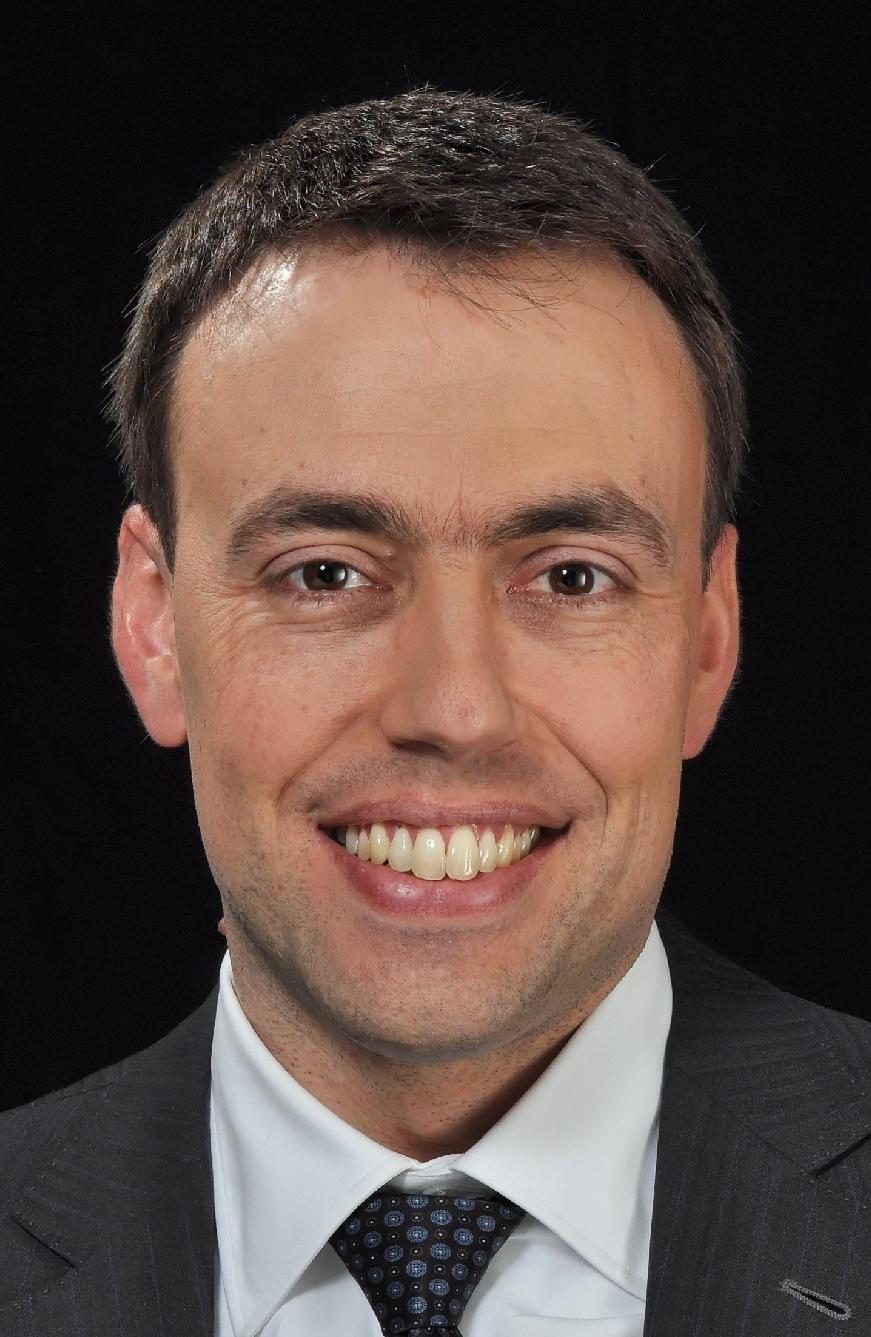

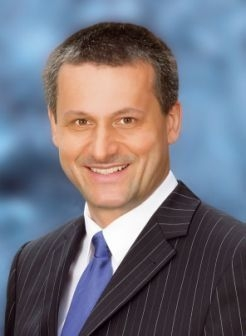

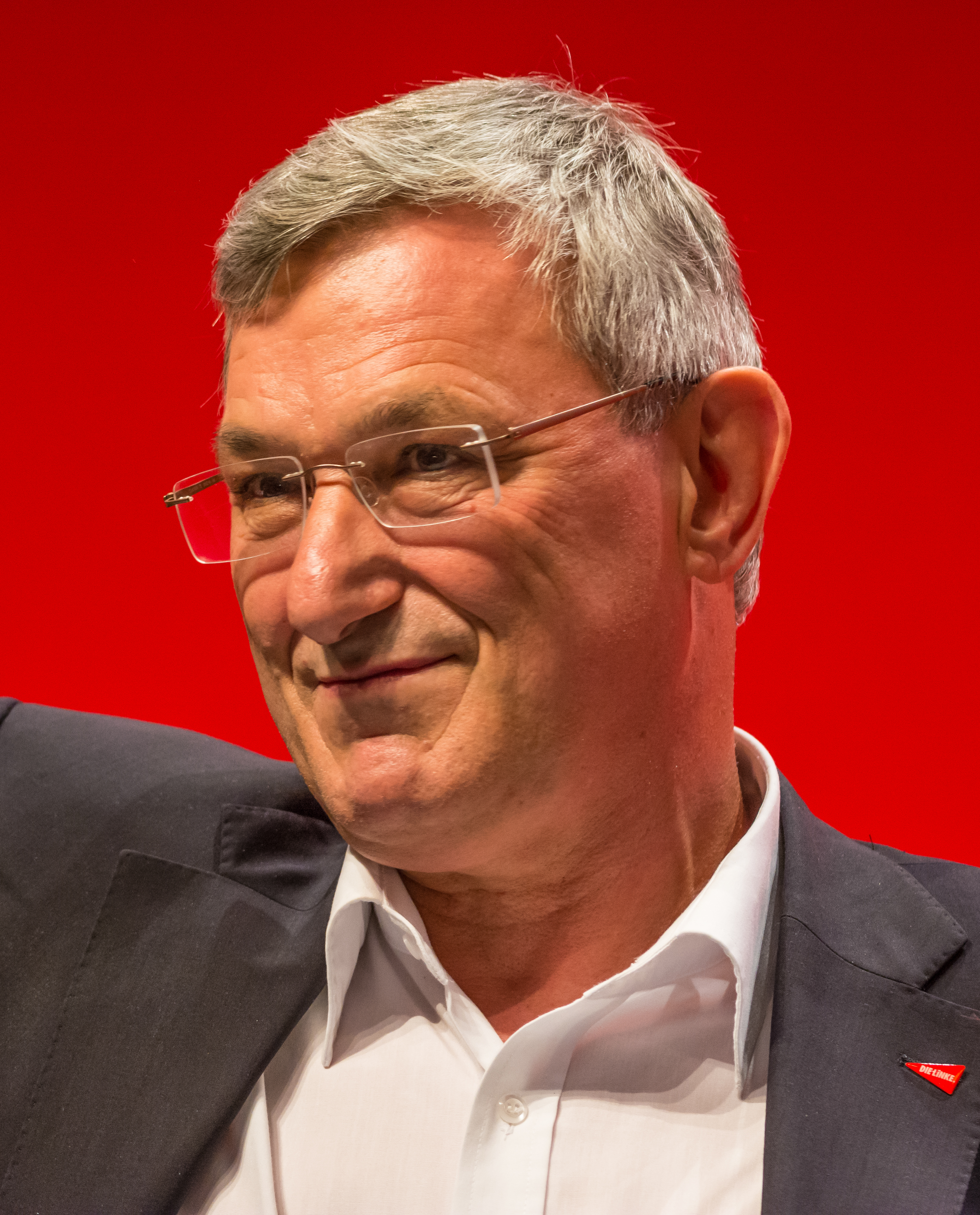
	First party	Second party	Third party
Leader	Winfried Kretschmann	Guido Wolf	Jörg Meuthen
Party	Greens	CDU	AfD
Last election	36 seats, 24.1%	60 seats, 39.0%	Did not exist
Seats won	47	42	23
Seat change	▲11	▼18	▲23
Popular vote	1,622,631	1,447,249	809,311
Percentage	30.3%	27.0%	15.1%
Swing	▲6.1%	▼12.0%	New party
	Fourth party	Fifth party	Sixth party
Leader	Nils Schmid	Hans-Ulrich Rülke	Bernd Riexinger
Party	SPD	FDP	Left
Last election	35 seats, 23.1%	7 seats, 5.3%	0 seats, 2.8%
Seats won	19	12	0
Seat change	▼16	▲5	0
Popular vote	679,872	445,430	156,211
Percentage	12.7%	8.3%	2.9%
Swing	▼10.4%	▲3.0%	▲0.1%
- Results for the single-member constituencies.
Minister-President before election
Winfried Kretschmann
Greens
Minister-President
Winfried Kretschmann
Greens

The 2016 Baden-Württemberg state election to elect the members of the 15th Landtag of Baden-Württemberg was held on 13 March 2016, the same day as the Rhineland-Palatinate state election and Saxony-Anhalt state election. The incumbent government of The Greens and the Social Democratic Party (SPD) led by Minister-President Winfried Kretschmann lost its majority, but Kretschmann and the Greens would gain support from the CDU and went on to rule for another 10 years.

The Greens achieved a 6% swing and became the largest party in a state legislature for the first time. The Christian Democratic Union (CDU), which had previously been by far the largest party, lost a third of its voteshare and fell to second place. The new Alternative for Germany (AfD) contested its first state election in Baden-Württemberg, debuting at 15% as the leading opposition party. The SPD lost half its voteshare and fell to fourth place with 12.7%.

After the election, the Greens formed a coalition with the CDU, and Kretschmann was re-elected as Minister-President.

== Campaign and issues ==
The Greens campaigned to keep Minister-President Winfried Kretschmann in office. Their central issues were energy, economics, and education. The CDU aimed to put an end to the green-red state government and usher in its own leading candidate Guido Wolf to head the state government. Themes in focus for the CDU were education policy, internal security, and the issue of infrastructure, including high-speed internet. The SPD, led by Nils Schmid, wanted to win more votes to continue the existing government coalition with The Greens. The SPD's campaign mainly focused on "good jobs", educational equality, and more time for the family. The electoral goal of the FDP, led by Hans-Ulrich Rülke, was to repeat its entry into the state parliament and possibly be involved in a governing coalition. They promised better education, the strengthening of the local business, and improvement of mobility. The AfD party campaigned to be elected into the state parliament for the first time. Its leading candidate Jörg Meuthen saw migration policy as an important election issue, alongside education, security, and energy transition.

The election campaign was overshadowed by the European migrant crisis. In the crisis, Kretschmann supported the policies of Chancellor Angela Merkel. Kretschmann said he saw no other person who could keep Europe together as Angela Merkel did. "Therefore, I pray every day that the Chancellor remains healthy." CDU candidate Wolf also emphasized support for Merkel's "European solution" in the crisis, but in February 2016 tried to win more conservative voters by a joint proposal along with Rhineland-Palatinate CDU candidate Julia Klöckner for daily refugee quotas and border centers for migrants, which put additional pressure on Merkel.

== Parties ==
The table below lists parties represented in the previous Landtag of Baden-Württemberg.

Name		Ideology	Leader(s)	2011 result	
Name		Ideology	Leader(s)	Votes (%)	Seats
CDU	Christian Democratic Union of Germany; Christlich Demokratische Union Deutschlands	Christian democracy	Guido Wolf	39.0%	60 / 138
Grüne	Alliance 90/The Greens; Bündnis 90/Die Grünen	Green politics	Winfried Kretschmann	24.2%	36 / 138
SPD	Social Democratic Party of Germany; Sozialdemokratische Partei Deutschlands	Social democracy	Nils Schmid	23.1%	35 / 138
FDP	Free Democratic Party; Freie Demokratische Partei	Classical liberalism	Hans-Ulrich Rülke	5.3%	7 / 138

== Opinion polls ==
Graph of opinion polls conducted, trendlines are local regressions (LOESS)

Key

Green
CDU
SPD
AfD
FDP
Left
Pirates

Polling firm	Fieldwork date	Sample size	CDU	Grüne	SPD	FDP	Linke	Piraten	AfD	Others	Lead
2016 state election	13 Mar 2016	–	27.0	30.3	12.7	8.3	2.9	0.4	15.1	3.3	3.3
Forschungsgruppe Wahlen	7–10 Mar 2016	1,711	29	32	14	6	4	–	11	4	3
YouGov	2–9 Mar 2016	974	30	32	12	8	4	–	11	3	2
Forsa	2–8 Mar 2016	1,002	27	32	16	7	3	–	11	4	5
INSA	1–5 Mar 2016	1,005	28.5	33.5	12.5	6.0	3.0	–	12.5	4.0	5.0
Forschungsgruppe Wahlen	29 Feb–3 Mar 2016	1,058	30	32	13	7	4	–	11	3	2
Infratest dimap	29 Feb–2 Mar 2016	1,002	28	32	13	8	4	–	13	2	4
INSA	25–27 Feb 2016	1,030	30.0	30.5	16.5	6.5	3.5	–	9.0	4.0	0.5
Forsa	16–22 Feb 2016	1,069	30	30	16	6	3	–	11	4	Tie
INSA	19–20 Feb 2016	1,000	30.0	30.5	16.0	7.0	3.0	–	10.0	3.5	0.5
Infratest dimap	11–16 Feb 2016	1,000	31	28	14	8	4	–	12	3	3
Customer Research 42	27 Jan–7 Feb 2016	1,000	33.1	26.1	15.6	5.1	5.5	–	10.5	4.1	7.0
INSA	26 Jan–1 Feb 2016	1,000	33.5	28.5	13.5	7.0	3.5	–	10.0	4.0	5.0
Forschungsgruppe Wahlen	18–20 Jan 2016	1,069	34	28	15	6	3	–	11	3	6
INSA	11–18 Jan 2016	1,000	35	29	13	6.5	2.5	–	11.5	2.5	6
Infratest dimap	7–12 Jan 2016	1,000	35	28	15	6	3	–	10	3	7
Forsa	2–11 Dec 2015	1,064	35	28	19	5	3	–	7	3	7
Infratest dimap	26 Nov–1 Dec 2015	1,000	37	25	18	5	4	–	8	3	12
Forschungsgruppe Wahlen	16–18 Nov 2015	1,040	37	27	18	5	3	–	6	4	10
INSA	24 Sep–6 Oct 2015	1,003	40	24	16	5	5	–	8	2	16
Infratest dimap	17–22 Sep 2015	1,000	39	26	17	5	4	–	5	4	13
Allensbach	18 Jul–12 Aug 2015	1,047	40.5	24.0	20.0	4.5	4.0	–	3.0	4.0	16.5
Forsa	23 Apr–7 May 2015	1,010	38	26	20	4	4	–	4	4	12
Infratest dimap	19–24 Mar 2015	1,000	38	25	18	5	5	–	4	5	13
Infratest dimap	10–11 Nov 2014	1,000	41	22	20	3	4	–	5	5	19
TNS Infratest	17 Sep 2014	–	41	23	19	4	4	–	4	5	18
2014 European election	25 May 2014	–	39.3	13.2	23.0	4.1	3.6	1.2	7.9	7.7	16.3
Infratest dimap	6–11 May 2014	1,000	41	21	20	3	4	–	6	5	20
Infratest dimap	4–5 Nov 2013	1,004	43	22	19	4	4	–	5	3	21
2013 federal election	22 Sep 2013	–	45.7	11.0	20.6	6.2	4.8	2.3	5.2	4.2	25.1
Infratest dimap	13–15 May 2013	1,005	39	28	19	4	2	3	2	3	11
Infratest dimap	7–8 May 2012	1,000	37	28	21	4	2	6	–	2	9
Emnid	15–17 Nov 2011	1,002	34	32	20	4	3	4	–	3	2
Infratest dimap	8–16 Nov 2011	2,403	37	29	22	3	2	4	–	3	8
Infratest dimap	16–17 Aug 2011	1,000	36	29	23	4	3	–	–	5	7
Forsa	18–29 Apr 2011	1,004	36	30	22	4	2	–	–	6	6
2011 state election	27 Mar 2011	–	39.0	24.2	23.1	5.3	2.8	2.1	–	3.5	14.8

== Results ==
< 2011 > 2021

Summary of the 13 March 2016 Landtag of Baden-Württemberg elections results
Party	Popular vote			Seats	
Party	Votes	%	+/–	Seats	+/–
Alliance '90/The Greens; Bündnis 90/Die Grünen	1,622,631	30.3	▲6.1	47	▲11
Christian Democratic Union; Christlich Demokratische Union Deutschlands – CDU	1,447,249	27.0	▼12.0	42	▼18
Alternative for Germany; Alternative für Deutschland – AfD	809,311	15.1	▲15.1	23	▲23
Social Democratic Party; Sozialdemokratische Partei Deutschlands – SPD	679,872	12.7	▼10.4	19	▼16
Free Democratic Party; Freie Demokratische Partei – FDP	445,430	8.3	▲3.0	12	▲5
Left Party; Die Linke	156,211	2.9	▲0.1	0	
Alliance for Progress and Renewal; Allianz für Fortschritt und Aufbruch – ALFA	54,764	1.0	▲1.0	0	
Ecological Democratic Party; Ökologisch-Demokratische Partei – ÖDP	38,509	0.7	▼0.2	0	
National Democratic Party; Nationaldemokratische Partei Deutschlands – NPD	23,605	0.4	▼0.6	0	
Pirate Party; Piratenpartei	21,773	0.4	▼0.6	0	
Other parties					
Valid votes	5,360,351	99.0	▲0.4		
Invalid votes	51,950	1.0	▼0.4		
Totals and voter turnout	5,412,301	70.4	▲4.2	143	▲5
Electorate	7,685,778	100.00	—		
Source: Landeswahlleiter

Popular vote
GRÜNE	30.27%
CDU	27.00%
AfD	15.10%
SPD	12.68%
FDP	8.31%
LINKE	2.91%
ALFA	1.02%
Other	1.56%

Landtag seats
GRÜNE	32.87%
CDU	29.37%
AfD	16.08%
SPD	13.29%
FDP	8.39%

== Aftermath ==
In the prior election of 2011, the Green/SPD coalition obtained a majority (73 of 138) of votes in the Landtag, including two opposition votes; however after the 2016 vote, the coalition fell short of a majority, with a combined total of 66 seats (72 needed for a majority). Kretschmann's popularity propelled the Green Party to a gain of 11 seats, making history as the first time the Green party has been the largest party in State-level election results. However, the Greens' coalition partner, the SPD, lost 16 seats, thus depriving the Greens' of a clear majority of leftists.

There were several possible and probable working majorities among the five parties in the Landtag. Expanding the existing coalition into a three-party "traffic light" coalition (green-red-yellow) by including the FDP would have given the administration a working majority of 6. However, it was ruled out by FDP. Coalitions with AfD appeared unlikely: a CDU-AfD coalition would be 7 short of a majority in the Landtag, so would have also needed to include the FDP to make a majority and remove Kretschmann as minister-president. Removal of Kretschmann was unlikely; CDU leader Guido Wolf briefly sought to get the Social Democrats into a right-of-centre coalition with the FDP (with Wolf as state minister-president), but his SPD counterpart Nils Schmid pointed out that such a coalition would frustrate voters due to the personal popularity of Kretschmann. If it were possible to elect the minister-president directly, Kretschmann would have won an outright majority according to polls; he was even favored by 45% of CDU supporters.

In May 2016, the Landtag confirmed Kretschmann's leadership in a secret ballot. He won 82 votes leading a "green-black" coalition with a nominal majority of 89 Landestag members (Green 47, CDU 42). A similar "black-green" coalition headed by the CDU has governed in Hesse since the similarly indecisive 2013 elections, but this is the first time the Green Party is the lead coalition partner in a coalition with the CDU (previously, they led a coalition with the SPD). Kretschmann formed the Cabinet Kretschmann II as the state government.
