= Gisela Erler =

German researcher, feminist, entrepreneur and politician (born 1946)

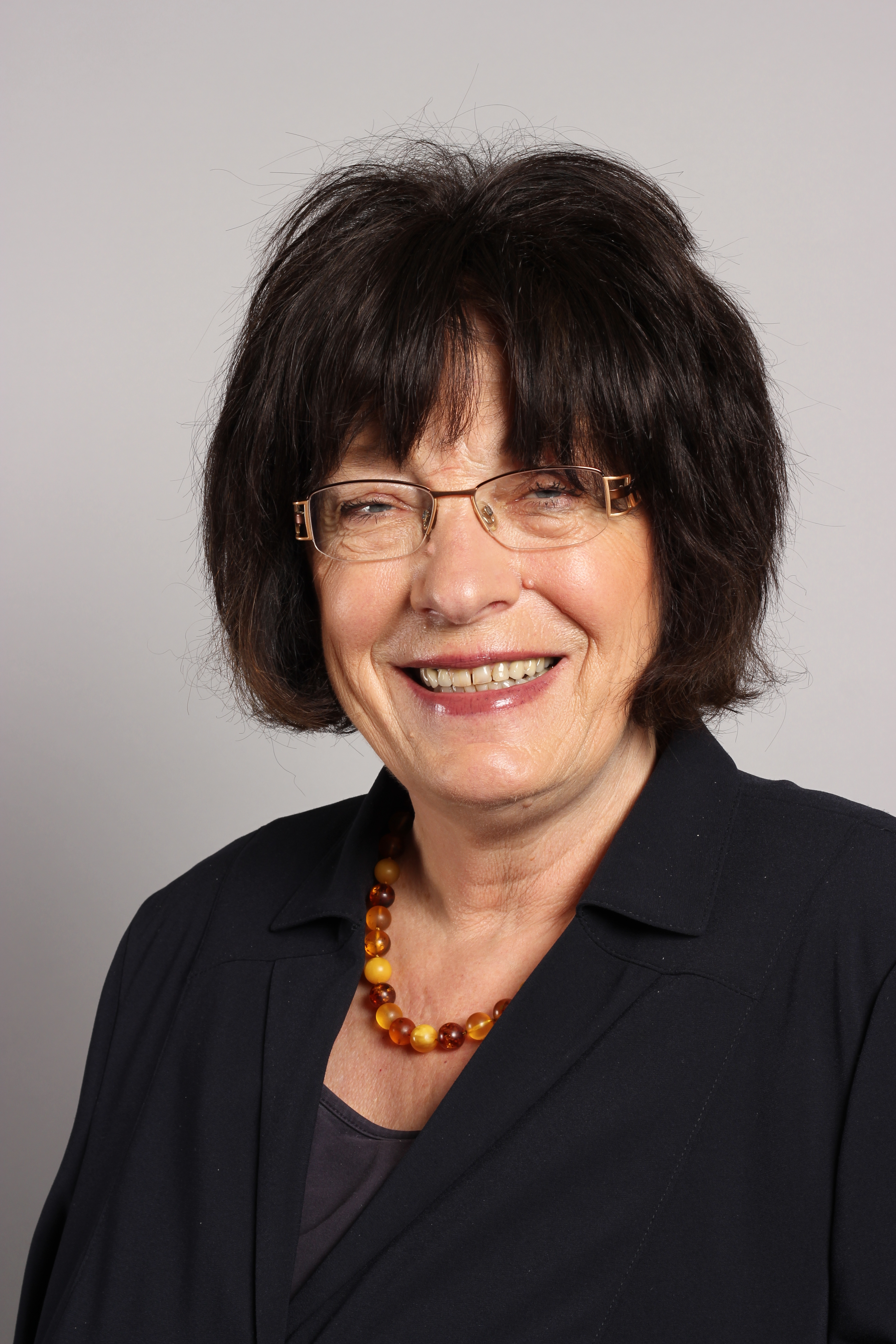

Baden-Württemberg state councillor for Civil Society and Citizen Participation
- In office 2011–2021
- Succeeded by: Barbara Bosch.

Personal details
- Born: 9 May 1946 (age 80) Biberach an der Riss, Baden-Württemberg, West Germany
- Party: Green Party
- Spouse: Warnfried Dettling
- Occupation: Politician

Gisela Erler (born 9 May 1946) is a German researcher, feminist, entrepreneur and politician, who is a member of the Green Party. She is credited with playing a role in the development of family benefits in Germany, such as parental allowance and the right to a day-care place for children. From 2011 to 2021 she was a member of the state government of Baden-Württemberg, with responsibility for "Civil Society and Citizen Participation".

== Early life ==
Gisela Anna Erler was born on 9 May 1946 in Biberach an der Riss in the state of Baden-Württemberg. She is the daughter of Fritz Erler, who was a member of the German Social Democratic Party (SPD), was imprisoned by the Nazis during World War II, and in 1964 became the deputy chairman of the SPD when Willy Brandt was chairman. She spent her childhood in Tuttlingen and Pforzheim, both in Baden-Württemberg.

Erler studied German, linguistics and sociology in Cologne and Munich where she was involved in the Sozialistische Deutsche Studentenbund (SDS), the student wing of the SPD. In 1967 she co-founded the left-wing publishing house, Trikont-Verlag, and in 1974 the feminist publisher Frauenoffensive, both based in Munich. She was prosecuted for publishing the autobiography of Bommi Baumann, a left-wing terrorist, eventually being acquitted.

== Career ==
After graduating in 1974, Erler worked with the German Youth Institute in Munich, studying the link between gender roles, careers and the family. The focus of her research was on developing new models for working hours, with the research being carried out with local businesses. After a research visit to the US to look at approaches to work-life balance, she authored an international comparative study on parental leave and on steps to re-organize working time. In a study lasting several years, she followed a project on childminders. Third-party childcare for children under the age of three was highly controversial in West Germany at the time, and the concept of childminders was still fairly unknown. Her findings found that children with childminders showed no developmental deficits and, in fact, were less socially inhibited and anxious than children who stay at home with their mothers.

Erler joined the Green Party in 1983 after the Greens entered the German Bundestag for the first time. She was part of what were regarded as the market-oriented "eco-libertarian Greens". In 1987, together with a dozen other women associated with the Greens, she published the Mothers´Manifest with the aim of changing living conditions in the Federal Republic of Germany in favour of people who live with children. This triggered heated discussions. In the same year, together with Doro Pass-Weingartz she published a pamphlet called Mütter an die Macht (Mothers to Power).

In 1989 Erler took part in a talk show on the German TV and radio station, Südwestrundfunk. She explained that her two sons, then 10 and 13, did not live with her but with their father, from whom she had separated. She lived with her sons, and their father, in their former home for about one week a month and the rest of the time she was with her new partner, who would become her husband. She would help her sons with their homework by fax. She was criticised for being a bad mother. This was not the first time that she had encountered criticism: earlier she was criticised by some feminists for having children. Being a mother made it difficult for her to be an activist as most political activities took place at night.

Erler's commitment to the idea of work-life balance, and to encouraging women to have both children and careers, led, in 1991, to her starting a company called Familienservice GmbH (Family Service) to provide corporate work-life solutions through, for example, providing childminders, school-holiday care, and care for elderly relatives. She was its managing director from 1992 to 2008, during which time it grew to having almost 2000 employees.

From 2006 she was head of an agency that promoted the concept of multigenerational houses. In 2011, she was appointed by Winfried Kretschmann as State Councillor for Civil Society and Citizen Participation, the first person to hold such a title in Germany. This position arose out of conflict over the Stuttgart 21 railway and urban development project, and her role was seen as being to improve public consultation over government plans. It gave her voting rights in the Baden-Württemberg cabinet and she remained in this role until 2021.

== Awards ==
Erler was awarded the Elisabeth Selbert Prize in 2005 by the state government of Hesse. In 2021 she was given the Order of Merit of Baden-Württemberg.

== Publications ==
- Frauenzimmer. Für eine Politik des Unterschieds. (Women's room: For a policy of difference). Verlag Klaus Wagenbach, Berlin. 1985
- Weibliche Ökonomie. Ansätze, Analysen und Forderungen zur Überwindung der patriarchalen Ökonomie. (Female Economy. Approaches, analyses and demands to overcome the patriarchal economy), (with Monika Jaeckel). DJI Verlag. German Youth Institute, Munich. 1989. ISBN 3-87966-304-1
- Mütter an die Macht! Die neue Frauen-Bewegun (Mothers to power! The New Women's Movement), (edited with Dorothee Pass-Weingartz). Rowohlt Verlag, Reinbeck. 1987
- Schluss mit der Umerziehung. Vom artgerechten Umgang mit den Geschlechtern, (End the re-education. About dealing with the sexes in a way that is appropriate to the species). Verlag Heyne, Munich 2012, ISBN 978-3-453-18286-8
