= Volker Schebesta =

German politician (born 1971)

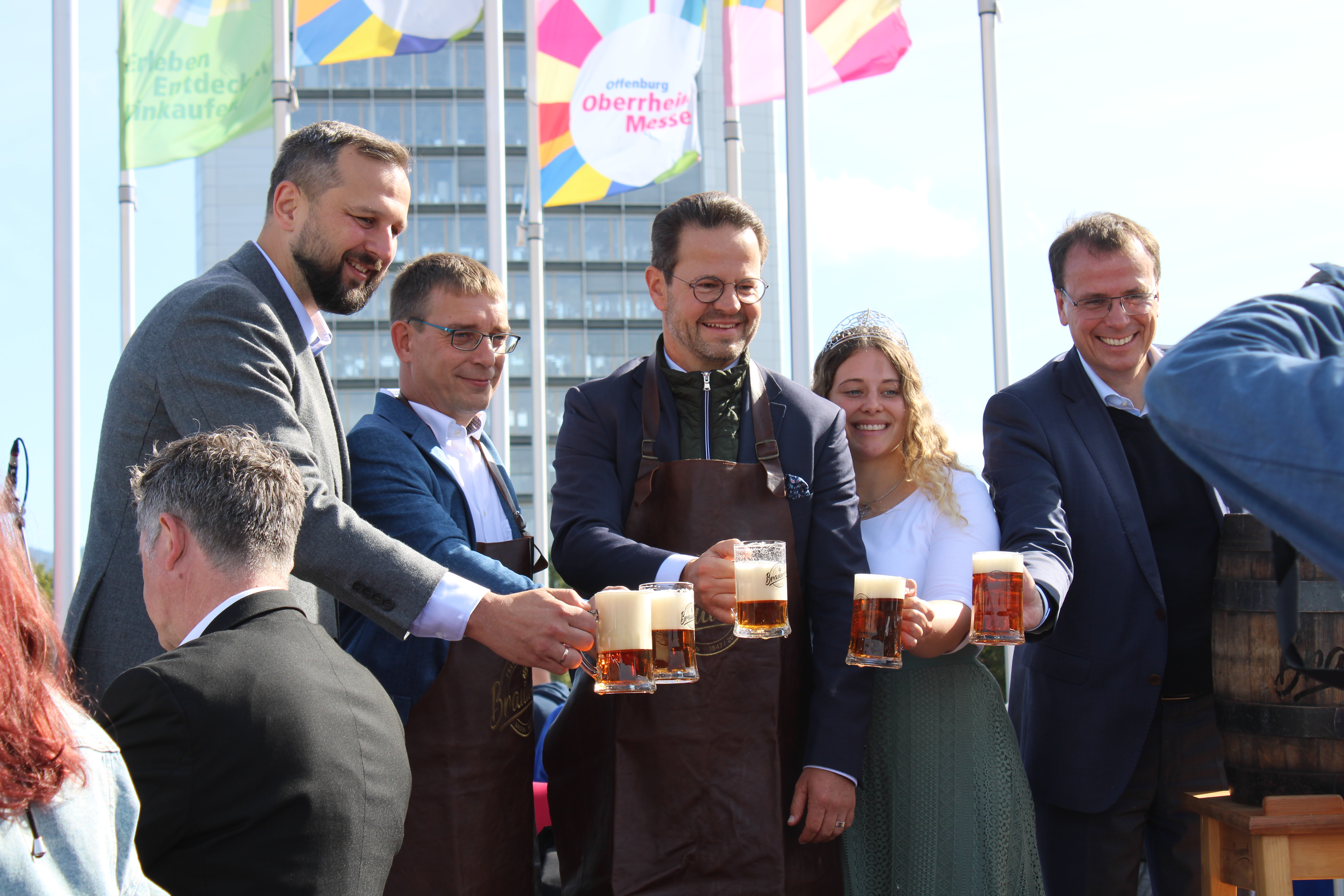
- Schebesta in 2024

Member of the Landtag of Baden-Württemberg
- Incumbent
- Assumed office 1 June 2001
- Constituency: Offenburg

Personal details
- Born: 13 June 1971 (age 54)
- Party: Christian Democratic Union

Volker Schebesta (born 13 June 1971) is a German politician serving as a member of the Landtag of Baden-Württemberg since 2001. He has served as state secretary of culture, youth and sports since 2016.
