= Gisela Splett =

German politician (born 1967)

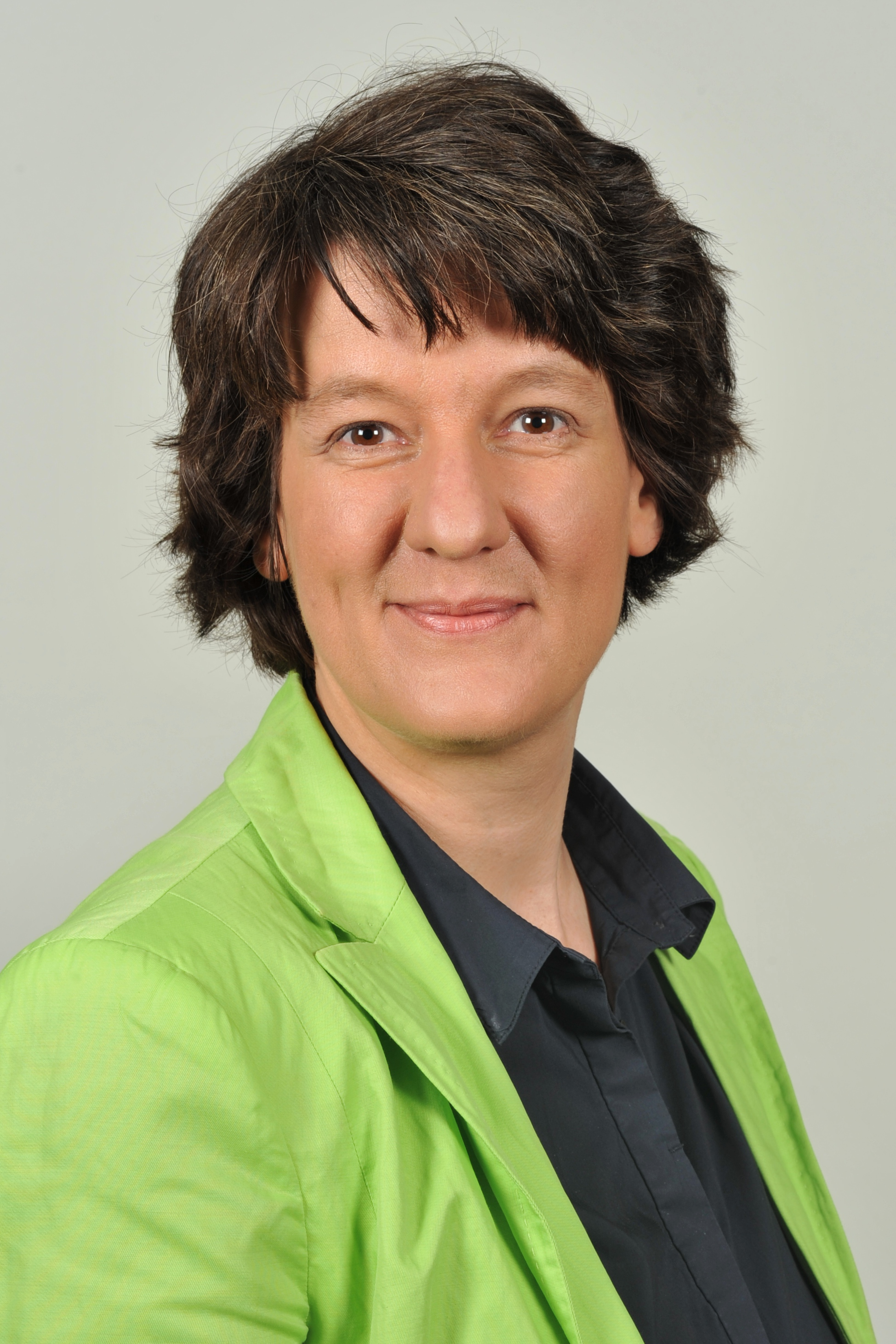
- Splett in 2013

Member of the Landtag of Baden-Württemberg
- In office 1 June 2006 – 30 April 2016
- Constituency: Karlsruhe I

Personal details
- Born: 20 January 1967 (age 59)
- Party: Alliance 90/The Greens (since 1997)

Gisela Splett (born 20 January 1967) is a German politician serving as state secretary of finance of Baden-Württemberg since 2016. From 2011 to 2016, she served as state secretary of transport and infrastructure. From 2006 to 2016, she was a member of the Landtag of Baden-Württemberg.
