= 2021 Baden-Württemberg state election =

State election

- 14 March 2021

All 154 seats in the Landtag of Baden-Württemberg (including 34 overhang and leveling seats) 78 seats needed for a majority
- Turnout: 4,895,238 (63.8%) ▼6.6%
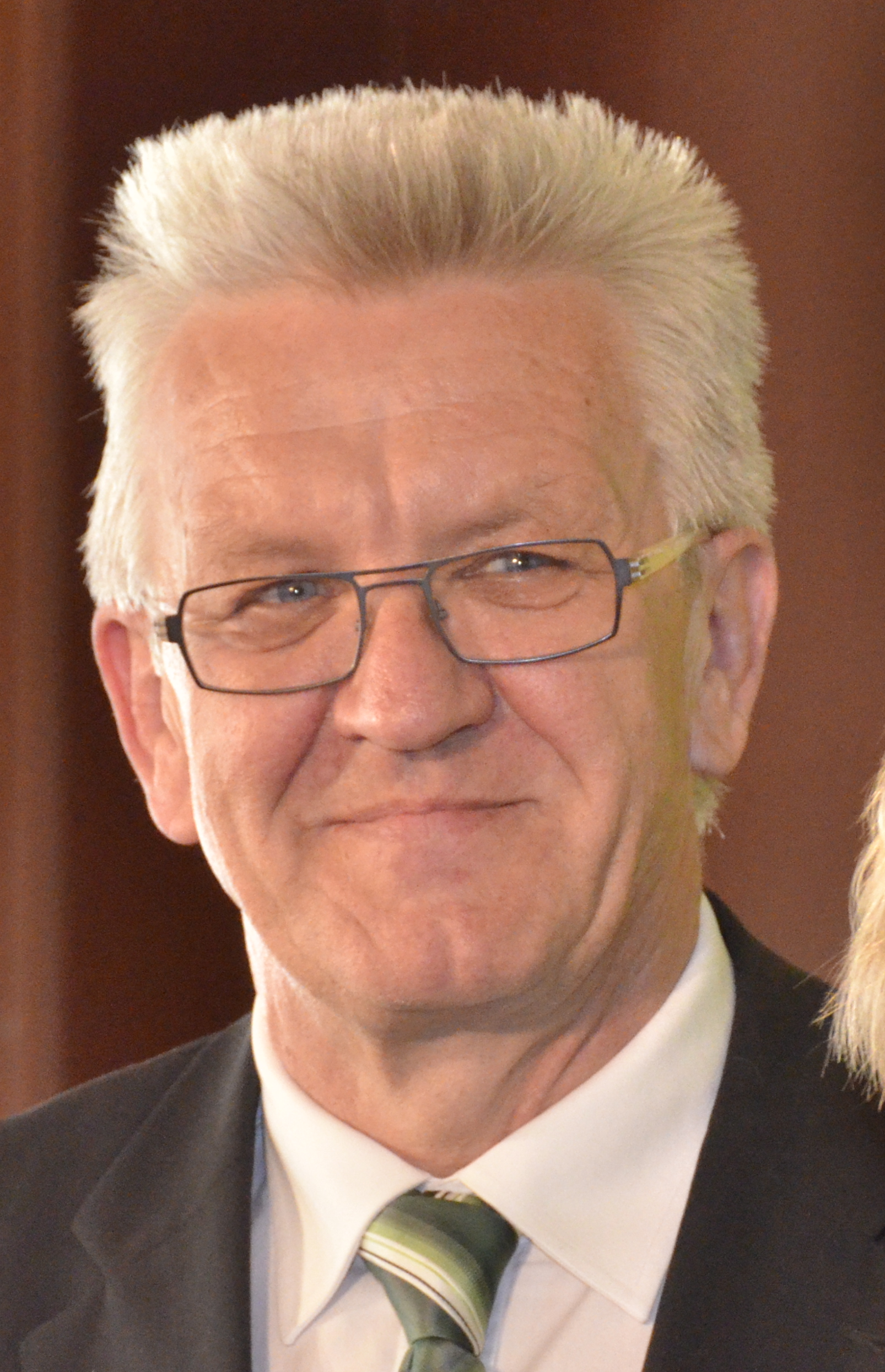

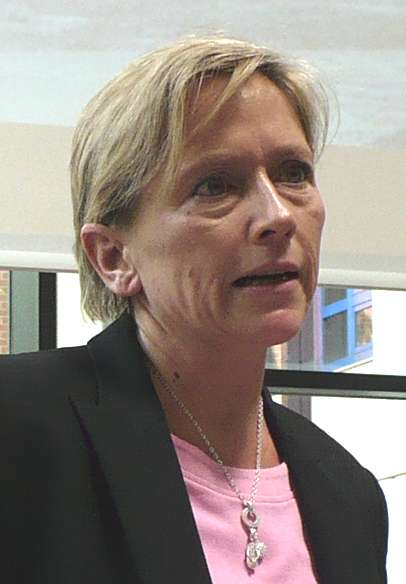

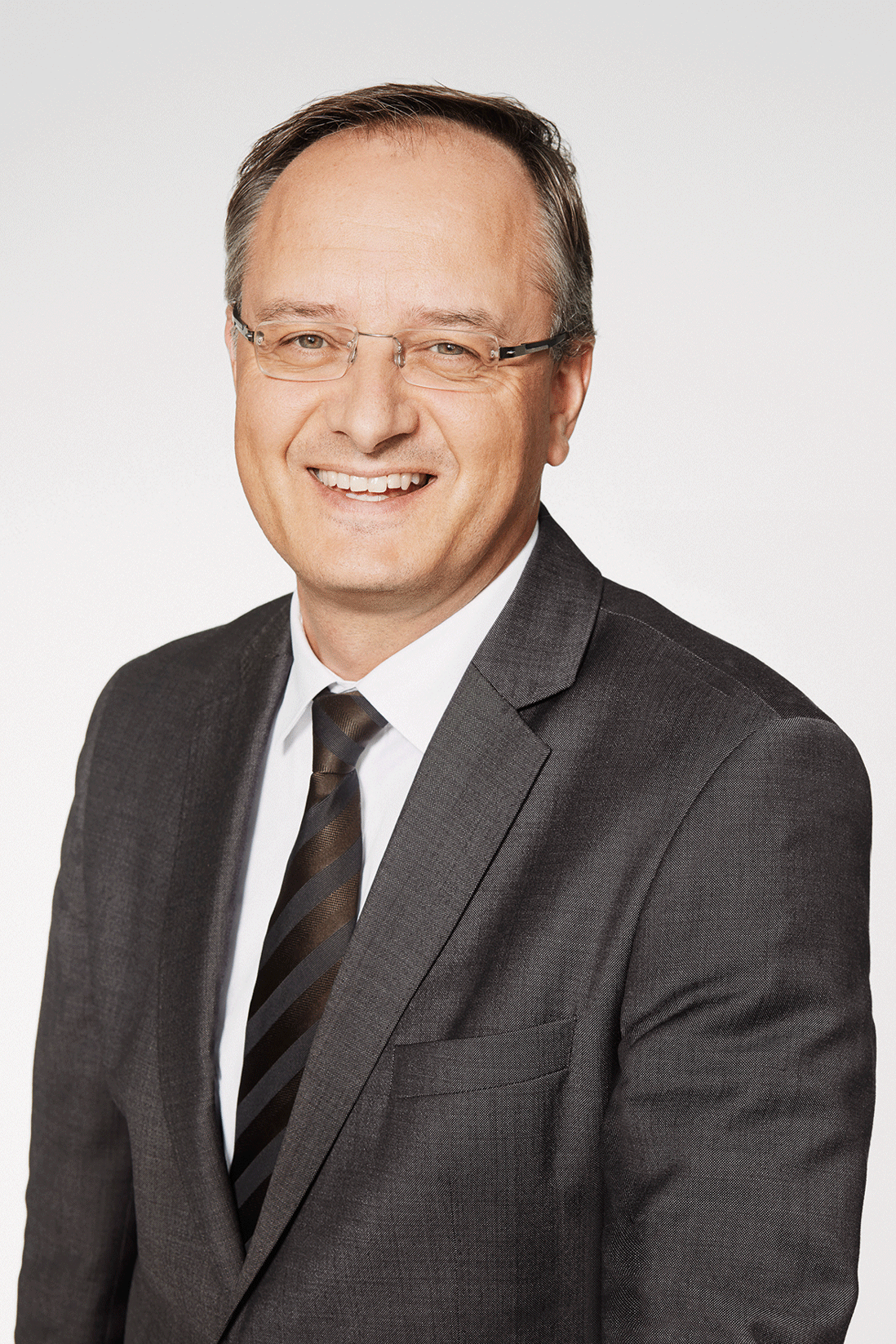

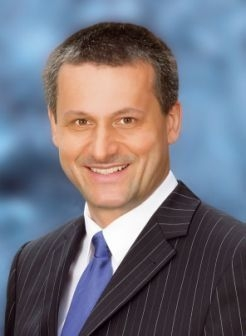

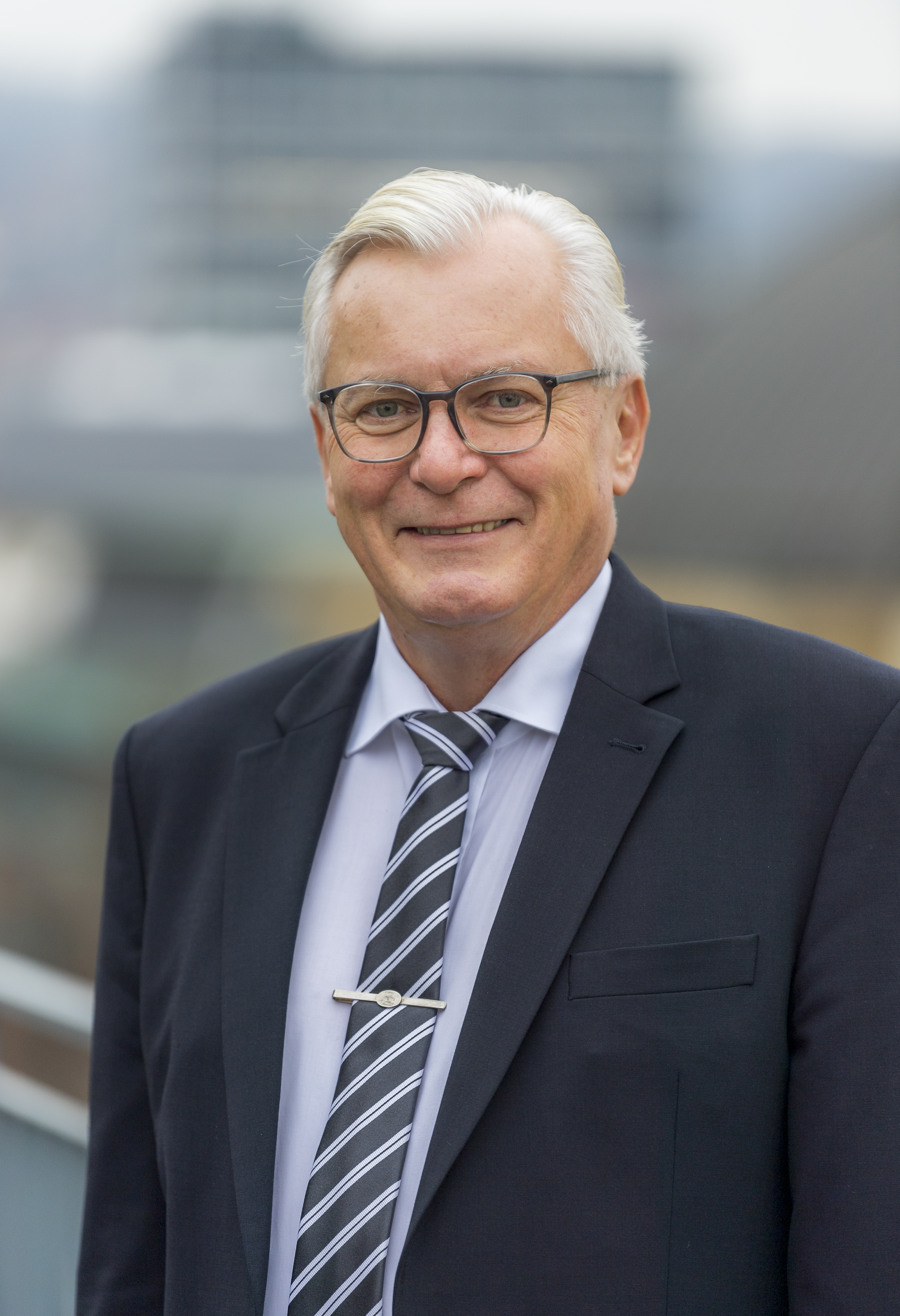
	First party	Second party	Third party
Candidate	Winfried Kretschmann	Susanne Eisenmann	Andreas Stoch
Party	Greens	CDU	SPD
Leader's seat	Nürtingen (1st)	ran in Stuttgart II (not elected)	Heidenheim (2nd)
Last election	47 seats, 30.3%	42 seats, 27.0%	19 seats, 12.7%
Seats won	58	42	19
Seat change	▲11	Steady	Steady
Popular vote	1,585,903	1,168,745	535,462
Percentage	32.6%	24.1%	11.0%
Swing	▲2.3%	▼2.9%	▼1.7%
	Fourth party	Fifth party
Candidate	Hans-Ulrich Rülke	Bernd Gögel
Party	FDP	AfD
Leader's seat	Pforzheim (2nd)	Enz (2nd)
Last election	12 seats, 8.3%	23 seats, 15.1%
Seats won	18	17
Seat change	▲6	▼6
Popular vote	508,278	473,309
Percentage	10.5%	9.7%
Swing	▲2.2%	▼5.4%
- Winners of each constituency Winning candidates in the single-member constituencies, with second mandate seats shown in the top right.
Government before election
Second Kretschmann cabinet
Green–CDU
Government after election
Third Kretschmann cabinet
Green–CDU

The 2021 Baden-Württemberg state election was held on 14 March 2021 to elect the 17th Landtag of Baden-Württemberg. The outgoing government was a coalition of Alliance 90/The Greens and the Christian Democratic Union (CDU) led by Minister-President Winfried Kretschmann.

The Greens remained the largest party with 32.6% of votes, an increase of two percentage points. Their junior coalition partner, the CDU, suffered its worst result in state history, falling to 24%. The opposition Social Democratic Party (SPD) also recorded a decline, but rose from fourth to third place. The Free Democratic Party (FDP) made small gains. Alternative for Germany (AfD) lost more than a third of their vote share and became the smallest party in the Landtag.

The CDU and SPD each recorded no net change in seats thanks to an increase in the size of the Landtag caused by a number of overhang seats won by the Greens. Overall, the governing coalition was returned with an increased majority, but an alternative coalition between the Greens, SPD, and FDP also won a majority; the Greens and SPD together fell one seat short of a majority. On 2 April, the Greens voted to enter negotiations with the CDU. The two parties finalised a coalition agreement on 1 May. Kretschmann was re-elected as Minister-President on 12 May.

== Election date ==
The period of the 16th Landtag formally ends on 30 April 2021. The election of the 17th Landtag must take place before this date. On 24 March 2020, the state government designated 14 March 2021 as the date for the next election, in accordance with Section 19 of the State Parliament Election Act. A state election was held on the same day in neighbouring state of Rhineland-Palatinate.

== Electoral system ==
The Landtag is elected via mixed-member proportional representation. 70 members are elected in single-member constituencies via first-past-the-post voting. 50 members are then allocated using compensatory proportional representation, distributed in each of Baden-Württemberg's four government districts. Unlike other states, Baden-Württemberg does not allow voters to vote separately for party lists to fill proportional seats (the party list is essentially the slate of candidates running in the districts); instead, they are filled by the best-performing candidates who failed to be elected in the single-member constituencies. Candidates elected in this manner are listed as winning a "second mandate" (Zweitmandat) in the constituency in which they ran. The minimum size of the Landtag is 120 members, but if overhang seats are present, proportional leveling seats will be added to ensure proportionality. An electoral threshold of 5% of valid votes is applied to the Landtag; parties that fall below this threshold are excluded.

== Background ==
In the previous election held on 13 March 2016, The Greens became the largest party for the first time in any German state, winning 30.3% of votes cast. The CDU lost 12 percentage points, falling to second place on 27.0%. Alternative for Germany contested their first state election in Baden-Württemberg, placing third with 15.1%. The Social Democratic Party (SPD) lost almost half its voteshare and finished with 12.7%. The Free Democratic Party (FDP) won 8.3%.

The Greens had led a coalition with the SPD since 2011, but this government lost its majority in the election. The Greens subsequently formed a coalition with the CDU, which took office as Cabinet Kretschmann II.

== Parties ==
The table below lists the parties represented in the 16th Landtag.

#	Name		Ideology	Lead candidate	2016 result	
#	Name		Ideology	Lead candidate	Votes (%)	Seats
1	Grüne	Alliance 90/The Greens; Bündnis 90/Die Grünen	Green politics	Winfried Kretschmann	30.3%	47 / 143
2	CDU	Christian Democratic Union of Germany; Christlich Demokratische Union Deutschlands	Christian democracy	Susanne Eisenmann	27.0%	42 / 143
3	AfD	Alternative for Germany; Alternative für Deutschland	Right-wing populism	Bernd Gögel	15.1%	23 / 143
4	SPD	Social Democratic Party of Germany; Sozialdemokratische Partei Deutschlands	Social democracy	Andreas Stoch	12.7%	19 / 143
5	FDP	Free Democratic Party; Freie Demokratische Partei	Classical liberalism	Hans-Ulrich Rülke	8.3%	12 / 143

In addition to the parties already represented in the Landtag, sixteen parties contested the election:

#	Name	Candidates
6	The Left (LINKE)	70
7	Ecological Democratic Party/Family and Environment (ÖDP)	67
8	Pirate Party Germany (Piraten)	4
9	Die PARTEI (PARTEI)	52
10	FREE VOTERS (Freie Wähler)	69
11	Humane World (Menschliche Welt)	2
12	Alliance C – Christians for Germany (Bündnis C)	9
13	German Communist Party (DKP)	1
14	dieBasis – Grassroots Democratic Party of Germany (DieBasis)	60
15	Democracy in Motion (DiB)	3
16	One for All – Party	1
17	Climate List Baden-Württemberg (KlimalisteBW)	67
18	Party of Humanists (PdH)	3
19	Party for Health Research (Gesundheitsforschung)	2
20	Party WIR2020 (W2020)	68
21	Volt Deutschland (Volt)	44

== Campaign ==
=== Lead candidates ===
On 29 May 2019, state Minister for Education, Youth, and Sports Susanne Eisenmann was confirmed as the CDU's lead candidate for the election.

On 12 September 2019, Winfried Kretschmann stated that he would stand as the lead candidate for The Greens in the 2021 election, seeking a third term as Minister-President.

On 1 February 2020, state party leader Andreas Stoch was nominated as the SPD's lead candidate for the election.

On 8 December 2019, the FDP state executive nominated Hans-Ulrich Rülke as their preferred lead candidate for the election. He was formally selected at a party conference in July 2020. Rülke had served as leader of the FDP Landtag faction since 2009, and was the party's lead candidate in the 2016 election.

In August 2020, AfD parliamentary group leader Bernd Gögel advocated against the selection of a lead candidate for the election. He stated that due to the party's position and the state's unusual electoral system, the lead candidate might fall short of election to the Landtag. "If the top candidate missed entry, that would be embarrassing." In January 2021, Gögel defeated deputy parliamentary group leader Emil Sänze to become lead candidate after four rounds of voting in an online member survey.

On 6 December 2020, The Left nominated state spokeswoman Sahra Mirow as their lead candidate for the election.

== Opinion polling ==
=== Graphical summary ===
Local regression of polls conducted

=== Party polling ===
Polling firm	Fieldwork date	Sample size	Grüne	CDU	AfD	SPD	FDP	Linke	Others	Lead
2021 state election	14 Mar 2021	–	32.6	24.1	9.7	11.0	10.5	3.6	8.5	8.6
INSA	11–12 Mar 2021	1,066	32	23	13	11	11	4	6	9
Forschungsgruppe Wahlen	8–11 Mar 2021	1,867	34	24	11	10	11	3	7	10
INSA	1–7 Mar 2021	1,558	32	25	12	10	11	3	7 (Note: Free Voters 2%, Others 5%.)	7
Forschungsgruppe Wahlen	1–4 Mar 2021	1,032	35	24	11	10	10	3	7	11
Infratest dimap	1–3 Mar 2021	1,185	33	25	12	10	10	4	6	8
INSA	8–11 Feb 2021	1,009	31	28	11	11	10	4	5 (Note: Free Voters 1%, Others 4%.)	3
Forschungsgruppe Wahlen	1–4 Feb 2021	1,032	34	28	11	10	9	3	5	6
Infratest dimap	1–2 Feb 2021	1,000	34	27	10	11	9	3	6	7
INSA	5–11 Jan 2021	1,010	30	30	12	12	8	4	4	Tie
Infratest dimap	14–16 Dec 2020	1,001	35	30	11	10	7	3	4	5
INSA	10–16 Nov 2020	1,001	29	31	12	11	7	5	5	2
Infratest dimap	8–13 Oct 2020	1,001	34	29	11	11	6	4	5	5
INSA	2–9 Sep 2020	1,000	28	31	12	12	7	5	5	3
Infratest dimap	27–28 Apr 2020	1,003	34	30	12	11	6	3	4	4
INSA	15–20 Apr 2020	1,523	29	31	11	13	7	4	5	2
Infratest dimap	5–10 Mar 2020	1,001	36	23	14	11	7	5	4	13
INSA	23–28 Oct 2019	1,036	30	27	13	11	9	4	6	3
Infratest dimap	16–17 Sep 2019	1,004	38	26	12	8	8	3	5	12
INSA	6–8 May 2019	1,040	28	27	12	11	10	6	6 (Note: Free Voters 2%, Others 4%.)	1
Infratest dimap	20–26 Mar 2019	1,002	32	28	11	12	9	4	4	4
INSA	7–12 Feb 2019	1,006	29	27	12	13	9	5	5	2
Forsa	29 Jan–1 Feb 2019	1,007	33	23	13	9	9	6	7	10
Infratest dimap	5–10 Sep 2018	1,003	29	28	15	11	7	7	3	1
INSA	1–6 Sep 2018	1,046	27	25	18	12	9	5	4	2
Forsa	8–22 Feb 2018	1,003	32	27	12	12	9	4	4	5
Infratest dimap	26–30 Jan 2018	1,003	29	29	12	12	8	6	4	Tie
Infratest dimap	3–7 Mar 2017	1,004	27	28	11	20	7	4	3	1
Infratest dimap	9–13 Sep 2016	1,001	31	26	17	13	7	3	3	5
2016 state election	13 Mar 2016	–	30.3	27.0	15.1	12.7	8.3	2.9	3.7	3.3

=== Minister-President polling ===
View source data.

Polling firm	Fieldwork date	Sample size				None/Unsure	Lead
Polling firm	Fieldwork date	Sample size	Kretschmann Grüne	Strobl CDU	Eisenmann CDU	None/Unsure	Lead
Forschungsgruppe Wahlen	1–4 Mar 2021	1,032	70	–	11	19	59
Infratest dimap	1–3 Mar 2021	1,185	65	–	17	18	48
Forschungsgruppe Wahlen	1–4 Feb 2021	1,032	70	–	13	17	57
Infratest dimap	1–2 Feb 2021	1,000	65	–	16	13	49
INSA	5–11 Jan 2021	1,010	52	–	12	23	40
Infratest dimap	8–13 Oct 2020	1,001	66	–	13	12	53
Infratest dimap	16–17 Sep 2019	1,004	69	–	13	9	56
Infratest dimap	20–26 Mar 2019	1,002	63	17	–	12	46
Forsa	29 Jan–1 Feb 2019	1,007	59	5	–	–	54
Infratest dimap	5–10 Sep 2018	1,003	67	14	–	10	53

=== Preferred coalition ===
Polling firm	Fieldwork date	Sample size	Assessment	Grüne CDU	CDU Grüne	CDU SPD FDP	Grüne SPD FDP
Forschungsgruppe Wahlen	1–4 Mar 2021	1,032	Positive	49	34	25	28
Forschungsgruppe Wahlen	1–4 Mar 2021	1,032	Negative	27	40	51	46
Forschungsgruppe Wahlen	1–4 Feb 2021	1,032	Positive	44	39	30	26
Forschungsgruppe Wahlen	1–4 Feb 2021	1,032	Negative	32	37	48	51

== Results ==
First mandates by constituency (Wahlkreis)

Party	Votes	%	Swing	Seats			+/–
Party	Votes	%	Swing	Constituency	Party-list	Total	+/–
Alliance 90/The Greens (GRÜNE)	1,586,192	32.6	▲2.3	58	0	58	▲11
Christian Democratic Union of Germany (CDU)	1,168,975	24.1	▼2.9	12	30	42	0
Social Democratic Party of Germany (SPD)	535,489	11.0	▼1.7	0	19	19	0
Free Democratic Party (FDP)	508,429	10.5	▲2.2	0	18	18	▲6
Alternative for Germany (AfD)	473,485	9.7	▼5.4	0	17	17	▼6
The Left (LINKE)	173,317	3.6	▲0.7	0	0	0	0
Free Voters (FW)	146,259	3.0	▲2.9	0	0	0	0
Die PARTEI	59,463	1.2	▲0.9	0	0	0	0
Grassroots Democratic Party of Germany	48,497	1.0	New	0	0	0	New
Climate List Baden-Württemberg	42,685	0.9	New	0	0	0	New
Party WIR2020	41,128	0.8	New	0	0	0	New
Ecological Democratic Party	37,819	0.8	▲0.1	0	0	0	0
Volt Germany	22,782	0.5	New	0	0	0	New
Alliance C – Christians for Germany	4,081	0.1	▲0.1	0	0	0	0
Pirate Party Germany	2,878	0.1	▼0.3	0	0	0	0
Democracy in Motion	1,005	0.0	New	0	0	0	New
Party of Humanists	976	0.0	New	0	0	0	New
Humane World	975	0.0	▲0.0	0	0	0	0
Party for Health Research	468	0.0	New	0	0	0	New
One for All – Party	178	0.0	New	0	0	0	New
German Communist Party	107	0.0	▼0.0	0	0	0	0
Independents	4,463	0.1	▲0.1	0	–	0	0
Total	4,859,651	100.0	–	70	84	154	▲11
Invalid/blank votes	34,849	0.7					
Registered voters/turnout	7,671,039	63.8	▼6.6				
Source: State Returning Officer

Popular vote
GRÜNE	32.64%
CDU	24.05%
SPD	11.02%
FDP	10.46%
AfD	9.74%
LINKE	3.57%
FW	3.01%
Other	5.51%

Landtag seats
GRÜNE	37.66%
CDU	27.27%
SPD	12.34%
FDP	11.69%
AfD	11.04%

Green vote

CDU vote

SPD vote

FDP vote

AfD vote

Linke vote

FW vote

== Aftermath ==
The CDU suffered its worst ever result in the state, falling to 24%. Lead candidate Susanne Eisenmann, whose approval ratings as a minister were described by the Tagesschau as "moderate to bad", claimed responsibility for the poor result. However, factors such as disputes about the state government's response to the COVID-19 pandemic, and the "mask scandal" which broke a few days before the election, were cited as contributing factors.

Both the incumbent Green–CDU coalition and an alternative centre-left "traffic light coalition" of the Greens, SPD, and FDP garnered a majority, leading to speculation about a possible change in the governing arrangement. Combined with the successful re-election of a traffic light government in neighbouring Rhineland-Palatinate the same day, this sparked discussion about the arrangement nationally, including its viability on the federal level. However, the Greens of Baden-Württemberg are considered to be more conservative by the national party standards, with Kretschmann himself identifying as a green conservative and has been associated with economically liberal viewpoints, in addition to being a practicing Catholic.

=== Government formation ===
After the election, Minister-President Kretschmann invited all parties except the AfD to exploratory talks, beginning with the CDU. This somewhat dampened speculation about a possible realignment of the governing coalition, though Kretschmann stated there was no special significance behind the decision to meet with the CDU first. On 2 April, the state Greens voted to enter negotiations with the CDU. The two parties finalised a coalition agreement on 1 May.

On 12 May, Kretschmann was elected as Minister-President for a third term by the Landtag. He won 95 votes with 55 against. The new ministry was sworn in the same day, comprising six Green and five CDU ministers.

== See also ==
- 2021 Rhineland-Palatinate state election
