= Winfried Kretschmann =

German politician (born 1948)

- Kretschmann in 2018

Minister-President of Baden-Württemberg
- In office 12 May 2011 – 13 May 2026
- Deputy: Nils Schmid; Thomas Strobl
- Preceded by: Stefan Mappus
- Succeeded by: Cem Özdemir

President of the Bundesrat
- In office 1 November 2012 – 31 October 2013
- First Vice President: Horst Seehofer
- Preceded by: Horst Seehofer
- Succeeded by: Stephan Weil
Parliamentary constituencies
Member of the Landtag of Baden-Württemberg for Nürtingen
In office 11 May 2016 – 12 May 2026
Preceded by	Thaddäus Kunzmann
In office 11 June 1996 – 11 May 2016
Preceded by	multi-member district
Succeeded by	multi-member district
In office 7 June 1988 – 10 June 1992
Preceded by	multi-member district
Succeeded by	multi-member district
In office 3 June 1980 – 5 June 1984
Preceded by	multi-member district
Succeeded by	multi-member district

Personal details
- Born: 17 May 1948 (age 78) Spaichingen, Allied-occupied Germany
- Party: Alliance 90/The Greens (since 1979)
- Other political affiliations: Communist League of West Germany (1973–1975)
- Spouse(s): Gerlinde Kretschmann, née Kienle (m. 1975)
- Children: 3, including Johannes
- Education: University of Hohenheim
- Occupation: Politician; Teacher
- Website: www.winfried-kretschmann.de

Military service
- Allegiance: Germany
- Branch/service: Bundeswehr
- Years of service: 1968–1970

Winfried Kretschmann (German: [ˈvɪnfʁiːt ˈkʁɛtʃman]; born 17 May 1948) is a German politician who served as Minister-President of Baden-Württemberg from 2011 to 2026. A member of the Alliance '90/Greens, he was President of the Bundesrat and ex officio deputy to the President of Germany from 2012 to 2013. He is the first member of the Greens to serve in these offices. Identifying himself as a green conservative, Kretschmann has been associated with both culturally and economically liberal policies.

Kretschmann has been a member of the state parliament, the Landtag of Baden-Württemberg, since 1980, in the constituency of Nürtingen. In 2006 he was the frontrunner in the Baden-Württemberg state election for his party, as he was in the state election on 27 March 2011. He was also the chairman of his party's parliamentary group.

Following the state election of 2011, Kretschmann was elected on 12 May 2011 by the combined Green-SPD majority in the Landtag to succeed Stefan Mappus as Minister-President of Baden-Württemberg, becoming the first ever Green Minister-President of any German state. Kretschmann has wide personal popularity; if it were possible to elect the Minister-President directly during the Baden-Württemberg election of March 2016, Kretschmann would have won an outright majority according to polls; he was even favored by 45% of CDU supporters. Kretschmann was re-elected in May 2016 as Minister-President while leading a new coalition with the Christian Democrats.

On 12 October 2012 he was elected President of the German Bundesrat for the term from 1 November 2012 to 31 October 2013. This was the first time since 1953, and only the second time ever, that the President was not drawn from the ranks of either the CDU/CSU or the SPD, until 1 November 2021, when Bodo Ramelow of The Left was elected president of the Bundesrat.

Since 28 January 2026, he has been the longest-serving minister-president of the German states, again the first politician from Alliance 90/The Greens to hold this informal position.

== Early life and education ==
Kretschmann was born at Spaichingen in Baden-Württemberg. His parents were expellees from the mostly Roman Catholic region of Ermland (East Prussia) after World War II. He grew up on the rural Swabian Alb (southern Baden-Württemberg). Kretschmann attended a Catholic boarding school in Sigmaringen and passed his Abitur in Riedlingen. Following his military service, he studied to be a teacher of biology and chemistry (later ethics) at the University of Hohenheim in Stuttgart, graduating in 1977.

== Political career ==
=== Early beginnings ===
From 1973 to 1975 Kretschmann was active in the Communist League of West Germany. He later denounced this orientation towards the revolutionary positions of the German student movement as a "political misapprehension"; today he is more ecologically oriented and counted among the members of the more conservative wing of the Greens.

After three years as a school teacher at Sigmaringen, Kretschmann went into politics. He is one of the founding members of the Baden-Württemberg section of the German Green Party (at Sindelfingen on 30 September 1979).

In 1980, Kretschmann was for the first time elected into the Landtag, the state parliament, and a first stint of his chairmanship of his party's parliamentary group followed from 1983 to 1985. In 1985 he left Stuttgart to work in Hessen at the ministry of environment, then run by party colleague Joschka Fischer for two years.

In 1988, Kretschmann returned to Baden-Württemberg, being re-elected into the Landtag in 1988. He lost his seat in 1992, but returned – after four years back as a teacher – in 1996 and held his seat in 2001 and 2006. In 2002, he was again elected chairman of his party's parliamentary group.

=== Minister-President of Baden-Württemberg, 2011–2026 ===
In the 2011 state elections, amid a surge in support for the anti-nuclear Greens following the Fukushima Daiichi nuclear disaster in Japan, a coalition government of Greens and Social Democrats won over the former predominating conservative CDU; Kretschmann was elected as the new state Minister-President of Baden-Württemberg. He ran on a platform that called for shutting down nuclear power plants, overhauling a public school system the Greens see as elitist, and imposing speed limits on Autobahns. Also, Kretschmann is widely regarded as having benefited from his party's opposition to Stuttgart 21, a massive development project in Baden-Württemberg's capital. Kretschmann's election ended 58 years of uninterrupted rule in Baden-Württemberg by the Christian Democratic Union party.

As Minister-President, Kretschmann is a member of the German-French Friendship Group set up by the German Bundesrat and the French Senate as well as of the German-Russian Friendship Group set up in cooperation with the Russian Federation Council. During his tenure, he has made several foreign trips, including to Argentina (2011), Brazil (2011), Turkey (2012), Japan (2013), South Korea (2013), Israel (2013), the United States (2015, 2018, 2022) and China (2015).

When German Chancellor Angela Merkel held preliminary talks to sound out possible common ground with the Green Party in an attempt to form a coalition government following the 2013 elections, Kretschmann was part of the Greens’ delegation.

In the 2016 state elections, Kretschmann led the Green Party to a historic 30%, thus coming three points ahead of the Christian Democrats. For the first time in any German regional election, the Greens emerged the strongest single party in the state. Kretschmann was confirmed as leader of a coalition government of Greens and Christian Democrats in May 2016. As the Green Party's only Minister-President, Kretschmann plays a crucial role to organize the party's informal coordination committee for the Bundesrat.

In July 2020, Kretschmann-led government of Baden-Württemberg banned full-face coverings burqas, niqabs for all school children. The rule will apply to primary and secondary education. Kretschmann said that full-face veiling did not belong in a free society.

Following the ongoing success of the Greens in the 2021 state elections, Kretschmann was subsequently re-elected for serving a third term as minister-president on 12 May 2021.

In 2024, Kretschmann announced that he would not be running for a fourth term as minister-president in 2026 and that Cem Özdemir would be the Greens' candidate. Following Özdemir's victory, Kretschmann stepped down on the 13 May 2026.

== Political positions ==
Kretschmann belongs to the more Realpolitik-oriented, centrist wing of the Green Party, and has been characterised as holding economically liberal, pro-business views. He identifies as a green conservative. His business-friendly approach to policy has caused him to clash with his party on more than one occasion. While he shared his party's official position of favoring an alliance with the SPD after the 2013 federal elections, he repeatedly criticized its campaign. He objected to the Greens’ election platform of tax increases, warning the leadership in a public letter to avoid any move that would be detrimental to business.

When Bavaria filed a lawsuit in the Federal Constitutional Court in 2012, asking the judges to back their call for an overhaul of the German system of financial transfers from wealthier states (such as Bavaria and Baden-Württemberg) to the country's weaker economies, Kretschmann decided that his state would not back the lawsuit and instead urged reform via negotiations between all the states.

Kretschmann has in the past been vocal about climate change policies. In May 2015, he joined Governor Jerry Brown of California and other international leaders from various states and provinces in signing the Under2 MOU, a non-binding climate change agreement in Sacramento, California. At the 2015 United Nations Climate Change Conference, Kretschmann and Brown convened in Paris during the talks to attract more supporters among governors, mayors and other leaders of “subnational” governments for stronger commitments to reducing emissions. During the COVID-19 pandemic in Germany, Kretschmann clashed with environmentalists, as he supported stimulus subsidies for the purchase of cars with relatively efficient combustion engines.

Kretschmann stated that he wants to keep refugees who commit crimes in groups away from major cities and distribute them in the country, saying that the idea of sending some of them "into the pampas" was "not wrong", and adding, "To put it bluntly, the most dangerous thing that human evolution has produced is hordes of young men." He claimed that the 2018 Freiburg gang rape was a "terrible example" of this.

== Other activities ==
- Central Committee of German Catholics, Member
- Roman Catholic Archdiocese of Freiburg, Member of the Council
- Academy of the Roman Catholic Diocese of Rottenburg-Stuttgart, Member of the Board of Trustees
- Deutsches Museum, Ex-Officio Member of the Board of Trustees

== Honours ==
- 2023 Grand Cross of the Order of Merit of the Federal Republic of Germany

== Personal life ==
Kretschmann is a Catholic. He is married with Gerlinde, has three children (including Johannes) and lives in Sigmaringen.

== See also ==
- Kretschmann cabinet
- Green conservatism

== Literature ==
- Henkel, Peter; Henkel-Waidhofer, Johanna (2011). Winfried Kretschmann (in German). Freiburg Basel Wien: Herder. ISBN 978-3-451-33255-5.
- Kretschmann, Winfried; Henkel-Waidhofer, Johanna; Henkel, Peter (2012). Reiner Wein (in German). Freiburg Basel Wien: Herder. ISBN 978-3-451-33269-2.
