= List of minister-presidents of Baden-Württemberg =

Minister-President of Baden-Württemberg
- Ministerpräsident des Landes Baden-Württemberg
- Coat of arms

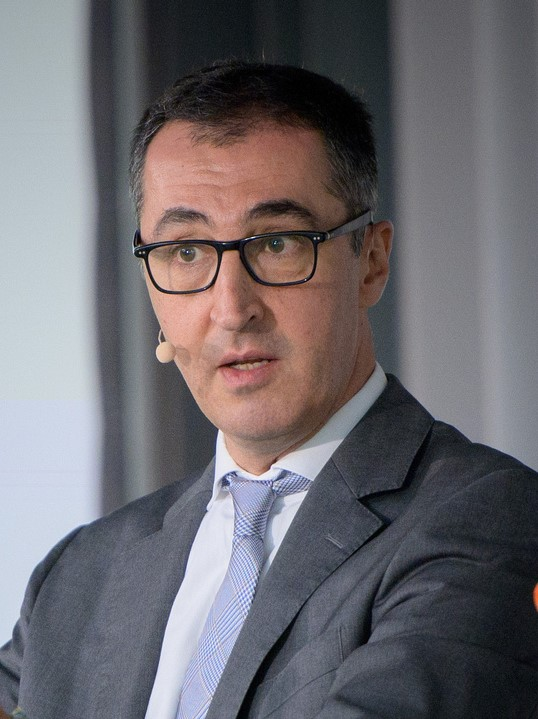
- Incumbent; Cem Özdemir since 13 May 2026
- Status: Head of government
- Member of: Cabinet; Landtag
- Residence: Villa Reitzenstein, Stuttgart
- Nominator: President of the Landtag
- Appointer: Landtag of Baden-Württemberg
- Inaugural holder: Reinhold Maier
- Formation: 25 April 1952
- Deputy: Manuel Hagel
- Website: Official website

This is a list of the men who have served in the capacity of minister-president or equivalent office in Baden, Württemberg and Baden-Württemberg from the 19th century to the present.

== Baden ==
=== Minister-presidents of the Grand Duchy of Baden (1809–1918) ===
- 1809–1810: Sigismund von Reitzenstein
- 1810: Conrad Karl Friedrich von Andlau-Birseck
- 1810–1812: Christian Heinrich Gayling von Altheim
- 1812–1817: Karl Christian von Berckheim
- 1817–1818: Sigismund von Reitzenstein
- 1818–1831: Wilhelm Ludwig Leopold Reinhard von Berstett
- 1832–1833: Sigismund von Reitzenstein
- 1833–1838: Ludwig Georg von Winter
- 1838–1839: Karl Friedrich Nebenius
- 1839–1843: Friedrich Landolin Karl von Blittersdorf
- 1843–1845: Christian Friedrich von Boeckh
- 1845–1846: Karl Friedrich Nebenius
- 1846–1848: Johann Baptist Bekk
- 1848–1849: Karl Georg Hoffmann
- 1849–1850: Friedrich Adolf Klüber
- 1850–1856: Ludwig Rüdt von Collenberg-Bödigheim
- 1856–1860: Franz von Stengel
- 1861–1866: Anton Stabel
- 1866–1868: Karl Mathy
- 1868–1876: Julius Jolly
- 1876–1893: Ludwig Karl Friedrich Turban
- 1893–1901: Franz Wilhelm Nokk
- 1901–1905: Carl Ludwig Wilhelm Arthur von Brauer
- 1905–1917: Alexander von Dusch
- 1917–1918: Heinrich von Bodman

=== Presidents of the Republic of Baden (1918–1945) ===
Political party: SPD Zentrum DDP NSDAP

Portrait	Name (Birth–Death)	Term of office			Political party
Portrait	Name (Birth–Death)	Took office	Left office	Days	Political party
	Anton Geiss (1858–1944)	10 November 1918	14 August 1920	643	Social Democratic Party of Germany
	Gustav Trunk (1871–1936); First term	14 August 1920	23 November 1921	466	Centre Party
	Hermann Hummel (1876–1952)	23 November 1921	23 November 1922	365	German Democratic Party
	Adam Remmele (1877–1951); First term	23 November 1922	23 November 1923	365	Social Democratic Party of Germany
	Heinrich Köhler (1878–1949); First term	23 November 1923	23 November 1924	366	Centre Party
	Willy Hellpach (1877–1955)	23 November 1924	23 November 1925	365	German Democratic Party
	Gustav Trunk (1871–1936); Second term	23 November 1925	23 November 1926	365	Centre Party
	Heinrich Köhler (1878–1949); Second term	23 November 1926	3 February 1927	72	Centre Party
	Gustav Trunk (1871–1936); Third term	3 February 1927	23 November 1927	293	Centre Party
	Adam Remmele (1877–1951); Second term	23 November 1927	23 November 1928	366	Social Democratic Party of Germany
	Josef Schmitt (1874–1939); First term	23 November 1928	20 November 1930	727	Centre Party
	Franz Josef Wittemann (1866–1931)	20 November 1930	10 September 1931	294	Centre Party
	Josef Schmitt (1874–1939); Second term	10 September 1931	11 March 1933	548	Centre Party
	Robert Heinrich Wagner (1895–1946)	Reichkomissar		3	Nazi Party
	Robert Heinrich Wagner (1895–1946)	8 March 1933	11 March 1933	3	Nazi Party
	Robert Heinrich Wagner (1895–1946)	Präsident		58	Nazi Party
	Robert Heinrich Wagner (1895–1946)	11 March 1933	8 May 1933	58	Nazi Party
	Robert Heinrich Wagner (1895–1946)	Reichsstatthalter		4377	Nazi Party
	Robert Heinrich Wagner (1895–1946)	5 May 1933	29 April 1945	4377	Nazi Party
	Walter Köhler (1897–1989)	Ministerpräsident		4349	Nazi Party
	Walter Köhler (1897–1989)	8 May 1933	4 April 1945	4349	Nazi Party

== Württemberg ==
=== Minister-presidents of the Kingdom of Württemberg (1821–1918) ===
- 1821–1831: Christian Friedrich von Otto
- 1831–1848: Paul Friedrich Theodor Eugen Reichsfreiherr von Maucler
- 1848–1849: Friedrich von Römer
- 1849–1850: Johannes von Schlayer
- 1850–1864: Joseph Freiherr von Linden
- 1864–1870: Karl Friedrich Gottlob Freiherr von Varnbüler von und zu Hemmingen
- 1870–1871: Adolf Graf von Taube (acting)
- 1871–1873: Johann August Freiherr von Wächter
- 1873–1900: Hermann Freiherr von Mittnacht
- 1900–1901: Max Freiherr Schott von Schottenstein
- 1901–1906: Wilhelm August von Breitling
- 1906–1918: Karl Freiherr von Weizsäcker
- 1918: Theodor Liesching

=== Presidents of the Free People's State of Württemberg (1918–1945) ===
Political party: SPD DDP DNVP Zentrum NSDAP None

Portrait	Name (Birth–Death)	Term of office			Political party
Portrait	Name (Birth–Death)	Took office	Left office	Days	Political party
	Wilhelm Blos (1849–1927)	9 November 1918	23 June 1920	592	Social Democratic Party of Germany
	Johannes von Hieber (1862–1951)	23 June 1920	8 April 1924	1385	German Democratic Party
	Edmund Rau (1868–1953); Acting	8 April 1924	3 June 1924	56	Non-partisan
	Wilhelm Bazille (1874–1934)	3 June 1924	8 June 1928	1466	German National People's Party
	Eugen Bolz (1881–1945)	8 June 1928	15 March 1933	1741	Centre Party
	Wilhelm Murr (1888–1945)	Reichskommissar		7	Nazi Party
	Wilhelm Murr (1888–1945)	8 March 1933	15 March 1933	7	Nazi Party
	Wilhelm Murr (1888–1945)	Präsident		58	Nazi Party
	Wilhelm Murr (1888–1945)	15 March 1933	12 May 1933	58	Nazi Party
	Wilhelm Murr (1888–1945)	Reichsstatthalter		4368	Nazi Party
	Wilhelm Murr (1888–1945)	5 May 1933	20 April 1945	4368	Nazi Party
	Christian Mergenthaler (1884–1980)	12 May 1933	April 1945	c. 4360	Nazi Party

== Three States (1945–1952) ==
=== Minister-President of Württemberg-Baden ===
Political party: FDP SPD CDU

Portrait	Name (Birth–Death)	Term of office			Political party
Portrait	Name (Birth–Death)	Took office	Left office	Days	Political party
Württemberg-Baden (1945–1949)
American occupation zone in Germany
1	Reinhold Maier (1889–1971)	19 September 1945	23 May 1949	1342	Free Democratic Party
Württemberg-Baden (1949–1952)
State of the Federal Republic of Germany
1	Reinhold Maier (1889–1971)	23 May 1949	25 April 1952	1068	Free Democratic Party
The state of Württemberg-Baden was dissolved on 25 April 1952 and with the merge of Württemberg-Hohenzollern and Baden re-founded as the new federal state of Baden-Württemberg.

=== Minister-President of Württemberg-Hohenzollern ===
Political party: SPD CDU

Portrait	Name (Birth–Death)	Term of office			Political party
Portrait	Name (Birth–Death)	Took office	Left office	Days	Political party
Württemberg-Hohenzollern (1945–1949)
French occupation zone in Germany
1	Carlo Schmid (1896–1979)	16 October 1945	22 July 1947	644	Social Democratic Party of Germany
2	Lorenz Bock (1883–1948)	22 July 1947	3 August 1948 †	378	Christian Democratic Union
–	Carlo Schmid (1896–1979); Acting	4 August 1948	13 August 1948	9	Social Democratic Party of Germany
3	Gebhard Müller (1900–1990)	13 August 1948	23 May 1949	283	Christian Democratic Union
Württemberg-Hohenzollern (1949–1952)
State of the Federal Republic of Germany
(3)	Gebhard Müller (1900–1990)	23 May 1949	25 April 1952	1068	Christian Democratic Union
The state of Württemberg-Hohenzollern was dissolved on 25 April 1952 and with the merge of Württemberg-Baden and Baden re-founded as the new federal state of Baden-Württemberg.

=== President of (South) Baden ===
Political party: CDU

Portrait	Name (Birth–Death)	Term of office			Political party
Portrait	Name (Birth–Death)	Took office	Left office	Days	Political party
South Baden (1945–1946) Baden (1946–1949)
French occupation zone in Germany
For the first year of its existence, the state was directly governed by the French military administration.
1	Leo Wohleb (1888–1955)	3 December 1946	23 May 1949	902	Baden Christian Social People's Party (until 1947) Christian Democratic Union (from 1947)
Baden (1949–1952)
State of the Federal Republic of Germany
(1)	Leo Wohleb (1888–1955)	23 May 1949	25 April 1952	1068	Christian Democratic Union
The state of Baden was dissolved on 25 April 1952 and with the merge of Württemberg-Baden and Württemberg-Hohenzollern re-founded as the new federal state of Baden-Württemberg.

== Baden-Württemberg (1952–present) ==
Minister-President of Baden-Württemberg

Political party: FDP CDU Green

Portrait	Name (Birth–Death)	Term of office			Political party	Cabinet
Portrait	Name (Birth–Death)	Took office	Left office	Time in office	Political party	Cabinet
1	Reinhold Maier (1889–1971)	25 April 1952	30 September 1953 (resigned)	1 year, 158 days	FDP	I
2	Gebhard Müller (1900–1990)	30 September 1953	17 December 1958 (resigned)	5 years, 78 days	CDU	I II
3	Kurt Georg Kiesinger (1904–1988)	17 December 1958	1 December 1966 (resigned)	7 years, 349 days	CDU	I II III
Deputy Minister-President Wolfgang Haußmann (FDP) served as acting minister-president from 1 to 16 December 1966.
4	Hans Filbinger (1913–2007)	16 December 1966	30 August 1978 (resigned)	11 years, 257 days	CDU	I II III IV
5	Lothar Späth (1937–2016)	30 August 1978	13 January 1991 (resigned)	12 years, 136 days	CDU	I II III IV
Deputy Minister-President Gerhard Weiser (CDU) served as acting minister-president from 13 to 22 January 1991.
6	Erwin Teufel (born 1939)	22 January 1991	21 April 2005 (resigned)	14 years, 89 days	CDU	I II III IV
7	Günther Oettinger (born 1953)	21 April 2005	9 February 2010 (resigned)	4 years, 294 days	CDU	I II
Deputy Minister-President Ulrich Goll (FDP) served as acting minister-president from 9 to 10 February 2010.
8	Stefan Mappus (born 1966)	10 February 2010	12 May 2011	1 year, 91 days	CDU	I
9	Winfried Kretschmann (born 1948)	12 May 2011	13 May 2026	15 years, 1 day	Alliance 90/The Greens	I II III
10	Cem Özdemir (born 1965)	13 May 2026	Incumbent	117 days	Alliance 90/The Greens	I

== See also ==
- List of monarchs of Baden
- List of monarchs of Württemberg
