= Franz von Roggenbach =

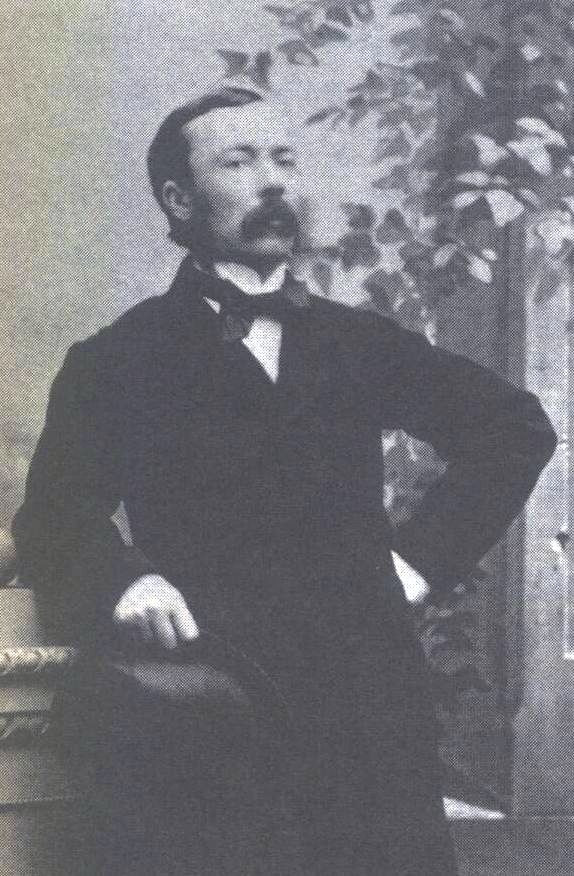
- Born: 23 March 1825; Mannheim, Grand Duchy of Baden
- Died: 25 May 1907; Freiburg im Breisgau, Baden, Germany
- Education: University of Heidelberg
- Occupations: Diplomat; Government minister Member of parliament
- Spouse(s): Marie von Nassau (1814–1902); It is not clearly established whether or not they were ever actually married. The marriage, if it took place, would have been morganatic.
- Children: no
- Parent(s): Heinrich von Roggenbach (1787–1870); Melanie von Walderdorff (1795-1868),

Franz von Roggenbach (23 March 1825 - 25 May 1907) was a leading Baden politician. During the 1860s he served, by some definitions, as the final Foreign minister of the Grand Duchy of Baden.

== Life ==
=== Provenance, early years and 1848 ===
Franz Freiherr von Roggenbach was born in Mannheim. He came from an ancient family of Catholic nobility. His father, Baron Heinrich von Roggenbach (1787–1870), was a career soldier. His mother, the Countess Melanie von Walderdorff (1795-1868), also came from a prominent ancient family.

He concluded his school years at the Mannheim Lyceum (secondary school) in September 1843. At university, he became a member of the Heidelberg Burschenschaft (student fraternity) shortly after arriving, in 1843. He studied Jurisprudence under various distinguished teachers such as the historian Friedrich Christoph Schlosser, the historian-politicians Georg Gottfried Gervinus and Ludwig Häusser, along with the jurist - and a particularly influential mentor - Robert von Mohl. In Autumn 1845 he moved away, for a year, to study in Berlin where his lecturers included Friedrich Julius Stahl. One of the friends he made during this time was the young law student Julius Jolly, a future political colleague. After passing his state law exams in February 1848 he moved to his parents' house at Freiburg, intending to deepen his education in history and education, and to "come to an understanding of his times and their needs" ("zum Verständnis seiner Zeit und ihrer Beduerfnisse zu gelangen") The revolutionary outburst in March of that year may have provided clues, and he moved to Frankfurt which had quickly become the focus of many of the important political developments of 1848. During 1848/49 he served briefly as a volunteer secretary in the Foreign Ministry of the short-lived Provisional Central Government ("Provisorische Zentralgewalt") established by the liberal-nationalist "revolutionaries" of the Frankfurt Parliament. Roggenbach resigned his post, however, after the King of Prussia refused the Frankfurt Parliament's "offer" of the "crown of Germany" in April 1849.

During the middle part of 1849 Roggenbach stayed for several months in Berlin before returning west. From 1849 till 1851 he served the Grand Duchy as a young diplomat at its mission in Bonn, which by this time was becoming an important administrative centre in the Kingdom of Prussia's Rhine Province. In Bonn he came to know the influential writers Prof. Ernst Moritz Arndt and Friedrich Christoph Dahlmann. In April 1851 he resigned from his diplomatic post and undertook a lengthy "study tour" of France and England, during which he took the opportunity to network with diplomats, members of the nobility and of the political elites in those countries.

=== Power and politics ===
Roggenbach was a near-contemporary and close friend of Frederick I, who became Grand Duke of Baden in 1858 but had been regent since 1852 due to his elder brother's mental illness. Roggenbach and Frederick were closely aligned politically, both being believers in constitutional liberalism, as it was understood at the time.

Politics in the Grand Duchy during the 1850s were increasingly preoccupied with the Baden Kulturkampf (loosely "...culture wars), a church-state power struggle. At issue were such matters as control over church assets and appointments. Church-state rivalry was inherent in the power structures across and beyond the Holy Roman Empire, and English language sources tend to focus on the larger Prussian "Kulturkampf" of the 1870s. One reason that the issues became particularly heated in Baden two decades earlier seems to have been the attitude of the leading bishops in the Upper Rhine region, rejecting the state's insistence on a right of veto over church appointments and demanding that clergy should be educated in their own ecclesiastical places of learning rather than in the universities. From the wings, the governments in Berlin and Vienna looked on and quietly exerted their influence, with the Prussian government generally backing the more secularist position of the Baden government in Karlsruhe, and pressure from the conservative Austrians, reflecting a long-standing community of interests with the Roman Curia, more sympathetic to the idea of compromise with the churchmens' demands. In 1854 a so-called "Interim" (agreement) was concluded between the government of Baden and the church. A more comprehensive "Convention" was negotiated for ratification in 1859. Roggenbach had been sent to Berlin in February/March 1859 in order to report back to the Grand Duke, on the mood and attitudes of the government in Berlin, where the focus of attention was on the pan-European implications of Austria's war in Italy rather than on church-state rivalry in Baden. During the summer of 1859 Roggenbach removed himself to the Island of Mainau. His purpose was to draw up plans for a new kind of state structure. In Autumn 1859 he presented his remarkably wide-ranging and detailed "Bundesreformplan" to the Grand Duke, outlining the possible structure of a future united German state. Roggenbach was by now a trusted advisor to the Grand Duke, and it was with the uncompromising backing of Roggenbach that the Grand Duke refused to sign the "Convention", declaring it to be unconstitutional. In a memorandum dated 6 December 1859 Roggenbach had stated baldly "This convention is impossible" ("Diese Konvention ist unmoeglich"). Roggenbach was a practicing catholic believer, but in matters of church-state relations, as in his political world-view more generally, his liberal instincts would always prevail. In rejecting the convention, the Grand Duke was opposing a convention negotiated by his own government, but his attitude nevertheless enjoyed support from a majority in the second chamber of the national assembly ("parliament"), which was dominated by liberals who would have seen the church as a reactionary force. After losing the parliamentary vote on the convention in March 1860 the Stengel government was out of power. That led to the installation of a new government under Minister President Anton Stabel, which enjoyed overwhelming support in the parliament. Without further drama, but in line with the Grand Duke's belief in constitutional monarchy, what now emerged is identified in sources as one of the first examples in the Holy Roman Empire of a system of "parliamentary monarchy".

Roggenbach was initially reluctant to become a member of the new Stabel government, but he did so, formally on 2 May 1961, his formal area of responsibility covering foreign affairs and relations with the Royal House. He was one of two or three leading figures in the government. With respect to the German Question he had a clear vision for the future of the Grand Duchy. With his friend Julius Jolly he advocated German unification according to a "Small Germany" model that would exclude Austria-Hungary, and which accordingly would operate under liberal Prussian leadership. Unsurprisingly, this was also the model favoured by the Grand Duke himself. In 1863, following the retirement of Gideon Weizel, the trade-commerce portfolio was added to Roggenbach's portfolio of ministerial responsibilities.

In July 1861 the Prussian king undertook a visit to the health resort at Baden-Baden and Franz Roggenbach took the opportunity to present his "Bundesreformplan" to the Prussian king. The plan appears to have been reviewed and in broad terms endorsed by key members of the Prussian government. The reactions of Prussia's recently appointed ambassador to the Russian Empire, Otto von Bismarck was necessarily a written reaction, and it was positive with regard to the idea of a German state extending to the Swiss frontier and excluding Austria, although for some of Roggenbach's more detailed thoughts on the structures of a future Germany state, Bismarck's endorsement was notably more nuanced. Nevertheless, the new Prussian king was at this point widely celebrated as a champion of liberal causes, and it was easy to infer that in most important respects the ideas of the government in Karlsruhe - Roggenbach's ideas - were aligned with those of the Prussian government. In 1862, however, the Prussian king appointed Otto von Bismarck as his chief minister. In a letter he wrote to Robert von Mohl in October 1862 Roggenbach described Bismarck as an unprincipled Junker ("...für einen grundsaßlosen Junker"), a chancer ("...für einen waghalsigen Spieler") and a person without conscience ("...für einen gewissenlosen Mensch") interested only in maintaining his own power. It may have been an ungenerous assessment, but in it Roggenbach correctly acknowledged that with Bismarck in place, Prussia might still champion Prussian leadership for a united Germany, but she could no longer be regarded as a champion of liberal ideals. in the aftermath of the Schleswig-Holstein crisis Roggenbach resigned his ministerial offices suddenly in 1865. The resignation was attributed to "constitutional differences". When a new government was appointed in July 1866 Franz von Roggenbach was not a member of it.

=== Parliamentarian ===
Franz von Roggenbach made his home at Schloss Ehner-Fahrnau, a small country estate that he had inherited from his father on the edge of Schopfheim. Between 1861 and 1866, he held a seat in the second chamber of the national assembly ("Badische Ständeversammlung"), representing Schopfheim and the adjacent settlement of Kandern ("Wahlbezirk der Ämter Schopfheim und Kandern"), giving up his seat after the Austro-Prussian War.

Between 1868 and 1870, he sat as a member of the Zollparlament, which represented the German states that were members of the newly reconstituted customs union ("Zollverein"). He sat as one of the many members of the National Liberal group. The voting districts were larger than for the "Badische Ständeversammlung", but he represented, as before, an electoral district in the extreme southwest of the country, incorporating now the towns of Lörrach, Müllheim and Staufen.

After the Franco-Prussian War and the Treaty of Frankfurt, which set the seal on Bismarck's unification project, Roggenbach sat as a member of the new German parliament (Reichstag) between 1871 and 1873, representing (broadly as before) the Lörrach-Müllheim electoral district (Wahlkreis Baden 4 - Lörrach-Müllheim-Staufen-Breisach). He was at this point a member of the short-lived Imperial Liberal Party ("Liberale Reichspartei").

=== "Statesman without a state" ===
Franz von Roggenbach was a prolific letter writer, especially after he dropped out of front-line politics. He remained politicvally and personally close to Frederick I, Grand Duke of Baden (1826-1907). He also maintained good relations with the Prussian Queen (later "Empress") Augusta, whom he supplied with length memoranda, "prepared with the expertise and authority of an experienced German diplomat and minister". For more than ten years he also provided his services as a political consultant to the empress's son, Crown Prince Frederick and his English-born wife. Roggenbach never made any serious effort to conceal his loathing for Bismarck, and the German chancellor viewed Roggenbach, understandably, as a constant focus for liberal intrigue among well-placed members of the political establishment and royal households.

In addition, operated as a political consultant to Empress Augusta's friend, Admiral Albrecht von Stosch, a member of the Crown Prince's inner circle who was seen, for some time, as a credible political rival to Bismarck.

=== Straßburg University ===
Straßburg University had been destroyed by the "Terror" during the 1790s and then cautiously replaced by various low-profile teaching institutions appropriate to the times under the French First Republic before being relaunched by Napoleon in 1806 as a francophone university. After 1871, with Elsaß back under German control for the first time since 1790, demands arose for the re-establishment of a proper German university in Straßburg. On 24 May 1871 those demands crystallised in a resolution of the German Reichstag. It was evidently Chancellor Bismarck himself who identified this as a project that might usefully occupy Roggenbach's energies. Roggenbach was appointed to head up a commission charged with re-founding the German University at Straßburg, and he applied himself to the matter with characteristic energy. An early decision involved appointing Friedrich Heinrich Geffcken, widely seen as a political victim of the chancellor's vindictive character, to a professorship of constitutional studies and public law. The German University at Strasbourg was inaugurated on 1/2 May 1872 and Roggenbach's role as project "curator" was at an end. His ambitious plans were soon scaled back by the government following disputes about funding, but sources indicate that there was nevertheless much reason to celebrate his contribution to the project.

== Personal ==
Franz von Roggenbach died as a result of Pneumonia on 24 May 1907. He continued to correspond with friends throughout the later decades of his life, and there is some sense of regret towards the end that he had not been able to influence events more strongly in support of the traditional liberalist positions that he favoured.
