= Philipp von Jolly =

German physicist and mathematician

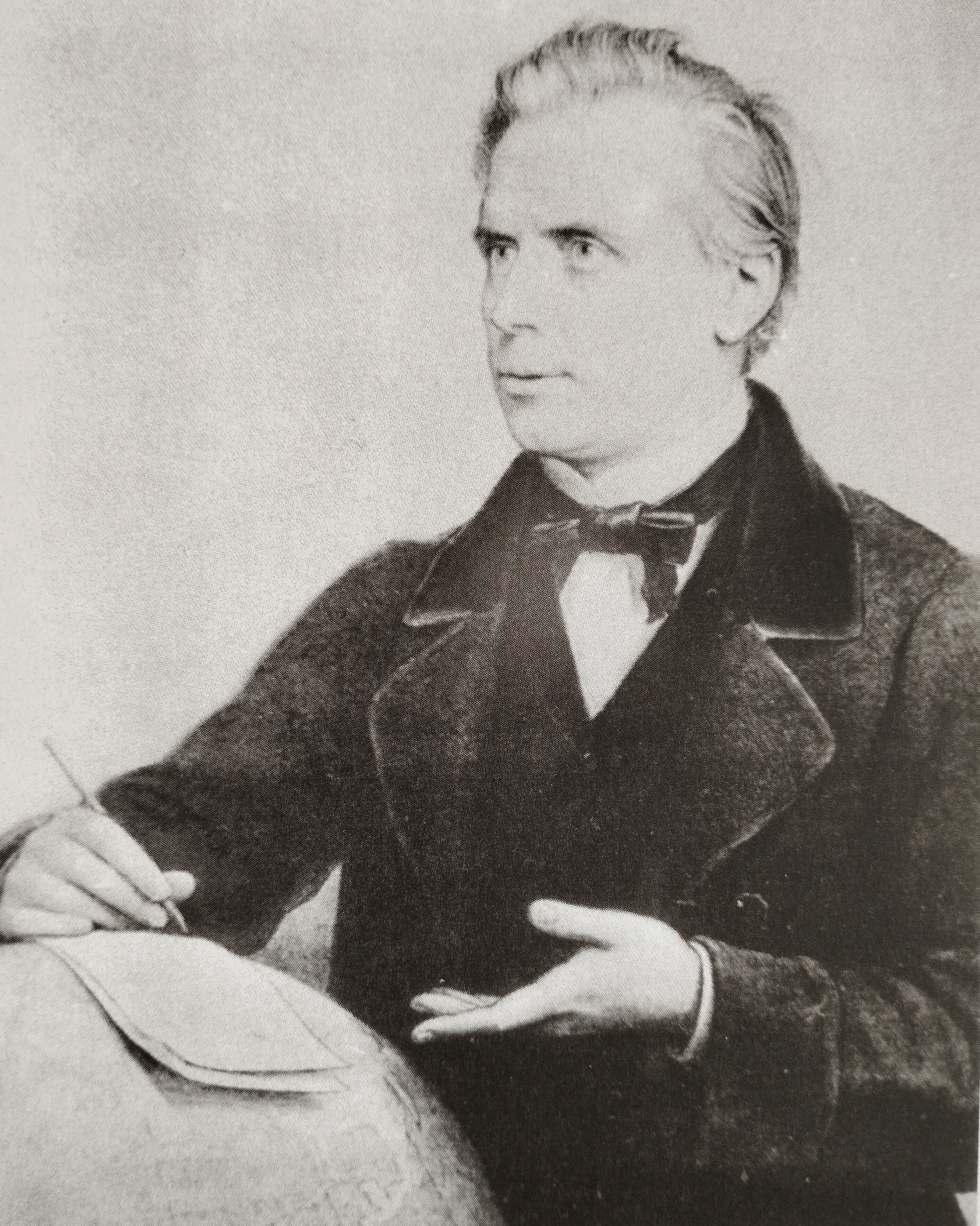
- Drawing of von Jolly by Wilhelm von Kaulbach from 1874.
- Born: Johann Phillipp Gustav Jolly; September 26, 1809; Mannheim, Grand Duchy of Baden
- Died: December 24, 1884 (aged 75); Munich, German Empire
- Resting place: Alter Südfriedhof, Munich, Germany
- Education: Heidelberg University
- Known for: Jolly balance
- Children: Friedrich Jolly
- Father: Ludwig Jolly
- Relatives: Julius Jolly (brother)
- Scientific career
- Fields: Experimental physics
- Workplaces: Ludwig-Maximilians-Universität München
- Thesis: De Euleri meritis de functionibus circularibus: praecedit Historia Functionum Circularium Usque Ad Eulerum Continuata (1834)
- Doctoral students: Philipp Carl

Signature
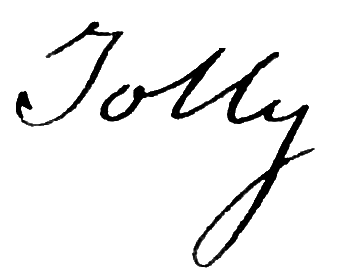

Johann Philipp Gustav von Jolly (26 September 1809 – 24 December 1884) was a German experimental physicist. He measured gravitational acceleration with precision weights and also worked on osmosis. He also designed several tools like the Jolly balance in 1864, a special eudiometer in 1878, as well as his own air pump and Jolly air thermometer.

He is the father of neurologist Friedrich Jolly.

== Life ==
Johann Phillip Gustav Jolly was born in Mannheim, as the son of merchant Ludwig Jolly and Marie Eleonore Jolly, who came originally from France. Politician Julius Jolly was Philipp's brother.

His primary education was in Mannheim. Jolly attended Heidelberg University in 1829 to study physics and mathematics. During his studies, he worked in Vienna as a mechanician for factories and mining plants, before returning to Heidelberg in 1834, where he received his PhD. After his studies, he was appointed professor of mathematics in 1839 and professor of physics in 1846, at Heidelberg University.

He moved to the Ludwig-Maximilians-Universität München in 1854, where he took the position once held by Georg Simon Ohm. He was knighted in 1854 (and henceforth referred to as von Jolly).

Jolly died in Munich.

== Relationship with other scientists ==
Von Jolly was initially skeptical of Julius von Mayer's theory on the mechanical equivalent of heat. Ernst Mach recalled a time when von Mayer was looking for advice, but Jolly said that if von Meyer's theory was right "then water should be warmed by merely shaking it." Von Meyer immediately left the room without saying a word, and after a few weeks, he surprised von Jolly in his office by shouting "and so it is!" (German: Es ischt aso!).

One of Jolly's students at the Ludwig-Maximilians-Universität München was Max Planck, whom he advised in 1878 not to go into theoretical physics. Nevertheless, Planck's later work led to the discovery of quantum mechanics. Later in life Planck reported:

As I began my university studies I asked my venerable teacher Philipp von Jolly for advice regarding the conditions and prospects of my chosen field of study. He described physics to me as a highly developed, nearly fully matured science, that through the crowning achievement of the discovery of the principle of conservation of energy it will arguably soon take its final stable form. It may yet keep going in one corner or another, scrutinizing or putting in order a jot here and a tittle there, but the system as a whole is secured, and theoretical physics is noticeably approaching its completion to the same degree as geometry did centuries ago. That was the view fifty years ago of a respected physicist at the time.

Philipp Carl obtained his doctorate in 1860 at the Ludwig-Maximilians-Universität München, supervised by von Jolly and Johann von Lamont.

== Selected works ==
- Anleitung zur Differential- und Integralrechnung, 1846 – Manual of differential and integral calculus.
- Die Principien der Mechanik, 1852 – The principles of mechanics.
- Eine Federwage zu exacten Wägungen, 1864 – A spring balance for exact weight measurements.
- Die Anwendung der Waage auf Probleme der Gravitation, 1878, zweite Abhandlung, 1881 – Application of a scale to problems of gravitation in two parts.
