= Anton von Stabel =

German judge and politician (1806–1880)

- Born: Anton Stabel; 9 October 1806; Stockach, Nellenburg (in the Holy Roman Empire till 1806: in the Grand Duchy of Baden after 1810)
- Died: 22 March 1880 (aged 74); Karlsruhe, Baden, Germany
- Education: Tübingen; Heidelberg
- Occupations: Lawyer; Court administrator Prosecutor; Judge; University Law professor Government minister "Minister-President" of Baden
- Spouse: Crescentia Müller
- Children: 6
- Parent(s): Jakob Stabel; Maria Anna ______

Anton Stabel (9 October 1806 - 22 March 1880) was a Baden lawyer, judge and statesman. For a number of years he was the Grand Duchy's senior judge. Subsequently, following a succession of ministerial appointments, he became president of the council of ministers and minister of state (head of government - often, if very loosely, translated into English as "Minister-President"), serving between 1861 and 1866. He is remembered, most particularly, for a series of exemplary Judicial and Court reforms.

== Life and works ==
=== Provenance and early years ===
Anton Stabel was born into a protestant family at Stockach, today in the extreme south-west of Germany. When he was born, however, the region was contested between the French empire and the disintegrating Holy Roman Empire. Stabel was born less than a year after the Battle of Austerlitz, which had triggered the rapid Dissolution of the Holy Roman Empire. His father Jakob Stabel as well as his wife Maria Anna were senior government officials in Stockach which, till 1805, was the administrative capital of the Nellenburg Langraviate. Nellenburg had been administered, on behalf of the House of Hapsburg, by Austrian bailiffs for more than three centuries, till 1805. Stabel's childhood coincided with a period of military and political turbulence. In 1810 the district was transferred by the French emperor to Baden, of which it would remain a part throughout and beyond Anton Stabel's life. Stabel attended the secondary school in nearby Donaueschingen till around 1822. He then studied Civil Law and Jurisprudence at the universities of Tübingen and Heidelberg. As a student, in 1822 he joined the venerable Germania Tübingen (student fraternity). Other student societies he joined were the local "Burschenverein" and the "Burschenschaft Feuerreiter". In 1823 he became a member of the Old Heidelberger (student fraternity).

=== Lawyer ===
On 15 January 1828, after passing the necessary state law exams, Stabel embarked, on a legal internship. Following a two year traineeship spent in regional government offices at Ettenheim and Wertheim, he was accepted for work as a government lawyer by decrees of the Interior Ministry, dated 1 December 1829, and of the Justice Ministry, dated 19 January 1830. This meant that he was authorized to represent a case before a judge of the higher courts under almost any circumstances subject only to the requirement (in practice virtually meaningless) that he should have the "assistance" of a lawyer ("Procurator") with the right of audience at the court in question. In 1832 he was himself appointed a senior court advocate ("Obergerichtsadvokat & Prokurator") at the Court House in Mannheim. The next year, still aged only 26, he accepted the additional appointment of "Prokurator" at the nearby High Court for Baden. After eight years working as a lawyer, in October 1838 he took a government appointment as an Assessor (judicial assistant) at the Court in Mannheim, and in 1840 a public prosecutor. There are indications that he had been in poor health during the later 1830s, and the administrative nature of the government job he took in 1838 may have been less stressful than the schedule under which he had been operating as an advocate. Respect for his achievements as an advocate between 1830 and 1838, at a time when many of the court and legal ground rules were still in a state of significant flux following the introduction in 1810 of the foreign and in many ways alien "Code Napoléon", was nevertheless widespread among colleagues. New procedural rules implemented in May 1832 placed a far greater importance on oral pleadings, delivered in open court, than had applied hitherto. Stabel's crisp advocacy style favoured sharpness and brevity. His pleadings were factual and law-based. He disliked and avoided lengthy written submissions and shunned the oratorical declamatory phrase-making characteristic - according to German sources - of French advocacy.

=== Rising star of the legal profession / court official / professor ===
In January 1841 Stabel was appointed to a junior judicial post as an "Hofgerichtsrathe", no longer in Mannheim but, closer to the region of his birth and childhood, at Freiburg. By this time he was causing something of a stir among legal professionals with his contributions to the specialist legal journals "Annalen der großherzoglich-badischen Gerichte" and "Blättern für Justiz und Verwaltung". It was also in 1841, on 9 November, that he embarked on a parallel career in the universities sector, accepting a professorial teaching chair in Civil Law at the University of Freiburg, a position vacated some ten weeks earlier through the death of the previous incumbent, Prof. Dr. Duttlinger (1788-1841). Following Stabel's university appointment he appears to have stepped back for a few years from his government work with the judicial service.

=== Teacher ===
In 1843 Stabel published his "Vorträge über das französische und badische Civilrecht, insbesondere über dessen Einleitung". (The title was subsequently simplified.) It consisted of a general introduction to the "Code Napoléon" (legal code), which had benefitted from a number of additions and refinements since its introduction in Baden. Although the author's preference for oral teaching was well established, he explained that in this case written backup was necessary in order to communicate to his learners, due to the interpretational complexities of the subject. It is nevertheless worth quoting from his introductory section, both because he felt the need to justify the written format and because of the way he sets out pedagogical precepts to which he would remain faithful through his later career in the law, teaching and politics: "I have not piled in with endless overlapping citations, but have tried to restrict myself to what is necessary to support the assertions and represent the evaluations provided by those making them. If their persuasive weight is sufficient, they will find their way into an objective assessment without the need for further support. If they do not, they should be rejected irrespective of the support included. 'Veritas vincit' (May truth prevail). He published were several further treatises, drilling down into individual points arising from the legal reforms of 1810 and their unfolding aftermath. The civil law topics treated in this way were those in respect of French ci8vil law presented particular difficulty to his law students in Baden, such as matrimonial property, family law, liens, possession and limitation periods. Although these treatises were intended only to clarify matters for his own students, they were disseminated more widely and acquired greater significance than anticipated for the discipline and practical application of civil law Jurisprudence in Baden and subsequently, by extrapolation, in Germany.

=== Top judge ===
During 1844/45 Stabel served a term as university pro-rector, and in April 1845 he resigned his remaining public appointment as director of the Freiburg District Court. However, the time he was able to devote to lecturing at the university was further curtailed in April 1847 when he accepted the "third seat" as a vice-chancellor at the High Court for Baden (which was located at Mannheim between 1810 and 1871). Sources insist that on account both of his personality and of his formidable reputation in legal circles, his influence on the direction and judgements of the high court quickly surpassed by far that of the Chief Judge.

=== 1848 ===
The uprising which had erupted in March 1848 and its political aftermath continued to resonate across the Grand Duchy through the rest of 1848 and the first half of 1849. During the first week of June 1849 a large number of senior and middle level members of the government were removed resigned. After several weeks of intensifying uncertainty, on 21 June 1849 Anton Stabel filled one of the resulting vacancies: he accepted a position as President of the Ministry for the Interior and Justice. He took over his new responsibilities at a difficult time. The so-called May revolution had upended the national order, and the putting down of the insurrection was far from complete. Karlsruhe and Rastatt were still controlled by republican insurrectionists till July 1849, when troops from Prussia enforced the return of Karlsruhe to the control of the Grand Duke and his government. Despite immediate pressure for a reactionary backlash, the next few years were years of progressive reform and modernisation of the justice system, much of it responding to the demands that liberal revolutionaries had put forward in 1848. Stabel took a leading role in the implementation of reforms, both during his two year stint at the justice ministry and subsequently.

=== At the interface of government and the justice system ===
In 1849/50 Stabel was elected to membership of the Erfurt parliament. The unification project of which the election was a part, came to nothing at this stage, however. In October 1851 he resigned from the government and returned to the top echelons of the judiciary. The previous head of the judiciary, Baron von Stengel, had died in 1848 and his responsibilities had subsequently been undertaken by the former chancellor of the high court Christoph Trefurt, who had been retired in 1848 and then in 1849 summoned out of retirement to fill the post at least until a more lasting solution could be decided upon. Organisational changes at the high court already in the pipeline were implemented at the start of 1852. Stabel now served both as chairman of the judiciary and as judge at the high court in Mannheim till April 1860. From these two jobs he exercised a major influence on developments in the justice system through the 1850s.

In 1853 the Grand Duke appointed him to membership of the First Chamber of the "Landstände" (Baden's traditional quasi-representative body). He was immediately appointed to the vice-presidency of the chamber. He was reappointed with each new session, successively in 1855, 1857 and 1859. The "Landstände" is sometimes termed in sources the "Landtag", but in the context of the 1850s that can be a somewhat anachronistic term, because it implies that the "Landstände" was a form of proto-parliament. The assembly lacked the basic democratic credentials associated with a twentieth century parliament, but it did represent a bridge between, on the one side, the prince or duke and his government and, on the other side, the society and societal institutions which over which they governed. As a leader in the assembly Stabel was in a position to straddle the bridge between the government and the governed, and to develop an acute understanding of both. Another of Stabel's side-lines for several years, starting in 1854, was the presidency of the commission responsible for the newly introduced Level 2 state law exams. Admirers assert that he was the principal designer of the syllabus and examination, broadly as they still existed across Germany twenty years after unification. (Note: The most recent of the sources cited here was published in 1893.) He thereby created a practical test designed to demonstrate the ability, on the part of young lawyers, to apply theoretical knowledge correctly across the great range of practical situations which they might expect to come across in practice.

=== Concordat crisis ===
1860 was a particularly important year both for the development and for the modernisation of government in the Grand Duchy of Baden and in the career of Anton Stabel. It was the year that marked Stabel's final transfer from the higher echelons of the judiciary to the higher echelons of government. The catalyst for that was church-state relations. On 28 June 1859 a convention was concluded with the Church Curia in Rome which was intended to put an end to a decade of tension and conflict between Baden and the church. In Baden the agreement was published by means of a decree dated 5 December 1859. On 24 November 1859 the text of the convention was passed to the First Chamber, with the comment added that "in view of the legislative changes [necessary in Baden and in Rome] special schedules would be submitted to the Landstände". Across the country and in the Landstände themselves, immediate outrage followed, which was linked to immediate opposition to the agreement with Rome. It was believed that church-state relations could only be ordered or amended with the consent of the Landstände. The belief was strengthened by the fact that most of the constitutional amendments included in the agreement involved matters already dealt with under Section 65 of the Constitution. On 30 March 1860 the Second Chamber agreed an address to the Grand Duke requesting that "the ordinance of 5 December 1859 should be set aside". By that time Anton Stabel, in the context of (or possibly exceeding) his responsibilities as Rapporteur for the First Chamber, had produced his own proposals for resolving the accelerating constitutional crisis.

=== Head of government ===
During March 1860 Anton Stabel published his "Foundations for the Commission Report on the Convention with the Holy See" ("Grundlagen für den Commissionsbericht über die Convention mit dem päpstlichen Stuhl"). It was intended as a key discussion document for the First Chamber, but before any such discussion took place there came a decisive development on 2 April 1860: the Grand Duke, following the advice of his friend and advisor Baron Franz von Roggenbach following the submission from the Second Chamber of 30 March 1860, dismissed the Stengel-Meysenbug government, and in the words of one source "released its senior members into retirement". A new government was installed the same day, in which Anton Stabel held various posts including President of the Ministry of State, Minister for Justice and Minister for Foreign Affairs. Although the term was not yet in common parlance, he was in more modern terms "Minister President" and the leading figure in the government. Nevertheless, the Grand Duke and his advisors required that Prof. Dr. August Lamey, a liberal lawyer the leading spokesman for the opponents of the convention in the Second Chamber, should also join the government. Lamey, who was a leading advocate for full separation of church and state, took charge at the Ministry of the Interior.

The new government arranged the Grand Duke's proclamation of 7 April 1860 which was greeted with enthusiasm across the country. The burning issues of church politics would now be regulated by law in a manner that was friendly towards the church. The church too, in some respects immediately and in some respects shortly afterwards, reconciled itself to the new structure. Stabel himself had already given the issues much thought and his views on them had been published to the First Chamber and thereby more broadly the previous month. He took a lead in drafting the new legislation on this and other key matters touching the lives of citizens.

Matters which absorbed the largest proportion of his activity involved the justice system. He retained the justice portfolio throughout his six years as head of government, while for other portfolios, notably those covering foreign policy and liaison with the court, others took on the duties involved in 1861. Following through with a piece of legislation on which governments had been working since 1851, and based originally on a draft document dating back to 1845, a new judicial constitution since 1851, and based originally on a draft document dating back to 1845, a new judicial constitution was developed and conducted through the first and second chambers of the Landstände between 1861 and 1864. It included prescriptive procedural regulations for civil and criminal trials and a procedural code for lawyers. The law entered into force on 1 October 1864, delivering to Baden a justice system thoroughly modern in its approach, meeting both the requirements of Jurisprudence and the practical requirements of justice and efficiency. There was, predictably in view of Stabel's known preferences, a new emphasis on oral pleadings heard in public. In less serious criminal cases there was provision for hearings before panels of five judges well trained in the law: criminal cases of greater seriousness were to be heard before judges, while the most serious criminal cases were to be sent for a jury trial. As far as civil litigation was concerned, this was to be dealt with, at first instance, by collegial courts for important matters and by local courts for less significant cases. With this organisational structure the Grand Duchy of Baden created, during the early 1860s, almost exactly the same justice system as that which would be adopted by post-unification Germany fifteen years later.

War clouds returned shortly after the completion of the justice system reforms. In October 1865 Franz von Roggenbach retired from the Foreign Ministry over which he had presided since 1861, to be succeeded by Baron von Edelsheim, a top diplomat of long experience. As Prussia's dispute with Austria turned into war, the government of Baden under Stabel's leadership pursued a resolutely law-based approach. The government enjoyed full support in this respect from the First and Second Chambers and from the army. Any other attitude would have been unthinkable in view of the popular mood and the geographical position of Baden and its neighboring states. The political tradition of the Grand Duchy had been strongly liberal ever since its creation back in 1806. There was no sympathy for the intensified quasi-diplomatic manoevrings of the Prussian leadership since 1864.

By early July 1866 the differences between Austria-Hungary and Prussia had been settled on the battlefields of Bohemia. By the end of that month there were Prussian troops occupying parts of Baden and Stabel's government had resigned. A new government under Karl Mathy took over on 27 July 1866. ( Mathy, unlike his senior government colleagues, had favoured the Prussian side in the recent war.) Stable resigned from the government and went into retirement. In February 1867 he was persuaded to return, serving as Minister for Justice in Mathy's cabinet. However, after Mathy died in February 1868, a replacement government under Julius Jolly took over. Jolly came from a new political generation: he had been close to Mathy but never to Stabel, and this time, when Anton Stabel retired from government on 13 February 1868, his retirement was permanent.

=== Later years ===
Stabel now returned to private life, but he continued to live in the capital, Karlsruhe. His professional focus was now exclusively on legal work. During his later years at the High Court judiciary he had already undertaken some work of the "Jahrbücher für Badisches Recht. Als erweiterte Fortsetzung der oberhofgerichtlichen Jahrbücher", an extended version of the Year Book for the Baden High Court, and in 1867 the first volume of it was published. It contained a considerable number of thoughtful and interesting contributions from Stabel's own pen. A more substantial scholarly work, "Institutionen des französischen Zivilrechts", followed in 1871. He had been working on this book for some time, and its completion caused him some difficulty since by this time his eyes were starting to fail. In 1876 he underwent a cataract operation.

Anton Stabel became Anton von Stabel in April 1877, being among those reaised to the nobility to celebrate the twenty-fifth anniversary of the Grand Duke's reign.

Narrowly predeceased by his wife, Anton von Stabel died from Pneumonia on 22 March 1880.
