= Heinrich Köhler =

German politician

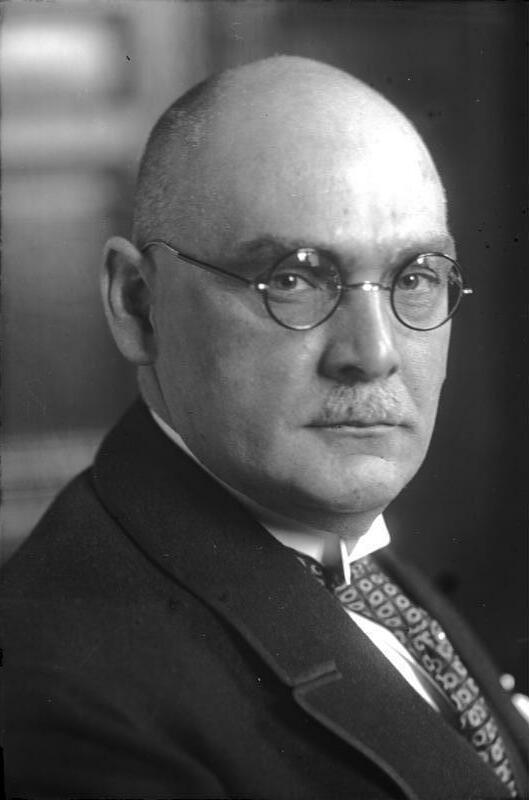
Heinrich Köhler in 1928

Franz Heinrich Köhler (29 September 1878 – 6 February 1949) was a German politician who served as Minister of Finance of the Weimar Republic in 1927/8. He also was the head of state (Staatspräsident) of the Republic of Baden in 1923/4 and 1926/7.

== Early life ==
Köhler was born on 29 September 1878 in Karlsruhe as the son of Karl Joseph Köhler (1847-1907) and Regina Köhler, née Helfrich (1854-1940). After finishing school (Unterprima) he started to work for the customs service of the Grand Duchy of Baden. By way of Catholic associations he became a politician of the Zentrum. In 1911, he was made a member of the Karlsruhe city council (Stadtverordnetenversammlung). In 1913, he became a member of the 2nd chamber of the Baden Landesstände (estates or parliament). In 1915-18, during World War I, he was seconded to work as a customs official in German-occupied Belgium.

== Political career in the Weimar Republic ==
Following the German Revolution Köhler, who was a friend of Joseph Wirth and belonged to the Zentrum's left wing, supported the party's involvement in the revolutionary Baden Provisional People's Government (Badische vorläufige Volksregierung) and initially worked as the government's chief press officer.

Following the resignation of the USPD ministers in early 1919, Köhler became a Staatsrat and head of cabinet for the president of the Republic, Anton Geiss. In 1920 he succeeded Wirth as Baden Minister of Finance, a position he held until 1927. In 1923/4 and 1926/7, he was also the head of state of Baden, or Staatspräsident. In January 1927, Köhler became Reich Minister of Finance in the fourth cabinet of chancellor Wilhelm Marx (January 1927 to June 1928) and had to resign his posts in Baden.

From 1928 until the summer of 1932 Köhler was a member of the Reichstag.

== Later life ==
In 1932, Köhler left active politics and worked in the private economy until the start of World War II. After the war, Köhler joined the Christian Democratic Union of Germany (CDU) and in September 1945 succeeded Karl Holl as head of the civilian administration in U.S.-occupied Baden.

Following the merger of Nordbaden and Nord-Württemberg, he became Deputy Minister President of the government at Stuttgart. In spring 1946, Köhler became Minister of the Economy and in December 1946 Minister of Finance. He held that office, as well as that of Landespräsident of Nordbaden, until his death.

In addition, Köhler was a member of the Länderrat of the U.S. occupation zone and (for a short period in 1947) the representative of Württemberg-Baden in the Executive Council of the (American/British) bizone. He left the latter to protest positions taken by Konrad Adenauer and Ludwig Erhard.

Köhler was married twice, to Rosa Hauck (b. 1878, d. 1911) and Elsa Förster (b. 1887, d. 1978). He had two sons from his first marriage, as well as two sons and a daughter from the second.

Köhler died in Karlsruhe on 6 February 1949.

== Works ==
- Finanzen des Reichs, der Länder und Gemeinden (with A. Bund), in: Staatslexikon, II, 1927, pp. 4;
- Lebenserinnerungen des Politikers und Staatsmannes Heinrich Köhler, 1878-1949, ed. by J. Becker, 1964.

Political offices
Preceded by Gustav Trunk	State President of Baden; 1926–1927	Succeeded by Gustav Trunk
Preceded by Adam Remmele	State President of Baden; 1923–1924	Succeeded by Willy Hellpach
