= Remmele =

Remmele is a surname. Notable people with the name include:

- Adam Remmele (1877–1951), German politician
- Hermann Remmele (1880–1939), German politician
