= Imprimatur GmbH =

- Company type: Gesellschaft mit beschränkter Haftung
- Industry: Newspaper
- Founded: 1900; 125 years ago
- Defunct: 1943
- Headquarters: Frankfurt, Germany
- Products: Frankfurter Zeitung

The Imprimatur GmbH was a company which owned the Frankfurt newspaper Frankfurter Zeitung (FZ) from 1930 until it was shut down in 1943. During the period that FZ was owned by the Imprimatur, the prestigious newspaper was in financial distress situations and brought the company heavy losses.

The Imprimatur was founded in 1900 by Rudolf and Hermann Ullstein. In 1924, they sold the company to two investors: Carl Bosch, chairman of the board of IG Farben, and Dr. Hermann Hummel, who also served on the supervisory board of IG Farben. Six years later, Bosch sold his shares, leaving Hummel as the sole shareholder of the Imprimatur.

The company was later sold to the prominent banking family of Leopold Sonnemann. Although the paper was initially protected by the Nazis, as it provided a convenient medium for propaganda, it was shut down by Adolf Hitler in 1943. The company subsequently went defunct.

In 1930, Hermann Hummel took over all the shares in Imprimatur GmbH and Carl Bosch was thus able to support the Frankfurter Zeitung with financial resources without being directly involved. As the financial situation of the Frankfurter Zeitung continued to be very difficult in the following years, Imprimatur increased its share in Frankfurter Societäts GmbH to 97.92 percent in 1934. Imprimatur GmbH was also a shareholder in the Frankfurter Zeitung.

After the end of World War II, Imprimatur GmbH was converted into a foundation, which merged with the Fazit Foundation in 1989.
