= Friedrich Jolly =

German neurologist and psychiatrist (1844–1904)

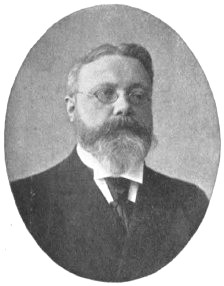
Friedrich Jolly (1898 photo)

Friedrich Jolly (24 November 1844 – 4 January 1904) was a German neurologist and psychiatrist who was a native of Heidelberg, and the son of physicist Philipp von Jolly (1809–1884).

He studied medicine at the University of Göttingen under Georg Meissner (1829–1905), and in 1867 received his doctorate at the Ludwig-Maximilians-Universität München. In 1868, he became an assistant to Bernhard von Gudden (1824–1886) and Hubert von Grashey (1839–1914) at the mental institution in Werneck, and in 1870 was an assistant to Franz von Rinecker (1811–1883) at the Juliusspital at the University of Würzburg.

In 1873, Jolly became director of the psychiatric clinic in Strasbourg, where he was named as successor to Richard von Krafft-Ebing (1840–1902). In 1890, he succeeded Karl Friedrich Otto Westphal (1833–1890) as director of the neuropsychiatric clinic at the Berlin Charité.

Jolly is remembered for his pioneer research of myasthenia gravis, including the electrophysiological aspects involving abnormal fatigue associated with the disease which forms the basis of Jolly's test. He is credited with coining the term myasthenia gravis pseudoparalytica for the disorder.

He was the author of an influential treatise on hypochondria that was published in Hugo Wilhelm von Ziemssen's "Handbuch der speciellen Pathologie und Therapie". His "Untersuchungen über den elektrischen Leitungswiderstand des menschlichen Körpers" (1884) was fundamental to the study of electrical diagnostics.

His grave is preserved in the Protestant Friedhof III der Jerusalems- und Neuen Kirchengemeinde (Cemetery No. III of the congregations of Jerusalem's Church and New Church) in Berlin-Kreuzberg, south of Hallesches Tor.
