= Philipp Carl =

German physicist (1837-1891)

- Born: Philipp Franz Heinrich Carl; 19 June 1837; Neustadt an der Aisch, Kingdom of Bavaria
- Died: 24 January 1891 (aged 53)
- Education: Ludwig-Maximilians-Universität München
- Scientific career
- Fields: Physics
- Workplaces: Royal Bavarian Military Training Institutes
- Doctoral advisor: Philipp von Jolly; Johann von Lamont

Philipp Franz Heinrich Carl (19 June 1837 – 24 January 1891) was a German physicist.

He was born at Neustadt, Middle Franconia. He studied the exact sciences at the Ludwig-Maximilians-Universität München as a doctorate student of Philipp von Jolly and Johann von Lamont (graduation 1860). He then worked as an assistant to Lamont, performing astronomical and geophysical research at the observatory (Universitäts-Sternwarte München). In 1865, he established, and for several years thereafter directed, a workshop for the manufacture of mathematical instruments. In 1869, he was named professor of physics at the Royal Bavarian Military Training Institutes.

== Publications ==
He established also the Repertoriums der Experimentalphysik, der physikalischen Technik und der astronomischen Instrumentenkunde in 1865, which he edited until 1882. His published works include:

- Die Principien der astronomischen Instrumentenkunde (1863).
- Repertorium der Kometenastronomie (1864).
