= Reinhold Maier =

German politician (1889–1971)

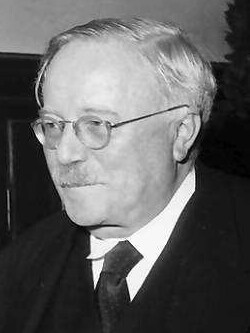
- Maier in 1952

Minister-President of Baden-Württemberg
- In office 25 April 1952 – 30 September 1953
- Deputy: Hermann Veit
- Preceded by: himself (as Minister-President of Württemberg-Baden); Gebhard Müller (as Minister-President of Württemberg-Hohenzollern); Leo Wohleb (as Minister-President of Baden)
- Succeeded by: Gebhard Müller

Minister-President of Württemberg-Baden
- In office 19 September 1945 – 25 April 1952
- Deputy: Fritz Ulrich; Josef Beyerle; Hermann Veit
- Preceded by: Walter Köhler (as Minister-President of the Republic of Baden); Christian Mergenthaler (as Minister-President of the Free People's State of Württemberg)
- Succeeded by: himself (as Minister-President of Baden-Württemberg)
Parliamentary constituencies
Member of the Bundestag for Baden-Württemberg
In office 15 October 1957 – 30 September 1959
Preceded by	multi-member district
Succeeded by	Klaus Freiherr von Mühlen
Constituency	Free Democratic Party List
In office 6 October 1953 – 14 May 1956
Preceded by	multi-member district
Succeeded by	Fritz Weber
Constituency	Free Democratic Party List
Member of the Landtag of Baden-Württemberg for Waiblingen II
In office 17 March 1961 – 10 June 1964
Preceded by	himself
Succeeded by	Heinz Bühringer
In office 25 March 1952 – 6 February 1961
Preceded by	Constituency established
Succeeded by	himself
Member of the Landtag of Württemberg-Baden
In office 10 December 1946 – 30 May 1952
Preceded by	Constituency established
Succeeded by	Constituency abolished
Member of the Reichstag for Free People's State of Württemberg
In office 6 December 1932 – 12 December 1933
Preceded by	multi-member district
Succeeded by	Constituency abolished

President of the German Bundesrat
- In office 7 September 1952 – 6 September 1953
- Preceded by: Hinrich Wilhelm Kopf
- Succeeded by: Georg August Zinn

Personal details
- Born: 16 October 1889 Schorndorf, Kingdom of Württemberg, German Empire (now Baden-Württemberg, Germany)
- Died: 19 August 1971 (aged 81) Stuttgart, Baden-Württemberg, West Germany (now Germany)
- Resting place: Alter Friedhof, Schorndorf
- Party: Free Democratic Party (1948–1971)
- Other political affiliations: Democratic People's Party (1945–1948); German State Party (1930–1933); German Democratic Party (1918–1930); Progressive People's Party (1912–1918)
- Spouse: Gerta Goldschmidt
- Education: Grenoble Alpes University; University of Tübingen; University of Heidelberg (Dr. jur.)
- Occupation: Politician; Lawyer
- Awards: Grand Cross of the Order of Merit of the Federal Republic of Germany

Military service
- Allegiance: Kgm. of Württemberg
- Unit: Fußartillerie-Regiment 13
- Battles/wars: First World War

Reinhold Maier (16 October 1889 – 19 August 1971) was a German politician and the leader of the FDP from 1957–1960. From 1946 to 1952 he was Minister President of Württemberg-Baden and then the 1st Minister President of the new state of Baden-Württemberg until 1953.

He served as the 4th President of the Bundesrat in 1952/53, the only FDP politician in German history to do so to date.

Maier was born in Schorndorf.

== Early life ==
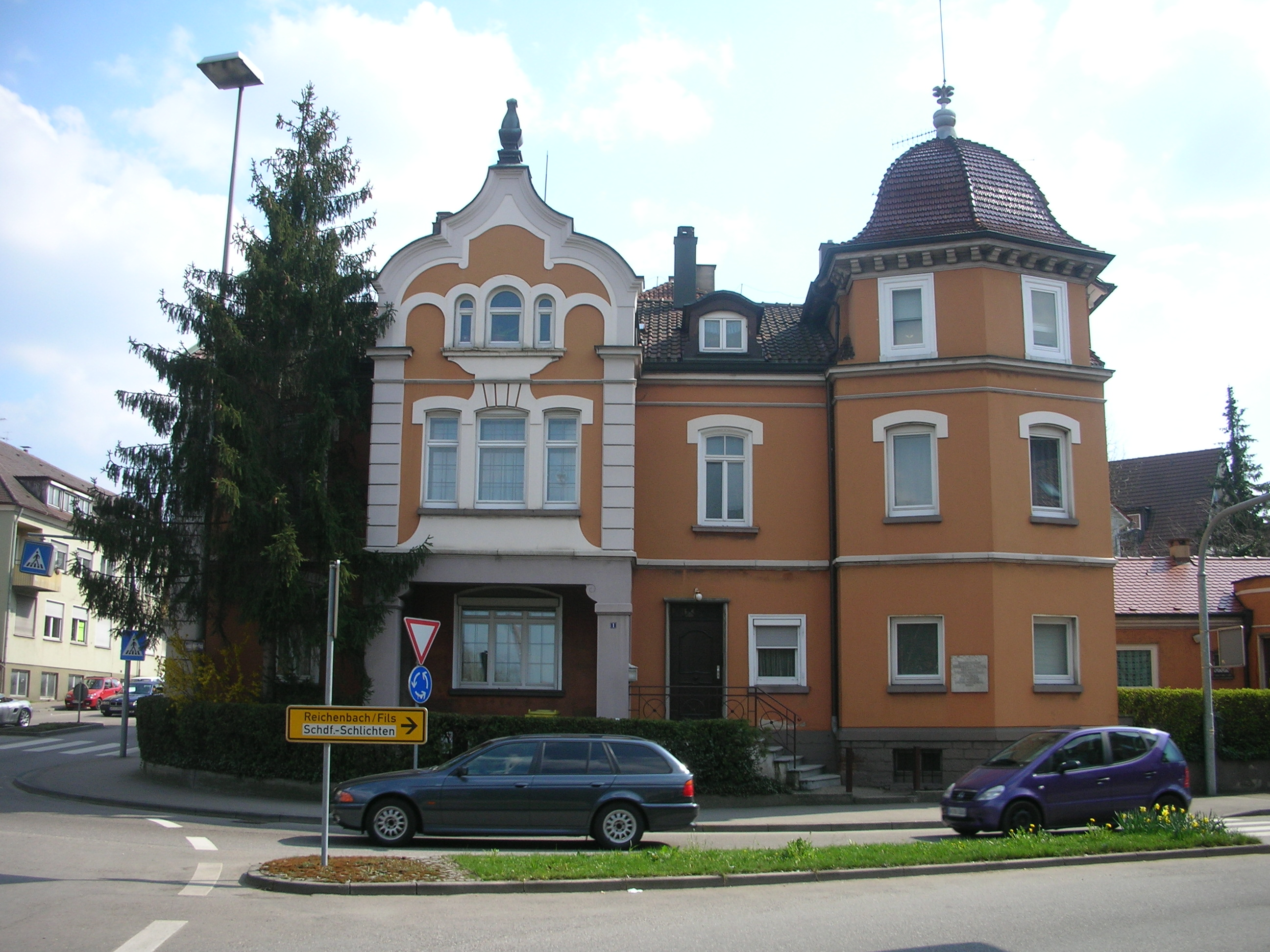
Reinhold-Maier-Geburtshaus (childhood home)

Maier, a Protestant, was born the son of a municipal architect, Gottlieb Maier, in Schorndorf.

After attending grammar school in Schorndorf, Reinhold Maier attended the Dillmann-Gymnasium in Stuttgart and, in 1907, received his Abitur. He then studied law at the University of Grenoble and at the University of Tübingen. There he was a member of the South German (and liberally inclined) Tübingen fraternity "Academic Society Stuttgardia Tübingen". Here he met fellow aspiring politicians such as Eberhard Wildermuth, Karl Georg Pfleiderer, Konrad Wittwer and Wolfgang Haussmann. He received his doctorate in law in Heidelberg. During the First World War he took part as a soldier at the foot artillery regiment 13. In 1920 he settled in Stuttgart and practiced as a lawyer. In 1924 he was inducted into the Masonic Lodge "Zu den 3 cedars" in Stuttgart. During the Nazi era he worked as a lawyer; his wife Gerta Goldschmidt flew to the United Kingdom with their two children. Reinhold Maier was forced to divorce her under Nazi pressure but remarried her after the war in 1946.

== Career ==
Already a member of the Progressive People's Party (Germany) (FVP) since 1912, Maier joined the newly formed left-wing liberal German Democratic Party (DDP) in 1918. In 1924 he became chairman of the Stuttgart District Association of DDP.

In 1945 Maier participated in the founding of the Democratic People's Party (Germany) (DVP), not to be confused with the German People's Party of the Weimar Republic. The DVP was absorbed by the FDP in 1948.

Maier became Minister President of "Württemberg-Baden", a constituent state of the subsequent "Land" of Baden-Württemberg in 1945, following the collapse of the Nazi regime, which in its twilight had claimed the life of his former boss, the last elected Minister President Eugen Bolz, one of the 20 July Plot conspirators. As such, he preceded the West German state by setting up a constitutional democratic system in competition with the burgeoning SPD and communist parties, and the French and American occupation authorities. Despite his DVP party consistently polling fewer votes than Christian Democratic and socialist opponents, Maier steadfastly maintained coalitions with the liberals as the leading party.

After the formation of the coalition of FDP / DVP, SPD and All-German Bloc/League of Expellees and Deprived of Rights (BHE) under his leadership, simultaneous to the creation of the new state of Baden-Württemberg in 1952, the Hesse FDP Association requested the expulsion of Maier and the state chairman Wolfgang Haussmann (1903–1989) from the party along with the separation of the DVP from the FDP, but the coup was not successful. From 1957 to 1960 he was Chairman of the FDP, and then until his death honorary chairman.

== Deputy ==
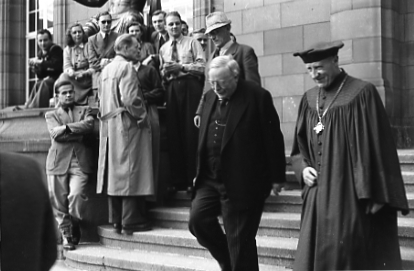
Sigurd Janssen and Reinhold Maier, Freiburg University 1952

Maier was 1932–1933 a member of parliament for the German State Party. At the same time he was from 1932 to 1933 a member of the Württemberg Landtag. On 23 March 1933, he voted for the Enabling Act together with the other four liberal Reichstag deputies Hermann Dietrich, Theodor Heuss, Heinrich Landahl, and Ernst Lemmer. The final sentence of his speech was: For the sake of people and country and in anticipation of a legitimate development, we will rescind our serious concerns and approve the Enabling Act. According to the informations of Theodor Heuss in his memoirs, the five liberal Reichstag deputies have initially been divided with respect to the Enabling Act. Heuss had formulated two explanations, one for rejection, one for abstention. At his side, however, was only Hermann Dietrich. Heinrich Landahl, Ernst Lemmer and Reinhold Maier voted in the Reichstag group for approval. Heuss and Dietrich were overruled, so then all Liberal MPs voted for the Enabling Act. In the Weimar Republic Maier was a member of the German Democratic Party (DDP). In 1945 he was a founder of the Democratic People's Party (DVP), which is now the Baden-Württemberg-Organisation of the FDP.

He died in Stuttgart.
