= Jolly balance =

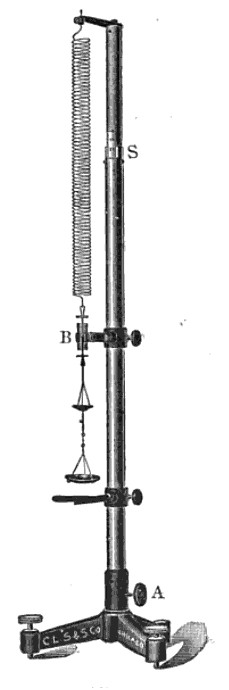
A Jolly balance from 1913

The Jolly balance is an instrument for determining specific gravities. Invented by the German physicist Philipp von Jolly in 1864, it consists of a spring fastened at the top to a movable arm. At the lower end, the spring is provided with two small pans, one suspended beneath the other. The lower pan is kept immersed to the same depth in water, while the other one hangs in the air. On the upright stand behind the spring is a mirror on which is engraved or painted a scale of equal parts. The specific gravity of an object, typically a solid, is determined by noting how much the spring lengthens when the object is resting in the upper pan in air ($w$), and then when the object is moved to the lower pan and immersed in water ($w'$). The specific gravity is $\frac{w}{(w - w')}$.

== See also ==
- Effective mass (spring-mass system)
