= Hermann Hummel =

German chemist and politician (1876–1952)

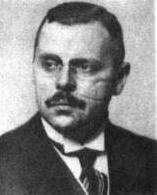
- Hummel in 1924

State President of Baden
- In office 1921–1922
- Preceded by: Gustav Trunk
- Succeeded by: Adam Remmele

Personal details
- Born: 22 June 1876; Lahr, Grand Duchy of Baden
- Died: 13 September 1952 (aged 76); Krefeld, Germany
- Political party: DDP
- Occupation: Chemist, politician

Hermann Hummel (22 June 1876 – 13 September 1952) was a German chemist and politician in the Republic of Baden. He was a member of the DDP.

== Early life and career ==
Hummel was born in Lahr in the Grand Duchy of Baden. He studied astronomy, chemistry, mathematics and philosophy at the universities of Heidelberg, Freiburg im Breisgau, and Strasbourg. He simultaneously completed a degree in engineering at the Technical University of Karlsruhe. He later became a chemistry teacher at a high school in Karlsruhe and thus began his teaching career. In 1906, Hummel moved up to teach chemistry at a secondary school in Karlsruhe. It was not long after this that he began to put his knowledge of chemistry to practical use. From 1912 to 1914, he worked in a paint factory, Electra Werke GmbH.

At the outbreak of the First World War, he joined as a war volunteer in the field artillery regiment No. 27. He continued to serve as a lieutenant of the reserve from 1915 until 1917. During this time, he participated in fighting on both the Eastern and Western Fronts. From 1917 until the end of the war, he worked in the inspection of Air Force troops.

== Chemist and businessman ==
In late 1922, Hummel joined the administration of the Badische Anilin and Soda Fabrik. He served as one of the directors and a member of the supervisory board of the company. Subsequently, he participated in the construction of IG Farben in Frankfurt am Main, in whose supervisory board he also participated. In addition, he was a member of the supervisory board of the August Horch automobile plants in Zwickau GmbH and was a member of the Economic Policy Committee of the National Association of German Industry.

By 1930, Hummel was the sole shareholder of Imprimatur GmbH and tried to financially support the opposition newspaper Frankfurter Zeitung against the propaganda machine of the Nazi Party and Joseph Goebbels. In addition to his activities in the economy, he was a member of the Kaiser Wilhelm Society for the Advancement of Sciences, the Society of Friends of the Technical University of Karlsruhe and the Institute of Social Studies at the Ruprecht-Karls University of Heidelberg. In 1939, he emigrated to the United States, but he returned to Germany in 1951 and settled down in the Rhineland, where he lived until his death in Krefeld the following year at the age of 78.

== State President of Baden ==
Upon the proclamation of the Republic of Baden in 1918, Hummel first served as Deputy Minister for Military Affairs. On 1 April 1919, he was appointed Minister of Culture and Teaching.

On 23 November 1921, Hummel led a coalition of the SPD, the Centre, and the DDP. The coalition collapsed on 23 November 1922.

Political offices
Preceded by Gustav Trunk	State President of Baden; 1921–1922	Succeeded by Adam Remmele
