= Landstände =

Territorial diets of the Holy Roman Empire

The Landstände (singular Landstand) or Landtage (singular Landtag) were the various territorial estates or diets in the Holy Roman Empire in the Middle Ages and the early modern period, as opposed to their respective territorial lords (the Landesherrn).

== Usage ==
The structure of the Landstände was highly variable depending on the country and period of history. Furthermore, both the representatives of the older system, the Ständeordnung, where the estates were predominant, and the parliaments of the newer people's representative systems were called Landstände. The term Landtag was used, both under the Ständeordnung as well as the newer representative structures, for a general assembly of the estates or the parliament. The totality of the Landstände in a sovereign territory was also called the Landschaft.

In the older feudal system, the estates originally consisted of the assembly of deputies of the privileged estates of a country, the nobility and the clergy, who had joined together to form an organised body. Later, representatives of the towns were added. In some cases (for example, in Vienna, Württemberg or Mecklenburg), yeomen (Freibauer) were also given the right to participate as representatives of the peasants. An unusual exception were the estates in the land of Hadeln, which were formed almost exclusively of the farmers of large farms (Großbauer).

At the Landtage, the Landstände were divided into separate curiae (divisions). As a rule, three curiae were usually distinguished: the prelates, the knights and the towns. However, the early Landstände initially only represented the rights of their own estate and could only indirectly be considered to represent the whole population in their domain at the same time. In the Ständeordnungen, unlike absolutist systems of rule, the prince could not raise new taxes or adopt new laws outside his own personal estate (chamber goods or Kämmergüter) without the consent of the Landstände. In some cases, the estates also shared in the administration of justice and other public affairs. The limits of their powers were not usually accurately determined.

Sometimes, the term Landstände was retained even for the constitutional assemblies of newer representative systems, which in many countries took the place of the privileged assemblies of the Ständeordnung during the 19th century.

== History ==
=== Precursor ===
The Landstände first emerged in the 14th century, although the term itself was not used in Middle High German and was probably first translated later from the French word états. But it was not a new concept. The records of the Roman historian, Tacitus, show that co-determination was already being practised in the classical period at important public occasions. And according to the old Germanic law, public meetings and court hearings - the so-called things - were held, in the open. Even in the later Frankish Empire, alongside the general assemblies of the nobility and clergy, so-called placita are recorded; a form of representation of the people.

In individual tribes, for example the Bavarians and Saxons, there were such meetings too. However, these gatherings did not represent a formal grouping of the estates, as had evolved by the 14th century. Even the imperial and knightly assemblies and the state things of the 12th and 13th centuries were structures that dealt with the general welfare of the land, but these meetings still lacked the character of an independent body.

== Literature ==
- Kersten Krüger: Die landständische Verfassung. Munich, 2003, ISBN 3-486-55017-9 (Enzyklopädie deutscher Geschichte, 67).
