= Willy Hellpach =

German politician of the Weimar Republic

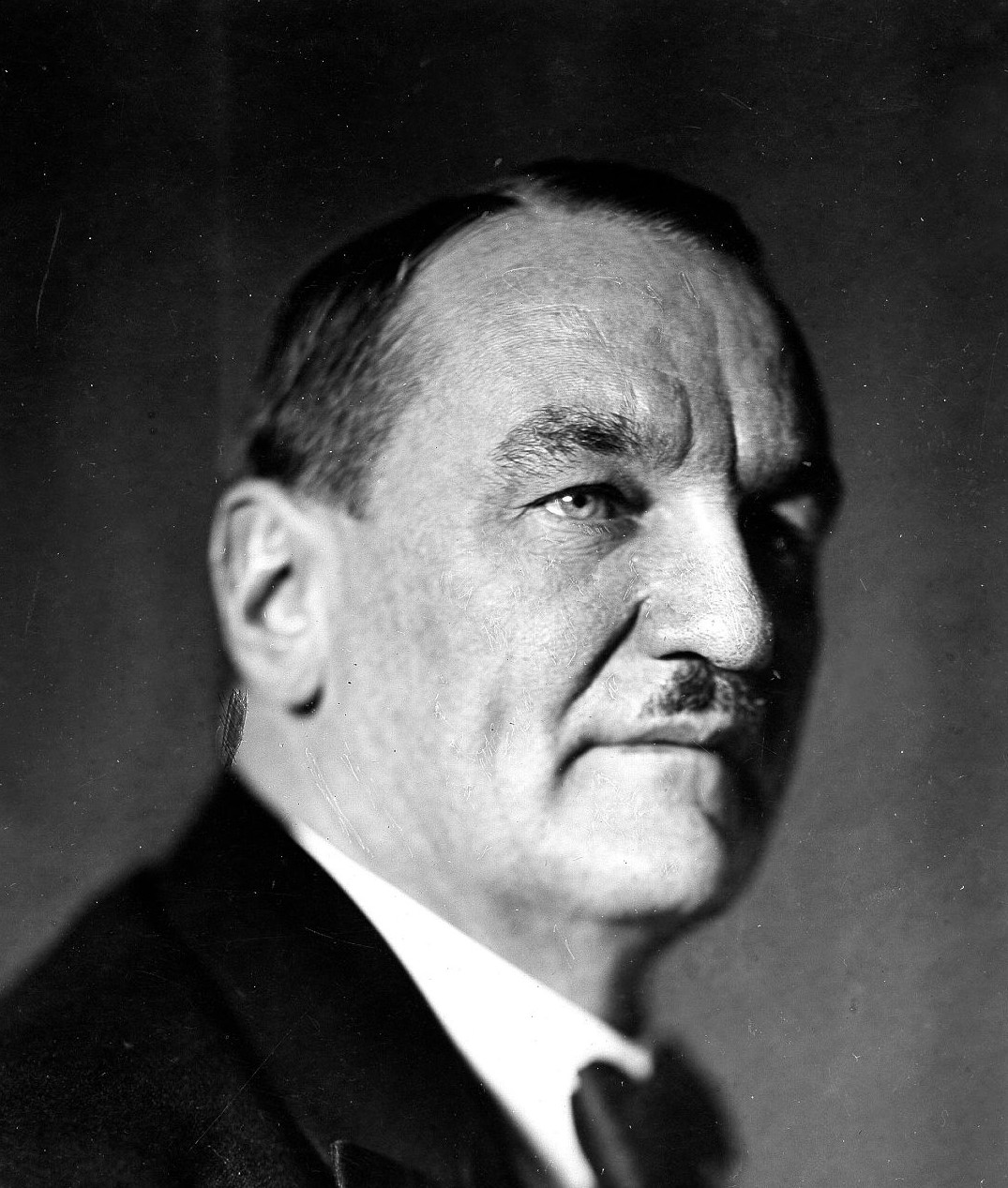
Willy Hellpach by Elli Lisser, 1931

Willy Hugo Hellpach (26 February 1877 in Oels, Silesia – 6 July 1955 in Heidelberg) was the sixth State President of Baden. He was a member of the German Democratic Party (DDP). He was also a physician and psychologist.

== Early life and education ==
Hellpach went to school in Greifswald to study medicine. Following his graduation in 1897, he went to Leipzig to study psychology. He received his doctorate and opened a practice in 1904. He served as a doctor in the First World War.

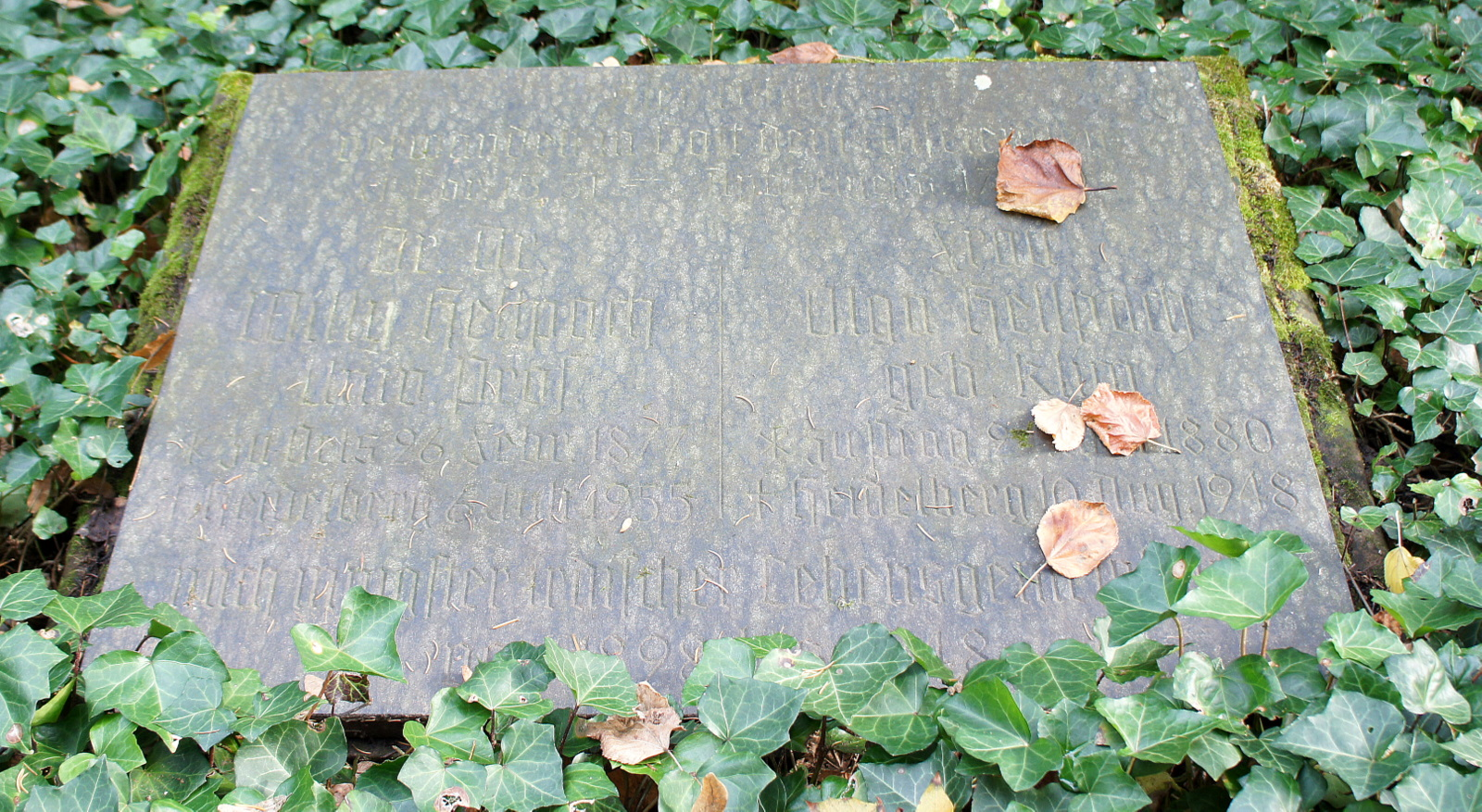
Hellpach's grave in Heidelberg

== Career ==
In 1918, he joined the DDP in Baden. In 1922, he became Minister for Teaching, and in 1924, with the surge of support to the DDP, became State President of Baden. In elections the following year, the Centre Party under Gustav Trunk regained their majority. Hellpach then ran for Reich President following the death of Friedrich Ebert, but only received 5.8% of the vote. Following a brief (1928–1930) seat in the Reichstag, Hellpach withdrew from politics.

He wrote a book Die Geopsychischen Erscheinungen: Wetter, Klima Und Landschaft In Ihrem Einfluss Auf Das Seelenleben (in 1911) (revised as Geopsyche in 1935) that is credited with being the first mention of the field of environmental psychology.

Preceded by Heinrich Köhler	State President of Baden; 1924–1925	Succeeded by Gustav Trunk
