= Sigismund von Reitzenstein =

German politician (1766–1847)

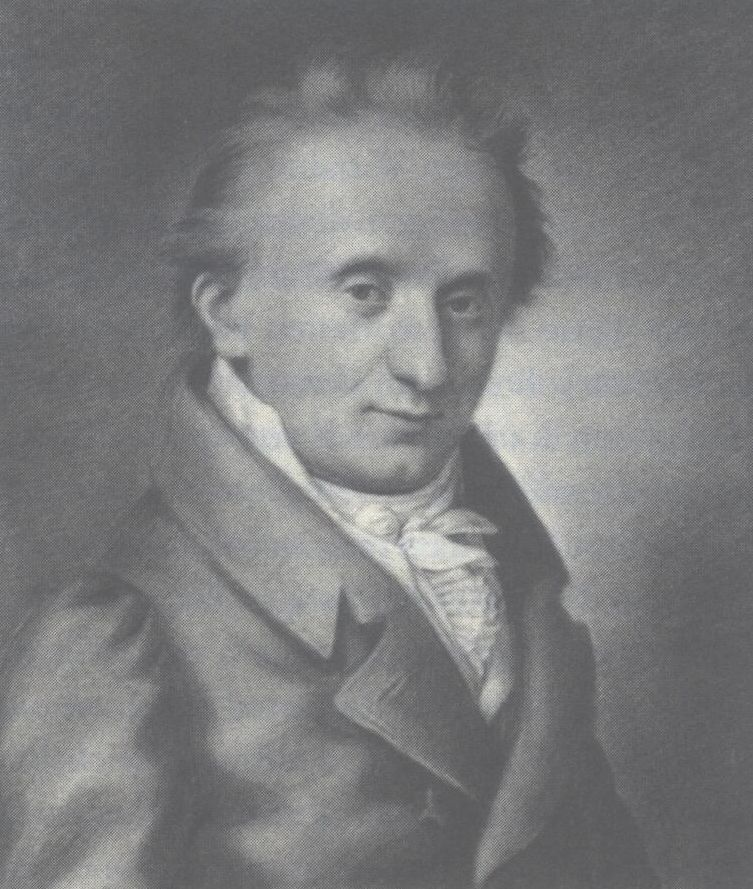
- Freiherr von Reitzenstein, Baden Politician, 1766-1847

Personal details
- Born: 3 February 1766 Nemmersdorf
- Died: 5 March 1847 (aged 81) Karlsruhe

Freiherr Sigismund Karl Johann von Reitzenstein (3 February 1766 in Nemmersdorf – 5 March 1847 in Karlsruhe) was the first minister of state of the Grand Duchy of Baden.

From 1781, Reitzenstein studied law in Göttingen and Erlangen before getting a position in the Principality of Bayreuth. In 1788 he took service in the Margravate of Baden in Karlsruhe. He advanced quickly, first taking part in the secret council of the court and then advancing to chamberlain in 1790 and bailif in Lörrach in 1792.

Reitzenstein did much to bring Baden closer to its powerful neighbor France. He struck a separate peace with France in Basel in August 1796. He then worked in Paris from 1797 to 1803 as ambassador of Baden. During this period, not only did Baden become an Electorate, Reitzenstein oversaw the quadrupling of the size of the duchy. Reitzenstein resigned his post in 1803.

Reitzenstein was named cabinet minister twice in 1805/1806 and 1809/1810. In 1806 he returned to Paris to negotiate the marriage of Charles, Grand Duke of Baden to Napoleon's adopted daughter, Stéphanie de Beauharnais. In November 1809, he reorganized the state into circles along the lines of the French departments.

From 1807 to 1809 and again in 1810, Reitzenstein was curator of the University of Heidelberg. There he had an important role in forming the educational policy of the state.
