= Johann von Lamont =

Scottish-German astronomer (1805–1879)

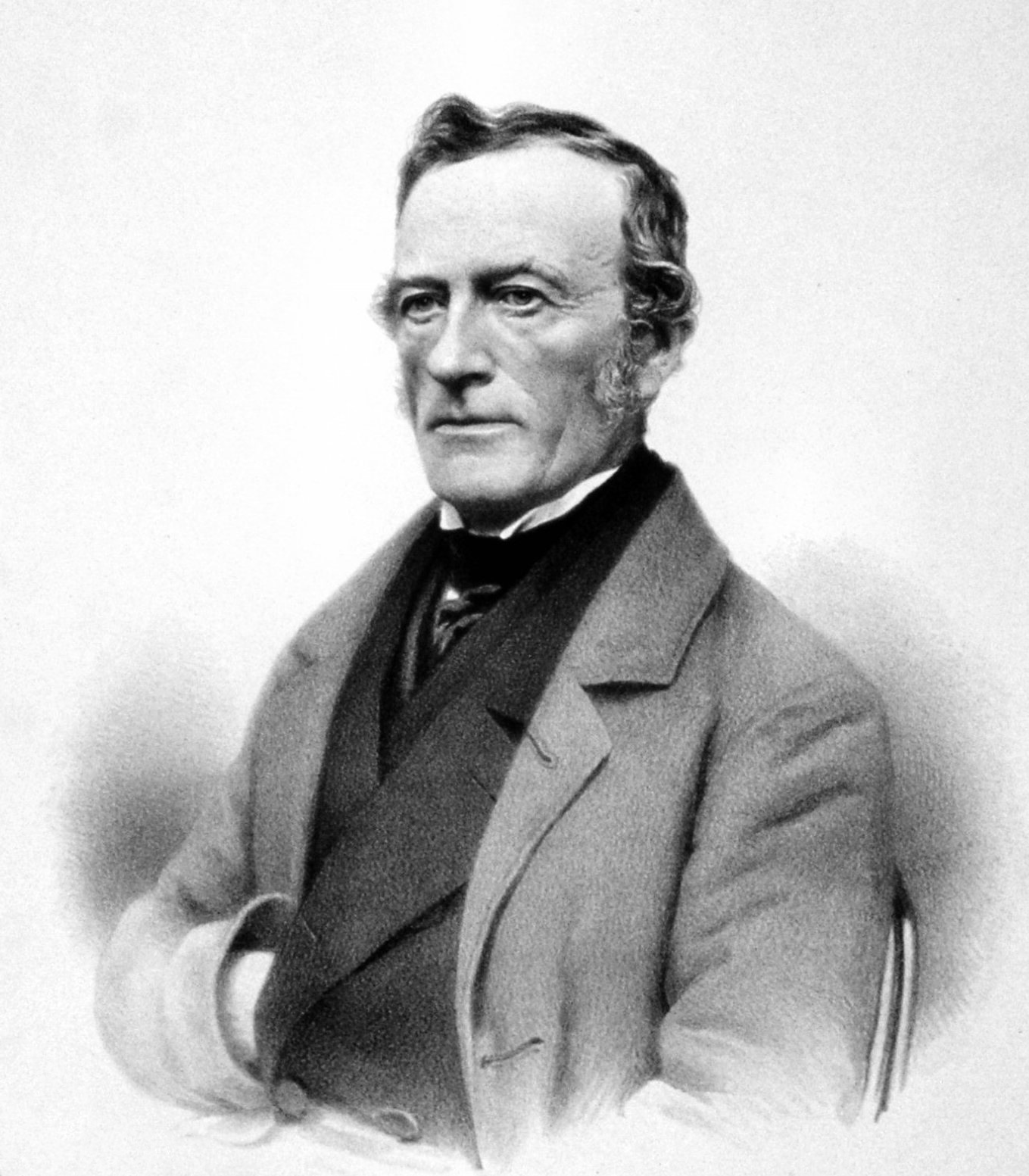
- Lamont in 1856
- Born: 13 December 1805; Corriemulzie, Scotland
- Died: 6 August 1879 (aged 73); Munich, Germany
- Known for: Magnetism of the Earth
- Scientific career
- Fields: Astronomy, physics
- Doctoral students: Philipp Carl

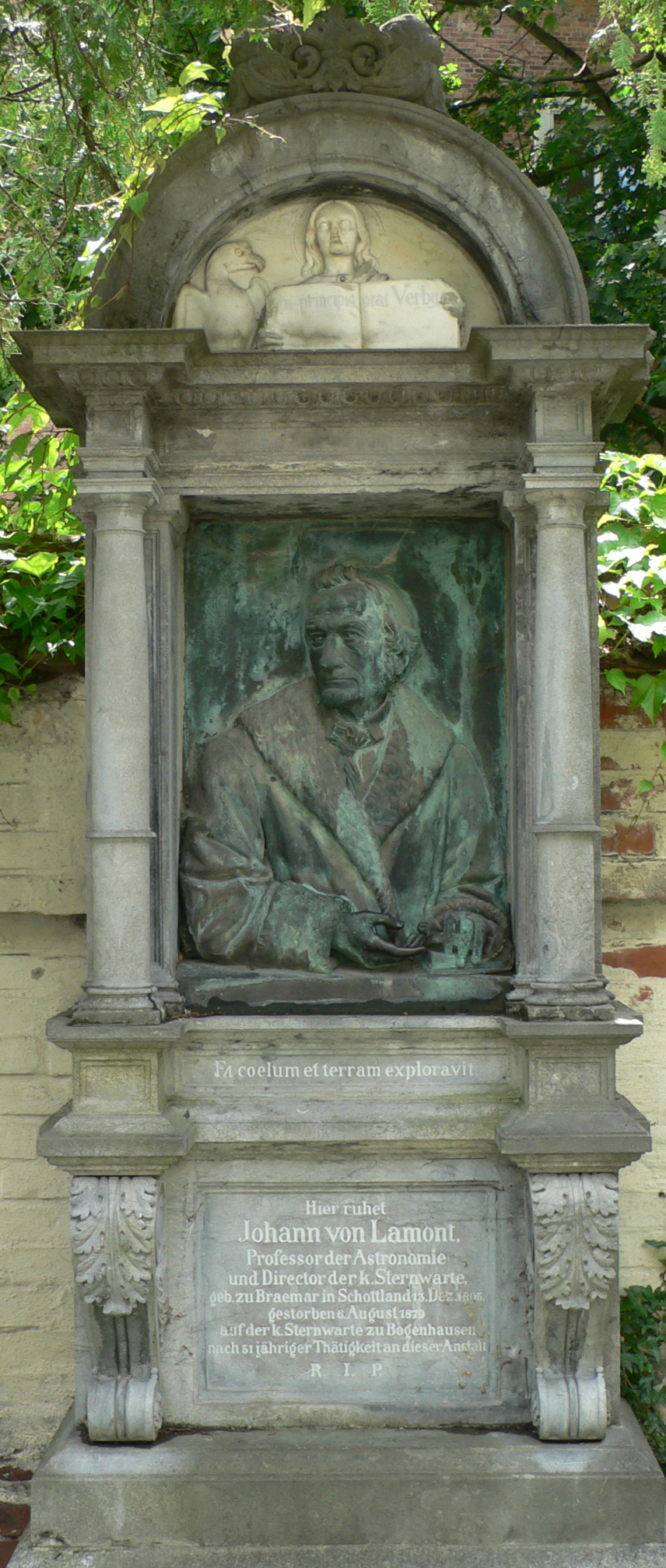
Tomb at the Cemetery of St. Georg, Munich – Bogenhausen

Johann von Lamont, FRSE (13 December 1805 – 6 August 1879), born John Lamont, was a Scottish-German astronomer and physicist.

== Biography ==
Lamont was born at Corriemulzie near Inverey in Aberdeenshire, Scotland. The son of Robert Lamont (forester to Earl Fife) and Elizabeth Ewan, his education began at the local school in Inverey, near Braemar. In 1817 his father died and John was sent to be educated at St James' monastery (Scots Benedictine College) at Regensburg, Germany. He began to work in astronomy and joined the Bogenhausen Observatory, became its director in 1835, took his doctorate of philosophy in 1830 and became professor of astronomy in 1852 at the Ludwig-Maximilians-Universität München. At the observatory he undertook the task of creating a star catalog that had about 35,000 entries.

In 1845, he was elected an Honorary Fellow of the Royal Society of Edinburgh.

His most important work was on the magnetism of the Earth. He performed magnetic surveys in Bavaria and northern Germany, France, Spain, and Denmark. He discovered a magnetic decennial period (ten-year cycle) and the electric current in the Earth closing the electric "circuit" creating the magnetic field in 1850. This roughly matched the eleven-year sunspot cycle discovered by Heinrich Schwabe.

He calculated the orbits of the moons of Uranus and Saturn, obtaining the first value for Uranus' mass. By chance, he observed Neptune in 1845 and twice in 1846, but did not recognize the object as being a new planet.

He died, unmarried and without children, in Munich, Germany, on 6 August 1879. His considerable wealth was used to found scholarships in sciences. He is buried in Bogenhausen Churchyard on the edge of Munich.

== Publications ==
Lamont is the author of Handbuch des Erdmagnetismus (1849).

== Honours ==
His many honours include ForMemRS and FRSE. In 1867, he was awarded the Merit Order of the Bavarian Crown by the King of Bavaria, through which Lamont was ennobled and permitted to use the predicate "von". The statue on his tomb in Munich has him with an open hand, into which the locals put small coins. In 1934, the Deeside Field Club erected a granite memorial cairn in his memory at Inverey, Scotland. It was unveiled by Sir James Jeans.

The following astronomical features were named in his honour:

- Lamont (Martian crater).
- Lamont (lunar crater).
