= Gustav Trunk =

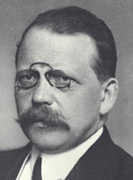
Gustav Trunk.

Gustav Trunk (24 July 1871 in Waldprechtsweier - 23 April 1936 in Karlsruhe) was a three-time President of Baden. He was a lawyer by occupation and was a member of the German Centre Party.

In 1897, Gustav Trunk married Emma Eppel in Baden-Baden. He studied law in Berlin and Heidelberg, graduating in 1900. Heavily influenced by his model, Franz Xavier Lenders, Trunk joined the Centre Party.

== Early political career and first term (1920-21) ==
He served on the city council of Karlsruhe from 1911 until 1919. Upon the creation of the Republic of Baden, he was appointed Minister for Food, a position in which he served until 1919, when he became Minister for Justice. On 14 August 1920 the Centre party defeated the Social Democratic Party of Germany in the Baden elections and Trunk became State President, succeeding the centre-leftist Anton Geiss. By 1921, however, the left wing regained much of its popularity, and Trunk's party was defeated by the left-wing liberal German Democratic Party.

Political offices
Preceded by Anton Geiss	State President of Baden; 1920–1921	Succeeded by Hermann Hummel
Preceded by Willy Hellpach	State President of Baden; 1925–1926	Succeeded by Heinrich Köhler
Preceded by Heinrich Köhler	State President of Baden; 1927	Succeeded by Adam Remmele
