= Anton Geiss =

German politician

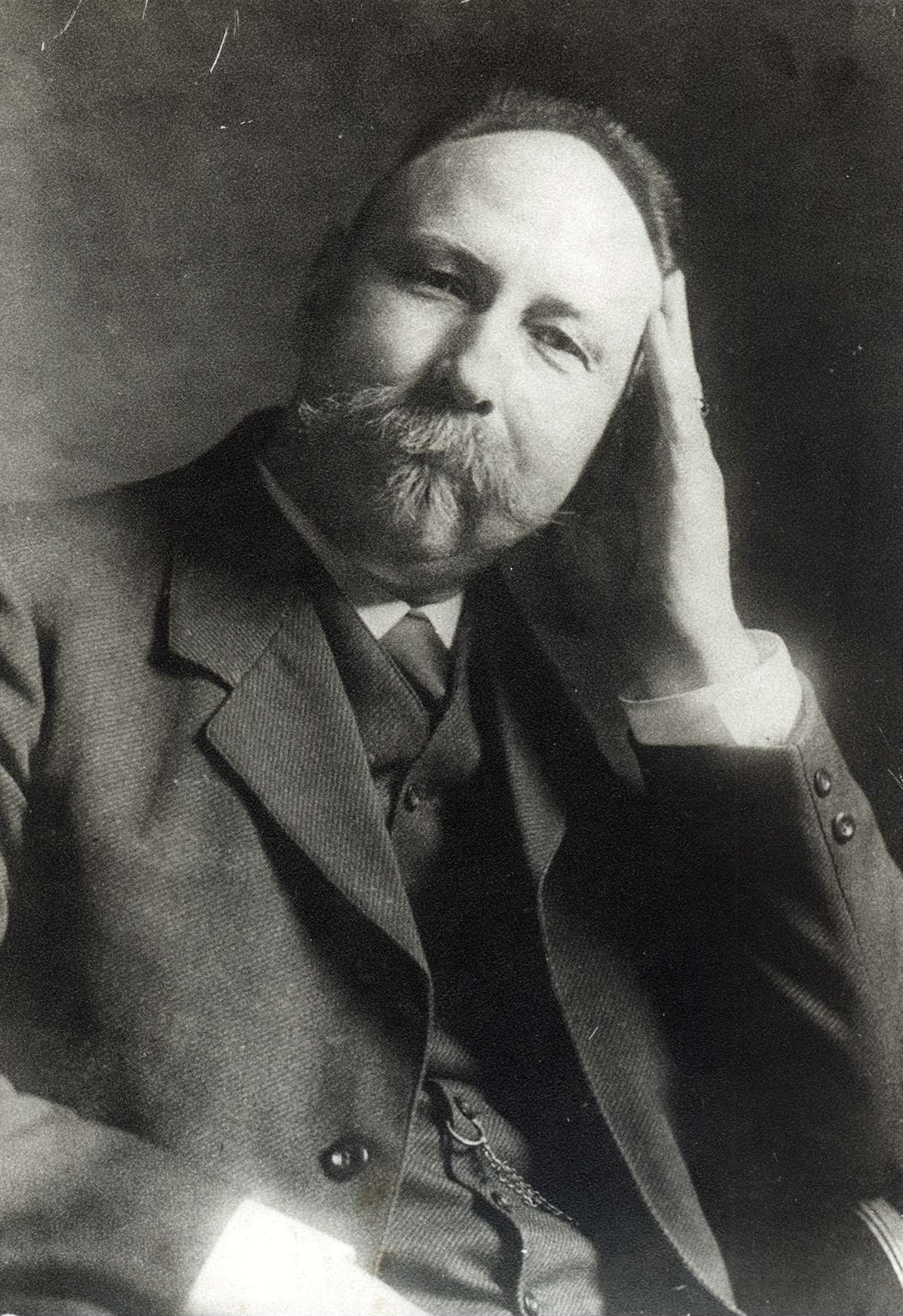
Anton Geiss

Anton Geiss, German spelling Anton Geiß (11 August 1858 in Rettenbach – 3 March 1944 in Schriesheim) was a German politician in the Grand Duchy of Baden and in the Republic of Baden. He was a member of the SPD.

He served on Baden's local legislature, the Baden Landtag, from 1895 to 1903 and from 1909 to 1921. He was the chairman of the SPD in Baden from 1908 until 1921.

Geiss also served in a number of executive offices in Baden. When the Republic of Baden was first created in November 1918 (following the abdication of Frederick II, Grand Duke of Baden), he became Chairman of the Provisional Government. On 2 April 1919 he became State President (head of government) and Minister for Military Affairs, serving in these positions until his resignation in August 1920.

Political offices
Preceded by Frederick II as Grand Duke of Baden	Chairman of the Provisional Government of Baden; 10 November 1918 – 1 April 1919	First elections in the Republic of Baden
New title	State President of Baden; 1 April 1919 – 14 August 1920	Succeeded by Gustav Trunk
