= Adam Remmele =

German politician (1877–1951)

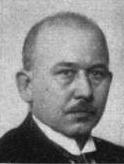
Adam Remmele.

Adam Remmele (26 December 1877 in Heidelberg – 9 September 1951 in Freiburg im Breisgau) was a German Social Democratic politician in Baden. He also sat in the Reichstag.

== Pre-Republic activities ==
Remmele was the son of a miller and early in his life, he learned this trade as well, placing him in the working class. In 1894, he joined the Social Democratic Party of Germany (SPD) and his trade union. He rose quickly through the ranks and in 1900, he became the chairman of the local union cartel in Ludwigshafen. He served on various other workers' councils and was the editor of the Socialist People's Voice in Mannheim from 1908 until 1918.

== Republic of Baden ==
Remmele held in various positions in the new Republic of Baden:

- 1919–1925: Minister of the Interior
- 1925–1926: Minister of Culture
- 1929–1931: Minister of Culture
- 1929–1931: Minister of Justice

He had two terms as State President of Baden from the SPD: from 1922 to 1923 and 1927–1928.

== Under the Nazis ==
Following the Nazi takeover in 1933, Remmele was arrested. Although most Social Democrats were quickly released, Remmele was held in a concentration camp until 1934. Following his release, he started his own business in Hamburg. However, following the failed assassination attempt on Adolf Hitler in 1944, Remmele was again arrested and was this time held until the end of the Second World War.

== Postwar activities ==
Following the war, Remmele began working towards the reconstruction of consumer co-operatives. He worked in several consumer co-operative organizations until his retirement in 1949. He also briefly re-entered politics and represented Frankfurt am Main from 1948 to 1949 in West Germany.

Following his retirement, Remmele moved to Freiburg im Breisgau, where he lived until his death in 1951.

Preceded by Gustav Trunk	State President of Baden; 1927-1928	Succeeded by Josef Schmitt
Preceded by Hermann Hummel	State President of Baden; 1922-1923	Succeeded by Heinrich Köhler
