= Julius Jolly (politician) =

German politician

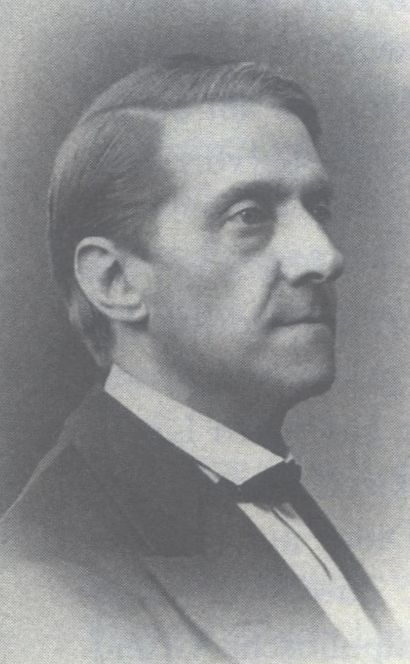
Julius Jolly

Julius August Isaak Jolly (21 February 1823, Mannheim – 14 October 1891, Karlsruhe) was a German politician. From 1868 to 1876 he was Staatsminister and head of government for the Grand Duchy of Baden. His brother was the physicist Philipp von Jolly.

== Bibliography ==
- Julius Jolly. In: Meyers Konversations-Lexikon. 4th edition. Volume 9, Verlag des Bibliographischen Instituts, Leipzig/Vienna 1885–1892, p. 255.
- Albert Teichmann (1905). "Jolly, Julius". Allgemeine Deutsche Biographie (in German). Vol. 50. Leipzig: Duncker & Humblot. pp. 690–701.
- Robert Goldschmit: Julius Jolly. In: Badische Biographien. Tl. 5, Heidelberg 1906, ISSN 0940-2640, S. 327–352 (Online).
- Lothar Gall (1974). "Jolly, Julius". Neue Deutsche Biographie (in German). Vol. 10. Berlin: Duncker & Humblot. pp. 589–591. (full text online).
