= Politics of Saarland =

Overview of the politics of the German state of Saarland

The politics of Saarland takes place within a framework of a federal parliamentary representative democratic republic, where the Federal Government of Germany exercises sovereign rights with certain powers reserved to the states of Germany including Saarland. The state has a multi-party system where the two main parties are the Social Democratic Party of Germany (SPD) on the left and the Christian Democratic Union on the right.

Every five years, all Germans residing in the State over the age of 18 elect the members of the Saarland Landtag. This regional parliament or legislature then elects the minister-president and confirms the cabinet members.

== History pre-1957 ==
=== League of Nations ===
The "Territory of the Saar Basin" was governed by the League of Nations under the Treaty of Versailles from 1920 until 1935. The Chairmen of the Commission of Government were:

- 1920 - 1926: Victor Rault (France)
- 1926 - 1927 George Washington Stevens (Canada)
- 1927 - 1932 Sir Ernest Colville Collins Wilton (UK)
- 1932 - 1935 Sir Geoffrey George Knox (UK)

=== Nazi Germany ===
Saarland voted to rejoin Germany in 1935. The German-appointed Reichskommissar were:

- 1935 - 1944: Josef Bürckel (NSDAP)
- 1944 - 1945: Willi Stöhr (NSDAP)

=== Saar protectorate ===
From 1947 to 1956, Saarland was controlled by France as a protectorate. Elections were held but pro-German parties were banned.

Minister-Presidents in this time were:

- 1945 - 1946: Hans Neureuther, Leader of the Government under French administration
- 1946 - 1947: Erwin Müller, Chairman of the Administrative Commission
- 1947 - 1955: Johannes Hoffmann, CVP
- 1955 - 1956: Heinrich Welsch (ind)
- 1956 - 1957: Dr. Hubert Ney, (CDU)

== List of minister-presidents ==
Saarland joined the Federal Republic of Germany in 1957. Since then, its minister-presidents have been:

- 1957 - 1959: Egon Reinert, CDU
- 1959 - 1979: Dr. Franz Josef Röder, CDU
- 1979 (26 June - 5 July): Werner Klumpp, FDP, interim
- 1979 - 1985: Werner Zeyer, CDU
- 1985 - 1998: Oskar Lafontaine, SPD
- 1998 - 1999: Reinhard Klimmt, SPD
- 1999 - 2011: Peter Müller, CDU
- 2011 - 2018: Annegret Kramp-Karrenbauer, CDU
- 2018 – 2022: Tobias Hans, CDU
- 2022-present: Anke Rehlinger, SPD

== Landtag of Saarland ==
=== Party strength in the Landtag ===
A darkened box under a party in any given year denotes that the party had either not yet been founded, or the party had become defunct, by the date of that election.

Prior to joining Germany

Election year	Total seats	Seats won					
Election year	Total seats	CVP	SPS	DPS	KP	CDU	DSP
1947	50	28	17	3	2		
1952	50	29	17		4		
1955	50	13	2	12	2	14	7

Since joining the Federal Republic of Germany

Election year	Total seats	Seats won						
Election year	Total seats	CDU	SPD	FDP	Grüne	Linke	AfD	Other
1960	50	19	16	7				8 (Note: 6 SVP, 2 DDU)
1965	50	23	21	4				2 (Note: SVP)
1970	50	27	23					
1975	50	25	22	3				
1980	51	23	24	4				
1985	51	20	26	5				
1990	51	18	30	3				
1994	51	21	27		3			
1999	51	26	25					
2004	51	27	18	3	3			
2009	51	19	13	5	3	11		
2012	51	19	17		2	9		4 (Note: Pirates)
2017	51	24	17			7	3	
2022	51	19	29				3	

=== Legislative compositions ===
1st Landtag, following 1947 election

2nd Landtag, following 1952 election

3rd Landtag, following 1955 election

4th Landtag, following 1960 election

5th Landtag, following 1965 election

6th Landtag, following 1970 election

7th Landtag, following 1975 election

8th Landtag, following 1980 election

9th Landtag, following 1985 election

10th Landtag, following 1990 election

11th Landtag, following 1994 election

12th Landtag, following 1999 election

13th Landtag, following 2004 election

14th Landtag, following 2009 election

15th Landtag, following 2012 election

16th Landtag, following 2017 election

17th Landtag, following 2022 election

=== State election results maps ===
1990 Saarland state election

1994 Saarland state election

1999 Saarland state election

2004 Saarland state election

2009 Saarland state election

2012 Saarland state election

2017 Saarland state election

2022 Saarland state election

=== Constituencies in the Landtag ===
- Saarbrücken (01)
- Saarlouis (02)
- Neunkirchen (03)

=== Vote share ===
The election results have been:

Year	CDU	SPD	FDP/DPS	Grüne	Die Linke	Piraten	AfD	TSP	CVP	SPS	DPS	KP	DDU	Others
1947	-	-	-	-	-	-	-		51,2 %*	32,8%	7,6%	8,4%	-	-
1952	-	-	-	-	-	-	-		54,7 %	32,4%	-	9,5%	-	3,4%
1955	25,4 %	14,3 %	-	-	-	-	-		21,8%	5,8%	24,2 %	6,8%	0,9%	1,0%
1960	36,6 %	30,0%	-	-	-	-	-		11,4%	-	13,6 %	-	5,0%	3,4%
1965	42,7 %	40,7%	8,3 %	-	-	-	-		5,2%	-	-	-	-	3,1%
1970	47,8 %	40,8%	4,4%	-	-	-	-		-	-	-	-	-	7,0%
1975	49,1 %	41,8%	7,4%	-	-	-	-		-	-	-	-	-	1,7%
1980	44,0 %	45,4%	6,9 %	2,9%	-	-	-		-	-	-	-	-	0,8%
1985	37,3%	49,2 %	10,0%	2,5%	-	-	-		-	-	-	-	-	1,0%
1990	33,4%	54,4 %	5,6%	2,6%	-	-	-		-	-	-	-	-	4,0%
1994	38,6%	49,4 %	2,1%	5,5%	-	-	-		-	-	-	-	-	4,5%
1999	45,5 %	44,4%	2,6%	3,2%	-	-	-		-	-	-	-	-	4,3%
2004	47,5 %	30,8%	5,2%	5,6%	2,3%	-	-		-	-	-	-	-	8,6%
2009	34,5 %	24,5%	9,2 %	5,9 %	21,5%	-	-		-	-	-	-	-	4,4%
2012	35,2%	30,6%	1,2%	5,0%	16,1%	7,4%	-		-	-	-	-	-	4,5%
2017	40,7%	29,6%	3,3%	4,0%	12,9%	0,7%	6,2%		-	-	-	-	-	2,6%
2022	28,5%	43,5%	5,7%	5,0%	2,6%	0,3%	5,7%	2,3%	-	-	-	-	-	6,4%

== Constituencies in the Bundestag ==
No	Constituency	Member	2021	Voters	2017	2013	2009	2005	2002	1998	1994	1990
296	Saarbrücken	Josephine Ortleb	SPD	192,929	SPD	CDU	CDU	SPD	SPD	SPD	SPD	SPD
297	Saarlouis	Heiko Maas	SPD	203,279	CDU	CDU	CDU	SPD	SPD	SPD	SPD	SPD
298	St. Wendel	Christian Petry	SPD	173,074	CDU	CDU	CDU	SPD	SPD	SPD	SPD	SPD
299	Homburg	Esra Limbacher	SPD	185,941	CDU	CDU	CDU	SPD	SPD	SPD	SPD	SPD
