= Anke Rehlinger =

German politician (born 1976)

Anke Rehlinger MdL MdBR
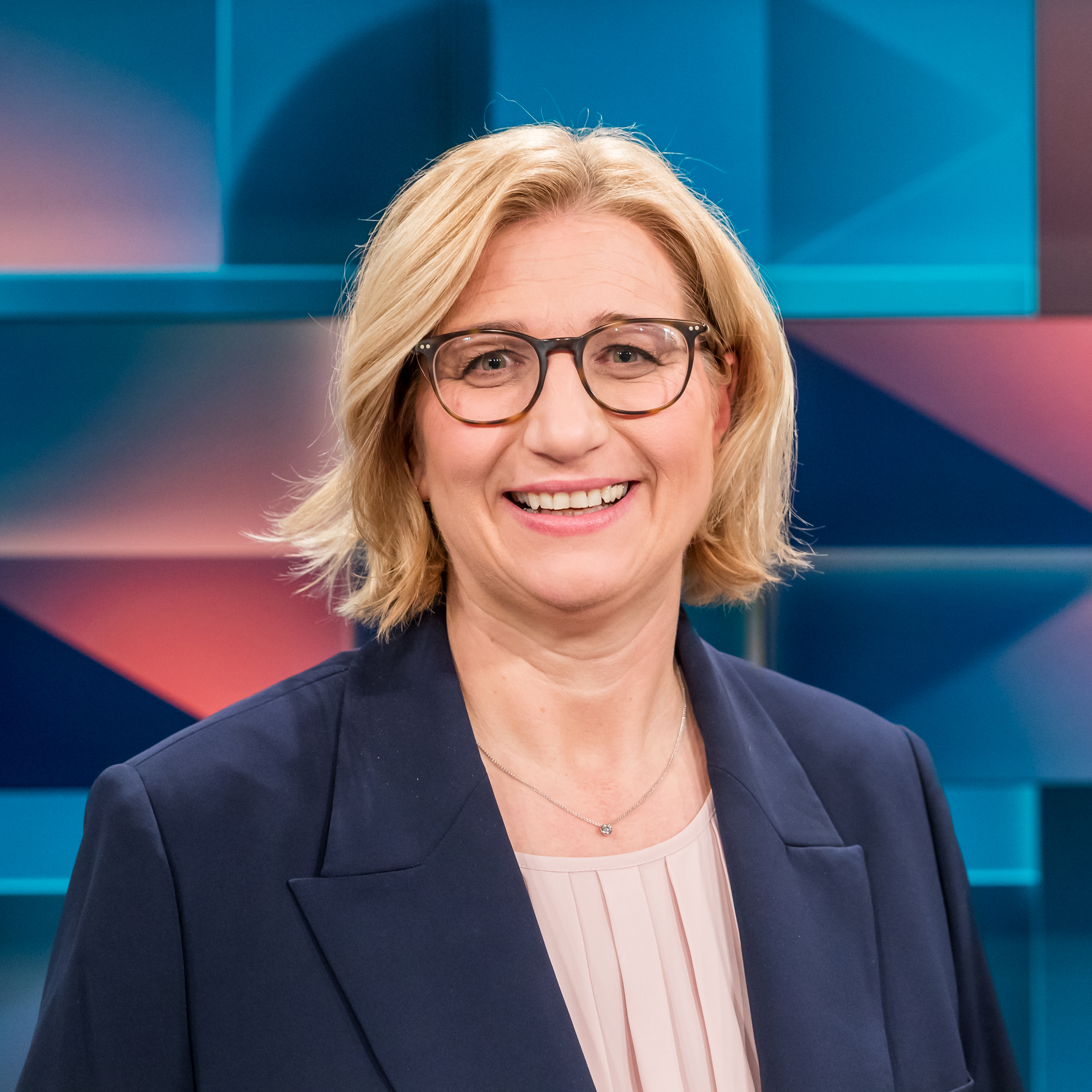
- Rehlinger in 2025

Minister-President of the Saarland
- Incumbent
- Assumed office 26 April 2022
- Deputy: Jürgen Barke
- Preceded by: Tobias Hans

Leader of the Social Democratic Party of the Saarland
- Incumbent
- Assumed office 10 March 2018
- Deputy: Pascal Arweiler; Jörg Aumann; Josephine Ortleb; Anne Yliniva-Hoffmann
- General secretary: Christian Petry
- Preceded by: Heiko Maas

Deputy Minister-President of the Saarland
- In office 18 December 2013 – 26 April 2022
- Minister-president: Annegret Kramp-Karrenbauer; Tobias Hans
- Preceded by: Heiko Maas
- Succeeded by: Jürgen Barke

President of the Bundesrat
- In office 1 November 2024 – 31 October 2025
- First Vice President: Manuela Schwesig
- Preceded by: Manuela Schwesig
- Succeeded by: Andreas Bovenschulte
Saarland Cabinet
Minister for the economy, labour, energy and transport
In office 16 January 2014 – 26 April 2022
Minister-president	Annegret Kramp-Karrenbauer; Tobias Hans
Preceded by	Heiko Maas
Succeeded by	Jürgen Barke
Minister of justice
In office 9 May 2012 – 16 January 2014
Minister-president	Annegret Kramp-Karrenbauer
Preceded by	Annegret Kramp-Karrenbauer
Succeeded by	Reinhold Jost
Minister for the environment and consumer protection
In office 9 May 2012 – 16 January 2014
Minister-president	Annegret Kramp-Karrenbauer
Preceded by	Andreas Storm
Succeeded by	Reinhold Jost
Landtag constituencies
Member of the Landtag of Saarland for Saarlouis
Incumbent
Assumed office 29 September 2004
Preceded by	multi-member district
Constituency	Social Democratic Party List

Personal details
- Born: Anke Gabriele Moos; 6 April 1976 (age 50) Wadern, Saarland, West Germany (now Germany)
- Party: Social Democratic Party (1998–)
- Spouse: Thomas Rehlinger (m. 1999; sep. 2022)
- Children: 1
- Education: Saarland University
- Website: anke-rehlinger.de

Anke Gabriele Rehlinger (née Moos; born 6 April 1976) is a German politician of the Social Democratic Party (SPD) serving as the minister-president of Saarland. After her party won the 2022 state elections in Saarland, she became the second female minister-president after Annegret Kramp-Karrenbauer and the first from her party. She was previously the deputy minister president of Saarland from 17 December 2013 until her election by the State Parliament of Saarland as minister-president in 2022. In her capacity as minister-president, she also served a one-year term as President of the Bundesrat from 2024 to 2025.

== Early life, education and sports ==
Rehlinger studied law at Saarland University. As a student, she was successful in field competitions in athletics. As of March 2024 she holds the Saarland state record in shot put (16.03 m in Rehlingen on 17 August 1996) as well as the Saarland youth state record in discus throw (49.18 m on 23 September 1995 in Rehlingen).

She successfully competed in the senior track and field German Championships in 2014 and 2015.

== Political career ==
=== Career in state politics ===
Since the 2004 state elections, Rehlinger has been a member of the Landtag of Saarland. In parliament, she was the chairwoman of the committee on European affairs (2008–2009) and of the committee on education, cultural affairs and media (2009–2011). From 2011 until 2012, she was her parliamentary group's deputy chairwoman, under the leadership of chairman Heiko Maas.

Between 2012 and 2014, Rehlinger was state minister of justice, consumer protection and environmental affairs in the government of the minister-president of Saarland Annegret Kramp-Karrenbauer. In 2014, she succeeded Heiko Maas as deputy minister-president and state minister for economic affairs, first under the leadership of Kramp-Karrenbauer (2014–2018) and later Tobias Hans (2018–2022). She was the candidate of SPD in 2017 state elections, but lost against Kramp-Karrenbauer and continued her role in the state government instead.

As one of her state's representatives at the Bundesrat, Rehlinger sat on the committee on labour, integration and social policy, the committee on economic affairs and on the committee on transport.

In March 2018, Rehlinger succeeded Heiko Maas as leader of the SPD in Saarland. At a party convention, she was elected with a majority of 94.5 percent.

=== Career in national politics ===
Rehlinger co-chaired the SPD's national conventions in Berlin (2015, 2017, 2019) and Wiesbaden (2018).

In the negotiations to form a coalition government on the national level following the 2017 federal elections, Rehlinger co-chaired the working group on agriculture. Her counterparts were Julia Klöckner and Christian Schmidt. She was also a member of the working group on transport.

At a SPD national convention in 2019, Rehlinger, with Klara Geywitz, Hubertus Heil, Kevin Kühnert and Serpil Midyatli, was elected as one of the five deputies of the party's co-chairs Saskia Esken and Norbert Walter-Borjans.

In the negotiations to form a so-called "traffic light coalition" of the SPD, the Green Party and the Free Democratic Party (FDP) following the 2021 federal elections, Rehlinger led her party's delegation in the working group on mobility. Her co-chairs from the other parties were Anton Hofreiter and Oliver Luksic.

Since 2023, Rehlinger has been coordinating her party's relations with Asia. In this capacity, she joined chairman Lars Klingbeil on an official trip to China, South Korea and Mongolia that year.

Rehlinger was nominated by her party as delegate to the Federal Convention for the purpose of electing the president of Germany in 2022.

In October 2023, Rehlinger joined the first joint cabinet retreat of the German and French governments in Hamburg, chaired by Chancellor Olaf Scholz and President Emmanuel Macron.

On 18 October 2024, she was elected President of the Bundesrat. Her one-year term started on 1 November 2024 and ended 1 November 2025; she was succeeded by Andreas Bovenschulte.

== Other activities ==
=== Regulatory bodies ===
- Federal Network Agency for Electricity, Gas, Telecommunications, Post and Railway (BNetzA), member of the advisory board (since 2014)

=== Corporate boards ===
- Landesbank Saar (SaarLB), ex-officio member of the supervisory board
- VSE AG, ex-officio member of the advisory board

=== Non-profit organization ===
- Business Forum of the Social Democratic Party of Germany, member of the Political Advisory Board (since 2018)
- Franco-German Institute (DFI), member of the board
- Völklingen Ironworks, ex-officio chairwoman of the supervisory board
- IG Bergbau, Chemie, Energie (IG BCE), member
- German Red Cross, member

== Personal life ==
From 1999 to 2022, Rehlinger was married to Thomas Rehlinger, a medical doctor. In 2008, she gave birth to a son. Rehlinger is Roman Catholic.

Political offices
Preceded by Tobias Hans	Minister-President of the Saarland; 2022–present	Incumbent
Preceded by Manuela Schwesig	President of the Bundesrat; 2024–2025	Succeeded by Andreas Bovenschulte
