= 1999 Saarland state election =

State election in Saarland, Germany

- 5 September 1999

All 51 seats of the Landtag of Saarland 26 seats needed for a majority
- Turnout: 557,337 (68.7%) ▼14.8%
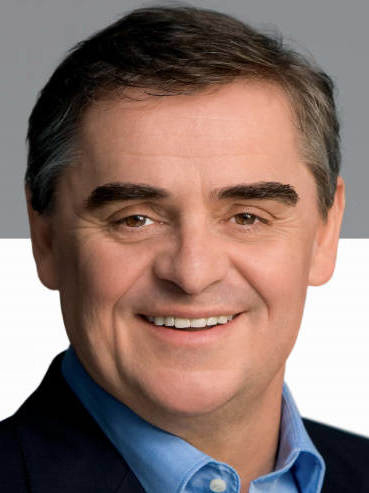

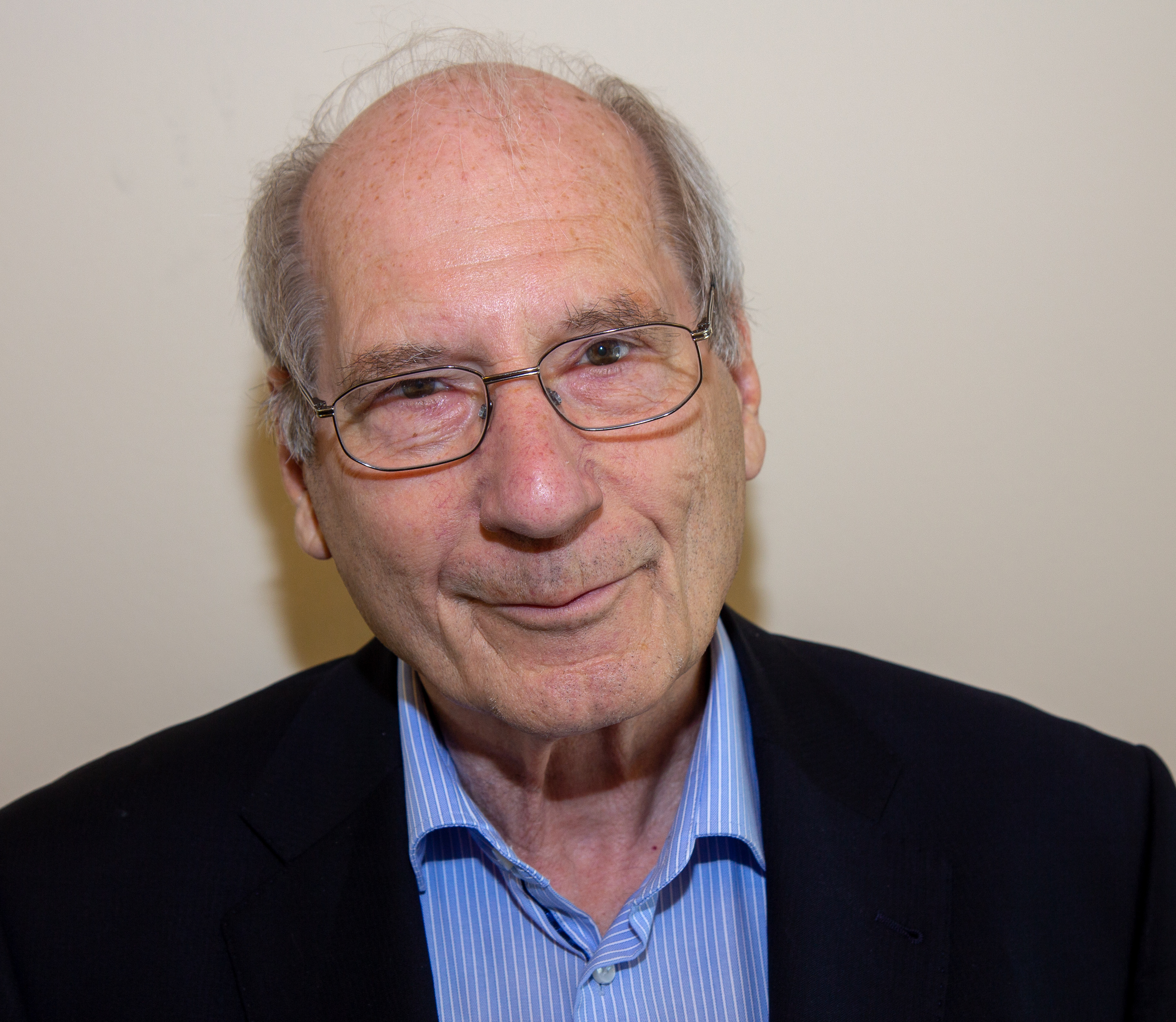
	First party	Second party	Third party
Leader	Peter Müller	Reinhard Klimmt	Christian Molitor
Party	CDU	SPD	Greens
Last election	21 seats, 38.6%	27 seats, 49.4%	3 seats, 5.5%
Seats won	26	25	0
Seat change	▲5	▼2	▼3
Popular vote	253,856	247,311	18,106
Percentage	45.5%	44.4%	3.2%
Swing	▲6.9%	▼5.0%	▼2.3%
Minister-President before election
Reinhard Klimmt
SPD
Elected Minister-President
Peter Müller
CDU

The 1999 Saarland state election was held on 5 September 1999 to elect the members of the Landtag of Saarland. The incumbent Social Democratic Party (SPD) government led by Minister-President Reinhard Klimmt was defeated. The Christian Democratic Union (CDU) won a narrow majority of one seat. CDU leader Peter Müller was subsequently elected minister-president.

== Parties ==
The table below lists parties represented in the previous Landtag of Saarland.

Name		Ideology	Leader(s)	1994 result	
Name		Ideology	Leader(s)	Votes (%)	Seats
SPD	Social Democratic Party of Germany; Sozialdemokratische Partei Deutschlands	Social democracy	Reinhard Klimmt	49.4%	27 / 51
CDU	Christian Democratic Union of Germany; Christlich Demokratische Union Deutschlands	Christian democracy	Peter Müller	38.6%	21 / 51
Grüne	Alliance 90/The Greens; Bündnis 90/Die Grünen	Green politics	Christian Molitor	5.5%	3 / 51

== Opinion polling ==
Polling firm	Fieldwork date	Sample size	SPD	CDU	Grüne	FDP	Others	Lead
1999 state election	5 Sep 1999	–	44.4	45.5	3.2	2.6	4.2	1.1
Forschungsgruppe Wahlen	31 Aug 1999	1,017	46	45	4	4	1	1
Infratest dimap	18 Aug 1999	1,000	43	45	5	3	4	2
Infratest dimap	14–18 Jul 1999	1,000	43	46	4.5	2	4.5	3
Infratest dimap	17–21 Jun 1999	1,000	42	46	4	3	5	4
Emnid	25–29 Mar 1999	1,000	45	42	6	3	4	3
Forsa	March 1999	?	51	41	4	2	2	10
Forsa	19 Feb 1999	?	51	36	?	?	?	15
Emnid	30 Jan 1999	?	46	41	7	2	?	5
1994 state election	16 Oct 1994	–	49.4	38.6	5.5	2.1	4.4	10.8

== Election result ==
Summary of the 5 September 1999 election results for the Landtag of Saarland
Party	Votes	%	+/-	Seats	+/-	Seats %
Christian Democratic Union (CDU)	253,856	45.5	▲6.9	26	▲5	51.0
Social Democratic Party (SPD)	247,311	44.4	▼5.0	25	▼2	49.0
Alliance 90/The Greens (Grüne)	18,106	3.2	▼2.3	0	▼3	0
Free Democratic Party (FDP)	14,259	2.6	▲0.5	0	±0	0
Others	23,805	4.2		0	±0	0
Total	557,337	100.0		51	±0	
Voter turnout		68.7	▼14.8			

== Sources ==
- The Federal Returning Officer
