= Transatlantic Climate Bridge =

Climate partnership between Germany, Canada and the United States

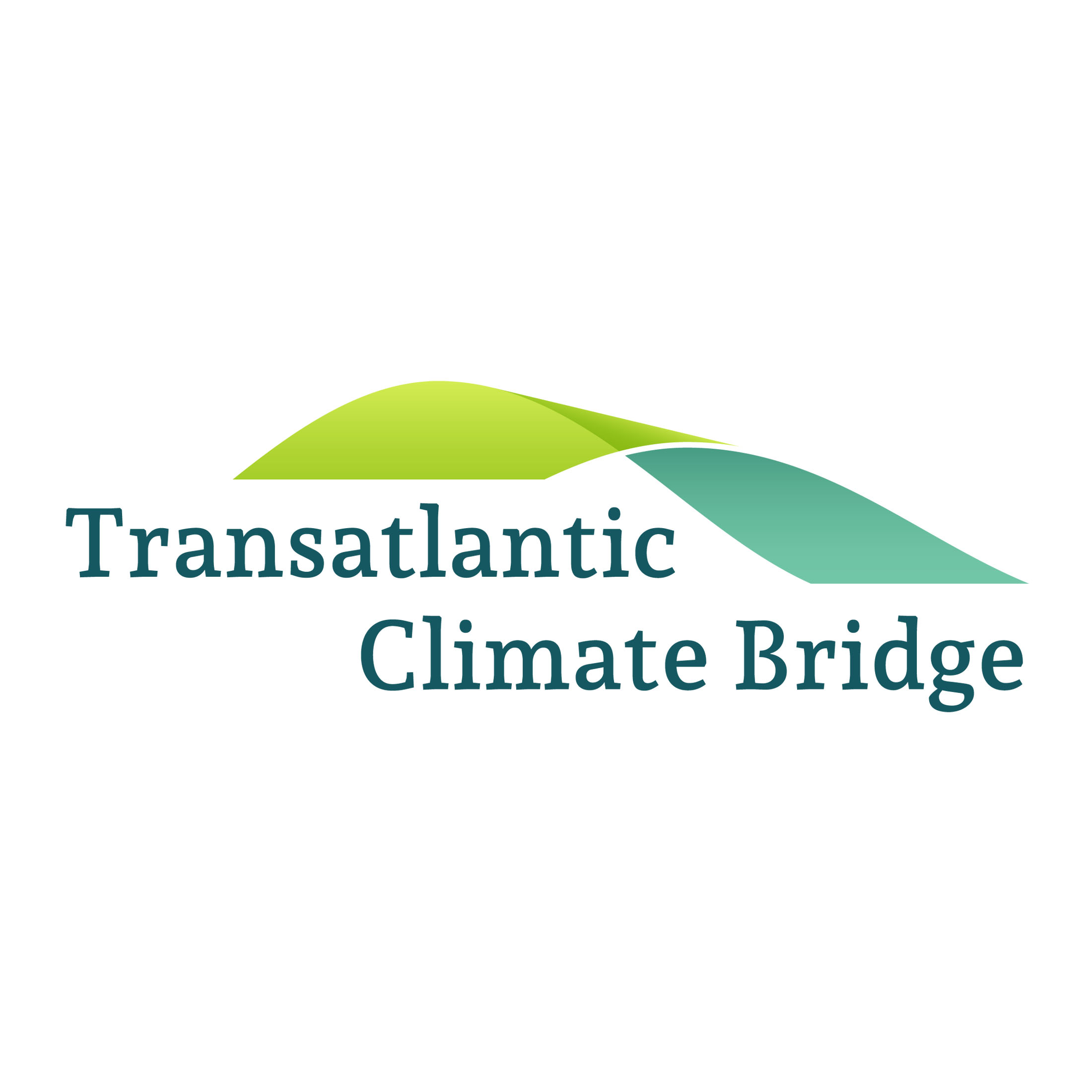

The Transatlantic Climate Bridge is a climate partnership between Germany, Canada, and the United States.

The partnership was first proposed by German Foreign Minister Frank-Walter Steinmeier in an April 2008 lecture at Harvard University. As a network of various activities supported by Germany's Federal Foreign Office, Federal Ministry for the Environment and the foreign missions in North America, the TCB aims to stimulate and expand transatlantic exchange on climate and energy policy.

In the fall of 2020, German Foreign Minister Heiko Maas announced a relaunch of the Transatlantic Climate Bridge in the aftermath of the U.S. election of President Joseph R. Biden. President Biden, who took office on January 20, 2021, recommitted the U.S. politically to international climate policy after its four-year absence from the global climate governance arena. Although the TCB relaunch provides a framework for establishing long-term, inter-administration climate policy relations between the U.S. and German governments, it structurally seeks to include Canada as well. Additionally, with the 2020 relaunch, the TCB extended its focus beyond the government level to involve states, cities, parliamentarians, businesses, and academia.
