= Peter Müller (politician) =

German politician

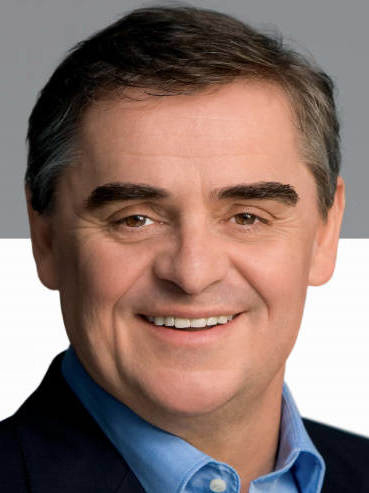
- Müller in 2009

Judge of the Federal Constitutional Court of Germany for the Second Senate
- In office 19 December 2011 – 21 December 2023
- Nominated by: CDU/CSU
- Appointed by: Bundesrat
- Preceded by: Udo Di Fabio
- Succeeded by: Peter Frank

Minister-President of the Saarland
- In office 29 September 1999 – 9 August 2011
- Deputy: Peter Jacoby; Christoph Hartmann
- Preceded by: Reinhard Klimmt
- Succeeded by: Annegret Kramp-Karrenbauer

President of the Bundesrat
- In office 1 November 2008 – 31 October 2009
- First Vice President: Ole von Beust
- Preceded by: Ole von Beust
- Succeeded by: Jens Böhrnsen

Minister of Justice of the Saarland
- In office 10 November 2009 – 24 August 2011
- Minister-President: himself
- Preceded by: Gerhard Vigener
- Succeeded by: Annegret Kramp-Karrenbauer

Leader of the Opposition in the Landtag of Saarland
- In office 12 April 1994 – 29 September 1999
- Minister-President: Oskar Lafontaine; Reinhard Klimmt
- Preceded by: Peter Jacoby
- Succeeded by: Heiko Maas

Leader of the Christian Democratic Union in the Landtag of Saarland
- In office 12 April 1994 – 29 September 1999
- Preceded by: Peter Jacoby
- Succeeded by: Peter Hans
Parliamentary constituencies
Member of the Bundestag for Saarland
In office 18 October 2005 – 28 November 2005
Preceded by	multi-member district
Succeeded by	Hermann-Josef Scharf
Constituency	Christian Democratic Union list
Member of the Landtag of Saarland
In office 21 Februar 1990 – August 2011
Preceded by	multi-member district
Succeeded by	Egbert Ulrich
Constituency	Christian Democratic Union of Germany List

Personal details
- Born: Peter Aloysius Müller; 25 September 1955 (age 71) Illingen, Saar Protectorate (now Saarland, Germany)
- Party: Christian Democratic Union (1971–)
- Education: University of Bonn; University of Saarbrücken
- Occupation: Politician; Judge; Lecturer

Peter Aloysius Müller (born 25 September 1955 in Illingen, Saar Protectorate) is a German politician of the Christian Democratic Union (CDU) who served as a judge at the German Federal Constitutional Court from 2011 to 2023.

From 1999 to 2011, Müller held the position of Premier (Ministerpräsident) of the state of Saarland, serving as President of the Bundesrat in 2008/09.

== Education and early career ==
After sitting the Abitur (German final exams) in 1974 at the Realgymnasium in Lebach, Müller studied jurisprudence and politics in the Bonn and Saarbrücken. He sat for the two required State Examinations in Law, the first in 1983, and the second in 1986. From then until 1994, he served as a judge at the district court of Saarbrücken, as well as a research fellow for Saarland University.

== Political career ==
Müller is a member of the CDU. In 1995, he was elected chairman of the CDU in Saarland. He was also part of the CDU's informal internal grouping, the "Jungen Wilden" (Young Turks), as well as of the "Andenpakt" (Andes Pact).

=== Saarland Legislative Assembly, 1990–2011 ===
From 1990, Müller was a Member of the Landtag of the Saarland. From 1994 through 1999, he was the chairman of the CDU parliamentary group in the assembly, making him the leader of the opposition against the governments of Ministers-President Oskar Lafontaine (1990–1998) and Reinhard Klimmt (1998–1999). In this capacity, he publicly spoke out against Angela Merkel and instead endorsed Edmund Stoiber as the party's candidate to challenge incumbent Chancellor Gerhard Schröder in the 2002 federal elections.

On 17 August 2005 the then Chancellor-candidate Angela Merkel chose Müller to be a member of her shadow cabinet as a prospective minister of economics and trade. In the federal election of 2005, he obtained a federal party ticket in Saarland. He was part of the CDU/CSU team in the negotiations with the SPD on a coalition agreement, which paved the way to the formation of Chancellor Angela Merkel’s first government. However, on 26 November 2005 he decided not to take up his post as a Member of Parliament (Bundestag). He was succeeded by Hermann Scharf.

=== Minister-President of Saarland, 1998–2011 ===
After the CDU received 45.5% of the votes, a narrow majority government, he became Minister-President of Saarland. On 3 September 2004 the CDU was able to expand upon its advantage in the parliament elections. In 2009, he formed a so-called Jamaica coalition with the liberal FDP and the Greens before leaving office in 2011 to accept an appointment to the Federal Constitutional Court.

Between 2003 and 2007, Müller also served as Commissioner of the Federal Republic of Germany for Cultural Affairs under the Treaty on Franco-German Cooperation. During his time in office, the first joint French-German history textbook, by French and German authors, was unveiled in May 2006.

== Judge of the Federal Constitutional Court, 2011–2023 ==
Ahead of the 2014 European elections, Müller issued a dissenting opinion on the Second Senate's judgement that a three-percent electoral threshold in the law governing European elections is unconstitutional. He argued that “the impairment of the European Parliament's ability to function is sufficiently important to justify an interference with the principles of electoral equality and equal opportunities of political parties.“

In 2018, the Second Senate of the Federal Constitutional Court decided that it must render its decision on a constitutional complaint directed against the prohibition of assisted suicide services (§ 217 StGB) without participation of Müller on the grounds of possible bias. During his time as Minister-President, his government (unsuccessfully) submitted a draft law prohibiting assisted suicide services in 2006.

== Other activities ==
- European Foundation for the Speyer Cathedral, Member of the Board of Trustees
- donum vitae, Member of the Board of Trustees
- Gesellschaft für Rechtspolitik (GfR), Member of the Presidium
- Gewerkschaft der Polizei, Member
- ZDF, Member of the Board of Directors (2007–2011)
- RAG-Stiftung, Ex-Officio Member of the Board of Trustees (2007–2011)

== Awards and Distinctions ==
In 2003 Peter Müller was given the Premier of the Year (Ministerpräsident des Jahres) Award in Berlin for the years 2000 to 2002 for his article "Initiative Neue Soziale Marktwirtschaft" (New Social Free Market Initiative), which was published in the economic magazine WirtschaftsWoche.

== Personal life ==
Müller and his wife Astrid have three children.
