= 1994 Saarland state election =

State election in Saarland, Germany

- 16 October 1994

All 51 seats of the Landtag of Saarland 26 seats needed for a majority
- Turnout: 688,880 (83.5%) ▲0.3%
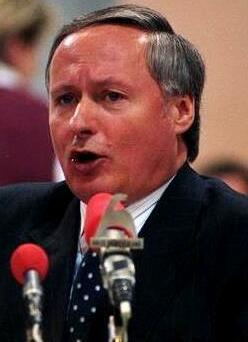

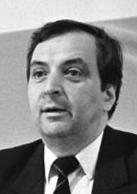
	First party	Second party
Leader	Oskar Lafontaine	Klaus Töpfer
Party	SPD	CDU
Last election	30 seats, 54.4%	18 seats, 33.4%
Seats won	27	21
Seat change	▼3	▲3
Popular vote	340,091	265,871
Percentage	49.4%	38.6%
Swing	▼5.0%	▲5.2%
	Third party	Fourth party
Party	Greens	FDP
Last election	0 seats, 2.6%	3 seats, 5.6%
Seats won	3	0
Seat change	▲3	▼3
Popular vote	38,087	14,206
Percentage	5.5%	2.1%
Swing	▲2.9%	▼3.5%
Minister-President before election
Oskar Lafontaine
SPD
Elected Minister-President
Oskar Lafontaine
SPD

The 1994 Saarland state election was held on 16 October 1994 to elect the members of the Landtag of Saarland. The incumbent Social Democratic Party (SPD) government led by Minister-President Oskar Lafontaine was returned with a reduced majority and continued in office.

== Parties ==
The table below lists parties represented in the previous Landtag of Saarland.

Name		Ideology	Leader(s)	1990 result	
Name		Ideology	Leader(s)	Votes (%)	Seats
SPD	Social Democratic Party of Germany; Sozialdemokratische Partei Deutschlands	Social democracy	Oskar Lafontaine	54.4%	30 / 51
CDU	Christian Democratic Union of Germany; Christlich Demokratische Union Deutschlands	Christian democracy	Klaus Töpfer	33.4%	18 / 51
FDP	Free Democratic Party; Freie Demokratische Partei	Classical liberalism		5.6%	3 / 51

== Election result ==
Summary of the 16 October 1994 election results for the Landtag of Saarland
Party	Votes	%	+/-	Seats	+/-	Seats %
Social Democratic Party (SPD)	340,091	49.4	▼5.0	27	▼3	52.9
Christian Democratic Union (CDU)	265,871	38.6	▲5.3	21	▲3	41.2
Alliance 90/The Greens (Grüne)	38,087	5.5	▲2.9	3	▲3	5.9
Free Democratic Party (FDP)	14,206	2.1	▼3.5	0	▼3	0
The Republicans (REP)	9,708	1.4	▼2.0	0	±0	0
Others	20,917	3.0		0	±0	0
Total	688,880	100.0		51	±0	
Voter turnout		83.5	▲0.3			

== Sources ==
- Landtagswahlen im Saarland seit 1945
