= 1990 Saarland state election =

State election in Saarland, Germany

- 28 January 1990

All 51 seats of the Landtag of Saarland 26 seats needed for a majority
- Turnout: 694,101 (83.2%) ▼1.8%
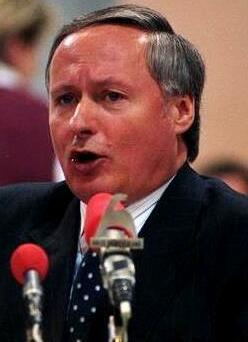

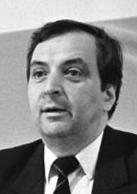
	First party	Second party	Third party
Leader	Oskar Lafontaine	Klaus Töpfer
Party	SPD	CDU	FDP
Last election	26 seats, 49.2%	20 seats, 37.3%	5 seats, 10.0%
Seats won	30	18	3
Seat change	▲4	▼2	▼2
Popular vote	377,501	231,983	39,113
Percentage	54.4%	33.4%	5.6%
Swing	▲5.2%	▼3.9%	▼4.4%
Minister-President before election
Oskar Lafontaine
SPD
Elected Minister-President
Oskar Lafontaine
SPD

The 1990 Saarland state election was held on 28 January 1990 to elect the members of the Landtag of Saarland. The incumbent Social Democratic Party (SPD) government led by Minister-President Oskar Lafontaine was returned with an increased majority and continued in office.

== Parties ==
The table below lists parties represented in the previous Landtag of Saarland.

Name		Ideology	Leader(s)	1985 result	
Name		Ideology	Leader(s)	Votes (%)	Seats
SPD	Social Democratic Party of Germany; Sozialdemokratische Partei Deutschlands	Social democracy	Oskar Lafontaine	49.2%	26 / 51
CDU	Christian Democratic Union of Germany; Christlich Demokratische Union Deutschlands	Christian democracy	Klaus Töpfer	37.3%	20 / 51
FDP	Free Democratic Party; Freie Demokratische Partei	Classical liberalism		10.0%	5 / 51

== Election result ==
Summary of the 28 January 1990 election results for the Landtag of Saarland
Party	Votes	%	+/-	Seats	+/-	Seats %
Social Democratic Party (SPD)	377,502	54.4	▲5.2	30	▲4	58.8
Christian Democratic Union (CDU)	231,983	33.4	▼3.9	18	▼2	35.3
Free Democratic Party (FDP)	39,113	5.6	▼4.4	3	▼2	5.9
The Republicans (REP)	23,263	3.4	▲3.4	0	±0	0
Alliance 90/The Greens (Grüne)	18,380	2.6	▲0.1	0	±0	0
Others	3,860	0.6		0	±0	0
Total	694,101	100.0		51	±0	
Voter turnout		83.2	▼1.8			

== Sources ==
- Landtagswahlen im Saarland seit 1945
