= Ami, it's time to go =

2022 book by Oskar Lafontaine

- Author: Oskar Lafontaine
- Language: German
- Subject: Germany–United States relations
- Publisher: Westend Verlag
- Publication date: 21 November 2022
- Publication place: Germany
- Pages: 64
- ISBN: 9783864894060
- Website: https://www.westendverlag.de/buch/spiel-mit-dem-feuer/

Ami, it's time to go! Plädoyer für die Selbstbehauptung Europas (transl. Ami, it's time to go! A plea for Europe's self-assertion) is a 2022 book by the German politician Oskar Lafontaine. The book is critical of NATO and the United States. The title is adapted from the 1970s slogan "Ami — go home!" Ami is German slang for Americans.

== Summary ==
Over 64 pages, Oskar Lafontaine, who briefly served as Minister of Finance in the First Schröder cabinet and later co-founded The Left, gives his analysis of the relationship between Germany and the United States. He is highly critical of the American military presence in Germany and the policies on NATO, which he says is impossible to regard as a defense organisation and only can be described as a tool for American geopolitical interests. Lafontaine says Germany's military aid to Ukraine during the 2022 Russian invasion of Ukraine shows how Germany is not an independent country, but a vassal state to the United States. He argues that Europe must break its submission to American interests and pave its way.

== Reception ==
The book was published by Westend Verlag in Frankfurt on 21 November 2022. It had a first print run of 10,000 copies and entered the German bestseller chart for non-fiction on position ten.

== See also ==
- Anti-American sentiment in Germany
- List of United States Army installations in Germany
