= 2004 Saarland state election =

State election in Saarland, Germany

- 5 September 2004

All 51 seats of the Landtag of Saarland 26 seats needed for a majority
- Turnout: 441,628 (55.5%) ▼13.2%
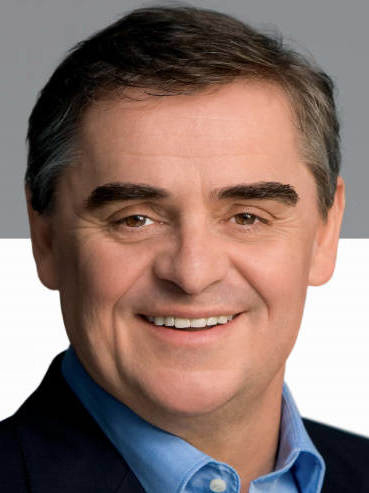

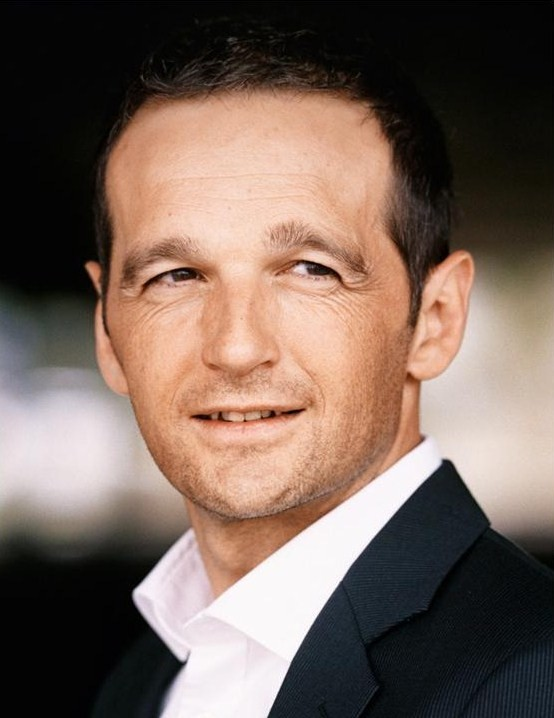
	First party	Second party
Leader	Peter Müller	Heiko Maas
Party	CDU	SPD
Last election	26 seats, 45.5%	25 seats, 44.4%
Seats won	27	18
Seat change	▲1	▼7
Popular vote	209,690	136,224
Percentage	47.5%	30.8%
Swing	▲2.0%	▼13.6%
	Third party	Fourth party
Party	Greens	FDP
Last election	0 seats, 3.2%	0 seats, 2.6%
Seats won	3	3
Seat change	▲3	▲3
Popular vote	24,830	22,842
Percentage	5.6%	5.2%
Swing	▲2.4%	▲2.6%
Minister-President before election
Peter Müller
CDU
Elected Minister-President
Peter Müller
CDU

The 2004 Saarland state election was held on 5 September 2004 to elect the members of the Landtag of Saarland. The incumbent Christian Democratic Union (CDU) government led by Minister-President Peter Müller retained its majority and continued in office.

== Parties ==
The table below lists parties represented in the previous Landtag of Saarland.

Name		Ideology	Leader(s)	1999 result	
Name		Ideology	Leader(s)	Votes (%)	Seats
CDU	Christian Democratic Union of Germany; Christlich Demokratische Union Deutschlands	Christian democracy	Peter Müller	45.5%	26 / 51
SPD	Social Democratic Party of Germany; Sozialdemokratische Partei Deutschlands	Social democracy	Heiko Maas	44.4%	25 / 51

== Opinion polling ==
Polling firm	Fieldwork date	Sample size	CDU	SPD	Grüne	FDP	Others	Lead
2004 state election	5 Sep 2004	–	47.5	30.8	5.6	5.2	10.9	16.7
Infratest dimap	23–25 Aug 2004	1,000	51	30	7	5	7	21
Forschungsgruppe Wahlen	17–19 Aug 2004	1,001	50	31	6	3	10	19
Forsa	10–13 Aug 2004	1,001	54	29	6	4	7	25
SaarZoom	1–14 Jun 2004	600	54.2	31.6	4.4	4.3	5.6	22.6
Infratest dimap	21–28 May 2004	1,000	54	33	5	3	5	21
SaarZoom	5–15 Feb 2004	600	56.7	29.9	4.9	3.0	5.6	26.8
SaarZoom	13–23 Oct 2003	500	56	33	5	1	5	23
Infratest dimap	24–28 Sep 2003	1,000	54	33	6	3	4	21
dimap	29 Nov 2002	1,000	54	33	4	3	6	21
Infratest dimap	5–8 Sep 2002	1,000	48	39	4	5	4	9
Infratest dimap	14–19 Jun 2002	1,000	49	38	4	6	3	11
Infratest dimap	24–30 Aug 2001	1,000	49	40	4	3	4	9
Infratest dimap	25–30 Aug 2000	1,000	48	43	3	3	?	5
Emnid	14–23 Aug 2000	?	46	43	4	4	?	3
1999 state election	5 Sep 1999	–	45.5	44.4	3.2	2.6	4.2	1.1

== Election result ==
Summary of the 5 September 2004 election results for the Landtag of Saarland
Party	Votes	%	+/-	Seats	+/-	Seats %
Christian Democratic Union (CDU)	209,690	47.5	▲2.0	27	▲1	52.9
Social Democratic Party (SPD)	136,224	30.8	▼13.6	18	▼7	35.3
Alliance 90/The Greens (Grüne)	24,830	5.6	▲2.4	3	▲3	5.9
Free Democratic Party (FDP)	22,842	5.2	▲2.6	3	▲3	6.9
National Democratic Party (NPD)	17,590	4.0	▲4.0	0	±0	0
Family Party of Germany (FAMILIE)	13,106	3.0	▲2.0	0	±0	0
Party of Democratic Socialism (PDS)	10,240	2.3	▲1.5	0	±0	0
Others	7,106	1.6		0	±0	0
Total	441,628	100.0		51	±0	
Voter turnout		55.5	▼13.2			

Popular Vote
CDU	47.48%
SPD	30.85%
B'90/GRÜNE	5.62%
FDP	5.17%
NPD	3.98%
FAMILIE	2.97%
PDS	2.32%
Other	1.61%

Landtag seats
CDU	52.94%
SPD	35.29%
B'90/GRÜNE	5.88%
FDP	5.88%

== Sources ==
- The Federal Returning Officer
