= Bund der Deutschen =

Political party in the Federal Republic of Germany

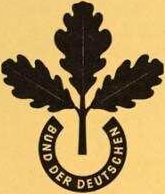
- Leader: Josef Weber (1964–1968)
- Founded: 1953
- Dissolved: 1968
- Split from: Christian Democratic Union of Germany
- Merged into: German Peace Union
- Newspaper: Deutsche Volkszeitung
- Ideology: Anti-Western integration Anti-militarism; Neutrality

The Alliance of Germans, Party for Unity, Peace and Freedom (German: Bund der Deutschen, Partei für Einheit, Frieden und Freiheit, BdD) was a political party in the Federal Republic of Germany.

== Origins of the BdD and its program until the foundation of the German Peace Union ==
The BdD resulted from the opposition movement to Konrad Adenauer's policies of Western integration. After signing of the general agreement on 26 June 1952, the German Union (Deutsche Sammlung) was founded in Dortmund. Members of the presidium were the former German chancellor Joseph Wirth (CDU), Katharina von Kardorff-Oheimb and Wilhelm Elfes (also former CDU member). The Deutsche Sammlung called for opposition to Western integration and demanded that every opportunity for German re-unification should be used.

The foundation of the BdD followed the initiative of the politburo of the Socialist Unity Party of East Germany. Despite the fact that 'bourgeois' politicians like Joseph Wirth, Wilhelm Elfes made up the leadership, the party organisation and finances were in firm control of communist functionaries. The goal of the SED was to form a so-called National Front of bourgeois and "national" forces ("national-gesinnte"), similar to the communist-controlled National Front in East Germany.

The core program of the BdD was a policy of neutrality as well as opposition to the re-armament of West Germany and the Western integration. Unlike Konrad Adenauer's policies, an understanding/a compromise with the USSR was sought.

Though the BdD tried to advance economic and social demands of the middle classes and the peasants, it also sought socialisation of the large industrial enterprises. In 1956, the Communist Party of Germany was forbidden just like re-foundation of possible communist successor parties. Therefore, in the late 1950s, the BdD started to act increasingly as a substitute (Ersatzorganisation) for West German communists.

== The BdD as a component of the DFU ==
With the foundation of the German Peace Union (Deutsche Friedensunion) the SED preferred to fuse the BdD with the newly founded GDR-sponsored organisation DFU. The constitutional court of North Rhine-Westphalia thus classified the BdD in 1964 as a cadre organisation of the DFU. In effect the BdD –despite continued existence of its own organisation – no longer took part in elections but rather delegated its candidates to the DFU list. On 2 November 1968, the German Communist Party, DFU, BdD and other leftist groupings formed a common list, the Democratic Progress Action (Aktion Demokratischer Fortschritt) for the Bundestag election of 1969. The number of BdD members had fallen (according to SED records) from 12,000 (1953/1955) to less than 3,000 (1965).

The BdD was never officially disbanded but it fused de facto after its last party conference in 1968 with the DFU. The last chairman of the party was Josef Weber (chairman since 1964; previously general secretary of the BdD and later a DFU and ADF functionary).

== Media ==
In 1953, the Deutsche Volkszeitung was founded as a BdD-close body. The weekly Freitag, still published today, was the indirect successor to that newspaper.

== Elections ==
The BdD took part in the following Bundestag resp. Landtag elections:

- 1953 election to Bundestag in a joint ticket with the GVP – 318,475 votes (1.2%)
- 1954 election to Landtag of North Rhine-Westphalia – 19,515 votes (0.3%)
- 1954 election to Landtag of Schleswig-Holstein – 10,009 votes (0.8%)
- 1954 election to Landtag of Hesse – 12,047 votes (0.5%)
- 1954 election to Landtag of Bavaria – 43,720 votes (0.4%)
- 1955 election to Landtag of Saxony-Anhalt – 8,600 votes (0.3%)
- 1955 election to Landtag of Rhineland-Palatinate – 10,527 votes (0.7%)
- 1955 election to Bürgerschaft of Bremen – 3,988 votes (1.1%)
- 1956 election to Landtag of Baden-Württemberg – 18,077 votes (0.6%)
- 1957 the BdD had its own list on Bundestag election and won 58,725 votes (0.2%)
- 1957 election to Hamburg Parliament – 3,469 votes (0.3%)
- 1958 election to Landtag of North Rhine-Westphalia – 176 votes (0.0% (−0.3%))
- 1958 election to Landtag of Schleswig-Holstein – 6,037 votes (0.5% (−0.3%))
- 1959 election to Landtag of Lower Saxony – 4,947 votes (0.1% (−0.2%))
- 1959 election to Landtag of Rhineland-Palatinate – 6,613 votes (0.4% (−0.3%))
- 1959 election to Bürgerschaft of Bremen – 1,337 votes (0.3% (-0.8%))
- 1960 election to Landtag of Saarland (as German Democratic Union) – 26,743 votes (5.0%)
- 1961 election to Landtag of Baden-Württemberg – 15,333 votes (0.5% (−0.1%))

== See also ==
- All-German People's Party
- Christian Democratic Union
- Action Group of Independent Germans
