= Kurt Bodewig =

German politician of the SPD

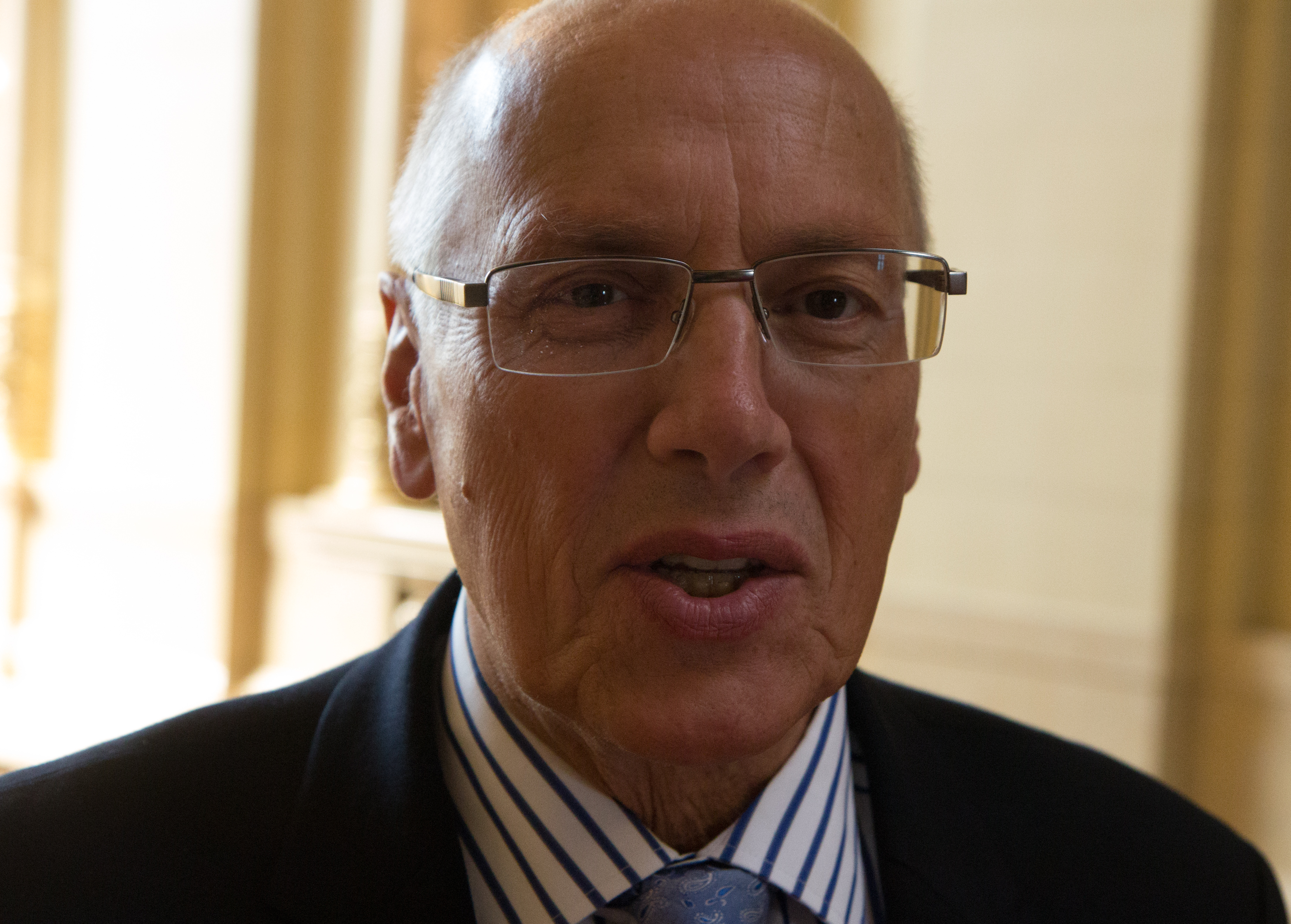

Federal Minister for Transport, Building and Urban Development
- In office 2000–2002
- Chancellor: Gerhard Schröder
- Preceded by: Reinhard Klimmt
- Succeeded by: Manfred Stolpe

Member of the Bundestag
- In office 1998–2009

Personal details
- Born: 26 April 1955 (age 70) Rheinberg, West Germany
- Party: SPD

Kurt Bodewig (born 26 April 1955) is a German politician of the Social Democratic Party (SPD) who served as a member of the German Bundestag from 1998 to 2009, representing the Neuss I district. From 2000 to 2002, he served as Minister for Transport, Building and Urban Development in the government of Chancellor Gerhard Schröder.

== Political career ==
From 1998 until 2000, Bodewig served as Parliamentary State Secretary under minister Reinhard Klimmt in the government of Chancellor Gerhard Schröder. In 2000, he succeeded Klimmt as minister. Following the 2002 elections, he was replaced by Manfred Stolpe.

From 2002 until 2009, Bodewig served on the Committee on European Affairs.

== Other activities ==
=== Corporate boards ===
- Cologne Bonn Airport, Chairman of the Supervisory Board (2016-2018)
- Duisburger Hafen AG, Chairman of the Supervisory Board
- Abellio Deutschland, Member of the Advisory Board
- I-NEA Solutions, Member of the Advisory Board
- KPMG Deutschland, Senior Adviser

=== Non-profit organizations ===
- Global Panel Foundation, Member of the Supervisory Board
- Trans-European Transport Networks (TEN-T), Coordinator (since 2014)
- Deutsche Verkehrswacht, President (since 2007)
- Baltic Sea Forum, Chairman of the Board of Trustees (since 2003)

== Recognition ==
- 2013 – Honorary Degree, Hefei University
