= National Party of Germany =

National Party of Germany Nationale Partei Deutschlands
- Abbreviation: NPD
- Leader: Erwin Mebus (1950-52); Wolf Ewert (1952-56); Moritz von Faber (1956-62)
- Founder: Erwin Mebus
- Founded: July 1, 1950; 76 years ago
- Dissolved: 1962; 64 years ago
- Merged into: German Peace Union (majority)
- Headquarters: Kassel
- Newspaper: Der Freiheitsbote
- Ideology: Anti-Western integration Pacifism; Neutrality; German nationalism
- Political position: Big tent

The National Party of Germany (German: Nationale Partei Deutschlands), short-form: NPD, was a minor neutralist and National Bolshevik political party in West Germany. It was founded on 1 July 1950 in northern Hesse and was primarily active around the cities of Kassel and Marburg. The party was alleged to be the West German offshoot of the East German National Democratic Party of Germany (NDPD), which the NPD's founder and first leader, Erwin Mebus, would confirm after his resignation in 1952.

After the departure of Mebus, the party sought alliances with all kinds of neutralist and far-right movements, including Otto Strasser's Alliance for the Rejuvenation of Germany (German: Bund für Deutschlands Erneuerung, BDE) and German-Social Union. The former of which had cooperated with the NPD to publish some of Strasser's letters under the NPD's name, while the latter had made an unsuccessful attempt at merging with the NPD.

The party never partook in any federal or state elections but supported the All-German People's Party during the 1953 West German federal election for which Wolf Ewert, at the time leader of the NPD, ran in the constituency of Marburg.

Many members of the NPD left by 1960 to join the German Peace Union. The party officially dissolved in 1962.

== Literature ==
- Stöss, Richard. Parteien-Handbuch Band 1: AUD bis EFP - Die Parteien der Bundesrepublik Deutschland 1949-1980. Westdeutscher Verlag. ISBN 3-531-11570-7
