= Dagmar Heib =

German politician (born 1963)

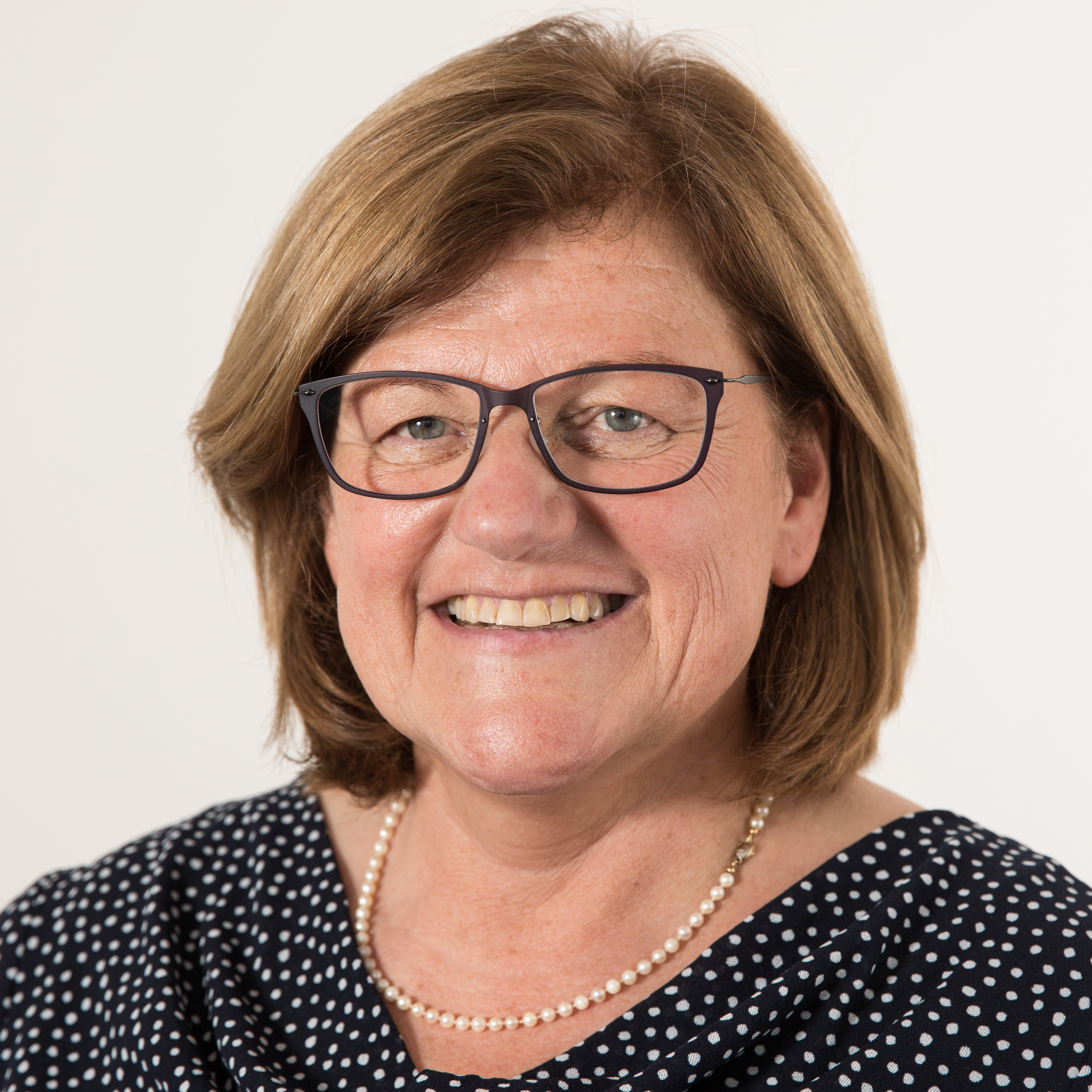
- Heib in 2017

Member of the Landtag of Saarland
- Incumbent
- Assumed office 29 September 2004

Personal details
- Born: 29 January 1963 (age 63)
- Party: Christian Democratic Union (since 1979)

Dagmar Heib (born 29 January 1963) is a German politician serving as a member of the Landtag of Saarland since 2004. She has served as vice president of the Landtag since 2022.
