= Pascal Arweiler =

German politician (born 1992)

Member of the Landtag of Saarland
- Incumbent
- Assumed office 25 April 2022

Personal details
- Born: 14 July 1992 (age 33)
- Party: Social Democratic Party

Pascal Arweiler (born 14 July 1992) is a German politician serving as a member of the Landtag of Saarland since 2022. From 2016 to 2018, he served as chairman of Jusos in Saarland.
