= German Peace Union =

German Peace Union Deutsche Friedens-Union
- Founded: 17 December 1960; 65 years ago
- Dissolved: 1989
- Merger of: BdD, Dt. Klub, KPD, SDS (factions), DFG, DDU, NPD
- Ideology: Anti-Western integration Pacifism; Neutrality; Factions; Communism; Socialism; Conservatism; German nationalism
- Political position: Majority: Left-wing to far-left Factions: Big tent
- National affiliation: Campaign for Democratic Progress (1969)
- Colours: Purple (customary)

German Peace Union (German: Deutsche Friedens-Union, or DFU) was the name of a pacifist party in the Federal Republic of Germany. It was heavily controlled by former members of the Communist Party of Germany and was funded by East Germany until its dissolution. From the late 1960s, the DFU was controlled by the new German Communist Party (DKP) and it stopped participating in elections.

Attempts at a coalition with the Action Group of Independent Germans for the 1965 and 1969 elections were unsuccessful.

== See also ==
- Pacifist Socialist Party
