= German Democratic Union =

Former German political party

The German Democratic Union (German: Deutsche Demokratische Union, DDU) was a left-wing political party. The party was only active in Saarland. The DDU was founded in 1955.

The party, with the Saar Communist Party (Kommunistische Partei Saar, KPS), objected to the Saar statute. Following Saarland's accession to the Federal Republic of Germany, the party was constituted as the Saarland regional association of the Bund der Deutschen (BdD) on July 7, 1957, but did not formally dissolve.

After Saarland's accession to the Federal Republic, KPS was banned for being a "substitute organization" of the Communist Party of Germany, which had been banned in 1956, thus many KPS members joined the DDU.

The DDU won two seats in the 1960 Saarland state election. Erich Walch and Erwin Gieseking became members of the state parliament.

On March 5, 1961, a Saar regional branch of the German Peace Union (Deutsche Friedens-Union, DFU) was constituted under the leadership of Gieseking, who was also chairman of the DDU and a founding member of the DFU. The DDU thus functioned “de facto”, according to Rolf Schönfeldt, as a regional association of the DFU, but again did not formally dissolve.

DDU members stood as candidates on the DFU list in the 1961 and 1965 federal elections, whilst DDU ran in the 1965 Saarland state election. However, they failed the re-entry in the state parliament. In 1968, they ran in the Saarland local elections and won a total of 47 seats, before merging with the DFU.
