= Egon Reinert =

Minister-President of Saarland from 1957 to 1959

Minister-President of Saarland
- In office 4 June 1957 – 23 April 1959
- Preceded by: Hubert Ney
- Succeeded by: Franz-Josef Röder

Personal details
- Born: Hans Egon Reinert; 24 September 1908 Saarbrücken, Prussia, German Empire
- Died: 23 April 1959 (aged 50) Saarbrücken, Saarland, West Germany
- Party: Nazi Party (1933-1945) Christian Democratic Union (1952-1959)
- Education: Heidelberg University; University of Bonn; Goethe University Frankfurt

Hans Egon Reinert (24 September 1908 - 23 April 1959) was a German politician (CDU) who served as Minister-President of Saarland from 1957 until his death due to a car accident in 1959.

Reinert joined the Nazi Party on 1 June 1933.
