= Westend Verlag =

German publishing house

The Westend Verlag publishing house was founded in January 2004 in Frankfurt, by Mark J. Karsten and Michael Morganti, first as a" one-book-publishing ": The title "50 einfache Dinge, die Sie tun können, um die Welt zu retten" appeared in September of that year and quickly became a huge success. The theme of the program are non-fiction books on topics such as politics, economy, society and ecology.

Among the authors Jean-Christophe Ammann, Justus Frantz, Rainer Hunold, Albrecht Müller and Peter Zudeick
