= List of minister-presidents of the Saarland =

Minister-President of the Saarland
- Ministerpräsident des Saarlandes
- Coat of arms of the Saarland

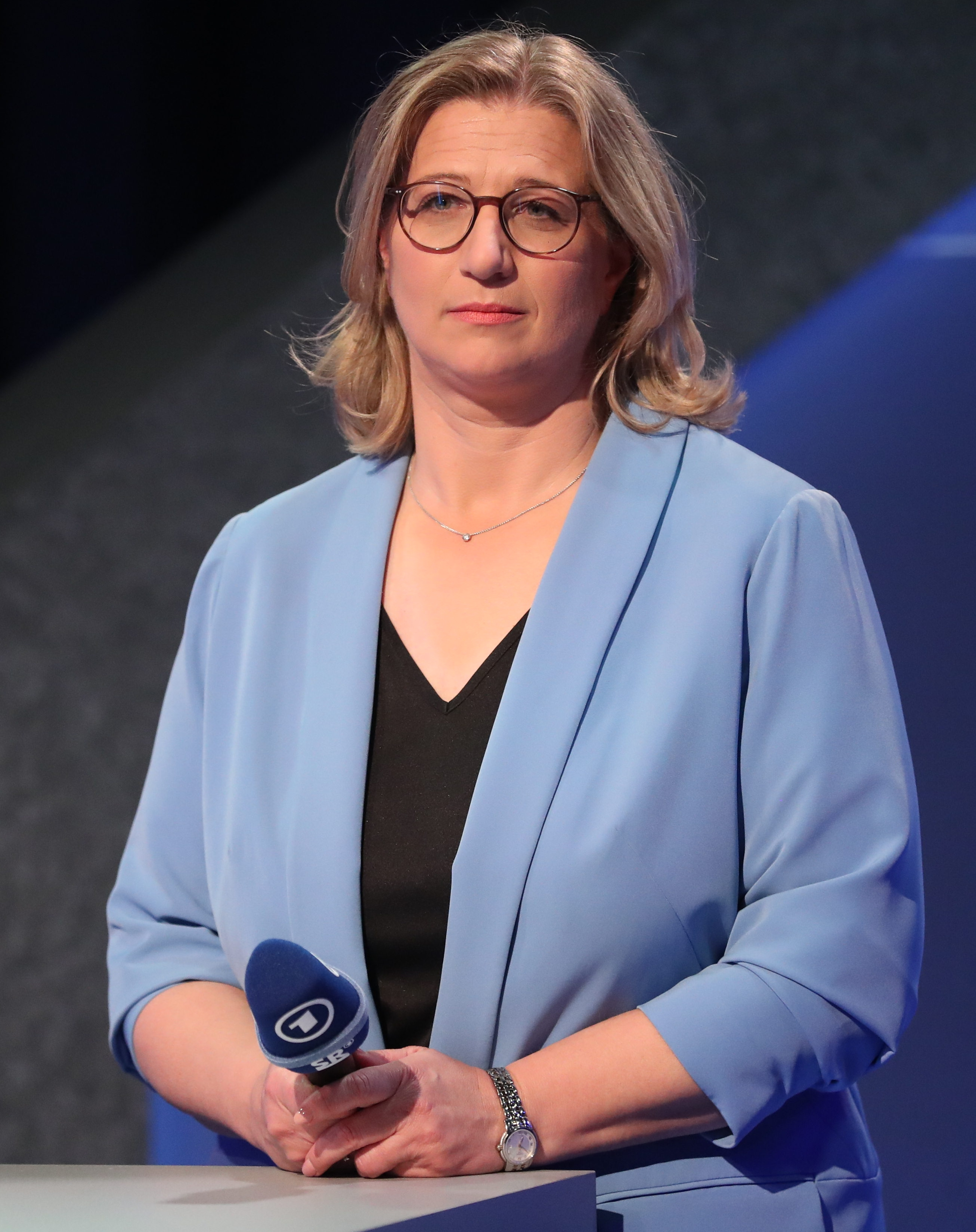
- Incumbent; Anke Rehlinger since 25 April 2022
- Residence: Saarbrücken
- Appointer: Landtag of Saarland
- Term length: Pending resignation or the election of a successor
- Inaugural holder: Johannes Hoffmann
- Formation: 15 December 1947
- Salary: regulated by legislation
- Website: www.saarland.de/EN/politics/the-state-government/the-state-government_node.html

The minister-president of the Saarland (German: Ministerpräsident des Saarlandes), is the head of government of the German state of the Saarland. The position was created in 1946. The current minister president is Anke Rehlinger, heading a Social Democratic Party government. Rehlinger succeeded Tobias Hans following the 2022 Saarland state election.

After World War II, the Saarland became a French protectorate. With the negative result of the 1955 Saar Statute referendum, the Saarland joined the Federal Republic of Germany as a state on 1 January 1957. Saarland used its own currency, the Saar franc, and postage stamps issued specially for the territory until 1959.

The office of the minister-president is known as the state chancellery (German: Staatskanzlei), and is located in the capital of Saarbrücken, along with the rest of the cabinet departments.

== List ==
Political party: CVP / CDU SPD Independent

Portrait	Name (born and died)	Term of office			Political party	Cabinet
Portrait	Name (born and died)	Took office	Left office	Days	Political party	Cabinet
1	Johannes Hoffmann (1890–1967)	20 December 1947	29 October 1955 resigned	7 years, 313 days	CVP	I II III IV
2	Heinrich Welsch (1888–1976)	29 October 1955	10 January 1956	73 days	Independent	I
3	Hubert Ney (Note: On 1 January 1957, Saarland joined the Federal Republic of Germany as its 10th state. Therefore, Ney was both the last minister-president of the partly sovereign Saar Protectorate and the first of Saarland as a German state.) (1892–1984)	10 January 1956	4 June 1957 resigned	1 year, 145 days	CDU	I
4	Egon Reinert (1908–1959)	4 June 1957	23 April 1959 died in office	1 year, 323 days	CDU	I II
5	Franz-Josef Röder (1909–1979)	23 April 1959	26 June 1979 died in office	20 years, 64 days	CDU	I II III IV V VI
Deputy Minister-President Werner Klumpp (FDP) served as acting Minister-President from 26 June to 5 July 1979.
6	Werner Zeyer (1929–2000)	5 July 1979	9 April 1985	5 years, 278 days	CDU	I II III
7	Oskar Lafontaine (born 1943)	9 April 1985	27 October 1998 resigned	13 years, 201 days	SPD	I II III
Deputy Minister-President Christiane Krajewski (SPD) served as acting minister-president from 27 October to 10 November 1998.
8	Reinhard Klimmt (born 1942)	10 November 1998	29 September 1999	323 days	SPD	I
9	Peter Müller (born 1955)	29 September 1999	9 August 2011 resigned	11 years, 314 days	CDU	I II III
Deputy Minister-President Christoph Hartmann (FDP) served as acting minister-president from 9 to 10 August 2011.
10	Annegret Kramp-Karrenbauer (born 1962)	10 August 2011	1 March 2018 resigned	6 years, 202 days	CDU	I II III
Deputy Minister-President Anke Rehlinger (SPD) served as acting minister-president from 28 February to 1 March 2018.
11	Tobias Hans (born 1978)	1 March 2018	25 April 2022	4 years, 55 days	CDU	I
12	Anke Rehlinger (born 1976)	25 April 2022	Incumbent	4 years, 149 days	SPD	I

== See also ==
- Saarland
- Politics of Saarland
- Landtag of Saarland
