= Werner Klumpp =

German politician (1928–2021)

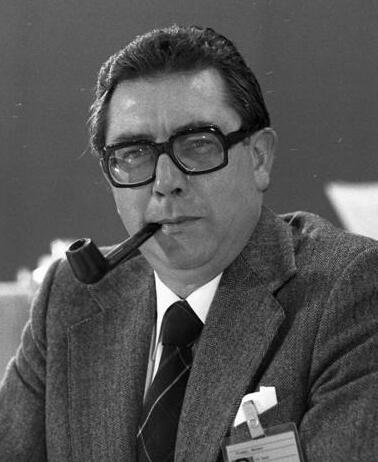
Werner Klumpp, 1977

Werner Klumpp (12 November 1928 – 8 January 2021) was a German politician of the Free Democratic Party (FDP). He was born in Baiersbronn, Württemberg. After the death of Franz-Josef Röder, Klumpp was the interim Minister President of the Saarland (26 June 1979 to 5 July 1979).
