= Reinhard Klimmt =

German politician (born 1942)

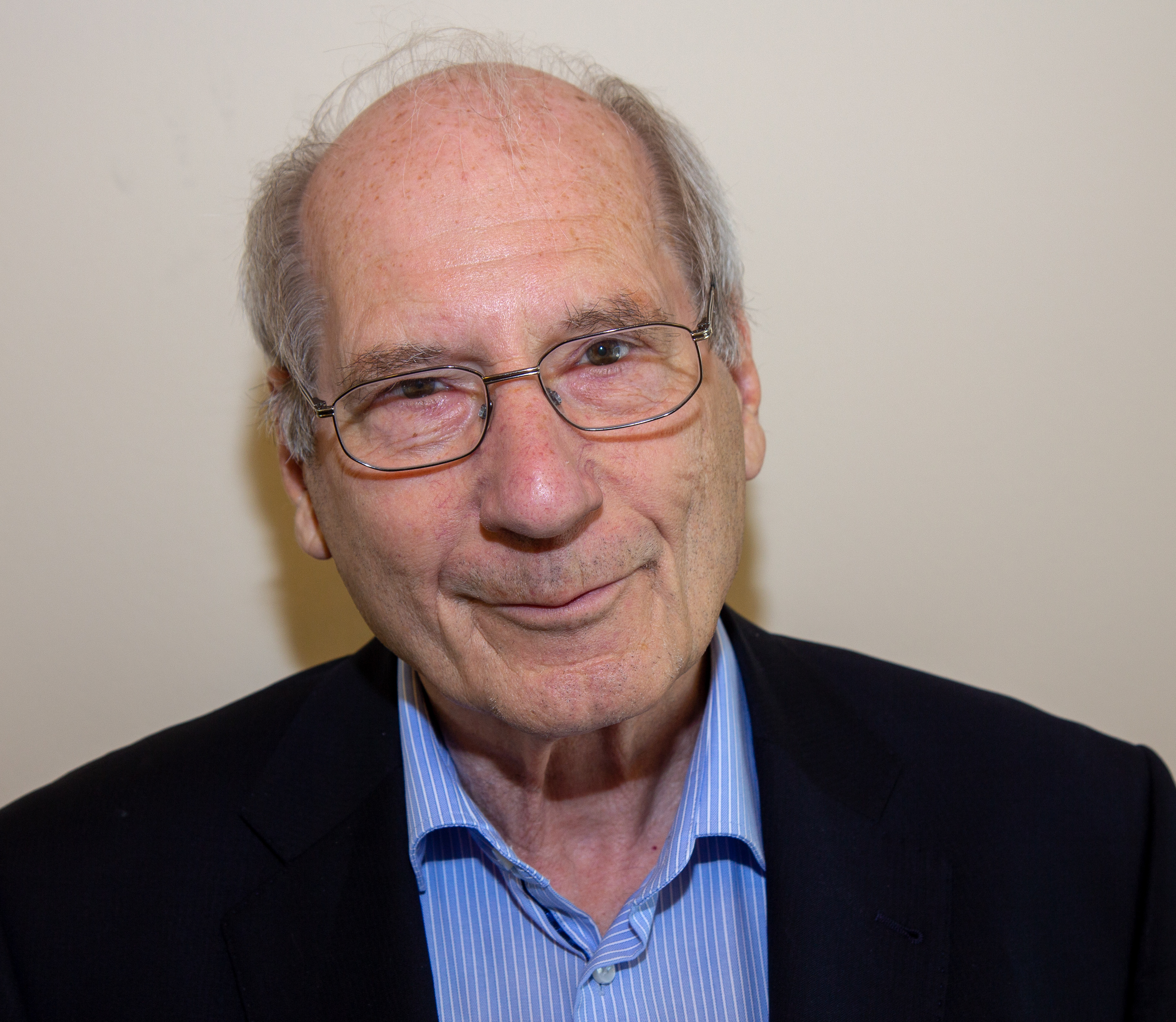

Minister President of Saarland
- In office 10 November 1998 – 29 September 1999
- President: Roman Herzog
- Chancellor: Gerhard Schröder
- Preceded by: Oskar Lafontaine
- Succeeded by: Peter Müller

Minister of Transport, Building and Urban Affairs
- In office 29 September 1999 – 16 November 2000
- Preceded by: Franz Müntefering
- Succeeded by: Kurt Bodewig

Personal details
- Born: 16 August 1942 (age 83) Berlin, Nazi Germany
- Party: Social Democratic Party (SPD)
- Occupation: Historian

Reinhard Klimmt (born 16 August 1942 in Berlin) is a German politician of the Social Democratic Party (SPD). From 1998 to 1999, he was Minister President of Saarland, and 1999–2000, Federal Minister of Transport, Building and Urban Affairs.

== Personal life ==
After passing the Abitur in Osnabrück, Klimmt studied history at the Saarland University.

He writes columns for the German website of AbeBooks.

Klimmt is married and has three children.

== Political career ==
Since 1964, Klimmt is a member of the SPD. Between 1970 and 1975 he served as head of the young socialist (Juso) in the German Land Saarland. From 1976 until 1996 he was the chairman of SPD Saarbrücken (Municipality of Saarbrücken). In 1990 he served as campaign manager of Oskar Lafontaine in the Federal elections.

From 1979 to 2002 he was a member of the media commission of the SPD on the federal level, and from 1986 he served a vice-president of this commission. He also served as a member of the policy-statement commission of the Federal SPD, which developed the Hamburg program of 2007. In 1998, he became Premier (Ministerpräsident) of the Saarland, since his predecessor, Oskar Lafontaine became the new Federal Minister of Finance after the SPD's victory in the Federal election.

In 1999, Klimmt lost to Peter Müller in the Legislative Assembly (Landtag) elections in the Saarland.

Later that year, he became Federal Minister of Transport, Building and Urban Affairs in Berlin. After only one year in office, he resigned because of his role in a financial turmoil involving the football club 1. FC Saarbrücken. As head of the board of the club which he helped to save from bankruptcy, he had signed a sponsoring contract, which had been negotiated before he came into office, and which later turned out to be double-minded. He disclosed the entire process, accepted a fine and resigned from his political office. Since then he dedicated a substantial part of his time to the publication of over a dozen books and the curatorship of numerous exhibitions on different topics.

== Reinhard Klimmt Collection ==
For several decades, Klimmt has been collecting traditional African art and, since 2002, has increasingly appeared publicly as a collector. The collection titled "Reinhard Klimmt: Africa" has been exhibited at various locations throughout Germany and, most recently, under the patronage of Gerhard Schröder in St. Petersburg, Russia. Critics allege that the collection includes copies and forgeries, a claim Klimmt refutes, citing expert reports. The planned exhibitions of the pieces in Prague and Luxembourg did not take place. In 2012, some of the items were displayed in Baden-Baden alongside works from other lenders. It was explicitly stated that the authenticity of the objects was not the main focus of the exhibition.

== Memberships ==
Member of P.E.N., Center of German language authors abroad

Member of Saarländischen Künstlerhaus (House of Sarre artists).

Chair of board of trustees of Studienstiftung Saar

Chair of the Sarre division of German Library Association (Deutscher Bibliotheksverband)

Chair of the Stiftungsrats der Stiftung Demokratie Saarland (Council of the Democracy Foundation Sarre)

Member of ZDF national TV council (National German public TV channel 2)
