= Oskar Lafontaine =

German politician (born 1943)

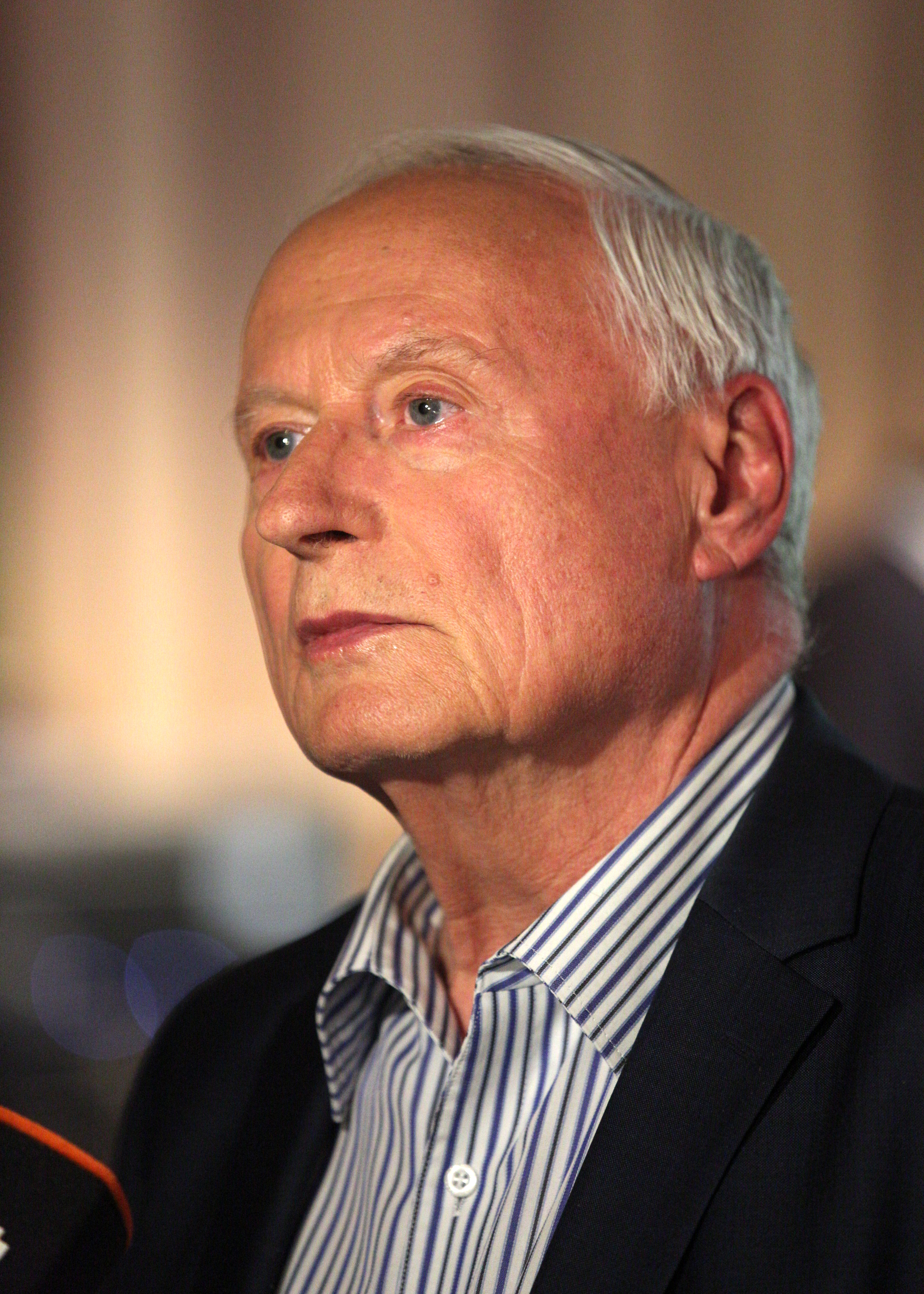
- Lafontaine in 2017

Leader of the Social Democratic Party
- In office 16 November 1995 – 12 March 1999
- General Secretary: Franz Müntefering; Ottmar Schreiner
- Preceded by: Rudolf Scharping
- Succeeded by: Gerhard Schröder

Leader of The Left
- In office 16 June 2007 – 15 May 2010 Serving with Lothar Bisky
- Preceded by: Position established
- Succeeded by: Klaus Ernst

Minister of Finance
- In office 27 October 1998 – 18 March 1999
- Chancellor: Gerhard Schröder
- Preceded by: Theodor Waigel
- Succeeded by: Hans Eichel

Minister-President of the Saarland
- In office 9 April 1985 – 9 November 1998
- Preceded by: Werner Zeyer
- Succeeded by: Reinhard Klimmt

President of the Bundesrat
- In office 1 November 1992 – 31 October 1993
- First Vice President: Berndt Seite
- Preceded by: Berndt Seite
- Succeeded by: Klaus Wedemeier

Lord Mayor of Saarbrücken
- In office 22 January 1976 – 9 April 1985
- Preceded by: Fritz Schuster
- Succeeded by: Hans-Jürgen Koebnick
Parliamentary constituencies
Member of the Landtag of Saarland for Saarlouis
In office 23 September 2009 – 25 April 2022
Preceded by	multi-member district
Succeeded by	multi-member district
Member of the Bundestag for Saarland (North Rhine-Westphalia; 2005–2009)
In office 18 October 2005 – 1 February 2010
Preceded by	multi-member district
Succeeded by	Yvonne Ploetz
Member of the Bundestag for Saarbrücken I
In office 26 October 1998 – 16 March 1999
Preceded by	himself (1994)
Succeeded by	Gudrun Roos
In office 15 November 1994 – 17 November 1994
Preceded by	himself (1990) (Note: He had already been elected to the Bundestag for Saarbrücken I in the 1990 German federal election, but did not accept his mandate after the election. Michael Habermann was his successor on the party list.)
Succeeded by	Elke Ferner
Member of the Landtag of Saarland for Saarbrücken
In office 9 April 1985 – 9 November 1998
Preceded by	multi-member district
Succeeded by	Karin Lawall
In office 13 July 1970 – 14 July 1975
Preceded by	multi-member district
Succeeded by	multi-member district

Personal details
- Born: 16 September 1943 (age 83) Saarlouis, Saarland, Germany
- Party: BSW (2023–present)
- Other political affiliations: SPD (1966–2005); WASG (2005–2007); The Left (2007–2022); Independent (2022–2023)
- Spouses: Ingrid Bachert (m. 1967; div. 1982); Margret Müller (m. 1982; div. 1988); Christa Müller (m. 1993; div. 2013); Sahra Wagenknecht (m. 2014)
- Children: 2
- Education: Saarland University (Diplom)
- Occupation: Politician; Publicist; Physicist
- Website: Official website

Oskar Lafontaine (German pronunciation: [ˈɔskaʁ lafõˈtɛːn, -fɔnˈ-]; born 16 September 1943) is a German politician. He served as Minister-President of the state of Saarland from 1985 to 1998 and was federal leader of the Social Democratic Party (SPD) from 1995 to 1999. He was the lead candidate for the SPD in the 1990 German federal election, but lost by a wide margin. He served as Minister of Finance under Chancellor Gerhard Schröder after the SPD's victory in the 1998 federal election, but resigned from both the ministry and Bundestag less than six months later, positioning himself as a popular opponent of Schröder's policies in the tabloid press.

In the lead-up to the 2005 federal election, as a reaction to Schröder's Agenda 2010 reforms, Lafontaine co-founded the left-wing party Labour and Social Justice – The Electoral Alternative. Following a merger with the Party of Democratic Socialism in June 2007, he became co-chairman of The Left. He was the lead candidate for the Saarland branch of the party in the 2009 Saarland state election, where it won over 20% of the vote. He announced his resignation from all federal political functions after being diagnosed with prostate cancer in 2009. He retained his position as a member of the Saarland legislature and from May 2012 to 2022 he was the leader of the opposition in Saarland. Lafontaine resigned from the Left Party on 17 March 2022 because it was no longer an "alternative to the politics of social insecurity and inequality," he said.

== Family and education ==
Lafontaine was born in Saarlouis (then called Saarlautern) into a family of craftsmen. His father, Hans Lafontaine, was a professional baker and was killed serving in World War II. He spent his childhood living with his mother, Katharina (née Ferner), and his twin brother, Hans, in Dillingen.

He attended a Catholic episcopal boarding institution in Prüm and there was educated at the Regino-Gymnasium, a public school. He left school in 1962 and received a scholarship from Cusanuswerk, the scholarship body of the Catholic Church in Germany, to study physics at the universities of Bonn and Saarland. Lafontaine graduated in 1969; his thesis concerned the production of monocrystalline barium titanate. He worked for Versorgungs- und Verkehrsgesellschaft Saarbrücken until 1974, serving on its board from 1971.

Lafontaine has been married four times and has two sons by his second and third wives. Lafontaine was married to Ingrid Bachert from 1967 to 1982. From 1982 to 1988 he was married to the artist Margret Müller. Together they have a son (Frederic, born 1982). From 1993 to 2013 he was married to Christa Müller. They have a son together (Carl-Maurice, born 1997). In November 2011, Lafontaine officially presented fellow politician Sahra Wagenknecht as his new girlfriend, who is 26 years his junior. Since 22 December 2014 they have been married. He is a non-practising Catholic.

== Political rise ==
Lafontaine rose to prominence locally as mayor of Saarbrücken and became more widely known as a critic of chancellor Helmut Schmidt's support for the NATO plan to deploy Pershing II missiles in Germany. From 1985 to 1998 he served as Minister-President of the Saarland. In this position he struggled to preserve the industrial base of the state, which was based on steel production and coal mining with subsidies, and served as President of the Bundesrat in 1992/93.

== Chancellor candidacy and assassination attempt ==
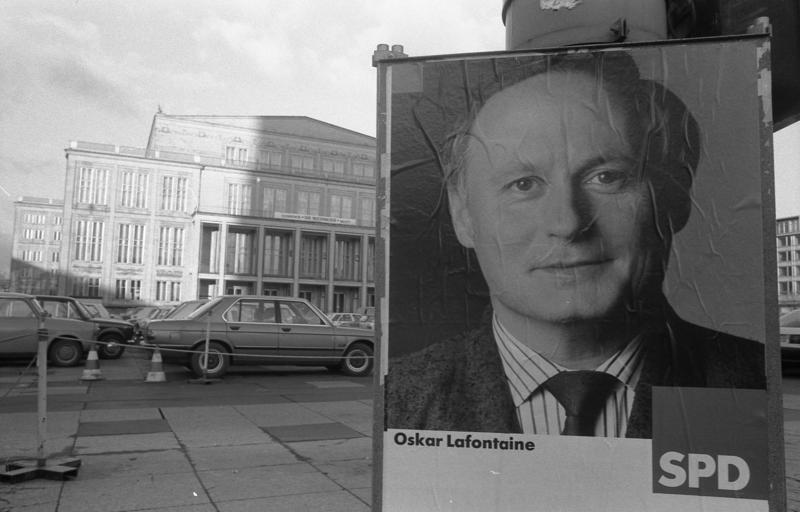
Lafontaine election poster, 1990

Lafontaine was the SPD's candidate for Chancellor in the German federal election of 1990. He faced nearly impossible odds. The election had been called two months after the reunification of Germany, and the incumbent government of Helmut Kohl was in a nearly unassailable position.

During the campaign he was attacked with a knife by a mentally deranged woman after a speech in Cologne. His carotid artery was slashed and he remained in a critical condition for several days.

== Political comeback ==
At the "Mannheim convention" in 1995, he was elected chairman of the SPD in a surprise move, replacing Rudolf Scharping. He was mainly responsible for bringing the whole political weight of the SPD to bear against Kohl and his CDU party, rejecting bipartisan cooperation that had characterized German politics for many years. Lafontaine argued that any help given to Kohl would only lengthen his unavoidable demise.

After the SPD's unexpectedly clear victory at the polls in September 1998, he was appointed Federal Minister of Finance in the first government of Gerhard Schröder.

== Minister of Finance ==
During his short tenure as Minister of Finance, Lafontaine was a main bogeyman of UK Eurosceptics. This was because, among other things, he had called for the prompt tax harmonisation of the European Union, which would have resulted in an increase in UK taxes. In 1998, English tabloid The Sun called Lafontaine "Europe's most dangerous man". On 11 March 1999, he resigned from all his official and party offices, claiming that "lack of cooperation" in the cabinet had become unbearable. Until the formation of the Left Party he was known for his attacks against the Schröder government in the tabloid Bild-Zeitung, which is generally considered conservative.

== Leaving the SPD, formation of The Left party and later ==
On 24 May 2005 Lafontaine left the SPD. After two weeks of speculation it was announced on 10 June that he would run as the lead candidate for The Left party (Die Linke), a coalition of the Labor and Social Justice Party (WASG), which was based in western Germany, and the Party of Democratic Socialism (PDS), which was the successor to the ruling East German Socialist Unity Party (SED). Lafontaine joined the WASG on 18 June 2005 and was selected to head their list for the 2005 Federal Election in North Rhine-Westphalia on the same day. Moreover, he also unsuccessfully contested the Saarbrücken constituency, which he had previously represented from 1990 to 2002. Nevertheless, the result of the Left party in the Saarland was by far the best in any of the federal states in the West of Germany.

In 2007, when the Left Party was formed in a merger between "Left Party.PDS" and WASG, he became chairman alongside Lothar Bisky.

In May 2009, he declared that "Financial capitalism has failed. We need to democratize the economy. The workforce needs to have a far greater say in their companies than has been the case so far."

In 2022, he published the book Ami, it's time to go where he criticizes NATO and American influence in German politics, arguing that Germany has become an American vassal state. The book became a bestseller.

In 2024, Lafontaine announced that he had joined the Bündnis Sahra Wagenknecht (BSW). On 27 January 2024 he spoke at the founding party congress.

== Controversies ==
In the late 1980s and early 1990s, he caused controversy among his left-wing base with a plea for pro-business policies and a call for the reduction of immigrants and asylum-seekers.

At one event in 2005, Lafontaine described Fremdarbeiter ("foreign workers", a term associated with the Nazi regime) as a threat to German labour. He said afterwards that he had misspoken, but in an article published in Die Welt, a group of prominent German writers accused him of deliberately appealing to xenophobic and far-right voters.

Lafontaine lives in a manor-like house, commonly known as the "palace of social justice" (Palast der sozialen Gerechtigkeit). When asked by the Frankfurter Allgemeine Zeitung about whether this could be in conflict with his socialist ideas, Lafontaine said politicians of the left do not have to be poor, but they have to fight against poverty.

In a column published by the same newspaper Lafontaine criticized the expansion of wind power, citing the alleged "destruction of the German cultural landscape" as a cause for his objection. The Alliance 90/The Greens top candidate Barbara Meyer-Gluche pushed back at this stance and accused Lafontaine of "irrational fearmongering".

== Literature ==
- Hoell, Joachim: Oskar Lafontaine. Provokation und Politik. Eine Biografie. Dirk Verlag EK, Lehrach 2004, ISBN 3-9806151-8-9.
- Lorenz, Robert: Oskar Lafontaine. Portrait eines Rätselhaften. Monsenstein und Vannerdat, Münster 2013, ISBN 978-3-86991-970-6.
- Lorenz, Robert: "Techniker der 'kalten Fusion'. Das Führungspersonal der Linkspartei". In: Tim Spier u.a. (Hrsg.): Die Linkspartei. Zeitgemäße Idee oder Bündnis ohne Zukunft? VS Verlag für Sozialwissenschaften, Wiesbaden 2007, ISBN 978-3-531-14941-7, S. 275–323.

== Works ==
- Das Lied vom Teilen. Die Debatte über Arbeit und politischen Neubeginn. Heyne, München 1989, ISBN 3-453-04001-5.
- Keine Angst vor der Globalisierung. Wohlstand und Arbeit für alle. Dietz Verlag, Bonn 1998, ISBN 3-8012-0265-8 (zusammen mit Christa Müller).
- Das Herz schlägt links. Econ Verlag, München 1999, ISBN 3-430-15947-4.
- Die Wut wächst. Politik braucht Prinzipien. Econ Verlag, München 2003, ISBN 3-548-36492-6.
- Politik für alle. Streitschrift für eine gerechtere Gesellschaft. Econ Verlag, München 2005, ISBN 3-430-15949-0.
- Ami, it's time to go! Plädoyer für die Selbstbehauptung Europas. Westend Verlag, Frankfurt 2022, ISBN 978-3-86489-406-0.

Political offices
Preceded by Fritz Schuster	Mayor of Saarbrücken; 1976–1985	Succeeded by Hans-Jürgen Koebnick (SPD)
Preceded by Werner Zeyer (CDU)	Minister-President of Saarland; 1985–1998	Succeeded by Reinhard Klimmt (SPD)
Preceded by Theodor Waigel (CSU)	German Minister of Finance; 1998–1999	Succeeded by Hans Eichel (SPD)
Party political offices
Preceded by Rudolf Scharping	Chairman of the Social Democratic Party of Germany; 1995–1999	Succeeded by Gerhard Schröder
Preceded by New title	Co-Chairman of the Left Party; 2007–2010; With Lothar Bisky	Succeeded by Klaus Ernst & Gesine Lötzsch
