= Landtag of Saarland =

State legislature in Germany

Coordinates: 49.229°N 6.994°E

State Diet of Saarland Landtag des Saarlandes

Type
- Type: Landtag
- Established: 1922

Leadership
- President: Heike Becker, SPD since 25 April 2022
- First Vice President: Dagmar Heib; 18 May 2022
- Second Vice President: Christina Baltz

Structure
- Seats: 51
- Political groups: Government (29) SPD (29) Opposition (22) CDU (19) AfD (3)

Elections
- Last election: 27 March 2022
- Next election: no later than 2027

Meeting place
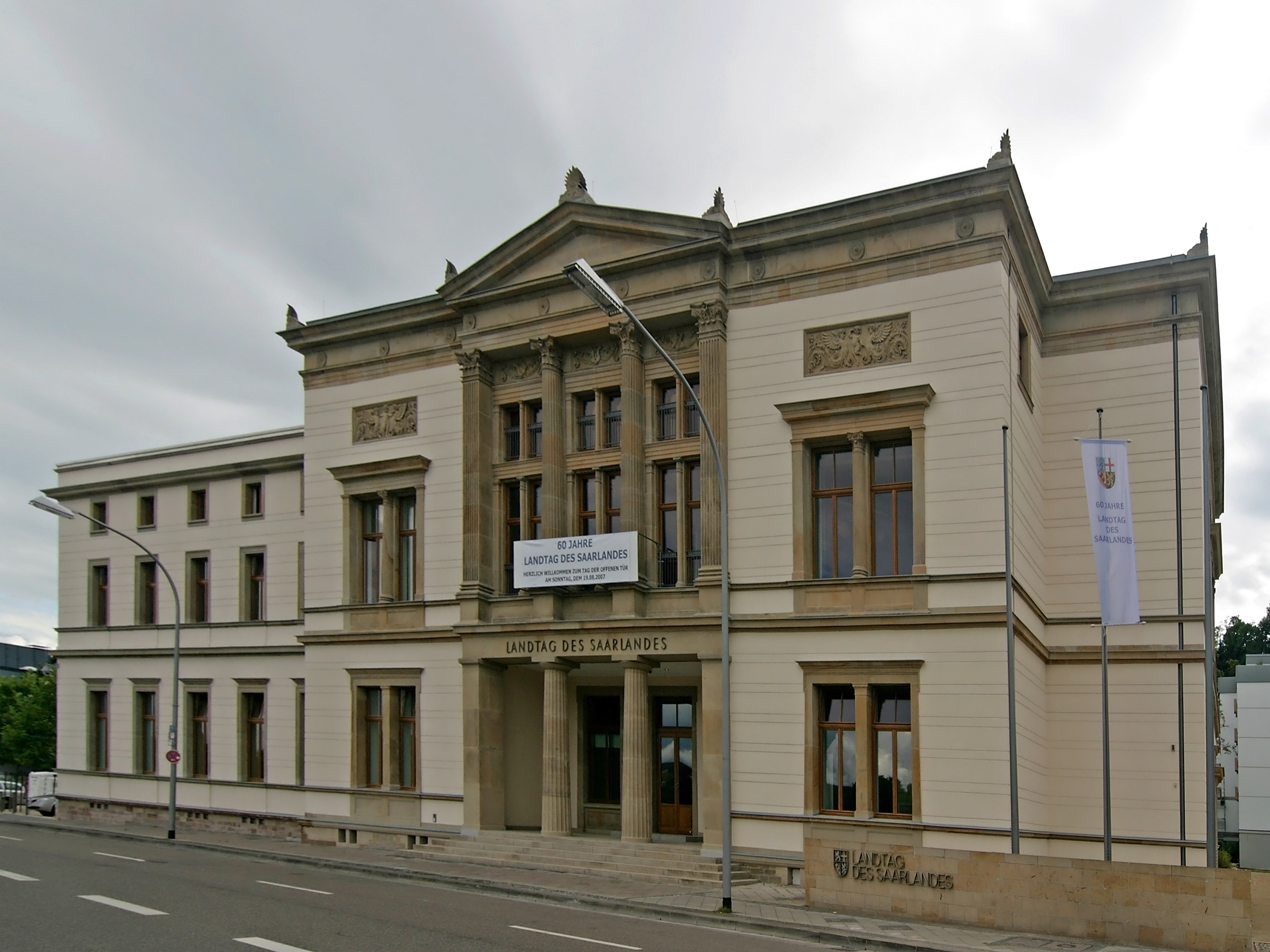
- Landtag of Saarland, Saarbrücken

Website
- www.landtag-saar.de

The Landtag of Saarland is the state diet of the German state of Saarland. It convenes in Saarbrücken and currently consists of 51 members of three parties. The Social Democratic Party of Germany (SPD) is the largest party in the Landtag with 29 seats, an absolute majority that allows the party to govern without a coalition. The 2022 elections marked the first time that the SPD had won the state in 20 years.

== History ==
As a consequence of the German Empire's defeat in the First World War, the Saargebiet was separated from Germany. Between 1920 and 1935, the Landesrat or state council existed as the local representative body and thus as the predecessor of the state parliament of Saarland. There was no Saarland representative body during the Third Reich. After the German defeat in World War II, the Saarland became a French protectorate.

On May 23, 1947, a 20-member constitutional commission was formed to draft a foundational document for the Saarland in the parliamentary manner of the other German countries. On October 5, 1947, a constitutional assembly was elected that became Saarland's first state parliament following the successful adoption of the constitution.

The Landtag of the Saarland meets in the building built in 1865/1866 for the Saarbrücken Casino Society in what is now Franz-Josef-Röder-Strasse. The building was designed by the architect Julius Carl Raschdorff, noted as the designer of the Berlin Cathedral.

== Electoral system ==
The 51 members of the Landtag are elected via closed list proportional representation using the d'Hondt method. 41 seats are distributed in three multi-member constituencies, and the remaining ten at the state level. An electoral threshold of 5% of valid votes is applied to the Landtag; parties that fall below this threshold are ineligible to receive seats.

== Current composition ==
The last election of the Landtag of Saarland was on 27 March 2022.

Party	Seats
Social Democratic Party (SPD)	29
Christian Democratic Union (CDU)	19
Alternative for Germany (AfD)	3

Elections are conducted using a proportional representation system, with a 5% threshold to receive seats.

== See also ==
- List of presidents of the Landtag of Saarland
- 1999 Saarland state election
- 2004 Saarland state election
- 2009 Saarland state election
- 2012 Saarland state election
- 2017 Saarland state election
- 2022 Saarland state election
