= Thomas Strobl =

German politician

Thomas Strobl MdL
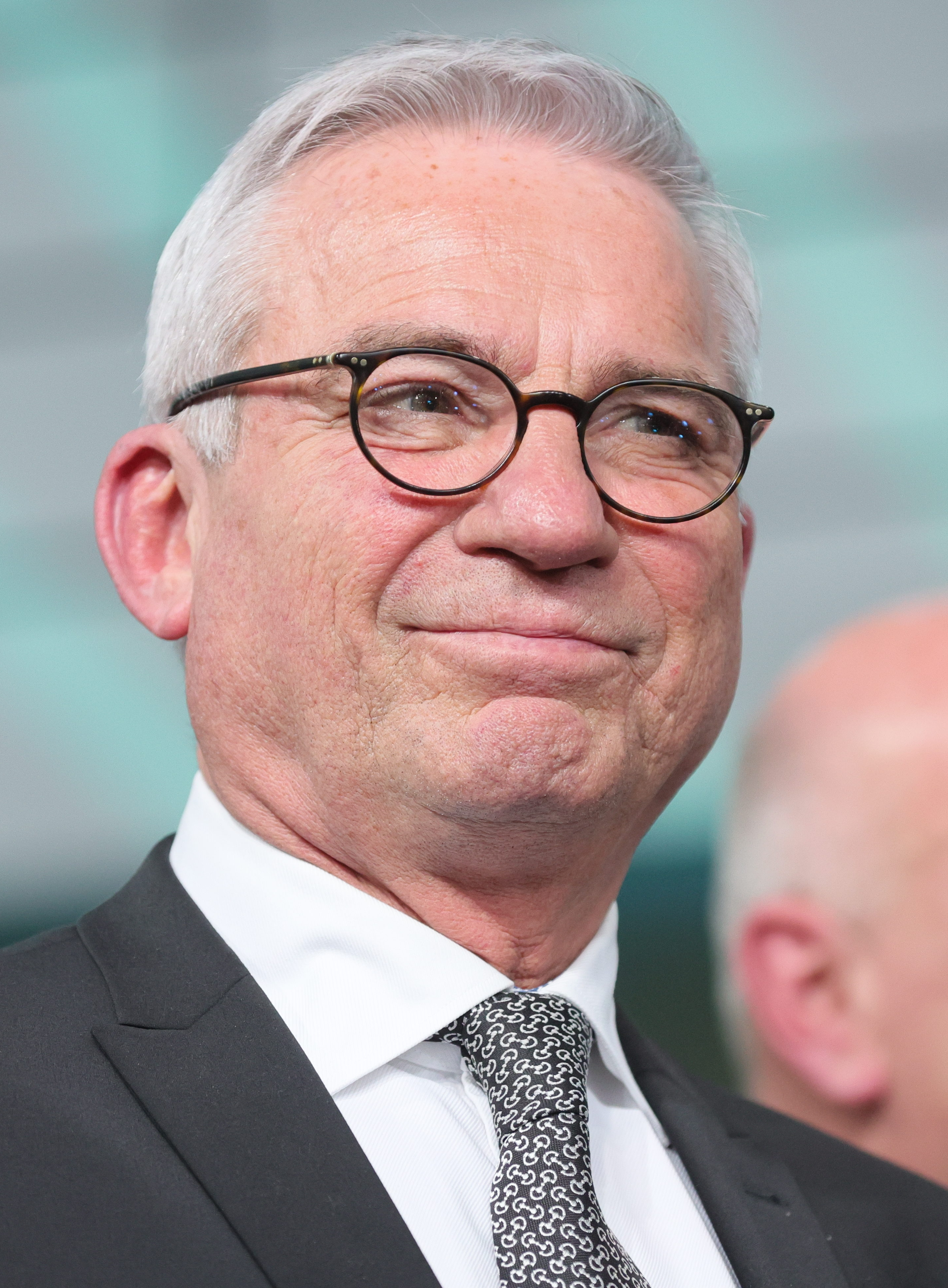
- Strobl in 2025

President of the Landtag of Baden-Württemberg
- Incumbent
- Assumed office 12 May 2026
- Preceded by: Muhterem Aras

Deputy Minister-President of Baden-Württemberg
- In office 12 May 2016 – 12 May 2026
- Minister-President: Winfried Kretschmann
- Preceded by: Nils Schmid
- Succeeded by: Manuel Hagel

Minister of the Interior, Digitalisation and Migration of Baden-Württemberg
- In office 12 May 2016 – 12 May 2026
- Minister-President: Winfried Kretschmann
- Preceded by: Reinhold Gall
- Succeeded by: Manuel Hagel

Leader of the Christian Democratic Union in Baden-Württemberg
- In office 23 July 2011 – 18 November 2023
- Preceded by: Stefan Mappus
- Succeeded by: Manuel Hagel

Member of the; Landtag of Baden-Württemberg; for Heilbronn
- Incumbent
- Assumed office 1 May 2026
- Preceded by: Susanne Bay

Member of the Bundestag; for Heilbronn
- In office 27 September 1998 – 3 June 2016
- Preceded by: Egon Susset
- Succeeded by: Alexander Throm

Personal details
- Born: 17 March 1960 (age 66) Heilbronn, West Germany
- Party: Christian Democratic Union
- Spouse: Christine Schäuble
- Education: Heidelberg University
- Occupation: Lawyer

Thomas Strobl (born 17 March 1960) is a German lawyer and politician of the Christian Democratic Union (CDU) who has been serving as President of the Landtag of Baden-Württemberg since 12 May 2026.

From 1998 to 2016, Strobl was a member of the German Bundestag. He served as Leader of the CDU Baden-Württemberg from 2011 to 2023 and as one of the five federal deputy leaders of the CDU from 2012 to 2022 From 2016 to 2026, he served as Deputy Minister-President of Baden-Württemberg and Minister of the Interior, Digitalization and Migration in the government of Winfried Kretschmann.

== Early life and education ==
Strobl grew up in Heilbronn. After high school diploma he studied law at Heidelberg University. In 1985 he completed the first, and after postgraduate studies in Speyer in 1988 the second state examination in Heidelberg. He then was a research fellow at Heidelberg University and from 1992 to 1996 a Parliamentary Advisor at the Landtag of Baden-Württemberg.

From 1996 Strobl has worked as a lawyer. In 2001, he co-founded a law firm with Alexander Throm.

== Political career ==
=== Member of the Bundestag, 1998–2016 ===
Strobl first became of a Member of the German Bundestag in the 1998 national elections. From 1998 to 2009, he served on the Committee for the Scrutiny of Elections, Immunity and the Rules of Procedure, which he chaired from 2005. Between 2009 and 2013, he was also a member of the parliament's Council of Elders, which – among other duties – determines daily legislative agenda items and assigning committee chairpersons based on party representation. From 2009, he also led the Bundestag group of CDU parliamentarians from Baden-Württemberg, one of the largest delegations within the CDU/CSU parliamentary group.

At state level, Strobl served as Secretary General of the CDU Baden-Württemberg from 2005 to 2011, under party chairmen Günther Oettinger (2005-2009) and Stefan Mappus (2009-2011). In this capacity, he participated in the coalition talks with both the liberal Free Democratic Party and the Green Party following the 2006 state elections and managed the CDU election campaign in 2011.

From 2011, Strobl served as chairman of the CDU in the state of Baden-Württemberg. In addition, he was elected vice chairman of the CDU in 2012 and subsequently serving in the party's national leadership under successive chairs Angela Merkel (2012–2018), Annegret Kramp-Karrenbauer (2018–2021) and Armin Laschet (2021–2022).

In the negotiations to form a Grand Coalition of the Christian Democrats (CDU together with the Bavarian CSU) and the Social Democrats (SPD) following the 2013 federal elections, Strobl was part of the CDU/CSU delegation in the working group on internal and legal affairs, led by Hans-Peter Friedrich and Thomas Oppermann. He was later appointed deputy chairperson of the CDU/CSU parliamentary group in charge of internal and legal affairs. In this capacity, he was part of the group's leadership around chairperson Volker Kauder. In addition to his committee assignments, Strobl was also a member of the German-Maltese Parliamentary Friendship Group.

In December 2015, Strobl presided over the CDU's 2015 national convention in Karlsruhe.

Strobl vacated his Bundestag seat on 3 June 2016, several weeks after taking office on state level.

=== Baden-Württemberg's State Minister of the Interior, 2016–2026 ===
Ahead of the 2016 state elections, Strobl lost against Guido Wolf in a party-wide vote on who should run for the office of Minister-President of Baden-Württemberg. Strobl did not run for a state parliament seat in 2016, and in 2021, ran in Landtagswahlkreis Heilbronn without success.

After the elections, Strobl – alongside Guido Wolf – led the exploratory talks with the Alliance '90/The Greens party of Minister-President Winfried Kretschmann before starting formal coalition talks. From May 2016, he served as Deputy Minister-President and State Minister of the Interior, Digitalisation and Migration in a coalition government of Greens and Christian Democrats in Baden-Württemberg (Cabinet Kretschmann II). As one of Baden-Württemberg's representatives at the Bundesrat, he was a member of the Committee on Internal Affairs and of the German delegation to the NATO Parliamentary Assembly.

Following the 2017 national elections, in the – unsuccessful – negotiations to form a black-yellow-green "Jamaica" coalition with the Christian Social Union in Bavaria (CSU), the Free Democratic Party (FDP) and the Green Party, Strobl was part of the 19-member delegation of the CDU.

In the wake of his party's result in the 2019 European elections, Strobl announced his intention to not lead the CDU campaign to unseat incumbent Minister-President Kretschmann in Baden-Württemberg's 2021 state elections; instead, Susanne Eisenmann was nominated as Kretschmann's challenger in the 2021 Baden-Württemberg state election. In late 2019, he also announced his candidacy in Landtagswahlkreis Heilbronn for a seat in the state parliament. Both Eisenmann and Strobl, who in 2016 were appointed ministers without having run for parliament seats, failed to get elected to the parliament in 2021. While Eisenmann resigned from politics, Strobl remained minister.

Following the CDU's and his own performance in the 2021 state elections, Strobl only received 66.5 percent of his party delegates’ votes in his re-election as chair.

== Political positions ==
After the Green Party won Baden-Württemberg's state capital Stuttgart in 2012, Strobl publicly claimed that his party is "no longer in touch with the lifestyle of people in the cities."

In 2016, Strobl called for a tightening of German asylum rules, saying asylum-seekers should only be eligible for permanent residence in Germany after five years, rather than the current three.

Ahead of the Christian Democrats’ leadership election, Strobl publicly endorsed in 2020 Friedrich Merz to succeed Annegret Kramp-Karrenbauer as the party's chair; Merz eventually lost against Armin Laschet. For the 2021 national elections, Strobl later supported Laschet as the party's candidate to succeed Chancellor Angela Merkel.

== 2022 police scandal ==
The inspector of the Baden-Württemberg Police Andreas Renner is said to have explained his ideas about sexual practices to a female chief commissioner in a video chat in 2021 and offered her to support her career in exchange for sexual services. Disciplinary and investigation proceedings were then initiated against the man for sexual harassment and he was forbidden to conduct official business.

Renner's lawyer wrote a letter to his chef minister Thomas Strobl. Strobl passed the letter on to a journalist. As a result, the public prosecutor's office investigated the suspicion of instigating prohibited communications about court hearings (Section 353d No. 3, Section 26 of the Criminal Code (StGB)) against Strobl.

== Other activities ==
=== Corporate boards ===
- L-Bank, Member of the Supervisory Board
- pro-PL GmbH, Member of the advisory board (2009-2011)
- Kreissparkasse Heilbronn, Member of the Board of Directors (1998-2016)

=== Non-profit organizations ===
- German Forum for Crime Prevention (DFK), Ex-Officio Member of the Board of Trustees
- Heilbronner Bürgerstiftung, Member of the Board of Trustees (since 2002)
- Memorial to the Murdered Jews of Europe, Member of the Board of Trustees (since 2010)
- ProStuttgart21, Member of the Board (2009-2013)
- German Association for Small and Medium-Sized Businesses (BVMW), Member of the Political Advisory Board (-2016)

== Controversy ==
In May 2022, the Stuttgart public prosecutor's office initiated investigations against Strobl on suspicion of incitement to share prohibited communications about court hearings.

== Recognition ==
- 2015 – Order of Merit of the Federal Republic of Germany

== Personal life ==
Since 1996, Strobl has been married to media manager Christine Schäuble, the oldest daughter of Wolfgang Schäuble.
