= Peter Hauk =

German politician

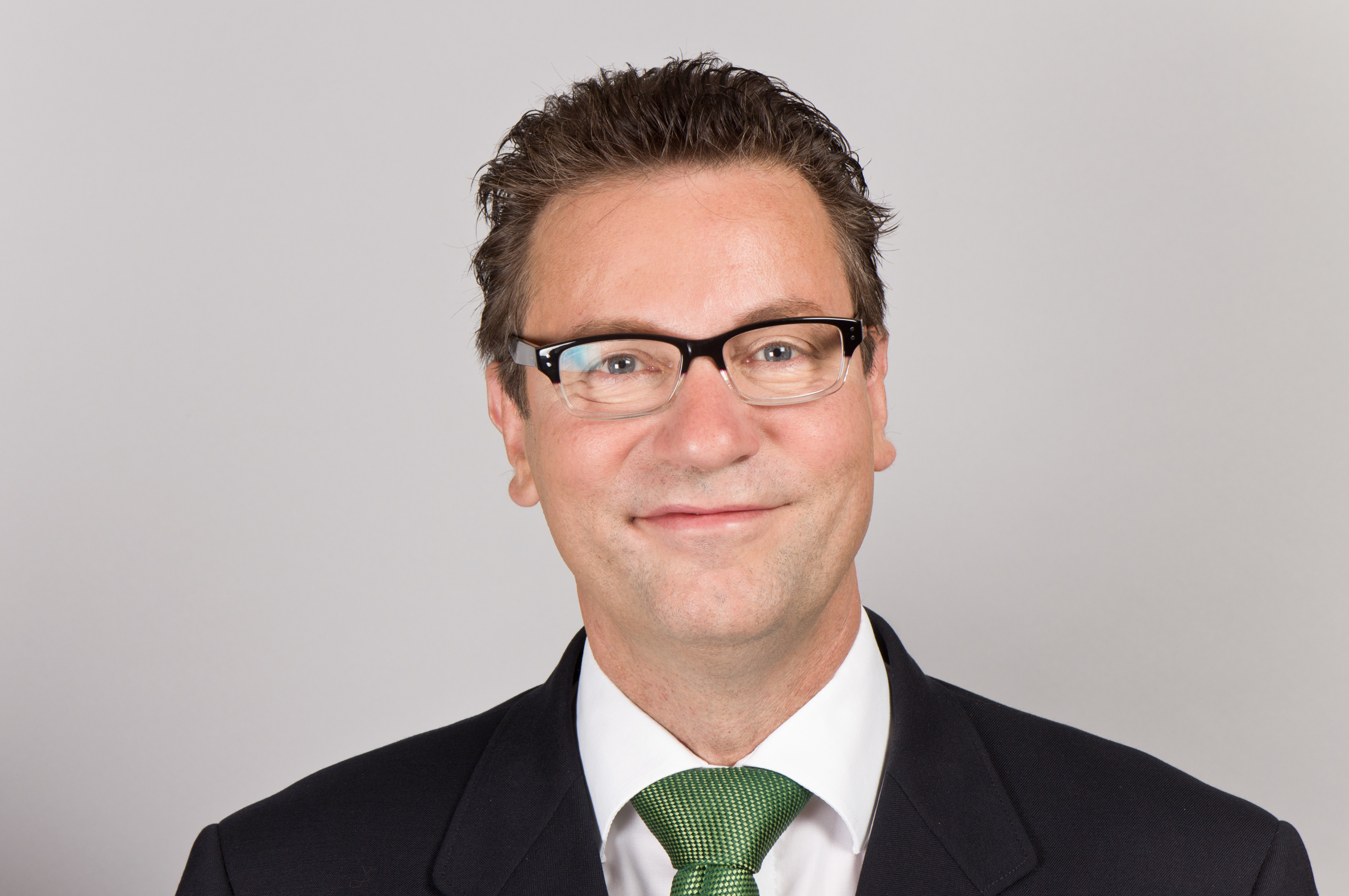
Hauk in 2013

Peter Hauk (born 24 December 1960 in Walldürn, Germany) is a German politician of the CDU party. He has been a member of the Landtag (state parliament) of Baden-Wuerttemberg since 1992. From 2005 until 2010 he was Minister for Nutrition and Rural Areas (Ländlicher Raum), and from 2010 until the election of Guido Wolf to faction leader in 2015, he was CDU group leader and leader of the opposition in the Baden-Württemberg state parliament. Since 12 May 2016 he is a member of the Cabinet Kretschmann II as Minister for Rural Affairs and Consumer Protection.

== Education and career ==
Peter Hauk grew up in Rippberg in the Odenwald, where he passed his Abitur (state school exams) in 1980 at the Karl-Ernst-Gymnasium in Amorbach. After military service with the Panzergrenadier (armoured infantry) in Münster and Walldürn, he studied forestry at the University of Freiburg and obtained the degree Diplom-Forstwirt.

He then worked as a scientist at the Forestry Experimental and Research Institute in Freiburg in the area of landscape management. After an internship at the State Forestry Administration in Gundelsheim, Stuttgart and Künzelsau, he passed the Civil Service Exams. From 1989 until 1991 he worked as Forestry Assessor with the Freiburg Forestry Directorate in Lahr and Staufen.

Hauk was the Deputy Head of the Schoental Forestry Department (Jagst), then until 2001 Project Leader at the Forestry Experimental and Research Institute in Baden-Württemberg and from 2001 until 2005 Director of the Adelsheim Forestry office. He was also active as chairman of the Working Group for rural adult education of Baden-Württemberg (German abbreviation ALEB)

== Political career ==
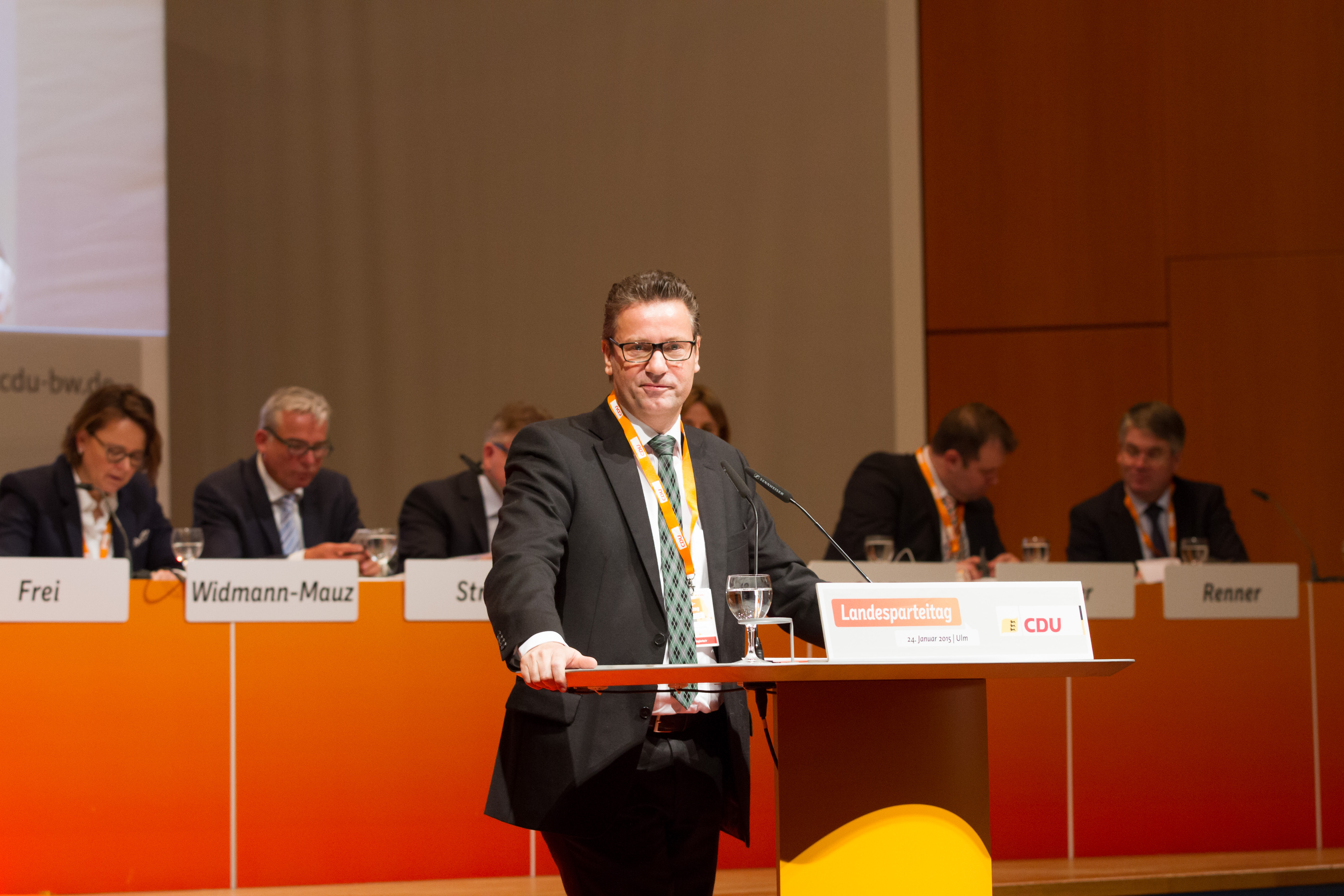
Hauk at the state party convention of CDU Baden-Württemberg in 2015

Hauk was active at an early age as chairman of the CDU Young Union (Junge Union, JU) Wallduern from 1985 until 1989, area chairman of the JU Neckar-Odenwald-Area 1987 to 1995 and member of the board 1987 to 1991.

Hauk is on the executive board of the Neckar-Odenwald-Area CDU North Baden, became Deputy Area Chairman in 1993 and Chairman in 2013. He has been a member of the state executive board of the CDU Baden-Württemberg.

Hauk has been a member of the Baden-Württemberg State Parliament since 1992. After the 1996 elections, he served as the chairman of the Rurality and Agriculture Working Group of the CDU fraction. In 1998 he became Deputy Chairman with responsibility for Environment and Transport and Rural Areas / Agriculture of the fraction. In addition, he was the parliamentary manager of the CDU faction in the Baden-Württemberg State Parliament.

From April 2005 until February 2010, Hauk was State Minister of Nutrition and Rurality for Baden-Württemberg. As Guenther Oettinger retired as chairman of the CDU group in the State Parliament to become Minister-President, Hauk competed - as Oettinger’s preferred candidate - to be his successor; he was defeated in the vote by Stefan Mappus and instead became chairman of the CDU's group in the Baden-Wuerttemberg State Parliament. After the elections of 2011, this position was confirmed, and after the change of government he became leader of the opposition.

In May 2016, Hauk was appointed State Minister for Rural Areas (including agriculture) and Consumer Protection in the government of Minister-President Winfried Kretschmann of Baden-Württemberg. As one of his state's representatives at the Bundesrat, he serves on the Committee on Agricultural Policy and Consumer Protection.

== Personal life ==
Hauk is a Roman Catholic and has two sons.

== Other activities ==
=== Corporate boards ===
- Rothaus, Ex-Officio Member of the Supervisory Board
- Landwirtschaftliche Rentenbank, Ex-Officio Member of the Supervisory Board
- Baden-Württembergische Bank, Ex-Officio Member of the Supervisory Board
- L-Bank, Ex-Officio Member of the Advisory Board

=== Non-profits ===
- Baden-Württemberg Stiftung, Ex-Officio Member of the Supervisory Board
- Südwestrundfunk (SWR), Substitute Member of the Supervisory Board
