= Hans Filbinger =

German politician (1913-2007)

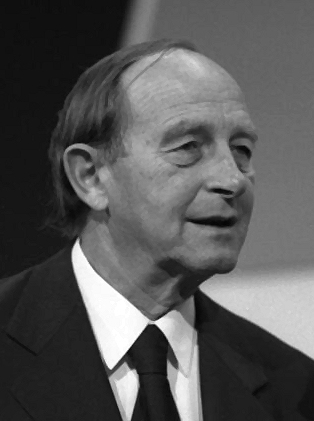
- Filbinger at a CDU convention in 1978

Minister President of Baden-Württemberg
- In office 16 December 1966 – 30 August 1978
- President: Heinrich Lübke; Gustav Heinemann; Walter Scheel
- Chancellor: Kurt Georg Kiesinger; Willy Brandt; Helmut Schmidt
- Preceded by: Kurt Georg Kiesinger
- Succeeded by: Lothar Späth

President of the Bundesrat
- In office 1 November 1973 – 31 October 1974
- Preceded by: Alfons Goppel
- Succeeded by: Alfred Kubel

Personal details
- Born: 15 September 1913 Mannheim, Grand Duchy of Baden, German Empire
- Died: 1 April 2007 (aged 93) Freiburg im Breisgau, Baden-Württemberg, Germany
- Spouse: Ingeborg Breuer
- Children: 5
- Education: University of Freiburg
- Profession: Lawyer

Hans Karl Filbinger (15 September 1913 – 1 April 2007) was a conservative German politician and a leading member of the centre-right Christian Democratic Union in the 1960s and 1970s, serving as the first chairman of the CDU Baden-Württemberg and vice chairman of the federal CDU. He was Minister President of Baden-Württemberg from 1966 to 1978 and as such also chaired the Bundesrat in 1973/74. He founded the conservative think tank Studienzentrum Weikersheim, which he chaired until 1997.

Filbinger had to resign as minister president and party chairman after allegations about his role as a navy lawyer and judge in the Second World War. While the CDU Baden-Württemberg elected him honorary chairman — a position he held until his death — he remained a controversial figure.

== Professional and family life ==
Filbinger was born on 15 September 1913 in Mannheim, Grand Duchy of Baden. He studied law and economics at the University of Freiburg, the Ludwig-Maximilians-Universität München, and the University of Paris. Having earned his doctorate in 1939 with the dissertation "Limits to majority rule in stock and corporation law", he worked as a lecturer at the University of Freiburg. In 1940 he passed his final examination.

Filbinger, a Catholic, was married to Ingeborg Breuer and had four daughters and a son. One of his daughters, Susanna Filbinger-Riggert (born 1951) wrote a book: Kein weißes Blatt. It is a father-daughter biography. (2013).

== Filbinger and the Nazi Party ==
Filbinger first came into contact with Nazi organisations as a student.

He was a member of the Jugendbund Neudeutschland (Youth Federation New-Germany), which he had joined in grammar school. As this Catholic students' federation with political leanings to the Centre Party opposed their being integrated into the Hitler Youth, it was banned. Filbinger, who was a leading member in the district of Northern Baden, in April 1933 called his fellow members to continue their work with their previous intentions and issue a programme for the upcoming future. As a result, the NSDAP deemed him "politically unreliable".

On 1 June 1933, Filbinger joined the Sturmabteilung (SA), and later also the National Socialist students federation, but largely remained an inactive member. Attorney General Brettle advised Filbinger, as he was applying for his first examination in January 1937, that he could not expect to be admitted to the Referendariat, the preparatory service required for future state employees without having cleared himself from these political complaints. Seeing himself barred from the second examination and hence blocked from any further professional career, Filbinger asked to be admitted to NS party membership in spring.

== World War II ==
In 1940, Filbinger was conscripted into the German Navy. He was promoted to the rank of Oberfähnrich and later to that of lieutenant. In 1943 he was ordered to enter the military legal department – according to his own account, against his will. Two attempts at avoiding this by volunteering for U-boat service in the Kriegsmarine didn't succeed. Filbinger served in the legal department until the end of the war in 1945. This period of his life was later raised to prominence in the Filbinger affair.

During that time he was a member of the Freiburg Circles, a group of Catholic intellectuals centred around the publisher Karl Färber. Filbinger used his periods of leave to return to Freiburg and attend lectures by Reinhold Schneider, a writer critical of the Nazi regime.

Without his knowledge, two of the conspirators of the 20 July Plot—Karl Sack and Berthold Schenk Graf von Stauffenberg—recommended Filbinger for employment after a successful coup, adding that one could always rely on Filbinger's "principled anti-Nazi stance and loyalty".

== Early post-war career ==
In 1946, Filbinger resumed his academic work at the university of Freiburg, subscribing to Walter Eucken's ordoliberalism, and settled down as lawyer. In 1947, he was coopted into the International anti-trust commission, chaired by Eucken and Karl Gailer.

In 1951 Filbinger joined the Christian Democratic Union and rose to be chairman of the CDU of Southern Baden.

In 1953, Filbinger was elected to the city council of Freiburg.

In 1958, minister-president Gebhard Müller appointed him an honorary state council. As such he was a member of the state government, mainly concerned with the interests of Southern Baden in the young state of Baden-Württemberg.

In 1960, Filbinger was appointed Minister of the Interior. In the same year, he was elected into the state parliament of Baden-Württemberg, in which he represented the city of Freiburg. He remained a member of parliament until 1980.

== Minister-president of Baden-Württemberg ==
In 1966, minister-president Kurt Georg Kiesinger was elected Chancellor of Germany and Filbinger succeeded him as minister-president of Baden-Württemberg.

At that time, the CDU's coalition partner FDP broke with the CDU in order to form a government with the SPD. Dramatic negotiations resulted in Filbinger forming a CDU-SPD government, mirroring the Federal Great Coalition.

The Great Coalition continued after the state elections of 1968 and went on to reform the administrative system. This reform merged many towns and districts to create more viable units. According to Filbinger, towns are "true sources of power for the state and provide the citizen with the feeling ... of having a home". The results transcended the historical borders of the historic regions of Baden and Württemberg.

The two regions had only been united in 1952 after a referendum. Their relationship had never been easy and the opposition against the new "South-West State" remained strong in Baden. Proponents of Baden's independence raised concerns about the legitimacy of the 1951 referendum because of the controversial voting modalities. In 1956, the Federal Constitutional Court declared the modalities and the merger of the states legal but added that the will of the people of Baden had indeed been glossed over by political machinations. The decision had no immediate consequences until Filbinger became Minister-President. He himself hailed from Baden and after the court had reiterated its earlier verdict in 1969, the Filbinger administration in 1970 held a second referendum in Baden, which resulted in an overwhelming approval of the merger. Filbinger has been dubbed "architect of Baden-Württemberg's unity" for this.

Filbinger also pushed his party, that still was organized as four distinct regional parties to unite into a single CDU of Baden-Württemberg and was duly elected the first chairman.

In the 1972 state elections, the Filbinger's CDU won 52,9% of the vote, gaining an absolute majority for the first time. In 1976, campaigning under the slogan "Freedom instead of socialism", he increased his party's vote to a hitherto unsurpassed 56,7%.

Filbinger was a staunch opponent of leftist tendencies in politics and the universities, and figured prominently in the struggle against terrorism. Against nationwide trends, he opposed comprehensive schools and expanded the state's tripartial school system (Hauptschule, Realschule, Gymnasium) and also vocational schools.

As minister-president of Baden-Württemberg, he was President of the Bundesrat, the representation of the states on the federal level, from 1973 to 1974.

During the 1970s, Filbinger enjoyed a tremendous popularity as a patriarchal figure. He was elected a member of federal CDU executive board and also deputy chairman. Analysts even deemed him a possible candidate for the presidential elections in 1979, when his career suddenly ended in 1978 due to the Filbinger affaire (see below), an event from which his reputation has never recovered.

== Filbinger affair ==
The first criticism of Filbinger's war time record dates back to 10 April 1972. Two weeks before the Baden-Württemberg state elections, the Der Spiegel magazine published one of Filbinger's verdicts. On 29 May 1945, Filbinger presided at the trial against artillery man Petzold and sentenced him to six months imprisonment for incitement of discontent, refusal of obedience and resistance. In an editorial, the Spiegel also claimed that, based on Petzold's memories, Filbinger had referred to Hitler as "our beloved Führer ... who has brought the fatherland back up". Filbinger immediately reacted by filing a lawsuit against the Spiegel, demanding that the Spiegel desist from making such a claim. The court decided in favour of Filbinger, since it found Petzold an unreliable witness and the alleged quote in conflict with Filbinger's other utterances and actions.

Nonetheless, allegations against Filbinger continued at various occasions, e.g. in 1974 when Filbinger as President of the Bundesrat spoke at the tricennial of the 20 July Plot, or in 1975 during the debate about the Wyhl Nuclear Power Plant. Debaters often twisted or neglected the existing evidence or confused the circumstance, Petzold's anti-Nazi stance in particular, with the actual verdict.

Filbinger's verdict against Petzold was especially criticized for having occurred after the surrender of the German military on 8 May 1945. However, the British military command had charged German officers in Norway with maintaining order among the German prisoners-of-war. Later the Petzold trial was confused with other cases involving Filbinger, creating the legend that Filbinger had sentenced a soldier to death for having spoken out against Nazism after German surrender.

The controversy was brought to the boiling point by the controversial German author Rolf Hochhuth. On 17 February 1978 the German weekly Die Zeit published a preview from Hochhuth's novel A Love in Germany (published October 1978), the backbone of which was the case of seaman Walter Gröger. Hochhuth accused Filbinger of having "participated" in four death sentences as a navy lawyer. The Petzold trial, though not involving a death sentence, Hochhuth deemed "outrageous" for having been held after the end of war.

In his allegations, Hochhuth called Filbinger "such a dreadful lawyer, so that one has to presume that ... he is only living in freedom because of the silence of those who knew him." As in the previous case, Filbinger filed a lawsuit against Hochhuth and Die Zeit, seeking to have the claim quoted above banned as libel. In contrast to the previous case, the court did not take the incriminated sentence as a unit but analysed and judged it bit by bit. On 13 June 1978 the court decided that Hochhuth's claims about illegal behaviour were indeed a libellous charges and banned the author from repeating them. However, The term "a dreadful lawyer" was deemed a judgement of opinion protected by freedom of speech. The court has been criticized for mistaken the causal connection between the two statements for a simple addition. Filbinger abstained from appealing the court's decision, and though Hochhuth did not repeat his "illegality" charges (and later even claimed that no one ever made such charges) the other allegation were echoed and variegated by the media.

=== Capital cases involving Filbinger ===
During his stint as a Navy lawyer, Filbinger had been involved in 230 cases, of which six were of a capital nature. In three of these cases, Filbinger was the attorney for the prosecution, in two cases he had been the presiding judge and in one case he had interfered from outside.

In May 1943 several seamen employed in clearing up the scene after an air raid on Kiel were accused of having stolen some petty goods from a drug store. Filbinger, as prosecutor, demanded the death penalty for the ringleader Krämer and the judge did sentence Krämer to death. After the verdict, Filbinger again interrogated the seaman about the incident and afterwards wrote a report putting the condemned man in a positive light. Filbinger appended this report to the verdict that had to be sent to the superior commander for confirmation and as the commander asked Filbinger to comment on the question whether the man should be pardoned, the prosecutor made the case for commuting the death penalty into a prison sentence. The commander agreed and sent Krämer into a punitive camp. Filbinger himself called his actions "an act of artifice, of manipulation, a lie, without a doubt".

The second case was the case on which Hochhuth's novel was based. The seaman Walter Gröger, deployed to Norway, had planned to desert and flee to Sweden with his Norwegian lover. The couple was found out and arrested and Gröger sentenced to eight years of prison. However, the commander of the fleet denied confirmation, returned the case to the Oslo court martial and ordered the prosecution to demand the death penalty. On the day of the trial, the original prosecutor, who already had pleaded for the death penalty, was prevented participating and Filbinger, who hadn't been involved in the case, was appointed prosecutor. According to the Admiral's orders, Filbinger demanded the death penalty and the court sentenced the seaman to death. Admiral Dönitz rejected a plea for pardon. On 16 March 1945 Gröger was executed and, according to military custom, Filbinger supervised the execution.

In two cases Filbinger saved opponents of the regime from execution: He interfered in the confirmation process of the case of military chaplain Möbius, who had been sentenced to death for a political statement. The case was reopened in spring 1945 and Möbius subsequently acquitted. As prosecutor in the case against Lieutenant Forstmeier, who had made some remarks about the 20 July Plot, he influenced the witnesses to testimonies, that could be interpreted in the defendant's favour, prolonged the proceedings and obtained a verdict of demotion and imprisonment on parole. Forstmeier was supposed to be sent to frontline combat, but the end of the war prevented this.

Finally, Filbinger issued two death sentences as a Navy judge: On 9 April, the Oslo court martial chaired by Filbinger dealt with the case of four seamen, who had killed their commanding officer and fled to Sweden. In absentia, the court sentenced them to death for murder and desertion. (In 1952, one of the seamen was again brought to trial and sentenced to ten years in prison). On 17 April 1945, Filbinger chaired the absentia trial against an Oberststeuermann who had taken his boat and fourteen seamen to Sweden and sentenced the senior NCO to death for desertion and undermining morale. Both verdicts were issued in absentia and could not reach the defendants. These two death sentences have been explained as an attempt of avoiding a breaking down of military discipline even at the end of the war, especially since the Navy was involved in evacuating two million Germans from East Prussia that was encircled by the Red Army.

According to Veteran FAZ editor Günter Gillessen, who reviewed the case in 2003, the facts paint a picture different from that of a bloodthirsty and unrepentant Nazi judge. This view was bolstered by Adolf Harms, who worked as a judge alongside Filbinger, including on the Gröger case. Harms described Filbinger as "no fierce dog", "definitely not a Nazi" and as someone with a decidedly negative attitude towards the then current political leadership".

=== Filbinger's reaction ===
Filbinger was not only criticized for his actions during the war, but also for his reactions to the allegations in 1978: In his first reactions to the allegations, Filbinger had claimed that he had "never issued a single death sentence", which was later contradicted by the revelation of the two in absentia cases from April 1945. That Filbinger recalled the two death sentences of 1945 only during the controversy in 1978 seemed incredible and outrageous to many. Filbinger explained this by characterizing the verdicts as "phantom verdicts" with no further consequences for the absent defendants.

Another issue revolves around the sentence "Was damals rechtens war, kann heute nicht Unrecht sein" ("What was lawful then, cannot be unlawful today."). This comment was part of an interview the Spiegel had conducted with Filbinger on 15 May 1978. The Spiegel interpreted the quote as a justification of Nazi laws, whereas Filbinger had referred to the military penal code of 1872, that was in force throughout the Second World War. Filbinger complained that his quote had been edited and taken out of context and his then spokesman Gerhard Goll, who had been present during the interview, called the magazine's interpretation "not only untrue but also an infamy". Goll stated that Filbinger was referring in particular the fact that all nations in 1945 considered the death penalty as an adequate and necessary deterrent against desertion, whereas he had always considered and labelled the Nazi state as a "tyranny of injustice". Still, the quote as originally published stuck with Filbinger and has been the basis of much of the recurring criticism. Since then Spiegel, Zeit and other media have repeated the controversial interpretations, leading to letters of protest by Filbinger. In 1991, the Zeit was forced by court injunction to publish corrections.

Filbinger's critics have been criticized for violating the presumption of innocence and for putting their adversary in a vicious circle, in which a rejection of allegations is taken as a confirmation of guilt.

Filbinger has been criticized for not enquiring about other cases after the first allegations, for not being forthcoming enough or for placing too much emphasis on the legal dimension of the allegations.

=== Filbinger's resignation ===
After CDU politicians had joined in the criticism, Filbinger resigned as minister-president on 7 August 1978, and also as chairman of the CDU Baden-Württemberg. In both positions, he was succeeded by Lothar Späth. Despite this, the CDU Baden-Württemberg appointed him honorary chairman in 1979, which he remained until his death. Filbinger also had to relinquish his offices in the federal party, resigning as deputy chairman in 1978 and giving up his seat on the executive board in 1981.

As he resigned from office, Filbinger stated that the attacks would be revealed as untrue, if they hadn't been so yet. Some historians and lawyers have agreed with this, while others dispute this conclusion. The CDU Baden-Württemberg considers Filbinger as rehabilitated.

== Subsequent events ==
After his withdrawal from politics, Filbinger in 1979 founded the conservative think tank Studienzentrum Weikersheim (Weikersheim Centre of Studies), which he chaired until 1997.

In 1987, Filbinger published his memoirs titled Die geschmähte Generation (The slandered generation), in which he again defended himself against his critics. In a review of this book, historian Golo Mann called the events of 1978 a "masterly orchestrated hunt against Filbinger".

After the collapse of the GDR in 1989/90, two Stasi lieutenants revealed that they had been involved in the campaign against Filbinger:

"We have fought against Filbinger actively, that means we have collected material and have leaked forged or manipulated material into the west. The fight against Filbinger was a substantial part of "Action Black", a long lasting campaign against conservatives, CDU/CSU, Fascists."

Stasi document P3333 reveals that Filbinger had been spied on since the end of the 1960s. Note that the use of the word Fascist adheres to usage prevalent in Communist states.

Filbinger's case sparks controversy even to this day.

On 16 September 2003, a day after his 90th birthday, Filbinger was honoured by a reception at Ludwigsburg Palace. The 130 guests included most government ministers of Baden-Württemberg and his successors Lothar Späth and Erwin Teufel. Protests accompanied the Ludwigsburg reception and had previously resulted in the cancelling in of a similar reception in Filbinger's home town Freiburg.

Filbinger has been elected to the Federal Convention as a representative of Baden-Württemberg's parliament in 1959, 1969, 1974, 1994, 1999, and 2004. The last occasion in 2004 caused controversy, as SPD, Greens, PDS, the German PEN and the Central Council of Jews in Germany protested this choice. However, on 31 March 2004, all candidates, including Filbinger, were unanimously confirmed by all parties in the state parliament, including the SPD and Green groupings.

Filbinger died on 1 April 2007 in Freiburg im Breisgau.

On 11 April 2007, Günther Oettinger, at that time the Minister President of Baden-Württemberg, held a controversial eulogy during the memorial service for his predecessor. In his speech Oettinger described Filbinger as "not a National-Socialist" but "an opponent of the Nazi regime", who could flee the constraints of the regime as little as million others". About Filbinger's role as navy judge, Oettinger pointed out that no one lost his life because of a verdict by Filbinger and had not the power and freedom supposed by his critics. Oettinger was subsequently accused by politicians and the media of diminishing the significance of the Nazi dictatorship. German Chancellor Angela Merkel reacted with public admonishment, stating that she would have preferred if "the critical questions" would have been raised. Oettinger was also criticized by opposition politicians and the Central Council of Jews; some of his critics even called for his demission.

Oettinger at first defended his speech but added that he regretted any "misunderstanding" about his eulogy, but did not withdraw his comments on Filbinger's past. However, on April 16 he distanced himself from his comments.

== Literature ==
- Wolfram Wette (Hrsg.): Filbinger, eine deutsche Karriere. zu Klampen, Springer 2006, ISBN 3-934920-74-8.
- Susanna Filbinger-Riggert, Liane Dirks: Kein weißes Blatt: eine Vater-Tochter-Biografie. Campus, Frankfurt am Main 2013, ISBN 978-3-593-39803-7.

== Notes ==
Political offices
Preceded by Kurt Georg Kiesinger	Minister President of Baden-Württemberg; 1966–1978	Succeeded by Lothar Späth
