= Dietrich Wagner =

German engineer and activist (1944–2023)

Dietrich Wagner (1944 – 28 June 2023) was a German engineer who suffered permanent damage to his eyes due to the Police using a water cannon during the 30 September 2010 "Black Thursday" Stuttgart 21 railway station reconstruction project protests. He was 66 at the time.

== Stuttgart 21 ==
Terminus station and Stuttgart 21 underground through-station construction site cutting through the city park

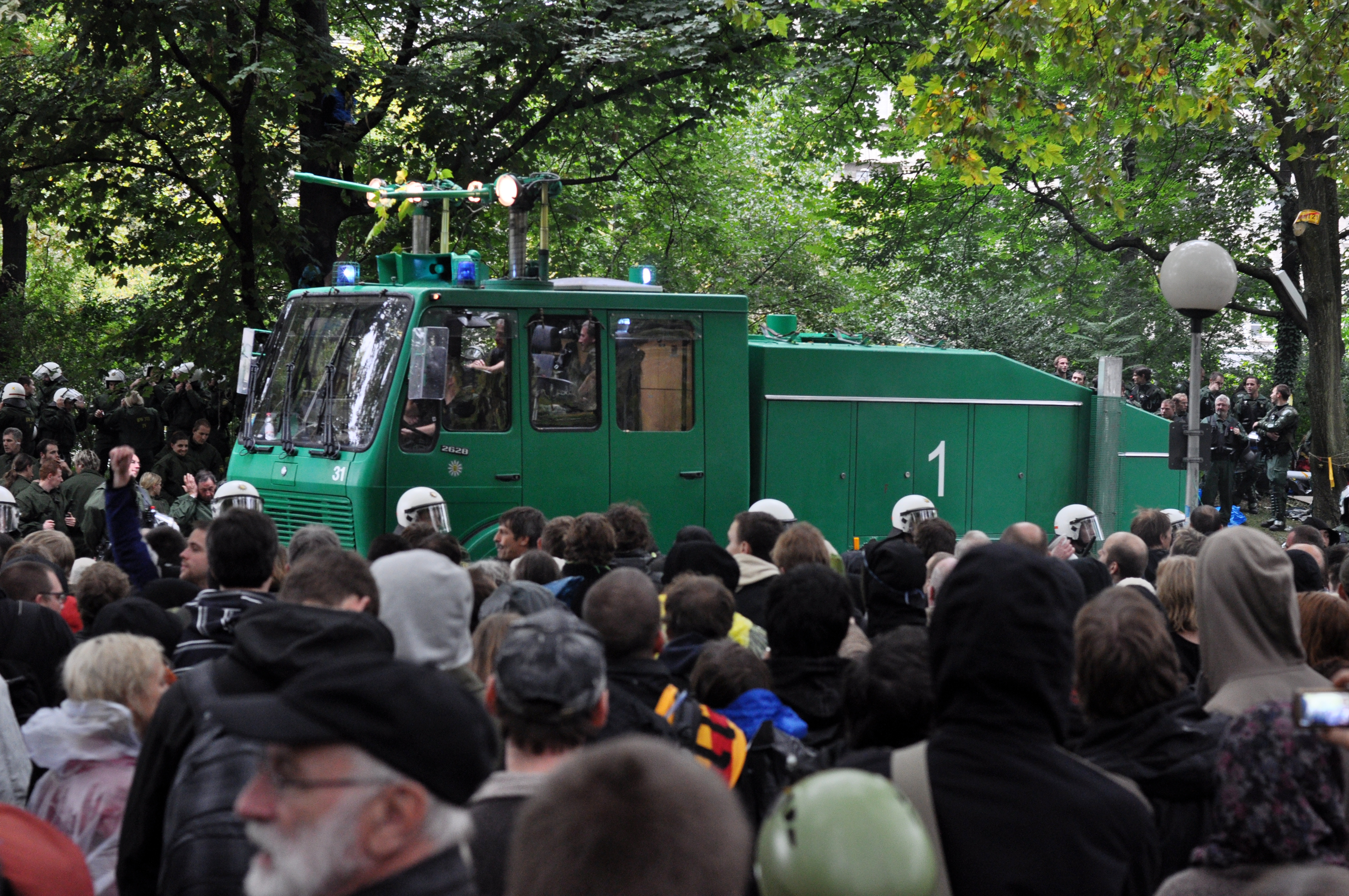
Police truck with two water cannons

The Stuttgart 21 project was and is controversial due to large reconstruction work in the city center. Work began with cutting down old trees of the adjacent city park, which is only permitted in winter months, starting in October.

Yet, already on 30 September 2010, the Police started to clear the area. Hundreds of demonstrators were injured when the police used water cannon, pepper spray and batons against protestors. Wagner was struck and knocked unconscious by the high-velocity stream of water and noticed blood running down his face when he woke up. He suffered damage to his eyelids, an orbital blowout fracture, and damage to both lenses and retinas. Wagner subsequently had six eye operations but regained little of his vision and remained almost completely blind.

== Aftermath ==
Before he participated in the Stuttgart 21 protests, Wagner had had no political involvement since his university days. Pictures showing Wagner injured, with two people assisting him, were published in many German newspapers. During later demonstrations, some protesters put red colour on their faces to symbolize Dietrich Wagner.

Tristana Moore of Time wrote that the photograph of his injury caused "a regional dispute over an unpopular building project instantly transformed into a national issue — and the political repercussions are now reverberating all the way to Berlin." Wagner became a symbol of the protest against the Stuttgart 21 project. The German newspaper Süddeutsche Zeitung wrote that he was the "face of the protest". According to the author Jakob Augstein, the picture had a relevant impact on the March 2011 Baden-Württemberg state election, causing recently appointed Minister-President of Baden-Württemberg Stefan Mappus to lose his position.

In 2014 he visited the United Kingdom to ask Theresa May, the Home Secretary, to not authorise usage of water cannons. In an editorial to The Telegraph Wagner opposed the use of water cannons.

Wagner died on 28 June 2023, at the age of 79.
