= 2011 Baden-Württemberg state election =

State election in Germany

- 27 March 2011

All 138 seats in the Landtag of Baden-Württemberg 70 seats needed for a majority
- Turnout: 4,983,719 (66.2%) ▲12.8%
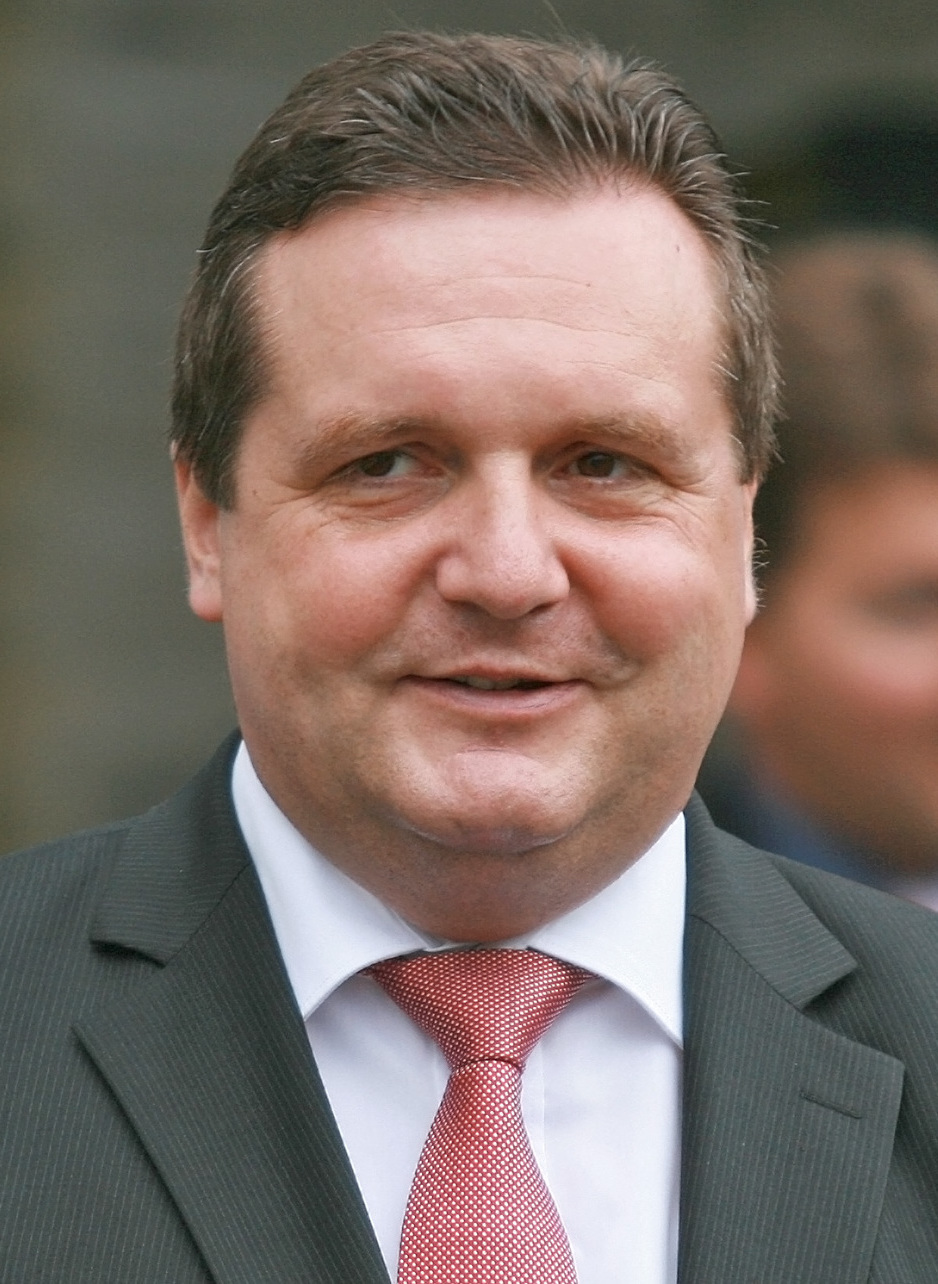

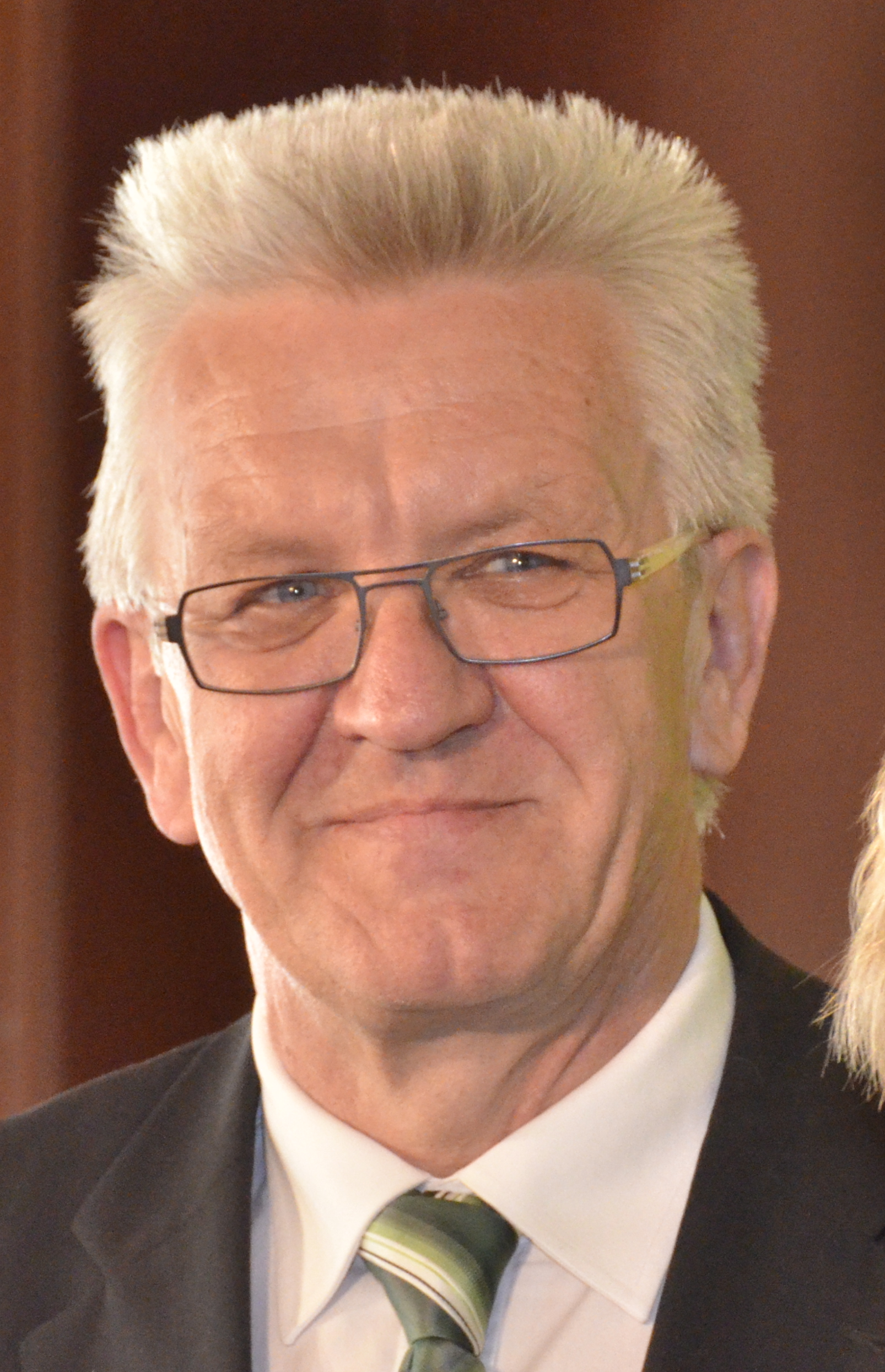

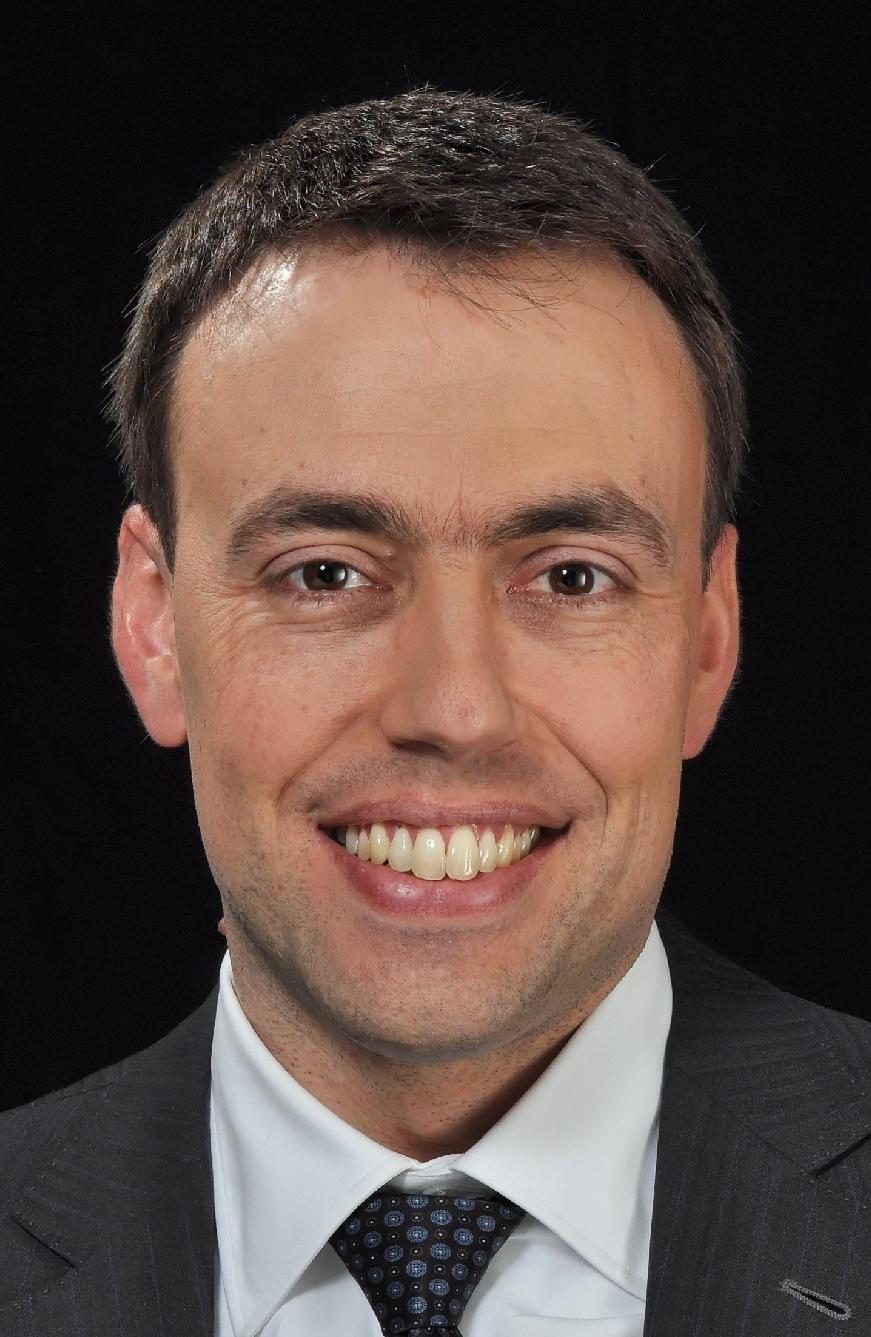

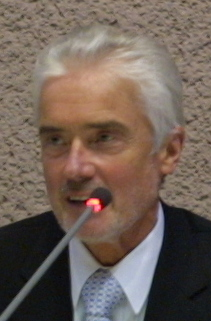
	First party	Second party
Leader	Stefan Mappus	Winfried Kretschmann
Party	CDU	Greens
Last election	69 seats, 44.2%	17 seats, 11.7%
Seats won	60	36
Seat change	▼9	▲19
Popular vote	1,942,404	1,205,508
Percentage	39.0%	24.2%
Swing	▼5.2%	▲12.5%
	Third party	Fourth party
Leader	Nils Schmid	Ullrich Goll
Party	SPD	FDP
Last election	38 seats, 25.2%	15 seats, 10.7%
Seats won	35	7
Seat change	▼3	▼8
Popular vote	1,151,859	262,520
Percentage	23.1%	5.3%
Swing	▼2.1%	▼5.4%
- Results for the single-member constituencies.
Minister-President before election
Stefan Mappus
CDU
Elected Minister-President
Winfried Kretschmann
Greens

The 2011 Baden-Württemberg state election was held on 27 March 2011 to elect the members of the 14th Landtag of Baden-Württemberg. The incumbent coalition government of the Christian Democratic Union and Free Democratic Party led by Minister-President Stefan Mappus lost its majority. The Greens achieved their best result in a state election up to this point at 24%, and became the second largest party in the Landtag. They subsequently formed a coalition with the Social Democratic Party (SPD), and Greens leader Winfried Kretschmann was elected Minister-President. He became the first Green politician to serve as a state head of government in Germany.

== Campaign and issues ==
The Baden-Württemberg election was considered to have significant ramifications for Chancellor Angela Merkel; the state had been a CDU stronghold for almost 60 years. In a wiki-leaked diplomatic cable from the United States Embassy it was noted: "Chancellor Angela Merkel nominated Baden-Wuerttemberg (BW) Minister President Günther Oettinger as EU Energy Commissioner primarily to remove an unloved lame duck from an important CDU bastion." With Oettinger "going to Europe" in February 2010, Stefan Mappus took office.

=== Stuttgart 21 ===
Stuttgart 21 was a major election issue. Work for this project, which sets out to transform the Stuttgart Main Station from a terminus station into a subterranean non-terminus station, commenced in the summer of 2010 despite massive protests by the Stuttgart population, and those interested in railway travel. The main reasons for the protests are the questionable necessity of the transformation, i.e. the disproportionate costs (between 4 and 5 billion Euros) in relation to the (small) gains in travel time (the current station is a functioning station with 90% of the passengers ending their journey here anyway), the dismantling and partial destruction of the old station building (generally considered to be cultural heritage), the destruction of some of the inner-city's park ("Schlossgarten"), the geological risks posed by the tunnels that would have to be drilled into the Stuttgart ground, endangering Europe's second largest mineral water sources and spas, and the danger of some of the buildings above the tunnels collapsing.

Transparent government became an issue due to the controversy about Stuttgart 21.

The CDU-FDP coalition government of Stefan Mappus supported the project, but Mappus lost public support. He was considered to have linked his political fate to the success or failure of the project. According to polls, since July 2010 a Green-SPD coalition would win a majority. With construction work supposed to start immediately when cutting of trees is permitted in winter months, starting with October, the police was eager to remove protesters and tree huggers in advance. On "Black Thursday" 30 September 2010, demonstrations and civil disobedience campaigns against the project were broken up by force, with police using tear gas and water cannons on protestors. This caused bloody eye injuries to Dietrich Wagner, a symbolic figure of the events.

The SPD leadership also supported Stuttgart 21, but since early 2010 called for a referendum on the issue "to pacify the city" and end the ongoing protests. The party did not take a clear stance on the issue due to opposition of the project from much of its membership.

Opposition to Stuttgart 21 led to "unprecedented popularity" for the Alliance 90/The Greens in Baden-Württemberg and a major rise in the polls.

As a coalition partner of the CDU in the Mappus government, the FDP also supported Stuttgart 21. The party was criticized for its acceptance of the police force used against demonstrators in the late summer of 2010.

=== Nuclear power ===
The 11 March 2011 Tōhoku earthquake and tsunami killed thousands in Japan. Following the Fukushima Daiichi nuclear disaster, Chancellor Angela Merkel, who in 2010 had partially reverted the German nuclear phase out plan of the former SPD-Green coalition, changed her stance once again. She announced the temporary shutdown of Germany's seven nuclear power stations built before 1980. Within the state, this affected the older parts of Neckarwestheim Nuclear Power Plant and Philippsburg Nuclear Power Plant. She also stated that she was committed to total withdrawal from nuclear power sooner than the revisited nuclear exit plan dates.

== Parties ==
The table below lists parties represented in the previous Landtag of Baden-Württemberg.

Name		Ideology	Leader(s)	2006 result	
Name		Ideology	Leader(s)	Votes (%)	Seats
CDU	Christian Democratic Union of Germany; Christlich Demokratische Union Deutschlands	Christian democracy	Stefan Mappus	44.2%	69 / 139
SPD	Social Democratic Party of Germany; Sozialdemokratische Partei Deutschlands	Social democracy	Nils Schmid	25.2%	38 / 139
FDP	Free Democratic Party; Freie Demokratische Partei	Classical liberalism	Ullrich Goll	10.7%	15 / 139
Grüne	Alliance 90/The Greens; Bündnis 90/Die Grünen	Green politics	Winfried Kretschmann	11.7%	17 / 139

== Opinion polling ==
View source data.

Polling firm	Fieldwork date	Sample size	CDU	SPD	Grüne	FDP	Linke	Others	Lead
2011 state election	27 Mar 2011	–	39.0	23.1	24.2	5.3	2.8	5.6	14.8
YouGov	20–24 Mar 2011	1,003	36	22	26	6	5	5	10
Emnid	18–24 Mar 2011	1,000	38	23	25	5	4	5	13
Forsa	16–22 Mar 2011	1,025	38	24	24	5	4	5	14
Emnid	17 Mar 2011	500	38	22	25	6	4	5	13
Forschungsgruppe Wahlen	15–17 Mar 2011	1,382	38	22.5	25	5	4.5	5	13
Infratest dimap	14–17 Mar 2011	1,250	39	22	24	5.5	4.5	5	15
Infratest dimap	10–12 Mar 2011	1,001	42	22	21	6	4	5	20
Emnid	4–10 Mar 2011	1,000	39	24	20	7	5	5	15
Forsa	3–8 Mar 2011	1,004	40	26	20	5	4	5	14
Emnid	24 Feb – 1 Mar 2011	1,000	38	25	21	8	4	4	13
Forsa	21–25 Feb 2011	1,001	39	26	19	6	4	6	13
Emnid	18–24 Feb 2011	1,000	40	23	22	6	4	5	17
Customer Research 42	8–19 Feb 2011	705	35.0	21.6	21.2	5.2	5.9	11.1	13.4
Uni Freiburg	31 Jan – 22 Feb 2011	1,126	41.1	22.7	24.2	6.0	2.8	3.2	16.9
Emnid	11–17 Feb 2011	1,000	40	20	23	7	5	5	17
Emnid	4–10 Feb 2011	1,000	40	19	25	7	4	5	15
Forschungsgruppe Wahlen	31 Jan – 2 Feb 2011	1,146	41	19	25	6	4	5	16
Infratest dimap	1–2 Feb 2011	1,000	39	21	24	6	5	5	15
Emnid	24–17 Jan 2011	1,022	40	20	27	5	4	4	13
Emnid	7–15 Dec 2010	1,001	41	19	29	4	4	3	12
Infratest dimap	1 Dec 2010	1,010	39	18	28	5	5	5	11
Forschungsgruppe Wahlen	22–24 Nov 2010	1,910	39	19	26	5	4	7	13
Allensbach	1–15 Oct 2010	1,096	38.0	22.0	26.0	5.0	5.0	4.0	12.0
TNS Forschung	6–7 Oct 2010	1,002	34	19	32	6	5	4	2
abs Marktforschung	5–6 Oct 2010	968	28	17	36	8	7	–	8
Infratest dimap	2–7 Sep 2010	1,000	35	21	27	5	5	7	8
Forsa	16–27 Aug 2010	1,068	37	24	24	6	4	5	13
Infratest Politikforschung	12–15 Jul 2010	1,000	37	25	20	7	5	6	12
Infratest Politikforschung	23 Mar – 13 Apr 2010	991	41	23	17	8	5	6	18
Allensbach	24 Feb – 8 Mar 2010	1,030	43	21	18	8	5.5	4.5	22
Infratest dimap	17 Feb 2010	1,000	43	20	17	11	4	5	23
2009 federal election	27 Sep 2009	–	34.5	19.3	13.9	18.8	7.2	6.3	15.2
Infratest Sozialforschung	20 Apr – 3 May 2009	1,000	39	22	15	14	6	4	17
Infratest dimap	2–3 Jun 2009	1,000	40	21	14	15	4	6	19
Uni Halle/Uni Stuttgart	8–20 Sep 2008	1,000	39.9	26.0	17.2	10.2	4.8	1.9	13.9
Forsa	2–24 Jul 2007	1,034	43	19	13	12	6	7	24
Forsa	19 Apr 2007	?	40	26	13	12	3	6	14
Infratest dimap	16 Apr 2007	1,000	41	26	16	10	2 (Note: Die Linke.PDS/WASG)	5	15
Infratest dimap	26–27 Mar 2007	1,000	41	26	14	9	4 (Note: Die Linke.PDS/WASG)	4 (Note: 3% Right-wing parties, 3% Other)	15
Forsa	20 Nov – 15 Dec 2006	1,220	44	20	13	12	4	7 (Note: 2% REP, 5% Other)	24
Forsa	12 Jun – 4 Jul 2006	1,403	43	23	12	12	5	5	20
2006 state election	26 Mar 2006	–	44.2	25.2	11.7	10.7	3.1 (Note: WASG)	5.3 (Note: 2.5% REP, 2.8% Other)	19.0

== Results ==
Summary of the 27 March 2011 election results for the Landtag of Baden-Württemberg
Party	Votes	%	+/-	Seats	+/-	Seats %
Christian Democratic Union (CDU)	1,943,912	39.0	▼5.2	60	▼9	43.5
Alliance 90/The Greens (Grüne)	1,206,182	24.2	▲12.5	36	▲19	26.1
Social Democratic Party (SPD)	1,152,594	23.1	▼2.1	35	▼3	25.4
Free Democratic Party (FDP)	262,784	5.3	▼5.4	7	▼8	5.1
The Left (Linke)	139,700	2.8	▼0.3	0	±0	0
Pirate Party Germany (Piraten)	103,618	2.1	New	0	New	0
The Republicans (REP)	56,723	1.1	▼1.4	0	±0	0
Others	118,206	2.4	▼0.2	0	±0	0
Total	4,983,719	100.0		138	▼1	
Voter turnout		66.2	▲12.8			

Popular Vote
CDU	39.01%
B'90/GRÜNE	24.20%
SPD	23.13%
FDP	5.27%
DIE LINKE	2.80%
PIRATEN	2.08%
REP	1.14%
Other	2.37%

Landtag seats
CDU	43.48%
B'90/GRÜNE	26.09%
SPD	25.36%
FDP	5.07%

== Post-election ==
After the loss, outgoing Minister-President Stefan Mappus announced his resignation as chairman of the Christian Democratic Union in Baden-Württemberg. Federal Social Democratic Party leader Frank-Walter Steinmeier insisted that Chancellor Angela Merkel should call for new elections after the defeat of the Christian Democratic Union in Baden-Württemberg.

On 27 April 2011, the Greens and the Social Democratic Party announced that they had finalized their coalition agreement. Winfried Kretschmann and Social Democratic Party leader Nils Schmid presented an 83-page document titled The Change Begins. The only minister named was Nils Schmid, who became Deputy Minister-President and "super-minister" for finance and the economy. Other than Schmid, the coalition announced which parties were to receive each ministry, but did not name appointees. The Social Democrats acquired the majority of the ministerial positions, but the Greens had a majority in the cabinet. The Greens obtained the ministries of the environment, transportation, science, rural areas, consumer protection and a ministry for civil society. The Social Democrats got the ministries of the economy, finance, justice, labour, schools, welfare, and the interior. As part of the coalition agreement, the red-green alliance agreed to organize a referendum regarding Stuttgart 21. They also agreed on "radical changes" to the education system and transport policy, and to accelerate the phasing out of nuclear power. Hermann Gröhe, the secretary general of the CDU, "condemned" the coalition agreement.

On 12 May 2011, Winfried Kretschmann was sworn in as Minister-President of Baden-Württemberg. Kretschmann became the first Minister-President in Germany from the Greens. In the Landtag vote for Minister-President, Kretschmann received at least two votes from the opposition.
