= Stefan Teufel =

German politician (born 1972)

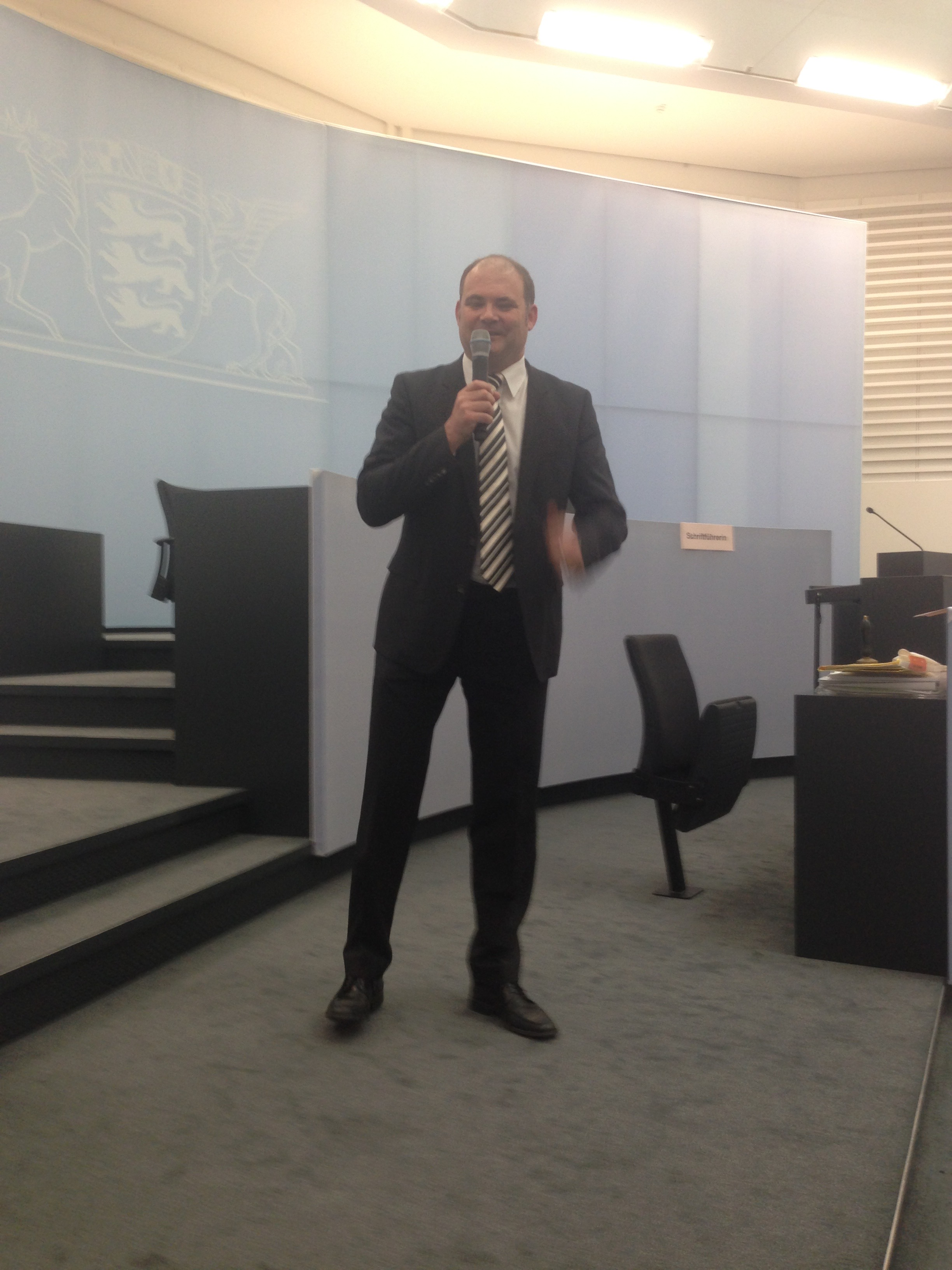
- Teufel in 2013

Member of the Landtag of Baden-Württemberg
- Incumbent
- Assumed office 12 April 2006
- Constituency: Rottweil

Personal details
- Born: 20 May 1972 (age 53) Rottweil am Neckar
- Party: Christian Democratic Union (since 1990)
- Relatives: Erwin Teufel (uncle)

Stefan Teufel (born 20 May 1972 in Rottweil am Neckar) is a German politician serving as a member of the Landtag of Baden-Württemberg since 2006. He is the nephew of Erwin Teufel.
