= Lothar Späth =

German politician

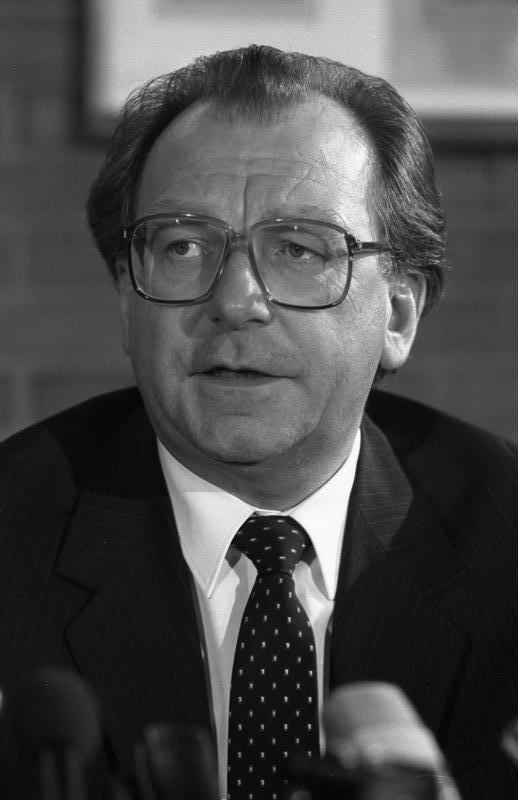
- Späth in 1983

Minister-President of Baden-Württemberg
- In office 30 August 1978 – 22 January 1991
- President: Walter Scheel; Karl Carstens; Richard von Weizsäcker
- Chancellor: Helmut Schmidt; Helmut Kohl
- Preceded by: Hans Filbinger
- Succeeded by: Erwin Teufel

President of the Bundesrat
- In office 1 November 1984 – 31 October 1985
- Preceded by: Franz Josef Strauss
- Succeeded by: Ernst Albrecht

Personal details
- Born: Lothar Späth; 16 November 1937 Sigmaringen, Nazi Germany
- Died: 18 March 2016 (aged 78) Stuttgart, Germany
- Party: CDU
- Spouse: Ursula Heinle (m. 2008)
- Children: 2

Lothar Späth (16 November 1937 – 18 March 2016) was a German politician of the CDU.

== Life ==
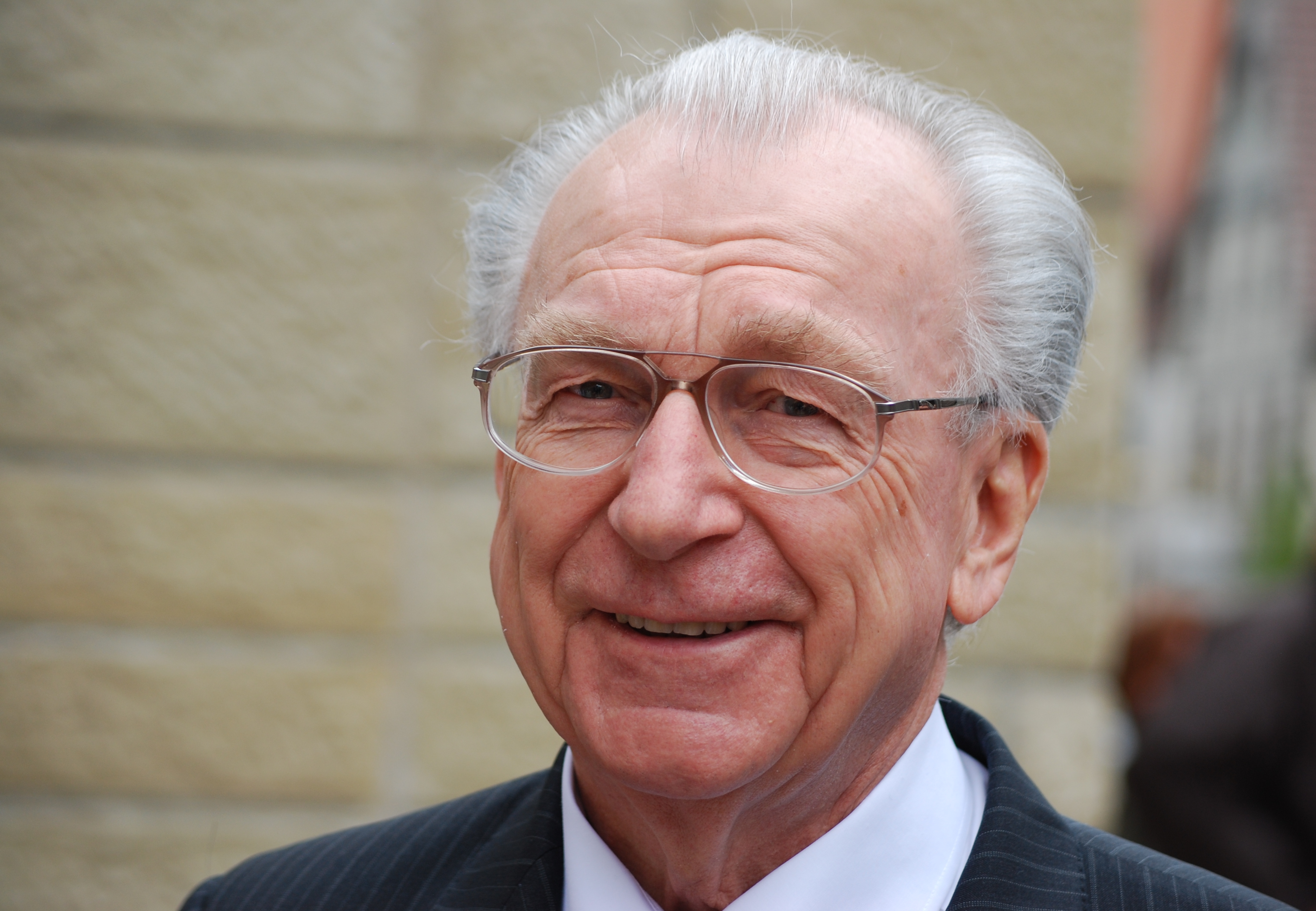
Späth in 2011

Späth was born in Sigmaringen. From 30 August 1978 to 13 January 1991 Späth was the 5th Minister President of Baden-Württemberg and chairman of the CDU Baden-Württemberg, serving as the 36th President of the Bundesrat in 1984/85.

After leaving politics, Späth headed the Jenoptik company, one of the few former Eastern German state owned enterprises, which survived the transformation into a market economy in a united Germany. He stayed there until 2003. Then he became president of the Industrie- und Handelskammer East-Thuringia in Gera.

In order to support medium-sized companies in opening up foreign markets, he set up the "Baden-Württemberg Export Foundation" in 1984, today Baden-Württemberg International.

In 1989, he sponsored the publication of an art portfolio called Kinderstern, featuring original drawings by Sol LeWitt, Jörg Immendorff, Sigmar Polke, Max Bill, Heinz Mack, Keith Haring and Imi Knoebel, to benefit children cancer patients. Along with Rupert Neudeck, he is also a patron of the "German Economic Foundation for Humanitarian Help".

In September 1992 Späth was awarded the title of Royal Norwegian Honorary Consul General for Thuringia and Saxony-Anhalt.

From 1998–2001, Späth hosted a TV talk show broadcast in Germany called "Späth am Abend", delivering weekly political commentaries beginning in 2002. (The title is a play on words between "Late at night" (Spät am Abend) and "Späth in the evening", a reference to the host's name.)

== Literature ==
- Marlis Prinzing: Lothar Späth – Wandlungen eines Rastlosen. Orell Füssli Verlag, Zürich 2006, ISBN 3-280-05203-3.
- Stefan Wogawa: Lothar Späth. Blick hinter eine (Selbst-)Inszenierung. OWUS e. V., Bad Salzungen 2010. (Reihe Wirtschaft & Politik, Bd. 1)
- Marlis Prinzing, Lothar Späth: "Wir schaffen das" – Antworten auf die Krise – Perspektiven für die Zukunft. Marlis Prinzing trifft Lothar Späth. Kaufmann, Lahr 2009, ISBN 978-3-7806-3089-6.

Political offices
Preceded by Hans Filbinger	Minister President of Baden-Württemberg; 1978–1991	Succeeded by Erwin Teufel
