= Walldürn =

- Town
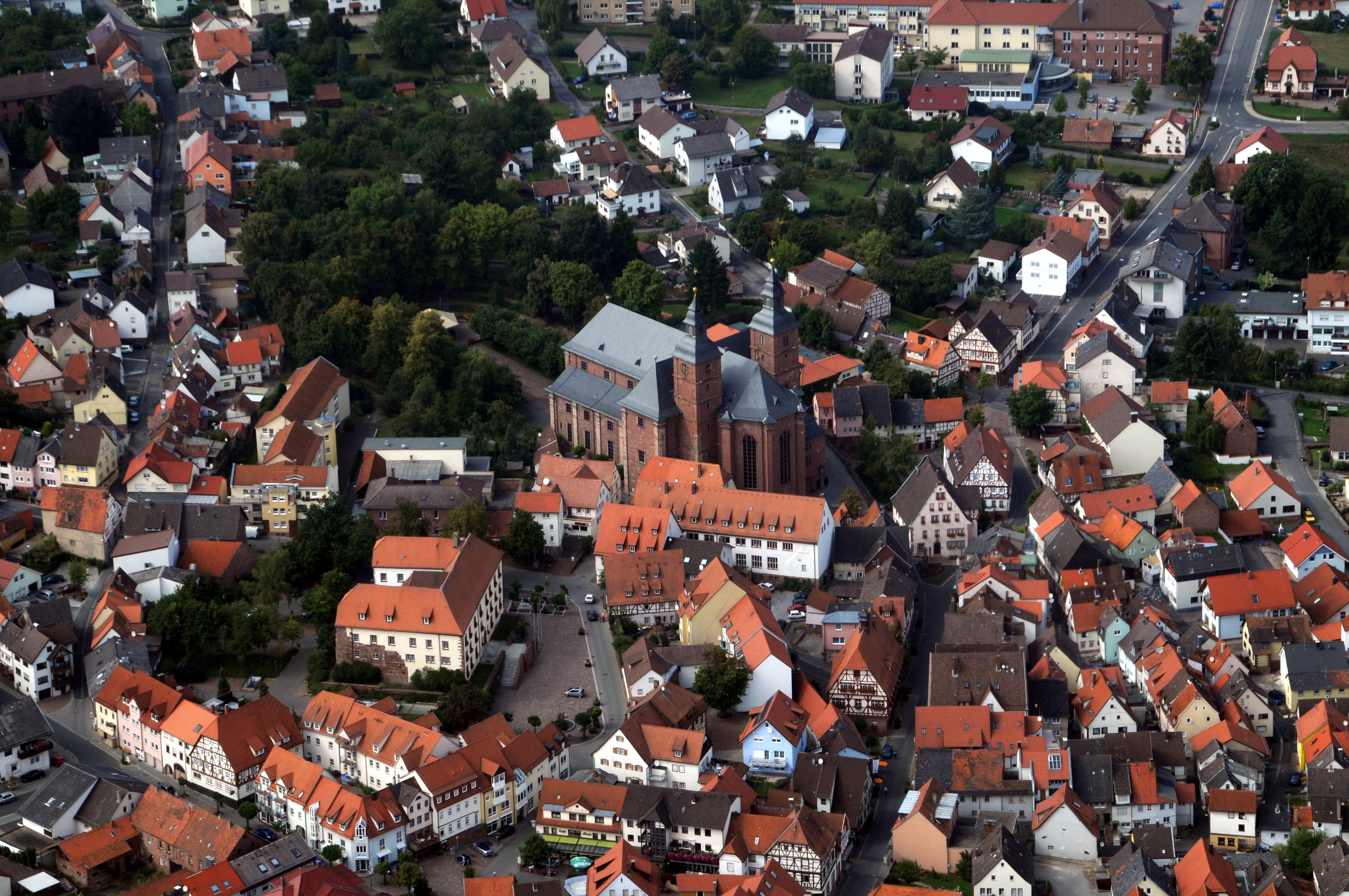
- Aerial view of the town center with the Walldürn Basilica

- Coat of arms

- Location of Walldürn within Neckar-Odenwald-Kreis district
- Interactive map of Walldürn
- Location within Germany Location within Baden-Württemberg
- Coordinates: 49°34′59″N 9°22′5″E
- Country: Germany
- State: Baden-Württemberg
- Admin. region: Karlsruhe
- District: Neckar-Odenwald-Kreis

Government
  - Mayor (2023–31): Meikel Dörr (Ind.)

Area
  - Total: 105.91 km^{2} (40.89 sq mi)
- Elevation: 416 m (1,365 ft)

Population (2025-12-31)
  - Total: 11,562
  - Density: 109.17/km^{2} (282.74/sq mi)
- Time zone: UTC+01:00 (CET)
  - Summer (DST): UTC+02:00 (CEST)
- Postal codes: 74731, 63928 (Spritzenmühle)
- Dialling codes: 06282, 06285, 06286
- Vehicle registration: MOS, BCH
- Website: www.wallduern.de

Walldürn (German pronunciation: [valˈdʏʁn]) is a town in the Neckar-Odenwald district, in Baden-Württemberg, Germany. It is situated 23 km southwest of Wertheim. The town of Walldürn consists of the ten districts Walldürn-Stadt, Altheim, Gerolzahn, Glashofen, Gottersdorf, Hornbach, Kaltenbrunn, Reinhardsachsen, Rippberg and Wettersdorf. Walldürn Basilica:

== Local council ==
Elections in 2014:

The poll was 52,9 %.

- CDU: 13 seats
- SPD: 9 seats
- Demokratische Christliche Bürger (DCB): 5 seats
- Free voters Baden-Württemberg|Walldürner Bürgervereinigung (WBV): 2 seats
- Walldürner Liste (WAL): 2 seats
- Total: 31 seats

== Mayors ==
- 1901–1907: Knoth, Hermann
- 1907–1909: Schön, Friederich (temporary)
- 1909–1919: Nimis, Wilhelm
- 1919–1920: Helmling, Peter
- 1920–1925: Scheurich, Otto
- 1925–1930: Trautmann, Arthur
- 1930–1933: Geier, Michael
- 1933: Kaufmann, Josef
- 1933–1940: Kiefer, Karl (appointed)
- 1940–1945: Leiblein, Josef (appointed)
- 1945–1946: Trunk, Heinrich (temporary) und Scheurich, Otto (temporary)
- 1946–1948: Schmidt, Hermann
- 1948–1966: Trautmann, Arthur (SPD)
- 1966–1974: Hübner, Alfred
- 1974–1975: Hollerbach, Robert (temporary administrator)
- 1975–1991: Hollerbach, Robert (CDU)
- 1991–2007: Joseph, Karl-Heinz (SPD)
- 2007-2023: Günther, Markus (CDU)
- since 2023 Meikel Dörr (Independent)

=== Sons and daughters of the city ===
- Walter Zimmermann (1892-1980), biologist and botanist
- Peter Assion (1941-1994), ethnologist and germanist
- Peter Hauk (born 1960), forest manager, politician and Member of Landtag since 1992 (CDU),
- Silvia Neid (born 1964), former footballer and world champion coach of the German women's football team

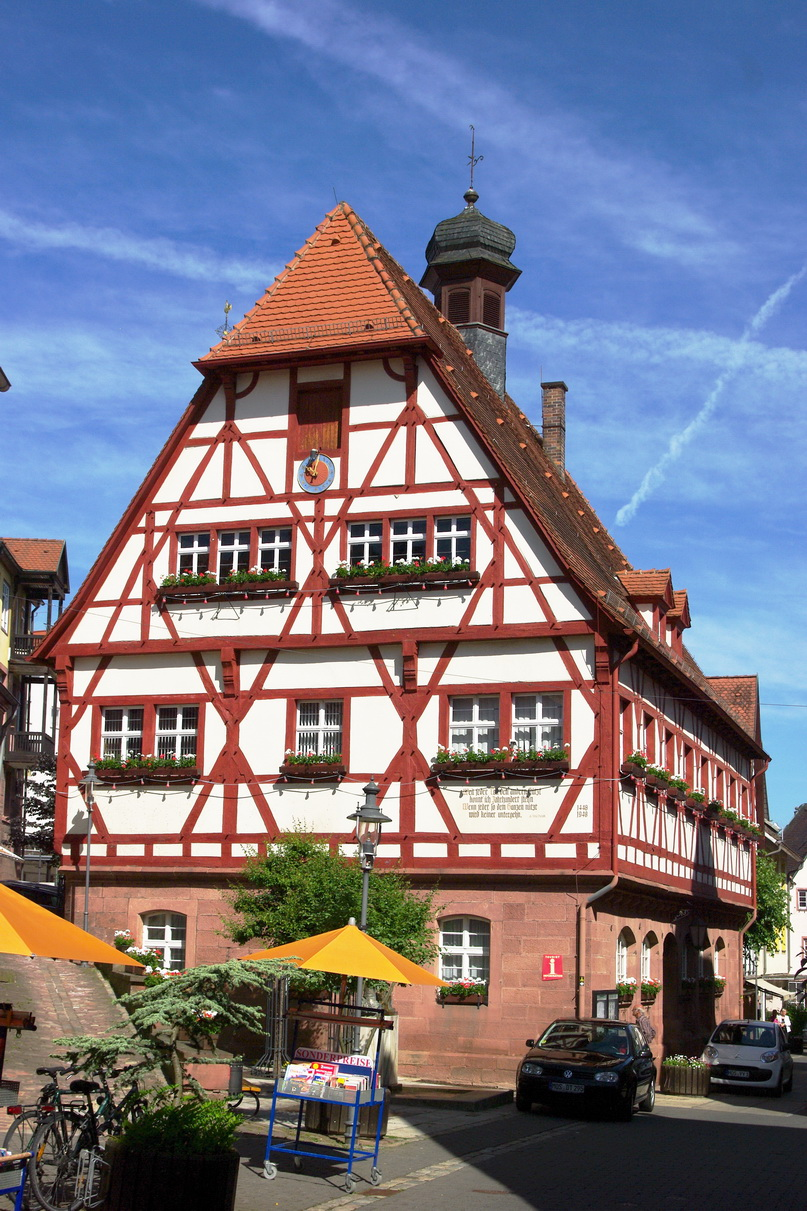
Walldürn-Town hall

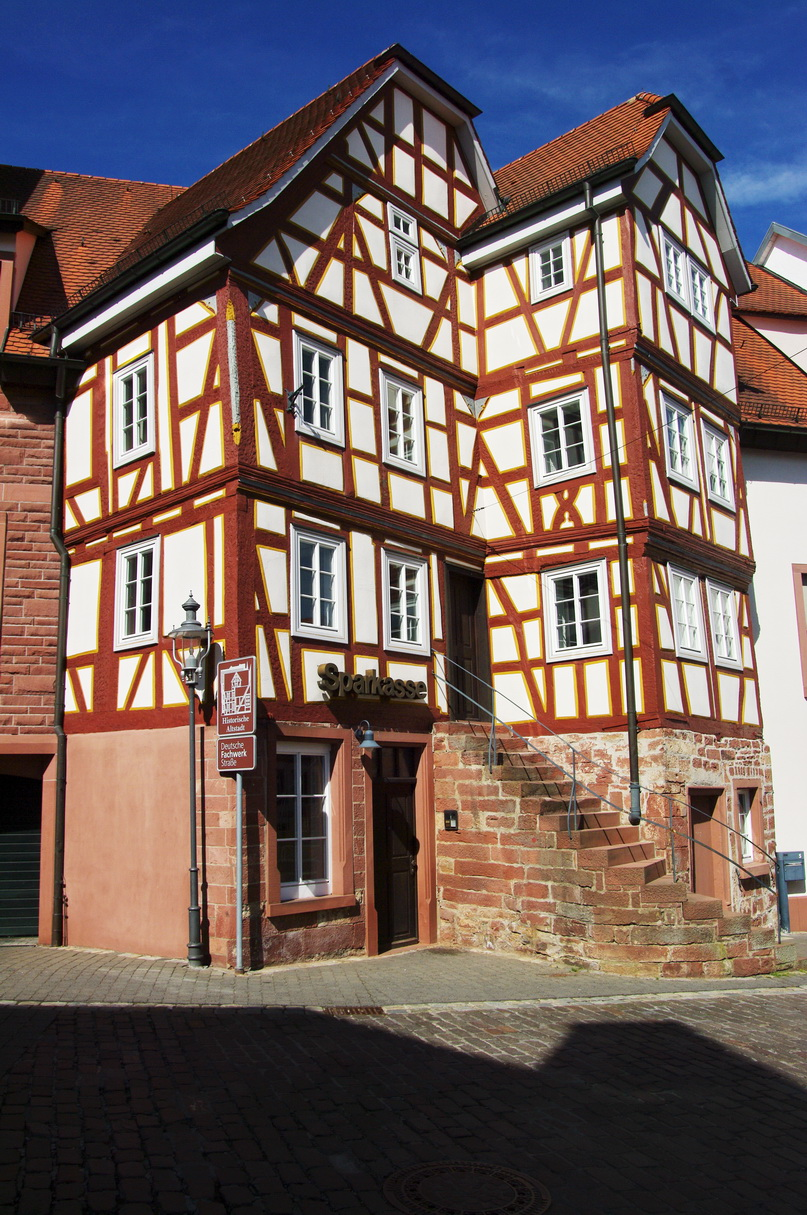
Walldürn-Savings bank

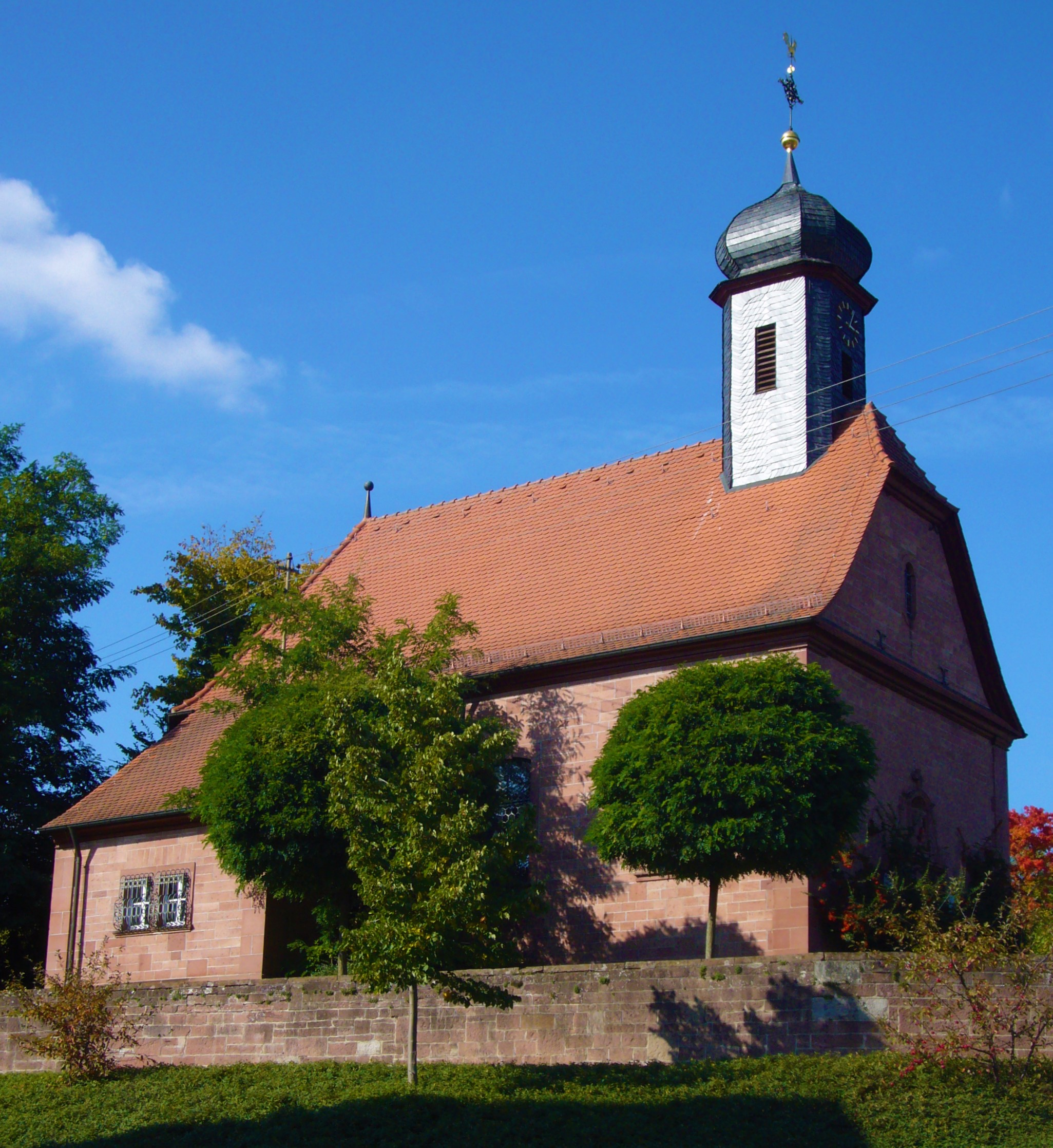
Gottersdorf St. Michael church

== Economy ==
The town is seat of CONCAD, a design company for machine, vehicle and plant components, working with Plant engineering and construction, boiler, container and tank construction, machine tool manufacturing, special purpose machinery manufacturing, antenna production for aerospace and aviation industry and the shipbuilding industry as well as automotive and vehicle construction. using Trumpf lasers. The company was founded in 1995 and has steadily grown to manufacture precision products.
