= CDU Baden-Württemberg =

Political party in Baden-Württemberg, Germany

- Chairperson: Manuel Hagel
- Founded: 15 January 1971; 55 years ago
- Ideology: Christian democracy Liberal conservatism Pro-Europeanism
- Political position: Centre-right
- National affiliation: Christian Democratic Union of Germany
- Colours: Black
- Landtag of Baden-Württemberg: 42 / 154
- Bundestag delegation: 33 / 102

Website
- www.cdu-bw.de

The CDU Baden-Württemberg (CDU BW or CDU BaWü) is the political party with the most members in the German state of Baden-Württemberg and the second largest state party (in German, Landespartei or Landesverband) of the Christian Democratic Union of Germany with almost 65,000 members. Its chairman is Manuel Hagel, who succeeded Thomas Strobl in 2023.

Its predecessors were the Badische Christlich-Soziale Volkspartei (BCSV), the Christlich-demokratische Partei (CDP), and the Christlich-Soziale Volkspartei.

The state party was founded in January 1971, when the state parties of CDU Nordbaden, Südbaden, Nordwürttemberg, and Württemberg-Hohenzollern merged into a single party. The first chairman was Hans Filbinger.

The CDU has been the governing party of Baden-Württemberg continuously from 1953 to 2011, the year Winfried Kretschmann of the Alliance '90/Greens won the regional state elections.

== Election results and coalitions ==
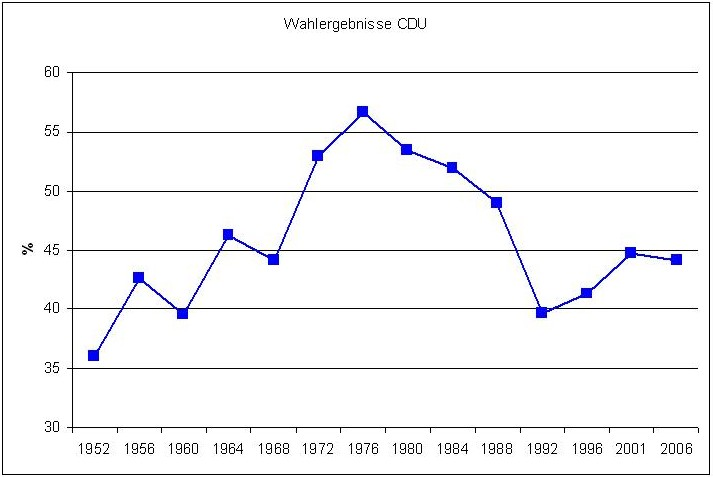
CDU results in the state elections in Baden-Württemberg

The CDU Baden-Württemberg won absolute majorities in the 5 state elections between 1972 and 1988, and could govern the state alone. Otherwise the party cooperated with other parties. Until 1958, it cooperated with all parties represented in the parliament. The SPD withdrew from the cooperation in 1958. From 1964 CDU cooperated with FDP/DVP. In the elections of 1968, the SPD won 29% and the NPD won 10%. A grand coalition of CDU and SPD lasted from 1968 to 1972. A new grand coalition lasted from 1992 to 1996. Since 1996, the CDU is cooperating with the FDP.

== Chairmen ==
=== Nord-Württemberg ===
Years	Chairman
1946–1948	Josef Andre
1948–1958	Wilhelm Simpfendörfer
1958–1971	Klaus Scheufelen

=== Nord-Baden ===
Years	Chairman
1945–1951	Fridolin Heurich
1951–1968	Franz Gurk
1970–1971	Gerhard Zeitel

=== Süd-Baden ===
Years	Chairman
1946–1947	Leo Wohleb
1948–1966	Anton Dichtel
1966–1971	Hans Filbinger

=== Württemberg-Hohenzollern ===
Years	Chairman
1946–1948	Franz Weiss
1948–1955	Gebhard Müller
1956–1971	Eduard Adorno

=== Baden-Württemberg ===
Years	Chairman
1971–1979	Hans Filbinger
1979–1991	Lothar Späth
1991–2005	Erwin Teufel
2005–2009	Günther Oettinger
2009–2011	Stefan Mappus
2011–2023	Thomas Strobl
2023–	Manuel Hagel

== Honorary chairmen ==
Years	Chairmen
1979–2007	Hans Filbinger
1991–2016	Lothar Späth

== Chairs of the parliamentary faction ==
Years	Chairmen	Years	Chairmen
1952–1953	Franz Gurk	1953	Gebhard Müller
1953–1960	Franz Hermann	1960–1968	Camill Wurz
1968–1972	Erich Ganzenmüller	1972–1978	Lothar Späth
1978–1991	Erwin Teufel	1991–2005	Günther Oettinger
2005–2010	Stefan Mappus	2010–2015	Peter Hauk
2015–2016	Guido Wolf		
Wolfgang Reinhart	2016–2021		
Manuel Hagel	2021–		

== Literature ==
- Weinacht, Paul-Ludwig (Hg.): Die CDU in Baden-Württemberg und ihre Geschichte. Mit einem Geleitwort von Hans Filbinger. Stuttgart 1978. (Schriften zur politischen Landeskunde Baden-Württembergs, 2)
- Günther Buchstab, Klaus Gotto: Die Gründung der Union, München 1981, ISBN 3-7892-7164-0, Seite 88–91
