= Guido Wolf (politician) =

German politician (born 1961)

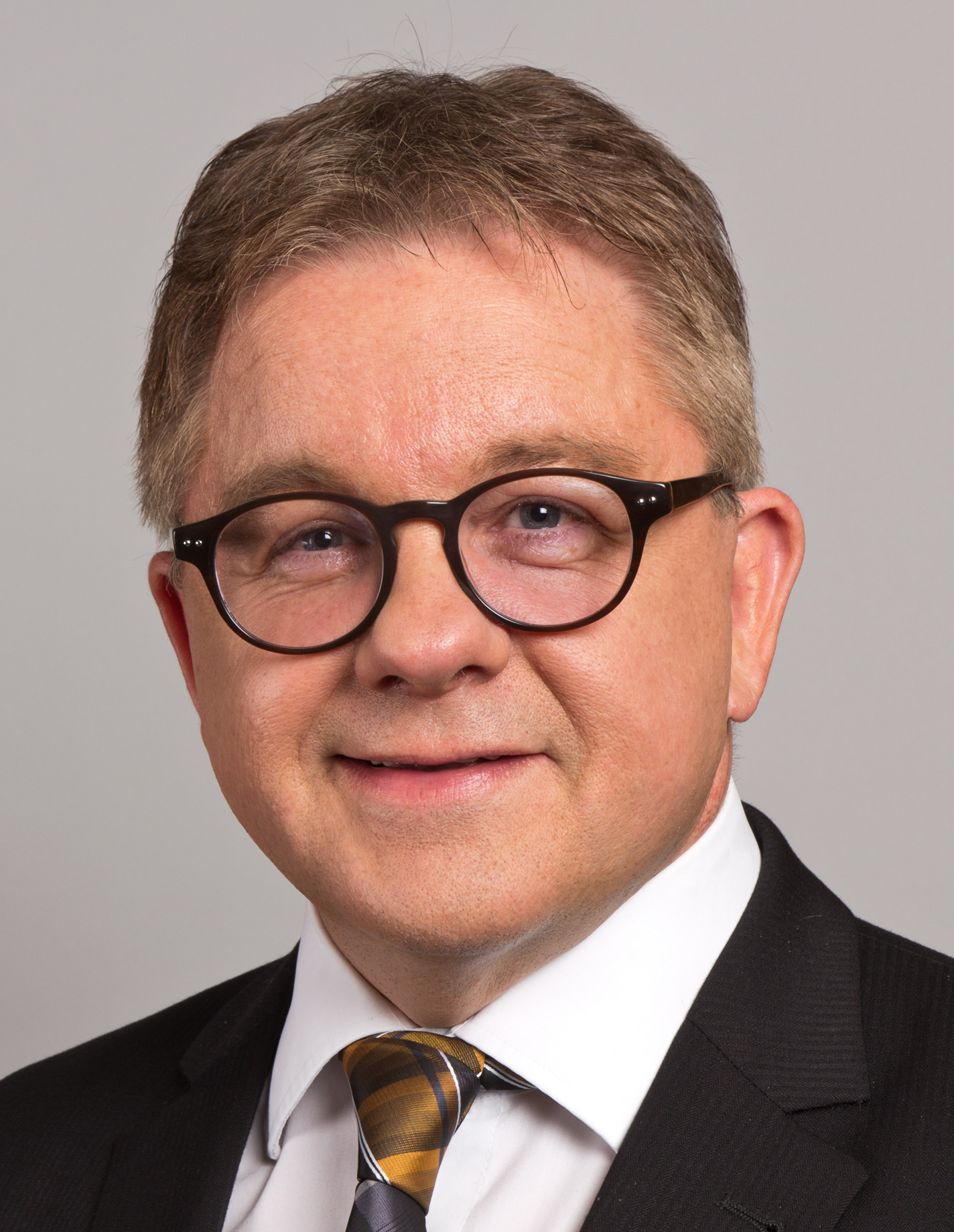
- Wolf in 2013

State Minister of Justice and Europe
- Incumbent
- Assumed office 12 May 2016
- Minister President: Winfried Kretschmann
- Preceded by: Rainer Stickelberger

Leader of the Christian Democratic Union in the Landtag of Baden-Württemberg
- In office 27 January 2015 – 12 May 2016
- Preceded by: Peter Hauk
- Succeeded by: Wolfgang Reinhart

President of the Landtag of Baden-Württemberg
- In office 26 October 2011 – 27 January 2015
- Preceded by: Willi Stächele
- Succeeded by: Wilfried Klenk

Member of the Landtag of Baden-Württemberg for Tuttlingen-Donaueschingen
- Incumbent
- Assumed office 26 March 2006
- Preceded by: Franz Schumacher

Personal details
- Born: 28 September 1961 (age 64) Weingarten, Württemberg, Germany
- Party: Christian Democratic Union of Germany

Guido Wolf (born 28 September 1961) is a German politician of the CDU who has been serving as a member of the State Parliament (Landtag) of Baden-Württemberg since 2006. From 2016 to 2021, he served as State Minister of Justice and European Affairs in the government of Minister-President Winfried Kretschmann of Baden-Württemberg.

Early in his career, Wolf was a county councillor (Landrat) from 2003 to 2011 in the district of Tuttlingen. In the State Parliament, he served as the assembly's president (2011–2015) and later led his party's group (2015–2016). He also led his party's campaign for the 2016 Baden-Württemberg state elections.

== Education and early career ==
Wolf was born and raised in Weingarten. After receiving his high school diploma in Ravensburg he studied law at the University of Konstanz. Upon completing his traineeship at the regional court district Ravensburg, the county councillor's office in Ravensburg and the Regierungspräsidium (Administrative Council) Tübingen, he underwent a specialization program in "Management and Finance" at Konstanz University. In 1988 he took his second state examination.

Upon completing his legal education, Wolf worked at the district office of Tuttlingen as Councillor for Public Safety, Order and Traffic until 1991. He was then employed until 1993 as a personal assistant and office manager for Baden-Württemberg's Transport Minister Thomas Schäuble. During the following two years he served as a judge at the administrative court in Sigmaringen. From 1994 until October 1996 he worked as a Head of Unit in the policy department of the Baden-Württemberg State Ministry.

== Political career ==
In November 1996 Wolf was elected mayor of Nürtingen. In 2003 he was elected county councillor in the district of Tuttlingen. Three years later he was elected to the Landtag of Baden-Württemberg in 2006 and re-elected 2011. In the same year he was also chosen to be president of the Landtag. In December 2014 he succeeded Peter Hauk as faction leader of the CDU in the Landtag and was elected in January 2015. At the same time, the CDU's state party convention nominated him as its leading candidate for the 2016 Baden-Württemberg state elections.

During his campaign Wolf demanded daily refugee quotas and border centers for migrants in a joint statement with CDU Rhineland-Palatinate's frontrunner Julia Klöckner in February 2016. According to their proposal, no one should be allowed to enter Germany without a reason for asylum or a protection status. Thereby, the statement increased pressure on Angela Merkel in the European migrant crisis. Eventually, the German government rejected the proposal.

On 15 March 2016, after the CDU's historic defeat in the state election, Wolf was re-elected as leader of the parliamentary group, even though his party only garnered 27 percent of the popular vote. This was criticized by several CDU state politicians and county chapters, who accused Wolf of "arrogant" behavior, because he did not step down after his defeat.

In May 2016, Wolf was appointed State Minister of Justice and European Affairs in the government of Minister-President Winfried Kretschmann of Baden-Württemberg. As one of the state’s representatives at the Bundesrat, he chaired the Committee on European Affairs from 2016.

In the negotiations to form another coalition government under Kretschmann's leadership following the 2021 state elections, Wolf was a member of the working group on European and international affairs, co-chaired by Theresa Schopper and Daniel Caspary.

== Other activities ==
=== Corporate boards ===
- L-Bank, Member of the Advisory Board
- Tourismus Marketing GmbH Baden-Württemberg, Chairman of the Supervisory Board

=== Non-profits ===
- Academy of the Roman Catholic Diocese of Rottenburg-Stuttgart, Member of the Board of Trustees
- Baden-Württemberg Stiftung, Member of the Board of Trustees
- Theater Lindenhof, Member of the Board of Trustees
