= Erwin Teufel =

German politician (born 1939)

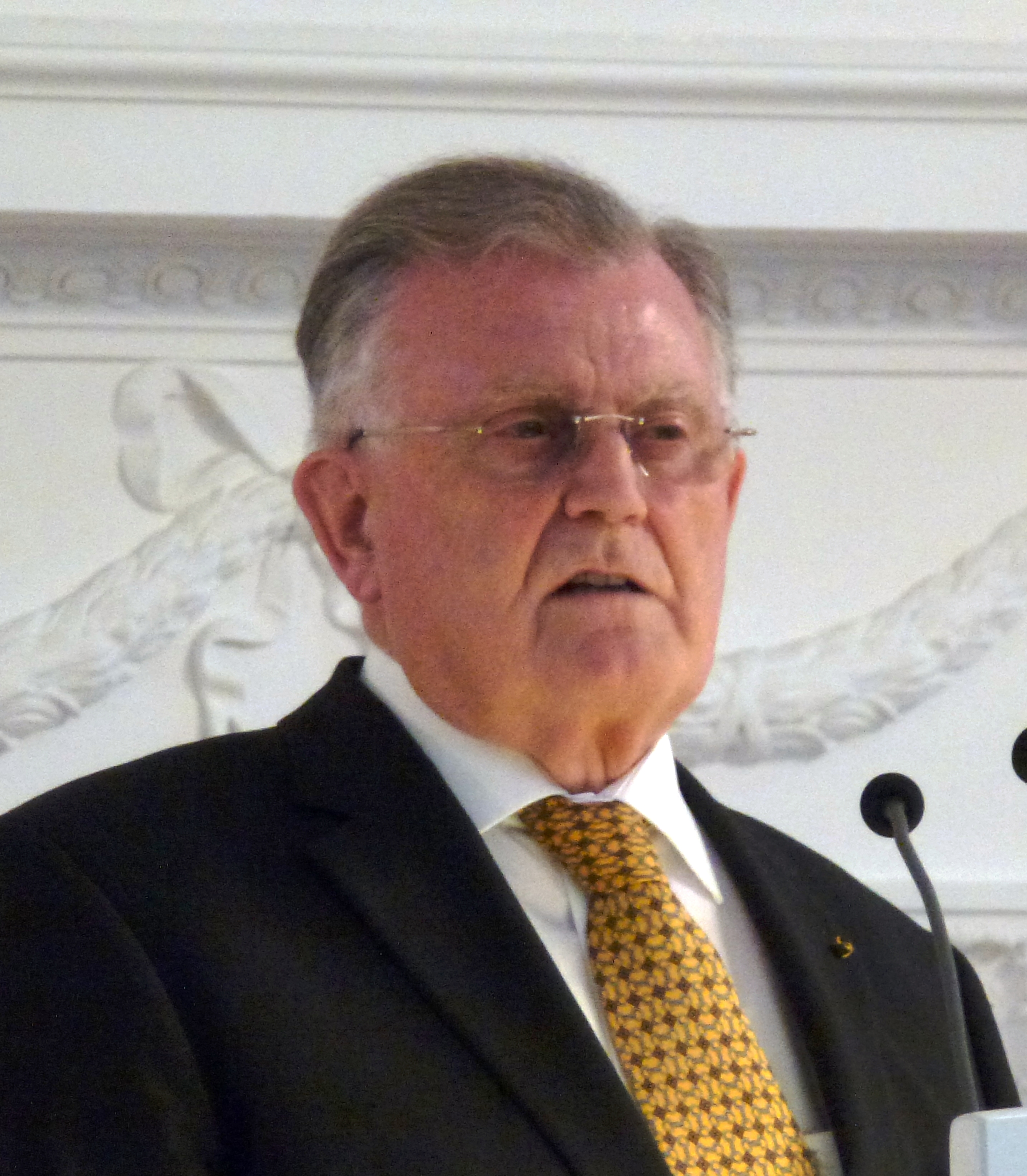
- Teufel in 2011

Minister-President of Baden-Württemberg
- In office 22 January 1991 – 21 April 2005
- Preceded by: Lothar Späth
- Succeeded by: Günther Oettinger

Chairman of the CDU Baden-Württemberg
- In office 1991 – 29 April 2005
- Preceded by: Lothar Späth
- Succeeded by: Günther Oettinger

President of the Bundesrat
- In office 1 November 1996 – 31 October 1997
- Preceded by: Edmund Stoiber
- Succeeded by: Gerhard Schröder

Personal details
- Born: 4 September 1939 (age 87) Zimmern ob Rottweil, Nazi Germany
- Party: Christian Democratic Union
- Spouse: Edeltraud Schuchter (m. 1962; died 2020)
- Children: 4
- Relatives: Stefan Teufel (nephew)

Erwin Teufel (born 4 September 1939 in Zimmern ob Rottweil) is a German politician of the CDU.

== Political career ==
Teufel was the leader of the CDU parliamentary group in the Landtag of Baden-Württemberg from 1978 to 1991.

Teufel was Minister President of Baden-Württemberg and chairman of the CDU state party group from 1991 to 2005, serving as President of the Bundesrat in 1996/97.

During his time in office, Teufel agreed with President Boris Yeltsin on a series of economic and technical cooperation agreements with Russia, including a high-level joint commission to oversee several institutes in Russia where business administrators, agronomists and scientists will be trained, and also direct a variety of exchange programs. Among other projects, Teufel oversaw the merger of two regional utilities to form EnBW in 1997 as well as the creation of regional public broadcasting corporation Südwestrundfunk (SWR) in 1998.

On the European level, Teufel represented Baden-Württemberg on the European Committee of the Regions (CoR) from 1994. Between 2002 and 2003, he also represented Germany's federal states in the Convention on the Future of Europe.

Teufel endorsed Edmund Stoiber instead of Angela Merkel as their parties' candidate to challenge incumbent Chancellor Gerhard Schröder in the 2002 federal elections.

In October 2004, Teufel announced that he was to step down as minister-president and chairman of the Baden-Württemberg CDU, effective 19 April 2005. Günther Oettinger was elected as his successor by CDU internal party pre-elections. His referendum win – with 60.6 percent of the vote versus 39.4 percent for State Education Minister Annette Schavan – was widely seen at the time as a defeat for Teufel, who had promoted Schavan as his preferred successor.

He did resign on 19 April 2005, effecting the memorable line in German short news: "Joseph Ratzinger elected Pope Benedict XVI. Teufel [German: Devil] resigned."

== Life after politics ==
=== Corporate boards ===
- Landesbank Baden-Württemberg (LBBW), member of the advisory board
- KfW, Member of the Board of Supervisory Directors (2002–2007)

=== Non-profit organizations ===
- Christliches Jugenddorfwerk Deutschlands (CJD), honorary member of the board of trustees
- Christival, member of the board of trustees
- donum vitae, member of the board of trustees (since 2001)
- International Hugo Wolf Academy, deputy chairman of the board of trustees
- Karl Schlecht Foundation, member of the board of trustees
- Konrad Adenauer Foundation (KAS), member of the board of trustees
- Lindau Nobel Laureate Meetings, Member of the Honorary Senate
- Research Center for International and Interdisciplinary Theology (FIIT) at the Heidelberg University, member of the advisory board
- University of Freiburg, member of the advisory board
- University of Tübingen, honorary senator
- Franco-German Institute, president
- Documentation and Cultural Centre of German Sinti and Roma, member of the board of trustees
- German Ethics Council, member (2008–2012)
- Jerusalem Foundation Germany, president (1993–2006)
- Central Committee of German Catholics (ZdK), member (1983–2008)

Teufel is an honorary member of A.V. Cheruskia Tübingen, a Catholic student fraternity which is a member of the Cartellverband.

== Personal life ==
Teufel is married with Edeltraud and has four children.

== Publications ==
- Maß & Mitte – Mut zu einfachen Wahrheiten, Johannis-Verlag Lahr 2006, ISBN 3-501-05181-6.
- Ehe alles zu spät ist: Kirchliche Verzagtheit und christliche Sprengkraft, Herder Verlag, Freiburg u.a. 2013, ISBN 978-3-451-30907-6.

Political offices
Preceded by Lothar Späth	Minister President of Baden-Württemberg; 1991–2005	Succeeded by Günther Oettinger
