= Stefan Mappus =

Former German politician

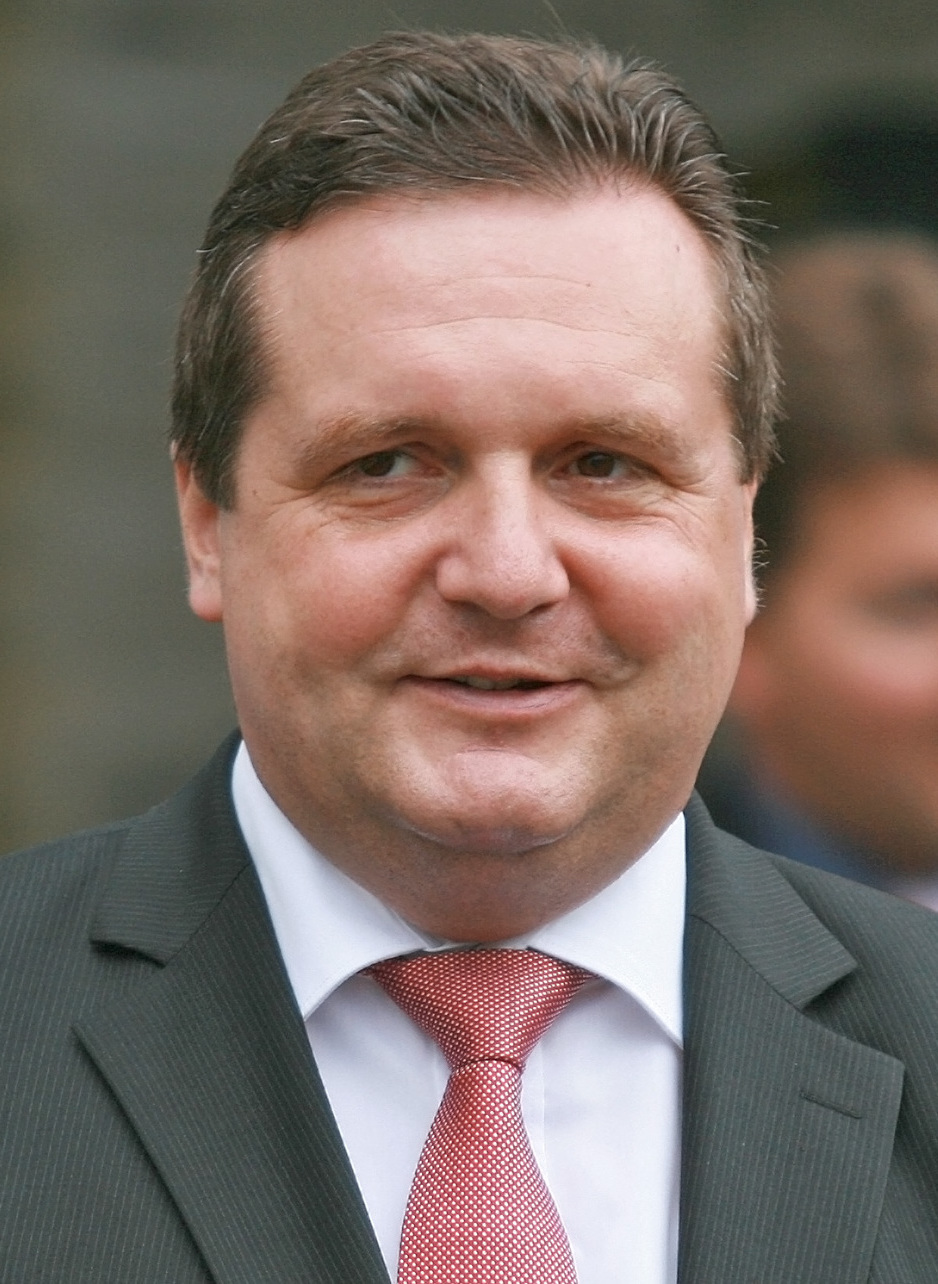
- Mappus in 2010

Minister-President of Baden-Württemberg
- In office 10 February 2010 – 12 May 2011
- President: Horst Köhler; Christian Wulff
- Chancellor: Angela Merkel
- Preceded by: Günther Oettinger
- Succeeded by: Winfried Kretschmann

Chairman of the CDU Baden-Württemberg
- In office 20 November 2009 – 30 March 2011
- Preceded by: Günther Oettinger

Personal details
- Born: 4 April 1966 (age 60) Pforzheim, Baden-Württemberg, West Germany
- Party: CDU
- Spouse: Susanne Verweyen-Mappus (m. 2001)
- Education: University of Hohenheim

Stefan Mappus (born 4 April 1966) is a German politician from the Christian Democratic Union (CDU). He was the 8th Minister President of the state of Baden-Württemberg from 2010 to 2011 and chairman of the CDU Baden-Württemberg from 2009 to 2011.

With the March 2011 Baden-Württemberg state election coming up, incumbent Minister President Günther Oettinger in late 2009 was, according to a wiki-leaked diplomatic cable from the United States Embassy in Berlin, "kicked upstairs by CDU leader and Chancellor Angela Merkel as New EU Energy Commissioner in Brussels due to being an unloved lame duck at an important CDU bastion." Mappus took over in February, and by summer polls indicated that his CDU-FDP coalition might lose against a Green-SPD coalition. His tough stance for the major Stuttgart 21 railway reconstruction project, symbolised by bloody eye injuries to an elder activist, Dietrich Wagner, did not help. The Greens won the election, and Mappus announced his resignation of the party chair.

Currently, he is a Member of the Board of Advisors of the Global Panel Foundation.

== EnBW affair ==
The public prosecutor's office in Stuttgart opened an investigation on 11 July 2012 against prime minister Stefan Mappus, several other ministers and Dirk Notheis, former head of Morgan Stanley Germany, in connection with the state's controversial purchase of a stake in utility Energie Baden-Wuerttemberg. Morgan Stanley's German operations, headed by Notheis, in 2010 advised Baden-Württemberg on the purchase of a roughly 45% stake in EnBW from French state-controlled utility Électricité de France for nearly 4.7 billion euros (about $5.77 billion) valuing the asset at a multiple of 6x operating profits. Also advising was Stuttgart law firm Gleiss Lutz. The transaction was signed four weeks after a decision by the German federal parliament to extend the maturities of existing nuclear power plants for another ten years on top of their existing license. Four months after the transaction, on 15 March 2011, the accident in a nuclear power plant in Fukushima/Japan happened, resulting in the decision by the Federal government to phase out nuclear generation, which adversely affected EnBW and its value. In addition to several fairness opinions as to the valuation of EnBW provided to the stakeholders at the time of the transaction, in total seven reviews over the EnBW share valuation were conducted over the process of the investigation. The dominating majority of reviews came to the conclusion that the price paid for the EnBW shares was fair. A review conducted by Professor Wolfgang Ballwieser deviated from the valuation consensus, however fell into great controversy after a material miscalculation of approximately €1b was discovered in Ballwieser's valuation.

The investigation was withdrawn by the State Attorney in October 2014 without any obligations at all to Mappus and the other individuals. Stefan Mappus and all others were cleared and informed in letters addressed to their respective lawyers dated 29 October 2014, in which they were also granted the right to make claims for damages.

== Personal life ==
Mappus is a Protestant and comes from a shoemaker-family in Mühlacker-Enzberg. Since 2001 he is married to in Kleve born Susanne Verweyen-Mappus, they have two sons and live in Pforzheim.

Political offices
Preceded by Günther Oettinger	Minister-President of Baden-Württemberg; 2010–2011	Succeeded by Winfried Kretschmann
