= Günther Oettinger =

German lawyer and politician (born 1953)

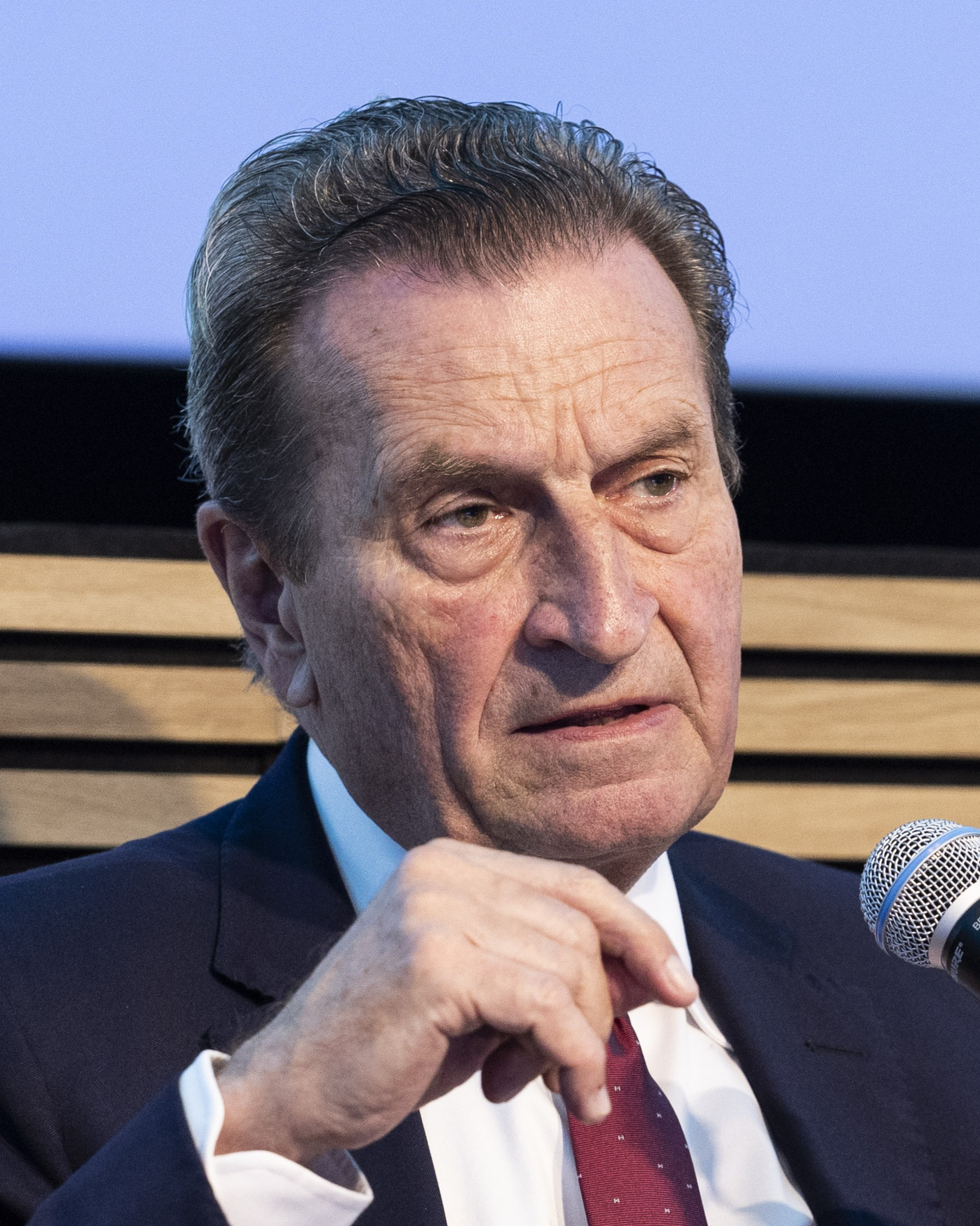
- Oettinger in 2026

European Commissioner for Budget and Human Resources
- In office 1 January 2017 – 30 November 2019
- Commission: Juncker
- Preceded by: Kristalina Georgieva
- Succeeded by: Johannes Hahn (Budget and Administration)

European Commissioner for Digital Economy and Society
- In office 1 November 2014 – 1 January 2017
- Commission: Juncker
- Preceded by: Neelie Kroes
- Succeeded by: Mariya Gabriel

European Commissioner for Energy
- In office 9 February 2010 – 1 November 2014
- Commission: Barroso II
- Preceded by: Andris Piebalgs
- Succeeded by: Miguel Arias Cañete (Climate Action and Energy); Maroš Šefčovič (Energy Union)

Minister President of Baden-Württemberg
- In office 21 April 2005 – 9 February 2010
- President: Horst Köhler
- Chancellor: Gerhard Schröder; Angela Merkel
- Preceded by: Erwin Teufel
- Succeeded by: Stefan Mappus

Leader of the Christian Democratic Union in Baden-Württemberg
- In office 29 April 2005 – 20 November 2009
- Preceded by: Erwin Teufel
- Succeeded by: Stefan Mappus

Personal details
- Born: Günther Hermann Oettinger; 15 October 1953 (age 73) Stuttgart, Baden-Württemberg, West Germany (now Germany)
- Party: Christian Democratic Union
- Spouse: Inken Stange (1994–2007)
- Children: 1
- Education: University of Tübingen
- Website: Official website

Günther Hermann Oettinger (born 15 October 1953) is a German lawyer and politician of the Christian Democratic Union (CDU) who served as European Commissioner for Budget and Human Resources from 2017 to 2019, as European Commissioner for Digital Economy and Society from 2014 to 2016 and as European Commissioner for Energy from 2010 to 2014.

He is affiliated with the liberal-conservative European People's Party (EPP). He served as Minister-President of Baden-Württemberg between 2005 and 2010 and as chairman of the CDU Baden-Württemberg from 2005 until 2010.

Since 2021, Oettinger has served as president of the German private university EBS Universität für Wirtschaft und Recht in Wiesbaden.

== Early life and education ==
Oettinger was born to Hermann Oettinger in Stuttgart, who owned a tax accounting and enterprise consulting business. He grew up in Ditzingen, and attended school at Gymnasium Korntal-Münchingen.

He studied law and Economics at the University of Tübingen. He worked in an accounting and tax consulting business, before being licensed in 1984 to practice law and worked in this sector until 1988.

== Political career ==
=== Career in national politics ===
Oettinger embarked in politics as a member of the Junge Union, the youth organisation of the CDU; he was chairman of the organization in Baden-Württemberg from 1983 to 1989. From 2001 to 2005 he served as Chairman of the CDU Party in Nordwürttemberg (North Württemberg), and has also been CDU Chairman of the Federal Committee for Media Politics.

Oettinger was elected as a Member of the State Parliament (Landtag) of Baden-Württemberg in 1984. From 1991 to 2005 he was Leader of the CDU Parliamentary Group.

=== Minister President of Baden-Württemberg, 2004–10 ===
In October 2004 the Minister President of Baden-Württemberg Erwin Teufel announced that he was to step down as Minister President and Chairman of the Baden-Württemberg CDU, effective 19 April 2005. Oettinger was elected as his successor by CDU internal party pre-elections. His referendum win – with 60.6 percent of the vote versus 39.4 percent for state Education Minister Annette Schavan – was widely seen at the time as a defeat for Teufel, who had promoted Schavan as his preferred successor.

On 29 April 2005, Oettinger became Chairman of the CDU in Baden-Württemberg, eight days after succeeding Teufel as Minister President. In 2006 the CDU held onto their majority in the Baden-Württemberg state election; Oettinger was re-elected Minister President. Oettinger headed a coalition regional government comprising CDU and FDP members.

Oettinger was a CDU delegate to the Federal Convention for the purpose of electing the President of Germany in 2004 and 2009. Between 2007 and 2009, he served as co-chair (alongside Peter Struck) of the Second Commission on the modernization of the federal state (Föderalismuskommission II), which had been established to reform the division of powers between federal and state authorities in Germany.

Following the 2009 federal elections, Oettinger was part of the CDU/CSU team in the negotiations with the FDP on a coalition agreement; he joined the working group on economic affairs and energy policy, led by Karl-Theodor zu Guttenberg and Rainer Brüderle. On 24 October 2009, Angela Merkel's new centre-right coalition government chose Oettinger to be a Commissioner of the European Commission. He took office on 10 February 2010, the same day he stepped down as Minister President of Baden-Württemberg, with the March 2011 Baden-Württemberg state election coming up.

In a wiki-leaked diplomatic cable from the United States Embassy entitled "Lame Duck German Governor Kicked Upstairs as New Energy Commissioner in Brussels," U.S. Deputy Chief of Mission in Germany, Greg Delawie notes: "Chancellor Angela Merkel nominated Baden-Wuerttemberg (BW) Minister President Guenther Oettinger as EU Energy Commissioner primarily to remove an unloved lame duck from an important CDU bastion". Delawie's cable further states: "Oettinger is noted for a lackluster public speaking-style, and some commentators have asserted that Merkel, who has often stood out at EU meetings, wanted to appoint a German Commissioner who would not outshine her!"

=== Vice-President of the European Commission in charge of Energy, 2010–14 ===
In the Second Barroso Commission, Oettinger was allocated the Energy portfolio, which had just grown in importance after the Lisbon Treaty gave the EU complete authority in the area.

At his confirmation hearing before the European Parliament in 2010, Oettinger pledged to enforce the principle of solidarity on energy policy as enshrined in the EU's Lisbon Treaty so that no member state could be left disadvantaged. He struck a chord with parliamentarians by basing his security of supply strategy equally on diversifying gas transportation routes from third countries and promoting indigenous renewable energy. Asked about his stance on nuclear energy Oettinger said that although his country Germany sees nuclear as a bridging technology, he had no reservations against France's plans to build more nuclear capacity nor Austria's decision to abandon the technology altogether.

The first phase of Oettinger's term was dominated by the Nabucco pipeline debate, his many trips to Azerbaijan and the Caspian region as well as his negotiations with Russian energy company Gazprom. Oettinger lobbied both for the Nabucco pipeline and the Trans Adriatic Pipeline, arguing they will be needed in the medium-term as routes to help secure European gas supply. The second phase began with the Fukushima Daiichi nuclear disaster in 2011 and the resulting energy transition in Germany. Oettinger advised that there should be no new taxes on energy within the EU, and current taxes should not be raised, if prices are to be kept competitive with rivals fuelled by cheaper shale gas in the US.

Throughout his time in office, Oettinger regularly made headlines for his comments on constituent EU member countries' economic situations. In remarks published by German media in May 2013, he expressed doubts about France's economic recovery and said "too many in Europe still believe that everything will be fine." France, he said, "is completely unprepared to do what's necessary," while Italy, Bulgaria and Romania "are essentially ungovernable." Oettinger has also repeatedly been in conflict with the German government. In an interview with Die Welt in 2014, he criticized the German Federal Government's plan to allow longer-serving employees to retire at the age of 63 for the message this sent to cash-strapped peripheral eurozone states like Greece, Spain and Portugal.

In mid-2014, Oettinger led high-level talks in order to facilitate a deal under which Ukraine would pay Russia $3.1 billion amid a dispute over unpaid Russian gas bills and Russia would deliver the gas Ukraine needs for the winter.

=== Commissioner for Digital Economy and Society, 2014–16 ===
Following the 2014 European elections, both governing parties in Germany – the Christian Democratic Union (CDU) and the Social Democratic Party (SPD) – backed Oettinger to remain as the German EU Commissioner in the incoming European Commission. At first, Oettinger was widely considered to be a leading candidate to take the position of European Commissioner for Trade, as German Chancellor Angela Merkel was said to consider the negotiations over the controversial TTIP to be one of the most important projects for growth in this legislative term. Instead, Jean-Claude Juncker, President-elect of the European Commission, nominated Oettinger as Commissioner for Digital Economy and Society.

In this capacity, Oettinger was in charge of the Commission's department for communications networks, content and technology. His department gained considerable powers as part of Juncker's administrative reshuffle, including over the fight against counterfeiting, piracy and copyright. He shared competency over cyber-security matters with Dimitris Avramopoulos.

Data protection

In a nod to European concerns over data protection, Oettinger expressed his support for stiffer rules currently under consideration that would provide Europeans with a greater say over how their online data is used by the likes of Google, Facebook and other internet companies. He also supported the legal principle known as the "right to be forgotten", in which people have the right to ask that search engines no longer produce certain irrelevant or out-of-date information, when a search is done on the basis of the person's name internet searches. Pushing for a credible global common understanding on confidential and personal information of citizens around the world, Oettinger called for the establishment of a UN agency for data protection and data security.

Economic policy

In an op-ed published in both the Financial Times and Les Échos in November 2014, Oettinger questioned whether President François Hollande had the "willingness to act" to reform the French economy and said the Commission should insist France undertake "concrete and quantifiable measures coupled with precise deadlines" as a condition for a fresh deficit extension; in response, members of the French Socialists called for Oettinger to resign.

=== Commissioner for Budget and Human Resources, 2017–19 ===
On 1 January 2017 Oettinger was reassigned to the Budget and Human Resources portfolio, following the resignation of Kristalina Georgieva with effect from 31 December 2016 to take up a new position as chief executive officer of the World Bank.

== Career after EU retirement ==
In 2019, Oettinger and his partner Friederike Beyer jointly set up Oettinger Consulting, a Hamburg-based advisory firm. In 2020, he became a consultant to Viktor Orban.

Since 2021, Oettinger has been serving as the president of EBS University of Business and Law.

== Controversies ==
=== Eulogy controversy ===
On 11 April 2007, Oettinger gave a controversial eulogy on one of his predecessors as Minister President of Baden-Württemberg, Hans Filbinger who had been forced to resign in 1978 after allegations surfaced about his role as a navy lawyer and judge during World War II. In his speech at the memorial service at Freiburg, Oettinger described Filbinger as "not a National-Socialist" but as "an opponent of the Nazi régime", who "could escape the constraints of the régime as little as millions of others". Referring to Filbinger's role as a naval judge, Oettinger pointed out that no lives were taken by Filbinger's verdicts and that he did not wield the power and freedom suggested by his critics. Oettinger was subsequently accused by politicians and the media of playing down the significance of the Nazi dictatorship. German Chancellor Angela Merkel publicly admonished him, stating that she would have preferred for "the critical questions" not to be raised. Oettinger was also criticized by opposition politicians and the Central Council of Jews in Germany; some critics even called for his dismissal.

Oettinger at first defended his speech, adding that he regretted any "misunderstanding" over his eulogy although he did not retract his comments about Filbinger's past. Five days later however, he distanced himself from his comments.

=== Flag controversy ===
Oettinger suggested that heavily indebted countries should fly their flag at half-mast over EU buildings. As a result, several MEPs wrote a letter of protest to EU Commission President José Manuel Barroso, demanding his apology or resignation. Oettinger backed down, saying he did not support the idea of flying flags at half-mast.

=== Remarks on Chinese people ===
In a speech to business leaders in Hamburg on 26 October 2016, Oettinger referred to Chinese people as "slit-eyes" and "sly dogs". He also stated that it was "consistent" that a Chinese delegation was male-only since China doesn't have female quotas. Oettinger subsequently received criticism both from European sources and a Chinese government spokesman, and several days later issued a statement apologizing for "any remark that was not as respectful as it should have been".

=== Intervention in Italian politics ===
On 29 May 2018, commenting in an interview with Deutsche Welle on developments in Italy after the 2018 General Election, Oettinger said "Even now, developments on bond markets, the market value of banks, and Italy's economy in general have darkened noticeably and negatively. That has to do with the possible government formation. I can only hope that this will play a role in the election campaign and send a signal not to hand populists on the right and left any responsibility in government."

European Council President Donald Tusk and European Commission President Jean-Claude Juncker immediately distanced themselves from these remarks and Oettinger apologised, explaining "I fully respect the will of voters being left, right or centre and in every country. By referring to actual market developments in Italy, I did not mean to be disrespectful."

== Other activities ==
=== Corporate boards ===
- Gröner Group, Member of the Advisory Board (since 2022)
- Donner & Reuschel, Chair of the Adivsory Board (since 2021)
- HAM-LOG Gruppe, Member of the Advisory Board (since 2021)
- Herrenknecht, Member of the Supervisory Board (since 2021)
- Kekst CNC, Member of the Global Advisory Board (since 2020)
- Deloitte Deutschland, Member of the Advisory Council (since 2020)
- Amundi Deutschland, Member of the Supervisory Board (since 2020)
- CG Elementum, Member of the Supervisory Board (since 2020)

=== Non-profit organizations ===
- European Partnership for an Innovative Campus Unifying Regions (EPICUR), Member of the Advisory Board (since 2021)
- German Council on Foreign Relations (DGAP), Member of the Presidium (since 2020)
- Friends of the Dessau-Wörlitz Garden Realm, Member of the Board of Trustees
- Initiative D21, Member of the Advisory Board
- Schule Schloss Salem, Member of the Board of Trustees (since 2010)
- Medien- und Filmgesellschaft Baden-Württemberg (MFG), Member of the Supervisory Board (−2005)

== Personal life ==
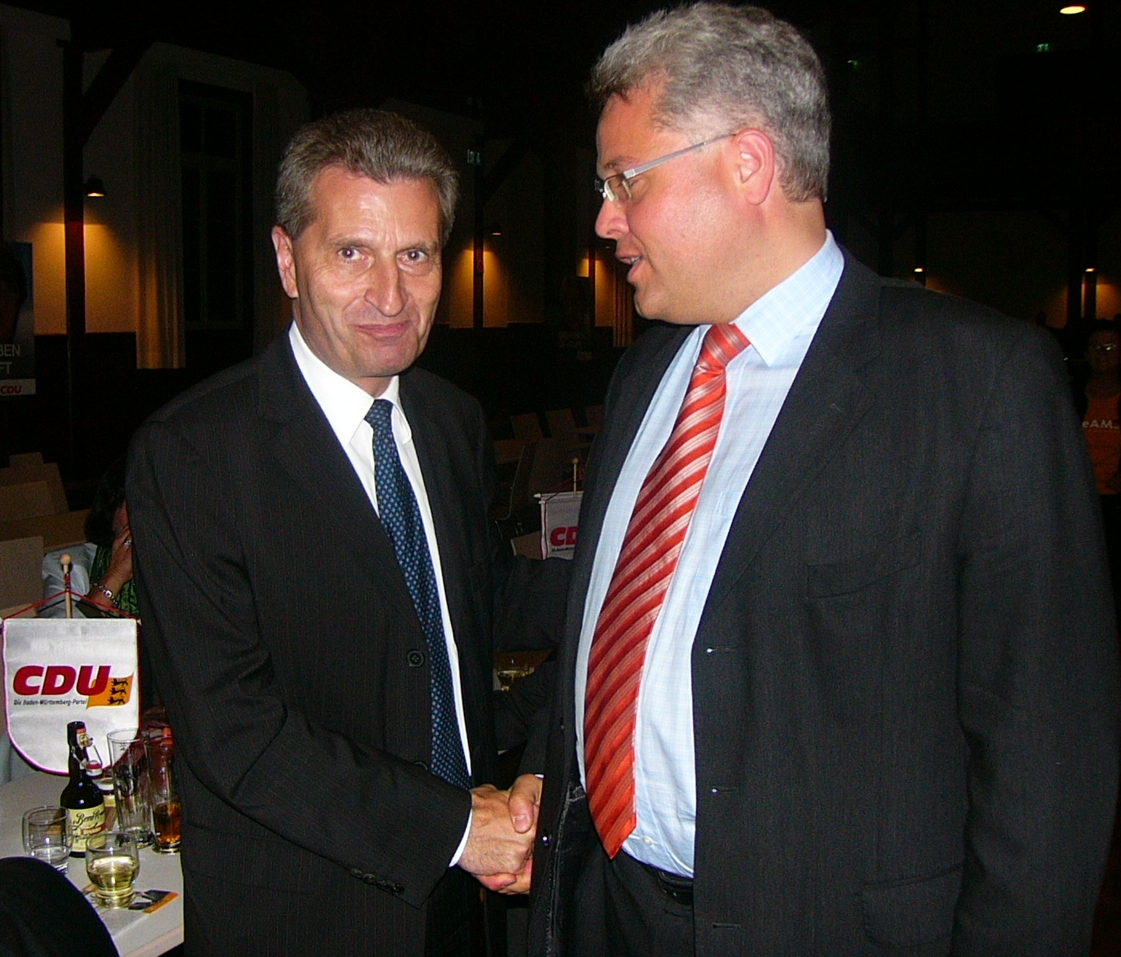
Oettinger with Cai-Ullrich Fark Warthausen's former Mayor at a CDU rally in Biberach-Riss, September 2009

Oettinger married Inken Stange in 1994, by whom he has one son. On 9 December 2007, Oettinger and Inken announced that they were separated. Three days later, Oettinger's wife was reported to have already been in a relationship for nine months with Otmar Westerfellhaus, Managing Director of the Porsche car-manufacturing subsidiary in Mannheim.

In 2008, after separating from his wife, Oettinger's liaison with Friederike Beyer, a PR events organiser from Hamburg, who is 25 years his junior, enjoyed wide coverage in the German press. Since 2010, the couple has been residing in Brussels.

== Honours ==
- Grand Cross (1st Class), Order of Merit of the Federal Republic of Germany (2004)
- Grand Cross, Order for Merits to Lithuania (2013)
- Medal for Extraordinary Merits for Bavaria in a United Europe (2015)
- Medal "Wuerttemberger Koepfe" for his European engagement (2019)

Political offices
Preceded by Erwin Teufel	Minister-President of Baden-Württemberg; 2005–2010	Succeeded by Stefan Mappus
Preceded by Günter Verheugen	German European Commissioner; 2010–2019	Succeeded by Ursula von der Leyen
Preceded by Andris Piebalgs	European Commissioner for Energy; 2010–2014	Succeeded by Miguel Arias Cañete as European Commissioner for Climate Action and Energy
Preceded by Andris Piebalgs	European Commissioner for Energy; 2010–2014	Succeeded by Maroš Šefčovič as European Commissioner for Energy Union
Preceded by Neelie Kroes as European Commissioner for Digital Agenda	European Commissioner for Digital Economy and Society; 2014–2017	Succeeded by Andrus Ansip; Acting
Preceded by Kristalina Georgieva	European Commissioner for the Budget and Human Resources; 2017–2019	Succeeded by Johannes Hahn as European Commissioner for Budget and Administration
