= Hans cabinet =

State government of Saarland

Cabinet of Tobbias Hans Cabinet Hans
- 28th Cabinet of Saarland
- 1 March 2018 – 24 April 2022
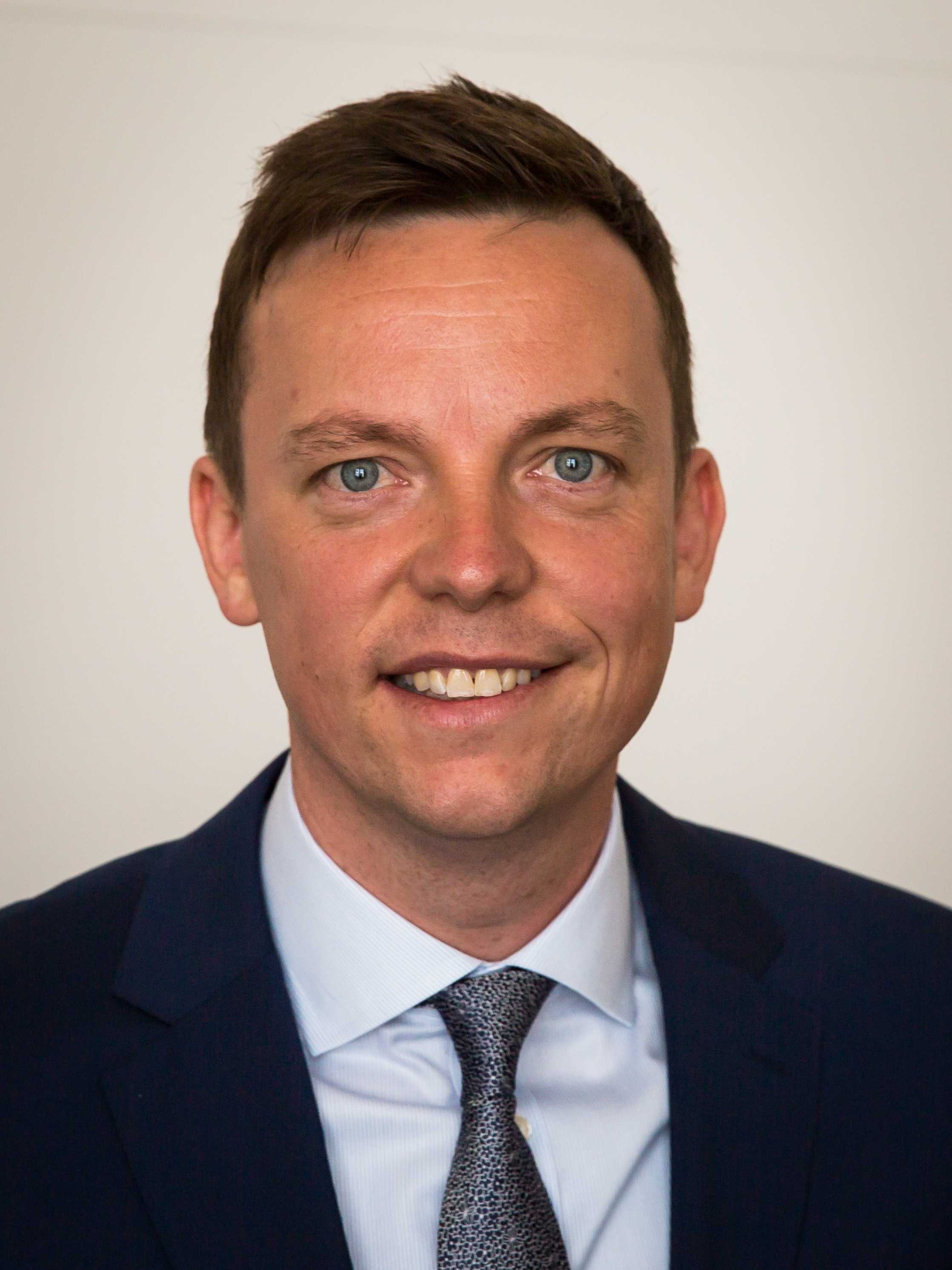
- Tobias Hans in June 2017
- Date formed: 1 March 2018
- Date dissolved: 24 April 2022

People and organisations
- Minister-President: Tobias Hans
- Deputy Minister-President: Anke Rehlinger
- No. of ministers: 6
- Member parties: Christian Democratic Union; Social Democratic Party
- Status in legislature: Grand coalition (Majority)
- Opposition parties: The Left; Alternative for Germany

History
- Election: None
- Legislature term: 16th Landtag of Saarland
- Predecessor: Third Kramp-Karrenbauer cabinet
- Successor: Rehlinger cabinet

The Hans cabinet was the state government of Saarland between 2018 and 2022, sworn in on 1 March 2018 after Tobias Hans was elected as Minister-President of Saarland by the members of the Landtag of Saarland. It was the 28th Cabinet of Saarland.

It was formed after the resignation of Minister-President Annegret Kramp-Karrenbauer, and was a continuation of the grand coalition government of the Christian Democratic Union (CDU) and Social Democratic Party (SPD) formed after the 2017 Saarland state election. Excluding the Minister-President, the cabinet comprised six ministers. Three were members of the CDU and three were members of the SPD.

The Hans cabinet was succeeded by the Rehlinger cabinet on 25 April 2022.

== Formation ==
The previous cabinet was a grand coalition government of the CDU and SPD led by Minister-President Annegret Kramp-Karrenbauer of the CDU. She announced her switch to federal politics after being nominated as general-secretary of the federal CDU in February 2018. The same day, CDU parliamentary leader Tobias Hans was nominated as her successor. Kramp-Karrenbauer formally resigned as Minister-President two days later.

Hans was elected as Minister-President by the Landtag on 1 March, winning 40 votes out of 51 cast.

== Composition ==
Portfolio	Minister	Party	Took office	Left office	State secretaries
Minister-President; State Chancellery	Tobias Hans born 1 February 1978 (age 48)	CDU	1 March 2018	24 April 2022	Henrik Eitel (Head of the State Chancellery, Representative to the Federal Government)
Deputy Minister-President Minister for Economics, Labour, Energy and Transport	Anke Rehlinger born 6 April 1976 (age 50)	SPD	1 March 2018	24 April 2022	Jürgen Barke
Minister for Finance and Europe; Minister for Justice	Peter Strobel born 28 August 1970 (age 56)	CDU	1 March 2018	24 April 2022	Anja Wagner-Scheid (Finance); Roland Theis (Justice and Europe, Representative for European Affairs)
Minister for Interior, Construction and Sport	Klaus Bouillon born 19 November 1947 (age 78)	CDU	1 March 2018	24 April 2022	Christian Seel
Minister for Social Affairs, Health, Women and Family	Monika Bachmann born 24 February 1950 (age 76)	CDU	1 March 2018	24 April 2022	Stephan Kolling
Minister for Education and Culture	Ulrich Commerçon born 28 April 1968 (age 58)	SPD	1 March 2018	18 September 2019	Christine Streichert-Clivot
Minister for Education and Culture	Christine Streichert-Clivot born 28 April 1980 (age 46)	SPD	18 September 2019	24 April 2022	Jan Benedyczuk
Minister for Environment and Consumer Protection	Reinhold Jost born 4 June 1966 (age 60)	SPD	1 March 2018	24 April 2022	Sebastian Thul
