= Third Kramp-Karrenbauer cabinet =

Third Cabinet of Annegret Kramp-Karrenbauer Kramp-Karrenbauer III
- 27th Cabinet of Saarland
- 17 May 2017 – 28 February 2018
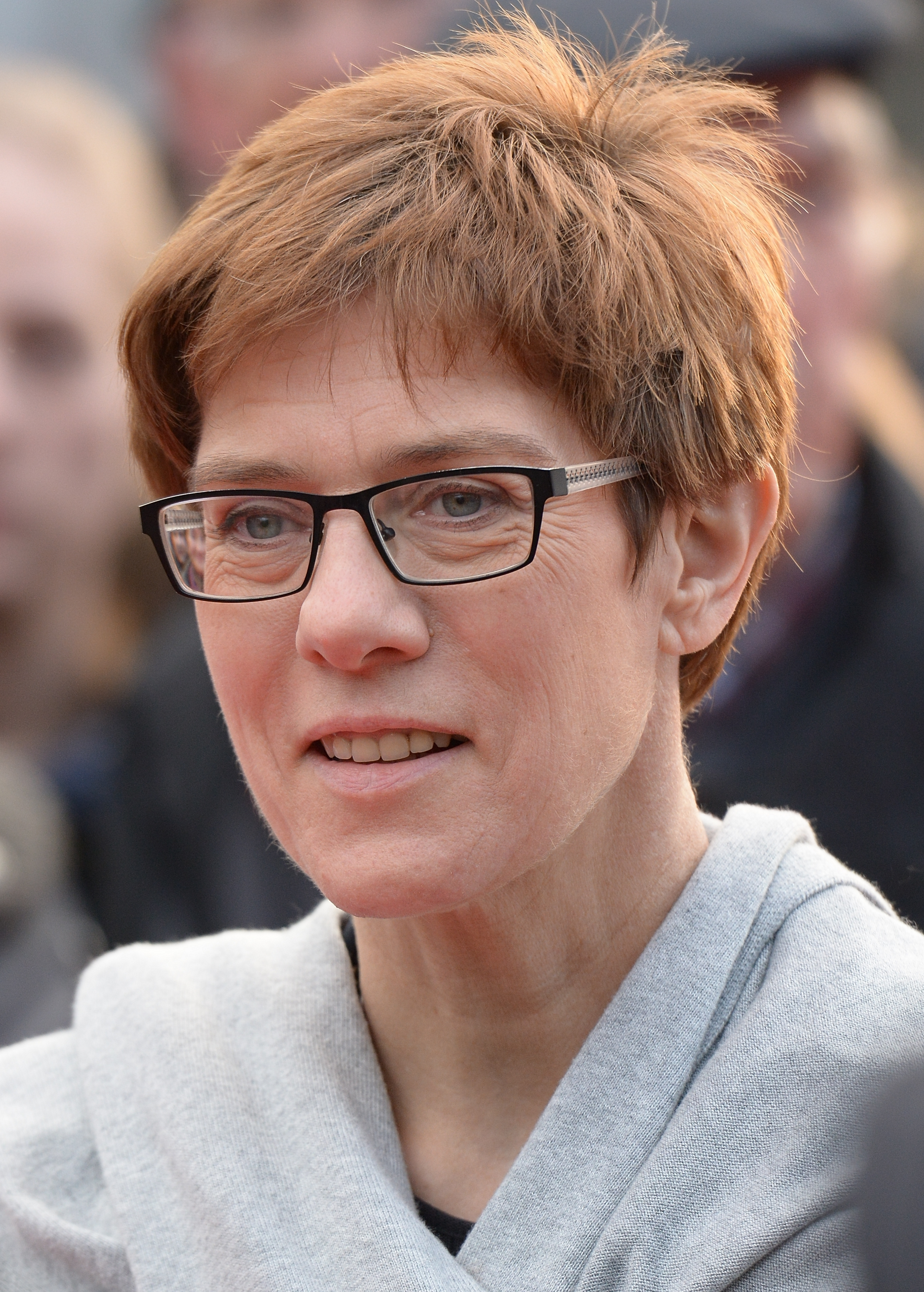
- Annegret Kramp-Karrenbauer in April 2016
- Date formed: 17 May 2017
- Date dissolved: 28 February 2018

People and organisations
- Minister-President: Annegret Kramp-Karrenbauer
- Deputy Minister-President: Anke Rehlinger
- No. of ministers: 6
- Member parties: Christian Democratic Union; Social Democratic Party
- Status in legislature: Grand coalition (Majority)
- Opposition parties: The Left; Alternative for Germany

History
- Election: None
- Legislature term: 16th Landtag of Saarland
- Predecessor: Second Kramp-Karrenbauer cabinet
- Successor: Hans cabinet

The Third Kramp-Karrenbauer cabinet was the state government of Saarland between 2017 and 2018, sworn in on 17 May 2017 after Annegret Kramp-Karrenbauer was elected as Minister-President of Saarland by the members of the Landtag of Saarland. It was the 27th Cabinet of Saarland.

It was formed after the 2017 Saarland state election by the Christian Democratic Union (CDU) and Social Democratic Party (SPD). Excluding the Minister-President, the cabinet comprised six ministers. Three were members of the CDU and three were members of the SPD.

After Kramp-Karrenbauer's resignation as Minister-President, the third Kramp-Karrenbauer cabinet was succeeded by the Hans cabinet on 1 March 2018.

== Formation ==
The previous cabinet was a grand coalition government of the CDU and SPD led by Minister-President Annegret Kramp-Karrenbauer of the CDU.

The election took place on 26 March 2017, and resulted in an improvement for the CDU and slight losses for the SPD. The opposition Left party also recorded a decline, while the AfD debuted at 6%.

Overall, the incumbent coalition retained an increased majority. The CDU could also achieve a majority with either The Left or AfD, but had ruled out cooperation with either party before the election. The day after the election, the CDU and SPD agreed to begin talks to renew their coalition. Formal negotiations began on 7 April. They finalised a coalition agreement on 3 May. It subsequently received approval from both parties, with the SPD congress voting 97% in favour and the CDU unanimously.

Kramp-Karrenbauer was elected as Minister-President by the Landtag on 17 May, winning 41 votes out of 51 cast.

== Composition ==
The composition of the cabinet at the time of its dissolution was as follows:

Portfolio	Minister	Party	Took office	Left office	State secretaries
Minister-President; State Chancellery Minister for Science and Technology	Annegret Kramp-Karrenbauer born 9 August 1962	CDU	17 May 2017	28 February 2018	Jürgen Lennartz (Head of the State Chancellery, Representative to the Federal Government)
Deputy Minister-President Minister for Economics, Labour, Energy and Transport	Anke Rehlinger born 6 April 1976	SPD	17 May 2017	28 February 2018	Jürgen Barke
Minister for Finance and Europe; Minister for Justice	Stephan Toscani born 21 February 1967	CDU	17 May 2017	28 February 2018	Ulli Meyer (Finance); Roland Theis (Justice and Europe)
Minister for Interior, Construction and Sport	Klaus Bouillon born 19 November 1947	CDU	17 May 2017	28 February 2018	Christian Seel
Minister for Social Affairs, Health, Women and Family	Monika Bachmann born 24 February 1950	CDU	17 May 2017	28 February 2018	Stephan Kolling
Minister for Education and Culture	Ulrich Commerçon born 28 April 1968	SPD	17 May 2017	28 February 2018	Christine Streichert-Clivot
Minister for Environment and Consumer Protection	Reinhold Jost born 4 June 1966	SPD	17 May 2017	28 February 2018	Ronald Krämer
