= Rehlinger cabinet =

State government of Saarland

Cabinet of Anke Rehlinger Cabinet Rehlinger
- 29th Cabinet of Saarland
- 25 April 2022 –
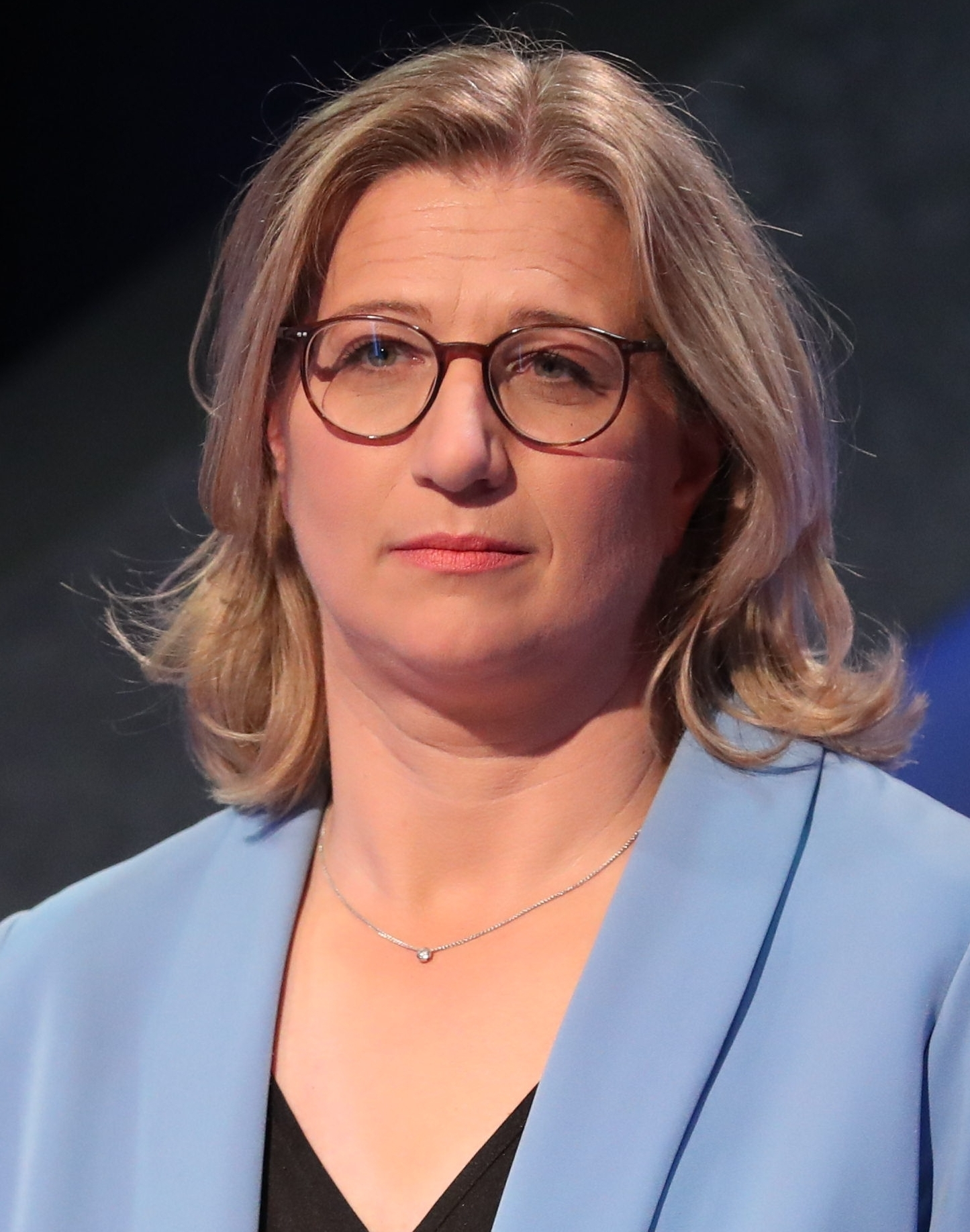
- Anke Rehlinger on the evening of the 2022 Saarland state election
- Date formed: 25 April 2022

People and organisations
- Minister-President: Anke Rehlinger
- Deputy Minister-President: Jürgen Barke
- No. of ministers: 6
- Member parties: Social Democratic Party
- Status in legislature: Majority government
- Opposition parties: Christian Democratic Union; Alternative for Germany

History
- Election: 2022 Saarland state election
- Legislature term: 17th Landtag of Saarland
- Predecessor: Hans cabinet

The Rehlinger cabinet is the current state government of Saarland, sworn in on 25 April 2022 after Anke Rehlinger was elected as Minister-President of Saarland by the members of the Landtag of Saarland. It is the 29th Cabinet of Saarland.

It was formed after the 2022 Saarland state election by the Social Democratic Party (SPD). Excluding the Minister-President, the cabinet comprises six ministers, all of whom are members of the SPD.

== Formation ==
The previous cabinet was a grand coalition government of the Christian Democratic Union (CDU) and SPD led by Minister-President Tobias Hans of the CDU.

The election took place on 27 March 2022, and resulted in a landslide victory for the SPD, who won an absolute majority of seats with 43.5% of votes. The CDU recorded severe losses and declined to second place with 28.5% and 19 seats, while The Left lost all their seats and the AfD remained steady on 6%.

Owing to the SPD's majority, Rehlinger announced that she would seek to form government alone. She presented her proposed cabinet on 21 April.

Rehlinger was elected as Minister-President by the Landtag on 25 April, winning 32 votes out of 51 cast.

== Composition ==
Portfolio	Minister	Party	Took office	Left office	State secretaries
Minister-President; State Chancellery	Anke Rehlinger born 6 April 1976 (age 50)	SPD	25 April 2022	Incumbent	David Lindemann (Head of the State Chancellery, Representative for Europe); Thorsten Bischoff (Media, Representative to the Federal Government)
Deputy Minister-President Minister for Economics, Innovation, Digital Affairs and Energy	Jürgen Barke born 26 December 1962 (age 63)	SPD	25 April 2022	Incumbent	Elena Yorgova-Ramanauskas
Minister for Finance and Science	Jakob von Weizsäcker born 4 March 1970 (age 56)	SPD	25 April 2022	Incumbent	Wolfgang Förster
Minister for Interior, Construction and Sport	Reinhold Jost born 4 June 1966 (age 60)	SPD	25 April 2022	Incumbent	Torsten Lang
Minister for Labour, Social Affairs, Women and Health	Magnus Jung born 28 October 1971 (age 55)	SPD	25 April 2022	Incumbent	Bettina Altesleben
Minister for Education and Culture	Christine Streichert-Clivot born 28 April 1980 (age 46)	SPD	25 April 2022	Incumbent	Jan Benedyczuk
Minister for Environment, Climate Protection, Mobility, Agriculture and Consumer Protection	Petra Berg born 10 July 1964 (age 62)	SPD	25 April 2022	Incumbent	Sebastian Thul
Minister for Justice	Petra Berg born 10 July 1964 (age 62)	SPD	25 April 2022	Incumbent	Jens Diener
