= Freigang =

Freigang is a surname. Notable people with the surname include:

- Jasmin Freigang (born 1989), German politician
- Laura Freigang (born 1998), German professional footballer
- Stephan Freigang (born 1967), German long-distance runner
