= Jasmin Freigang =

German politician

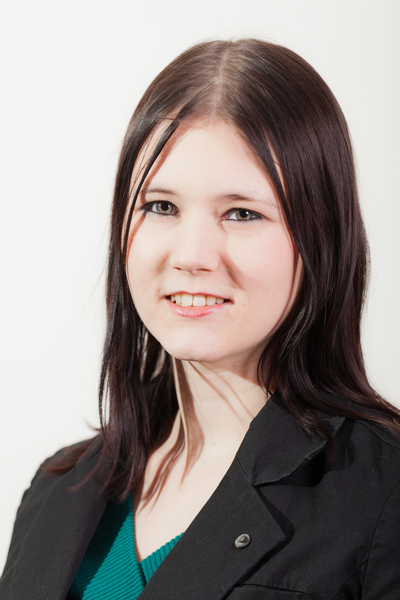
- Jasmin Freigang in 2012

Pirate Party Group Leader
- In office March 2012 – August 2012

Member of the Saarland regional parliament
- In office March 2012 – March 2017

Personal details
- Born: 29 March 1989 (age 37) Saarbrücken, Germany
- Party: Pirate Party

Jasmin Freigang (née Maurer; born 29 March 1989) is a German politician who was a member of the Saarland regional parliament from 2012 to 2017, representing the Pirate Party.

== Life and education ==
Jasmin began studying law at Saarland University after leaving school. However, she gave up her studies and took up an apprenticeship as a management assistant in IT systems. She married in 2016. In 2017 she began an apprenticeship as a policewoman after successfully fighting in court about the right to be accepted for the test, despite being apparently shorter than the required 162 cm.

== Politics ==
Jasmin supported the Pirate Party during the national elections of 2009.

She was selected as the top list candidate for the Pirate Party in the 2012 Saarland election, in which the party won 7.4% of the votes and 4 seats.

In August 2012, Jasmin lost the vote to remain party chairman in the state of Saarland to Jan Niklas Fingerle. She is now joint vice-chairman of the regional party and has responsibility in the parliamentary group for Education policy, women's issues, health policy, youth policy, child policy, cultural policy, media policy, social policy, urban planning and housing, animal welfare, environment and consumer protection policy.

Jasmin lost her seat in the Landtag of Saarland in the 2017 election, where the Pirate Party won 0.7% of the vote, losing all its seats.
