= Jürgen Barke =

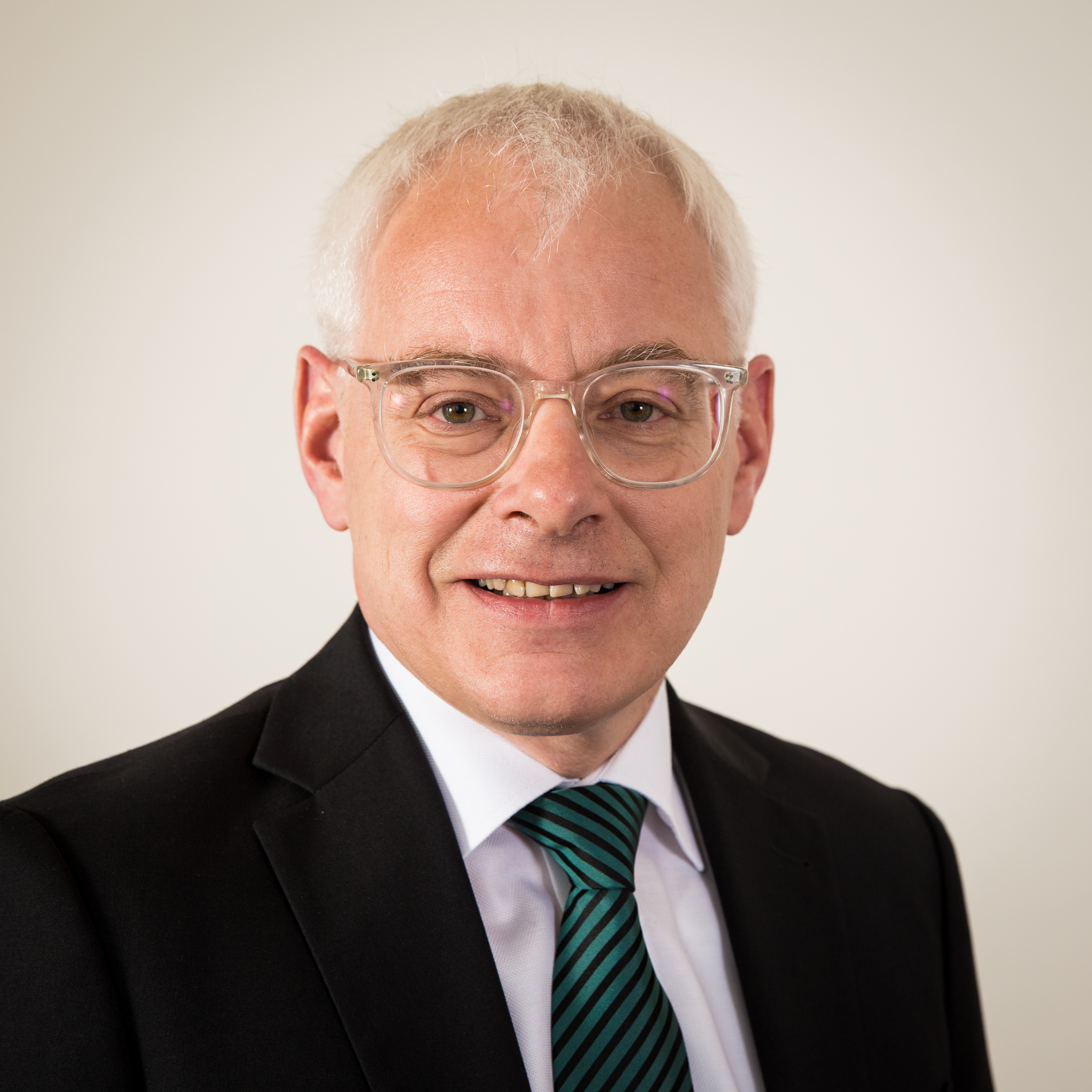
- Jürgen Barke in 2017

Deputy Minister-president of Saarland
- Incumbent
- Assumed office 26 April 2022

Personal details
- Born: 26 December 1962 (age 63) Saarbrücken, Germany
- Party: Social Democratic Party of Germany

Jürgen Barke (born 26 December 1962) is a German politician from the Social Democratic Party (SPD). Since 2022, he has been Minister for Economic Affairs, Innovation, Digitalization and Energy and Deputy Minister-President of Saarland. Previously, from 2012 to 2022, he was State Secretary with cabinet rank in the Saarland Ministry for Economic Affairs, Labour, Energy and Transport.

== Personal life ==
Jürgen Barke is married and the father of two children. He grew up in Schmelz, and currently lives in Lebach.

== Career ==
After successfully completing his dual studies program at Saarland University of Applied Sciences for Public Administration, graduating with a degree in Public Administration (FH), Jürgen Barke began his career in 1986 as a government inspector in the higher-level non-technical civil service at the Saarland Ministry of the Interior. That same year, he was transferred to the then Ministry of Economic Affairs, where he primarily worked in the area of regulatory administration (expropriation proceedings, compensation payments). In 1990 and 1991, he gained initial experience in administrative politics as the personal advisor to the State Secretary for Economic Affairs. From 1991 to 2001, Barke served as the full-time First Deputy Mayor of the city of Lebach and simultaneously head of the departments for construction, environment, social services, and public order. During this time, he completed, among other things, advanced training in corporate real estate (Immobilienmarkt) at NACORE Corporate-Real-Estate-Management Inc. (now GlobalCore Inc.). Barke chose the following areas of focus for his further training: "Government Interventions in Real Estate Markets", "Long-Term Development Trends in the German Real Estate Industry", "Strategic Corporate Management and Financing", "Business Accounting", and "Market Failure – Causes and Solutions for Real Estate Market Segments". Afterwards, he worked as Head of Human Resources and Authorized Signatory at the automotive supplier Michels GmbH.

In 2002, he founded Jürgen Barke Consult in Lebach, specializing in project development and conversion management for public and private investments. In 2003, he merged this company into KomCon GmbH in Lebach, becoming its sole shareholder and managing director. Following the founding of KomCon, he expanded his activities to include "M&A consulting for corporate restructuring and reorganization processes" and "fiduciary investment management".

On 9 May 2012, he became State Secretary with cabinet rank in the Ministry for Economic Affairs, Labour, Energy and Transport. He held this office until 26 April 2022, when he was appointed Minister for Economic Affairs, Innovation, Digitalisation and Energy of Saarland. At the same time, he was appointed Deputy Minister-President in the Rehlinger cabinet.

== Party ==
Jürgen Barke has been deputy chairman of the SPD local association in Lebach since 15 December 2023. Between 2011 and 2013 he held the office of treasurer of the SPD Saarland.
