= Ulrich Commerçon =

German politician (born 1968)

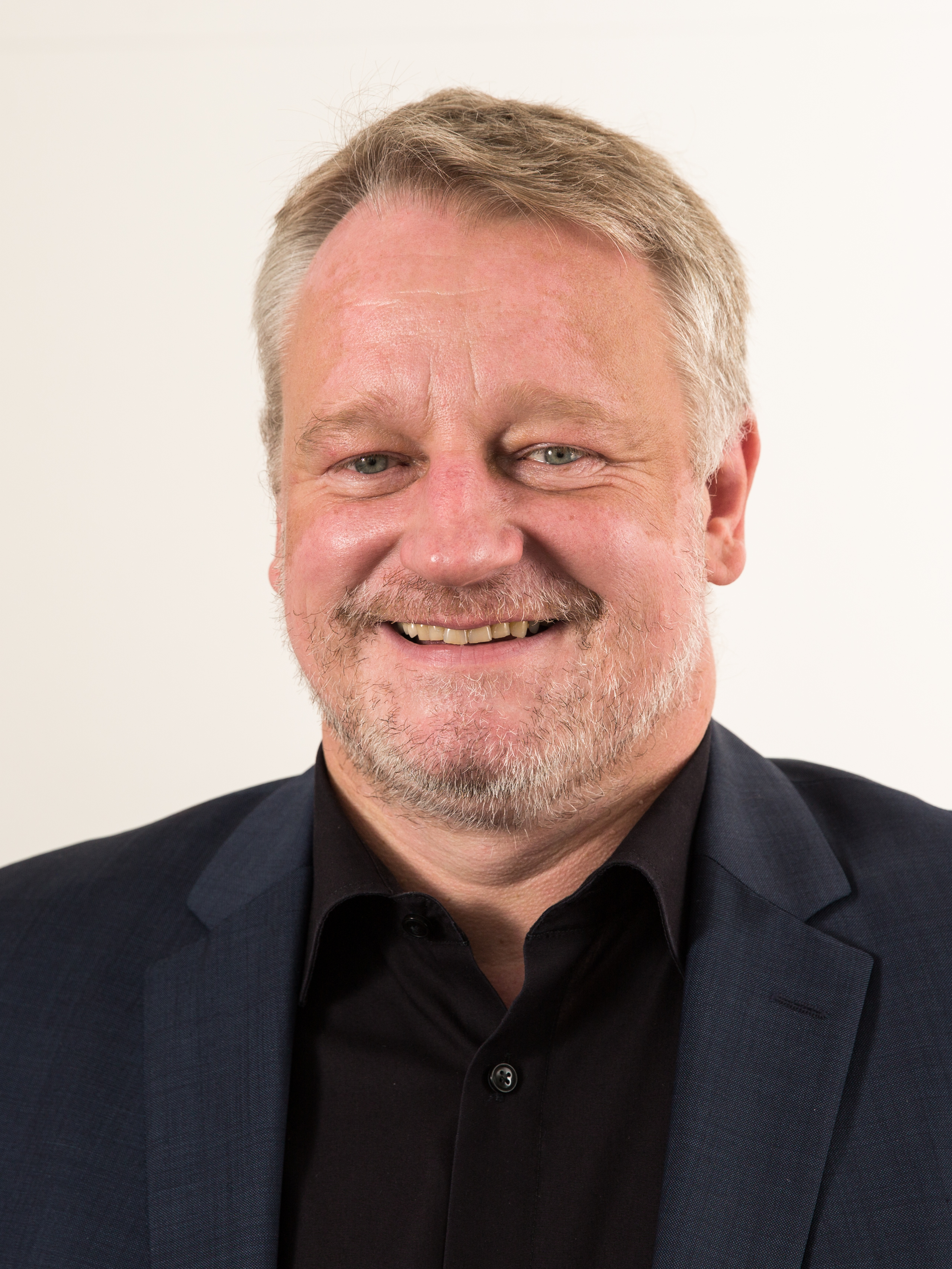
- Commerçon in 2017

Minister of Education and Culture of Saarland
- In office 9 May 2012 – 18 September 2019
- Minister-President: Annegret Kramp-Karrenbauer; Tobias Hans
- Preceded by: Klaus Kessler
- Succeeded by: Christine Streichert-Clivot

Personal details
- Born: 28 April 1968 (age 57)
- Party: Social Democratic Party (since 1987)

Ulrich Commerçon (born 28 April 1968) is a German politician serving as a member of the Landtag of Saarland since 1999. From 2012 to 2019, he served as minister of education and culture of Saarland.
