= 2017 Saarland state election =

German state election

← 2012	26 March 2017	2022 →

All 51 seats in the Landtag of Saarland 26 seats needed for a majority
- Turnout: 533,783 (69.7%) ▲8.1%
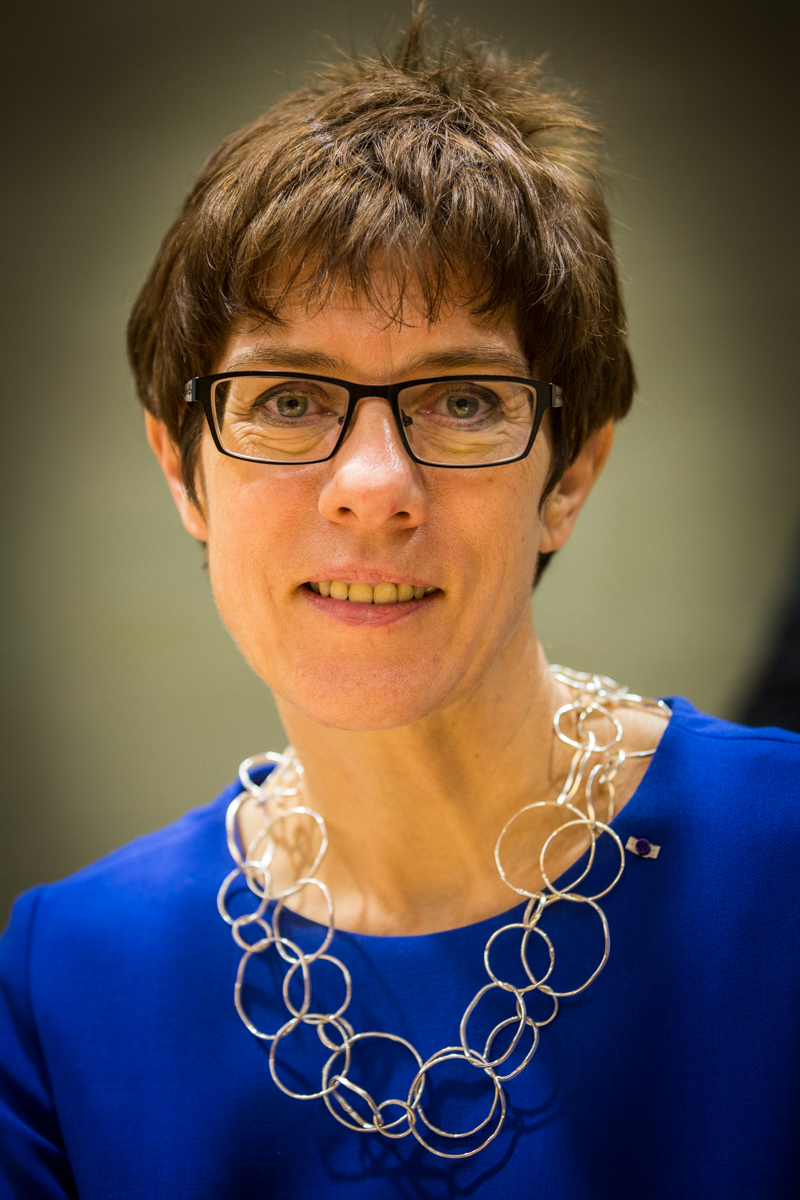

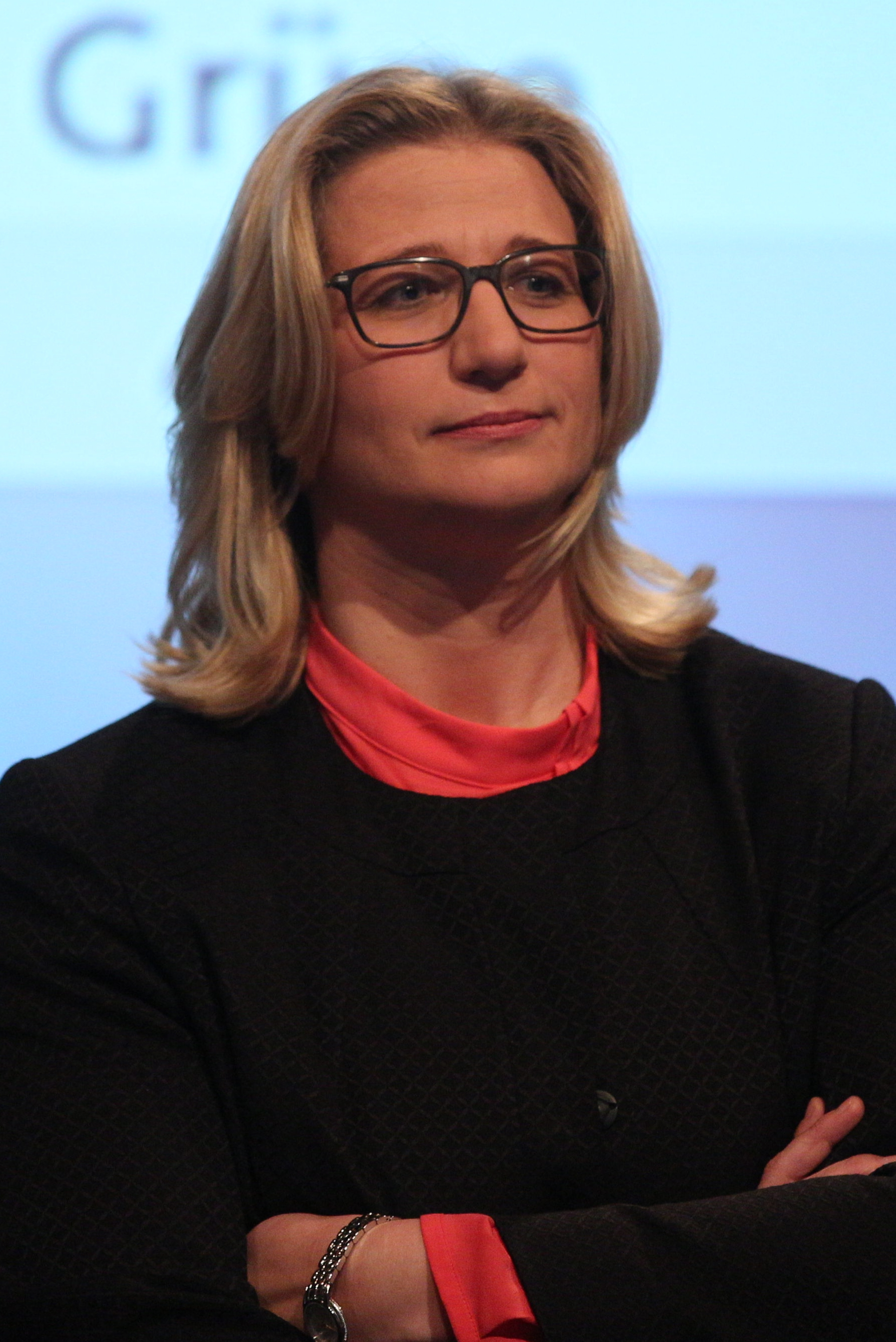

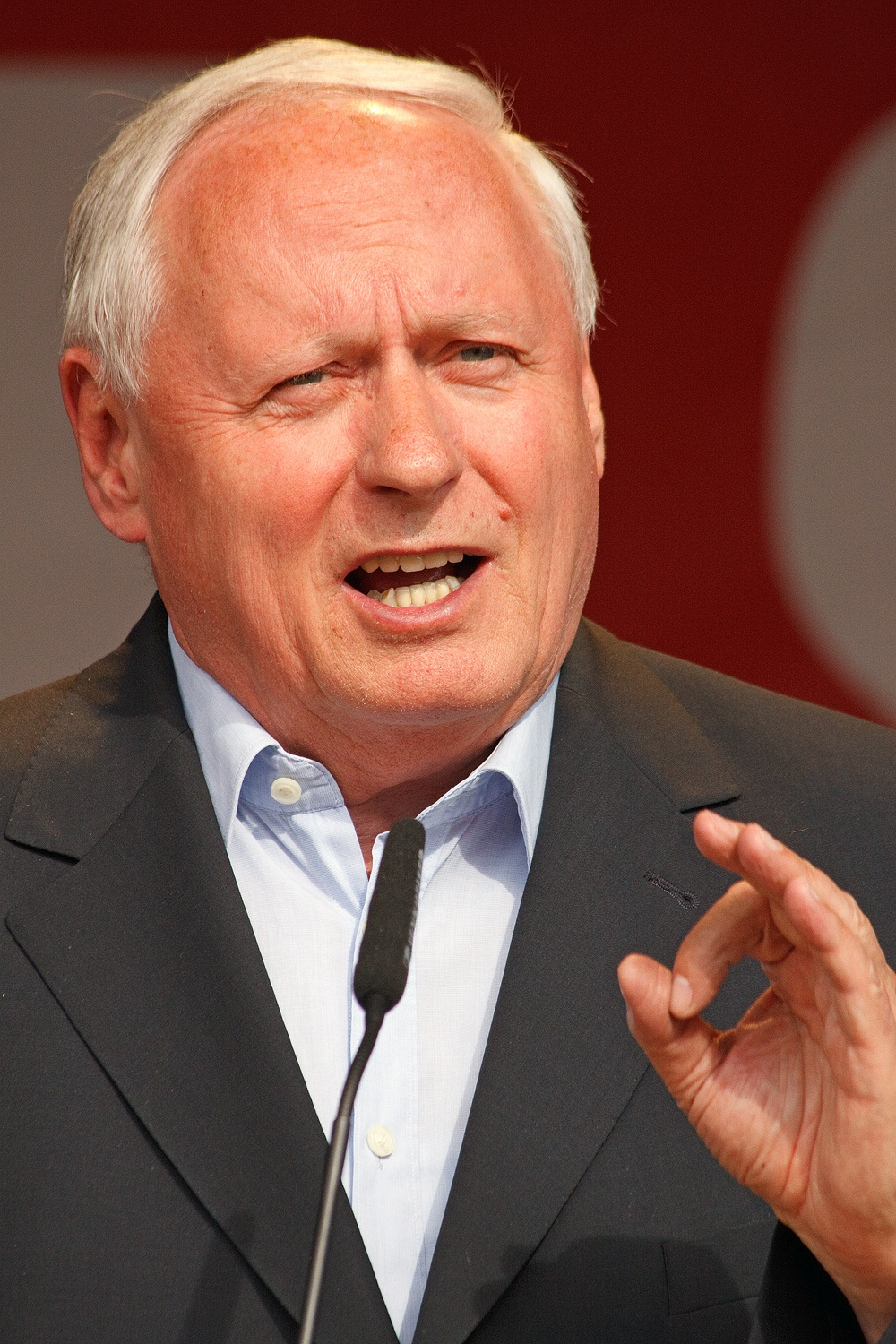

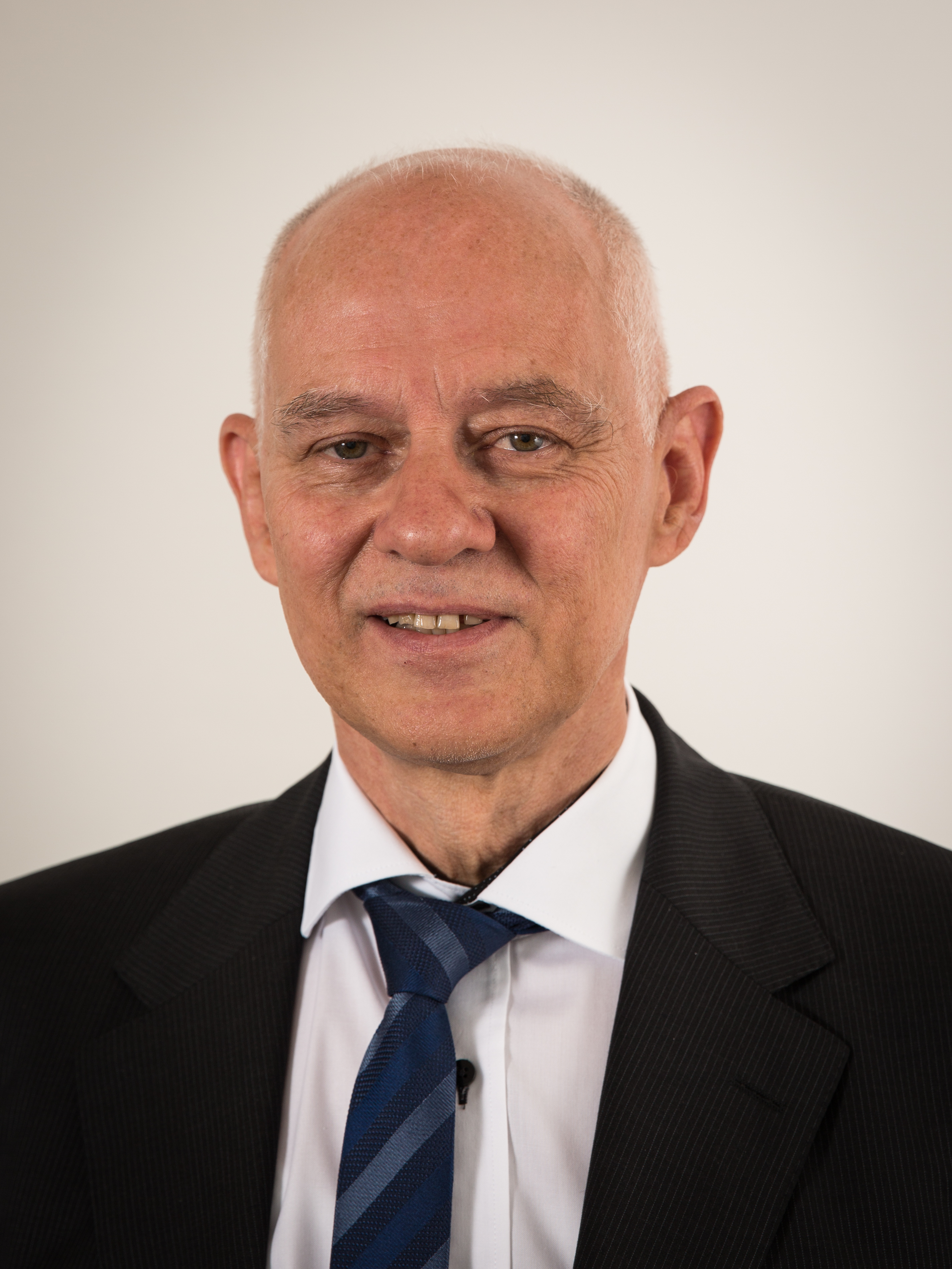
	First party	Second party
Leader	Annegret Kramp-Karrenbauer	Anke Rehlinger
Party	CDU	SPD
Leader since	28 May 2011	18 June 2016
Last election	19 seats, 35.2%	17 seats, 30.6%
Seats won	24	17
Seat change	▲5	0
Popular vote	217,263	158,057
Percentage	40.7%	29.6%
Swing	▲5.5%	▼1.0%
	Third party	Fourth party
Leader	Oskar Lafontaine	Rudolf Müller
Party	Left	AfD
Leader since	9 August 2008	16 September 2016
Last election	9 seats, 16.1%	Did not exist
Seats won	7	3
Seat change	▼2	▲3
Popular vote	68,566	32,971
Percentage	12.8%	6.2%
Swing	▼3.3%	New party
Government before election
Second Kramp-Karrenbauer cabinet
CDU–SPD
Government after election
Third Kramp-Karrenbauer cabinet
CDU–SPD

The 2017 Saarland state election was held on 26 March 2017 to elect the members of the Landtag of Saarland. The incumbent grand coalition of the Christian Democratic Union (CDU) and Social Democratic Party (SPD) led by Minister-President Annegret Kramp-Karrenbauer was returned with an increased majority.

Even though the Saarland is the second smallest state by population and does not represent Germany as a whole demographically, the election proved to be of pivotal importance to the following state elections and in particular the federal election later that year. Then-SPD leader Martin Schulz led the party to new heights in early 2017 and polls showed the SPD capturing the Minister-President's office in this first election of the year, but the upset CDU victory marked the beginning of a decline in the polls both nationally and in other state elections. This decline culminated in heavy losses for the SPD in Schleswig-Holstein, in North Rhine-Westphalia and, ultimately, in the 2017 German federal election.

== Background ==
The 2012 state election was called after the collapse of the Jamaica coalition of the CDU, Free Democratic Party (FDP) and The Greens. The election saw the collapse of the FDP, a downswing for The Left and Greens, gains for the SPD, and the entry of the Pirates. Afterwards, the CDU and SPD formed a grand coalition.

== Parties ==
The table below lists parties represented in the previous Landtag of Saarland.

Name		Ideology	Leader(s)	2012 result		since 2015
Name		Ideology	Leader(s)	Votes (%)	Seats	since 2015
CDU	Christian Democratic Union of Germany; Christlich Demokratische Union Deutschlands	Christian democracy	Annegret Kramp-Karrenbauer	35.2%	19 / 51	19 / 51
SPD	Social Democratic Party of Germany; Sozialdemokratische Partei Deutschlands	Social democracy	Anke Rehlinger	30.6%	17 / 51	18 / 51
Linke	The Left; Die Linke	Democratic socialism	Oskar Lafontaine	16.1%	9 / 51	8 / 51
Piraten	Pirate Party Germany; Piratenpartei Deutschland	Pirate politics	Gerd Rainer Weber	7.4%	4 / 51	3 / 51
Grüne	Alliance 90/The Greens; Bündnis 90/Die Grünen	Green politics	Hubert Ulrich; Barbara Meyer-Gluche	5.0%	2 / 51	3 / 51

== Opinion polling ==
=== Party polling ===
Publication date	Poll source	Christian Democratic Union of Germany	Social Democratic Party of Germany	The Left (Germany)	Pirate Party Germany	Alliance '90/The Greens	Free Democratic Party (Germany)	Alternative for Germany	Others	Lead
26 March 2017	2017 state election	40.7	29.6	12.9	0.7	4.0	3.3	6.2	1.9	11.1
23 Mar 2017	Forschungsgruppe Wahlen	37	32	12.5	–	4.5	4	6	4	5
22 Mar 2017	INSA	35	33	13	–	4	5	6	4	2
17 Mar 2017	Forschungsgruppe Wahlen	37	32	12	–	4	4	7	4	5
16 Mar 2017	Infratest dimap	35	34	13	–	4.5	3	6.5	4	1
9 Mar 2017	Forsa	34	33	13	–	5	4	6	5	1
7 Mar 2017	INSA	36	33	12	–	4	4	7	4	3
26 Jan 2017	Infratest dimap	38	26	14	–	5	4	9	4	12
13 Jan 2017	INSA	35	24	16	–	6	5	10	2	11
15 Nov 2016	Forsa	37	26	15	–	6	3	9	4	11
11 May 2016	Infratest dimap	34	29	12	–	7	4	11	3	5
31 Mar 2015	Infratest dimap	40	33	10	1	6	2	4	4	7
25 May 2014	2014 European election	34.9	34.4	6.6	1.7	6.0	2.2	6.8	7.4	0.5
14 May 2014	Infratest dimap	37	34	13	2	5	–	5	4	3
22 Sep 2013	2013 federal election	37.8	31.0	10.0	2.6	5.7	3.8	5.2	3.9	6.8
7 May 2013	Infratest dimap	39	36	10	2	6	2	3	2	3
25 March 2012	2012 state election	35.2	30.6	16.1	7.4	5.0	1.2	–	4.4	4.6

=== Minister-President polling ===
Publication date	Poll source				None
Publication date	Poll source	Annegret Kramp-Karrenbauer CDU	Anke Rehlinger SPD	Heiko Maas SPD	None
23 Mar 2017	Forschungsgruppe Wahlen	53.0	34.0	–	13.0
17 Mar 2017	Forschungsgruppe Wahlen	55.0	31.0	–	14.0
16 Mar 2017	Infratest dimap	51.0	32.0	–	7.0
26 Jan 2017	Infratest dimap	60.0	23.0	–	9.0
15 Nov 2016	Forsa	54.0	19.0	–	–
11 May 2016	Infratest dimap	59.0	26.0	–	10.0
31 Mar 2015	Infratest dimap	62.0	18.0	–	9.0
14 May 2014	Infratest dimap	53.0	–	35.0	6.0
7 May 2013	Infratest dimap	53.0	–	36.0	7.0

== Election result ==
Summary of the 26 March 2017 election results for the Landtag of Saarland
Party	Votes	%	+/-	Seats	+/-	Seats %
Christian Democratic Union (CDU)	217,263	40.7	▲5.5	24	▲5	47.1
Social Democratic Party (SPD)	158,057	29.6	▼1.0	17	0	33.3
The Left (Linke)	68,566	12.8	▼3.3	7	▼2	13.7
Alternative for Germany (AfD)	32,971	6.2	New	3	New	5.9
Alliance 90/The Greens (Grüne)	21,392	4.0	▼1.0	0	▼2	0
Free Democratic Party (FDP)	17,419	3.3	▲2.1	0	±0	0
Family Party of Germany (FAMILIE)	4,435	0.8	▼0.9	0	±0	0
Pirate Party (Piraten)	3,979	0.7	▼6.7	0	▼4	0
National Democratic Party (NPD)	3,744	0.7	▼0.5	0	±0	0
Others	5,957	1.1		0	±0	0
Total	533,783	100.0		51	±0	
Voter turnout		69.7	▲8.1			

Popular Vote
CDU	40.70%
SPD	29.61%
DIE LINKE	12.85%
AfD	6.18%
B'90/GRÜNE	4.01%
FDP	3.26%
Other	1.12%

Landtag seats
CDU	47.06%
SPD	33.33%
DIE LINKE	12.73%
AfD	5.88%

== Outcome ==
Observers were surprised by the CDU's strong performance, as opinion polls predicted a close contest between the CDU and SPD. After the election, several commentators described the results as a boost for the September 2017 electoral prospects of German Chancellor Angela Merkel and the CDU, and as a setback for SPD leader Martin Schulz.

As both the CDU and SPD refused to coalition with AfD, the CDU and SPD coalition reached an agreement to continue governing together after the election.
