= 2012 Saarland state election =

State election in Germany

- 25 March 2012

All 51 seats of the Landtag of the Saarland 26 seats needed for a majority
- Turnout: 481,294 (61.6%) ▼6.0%
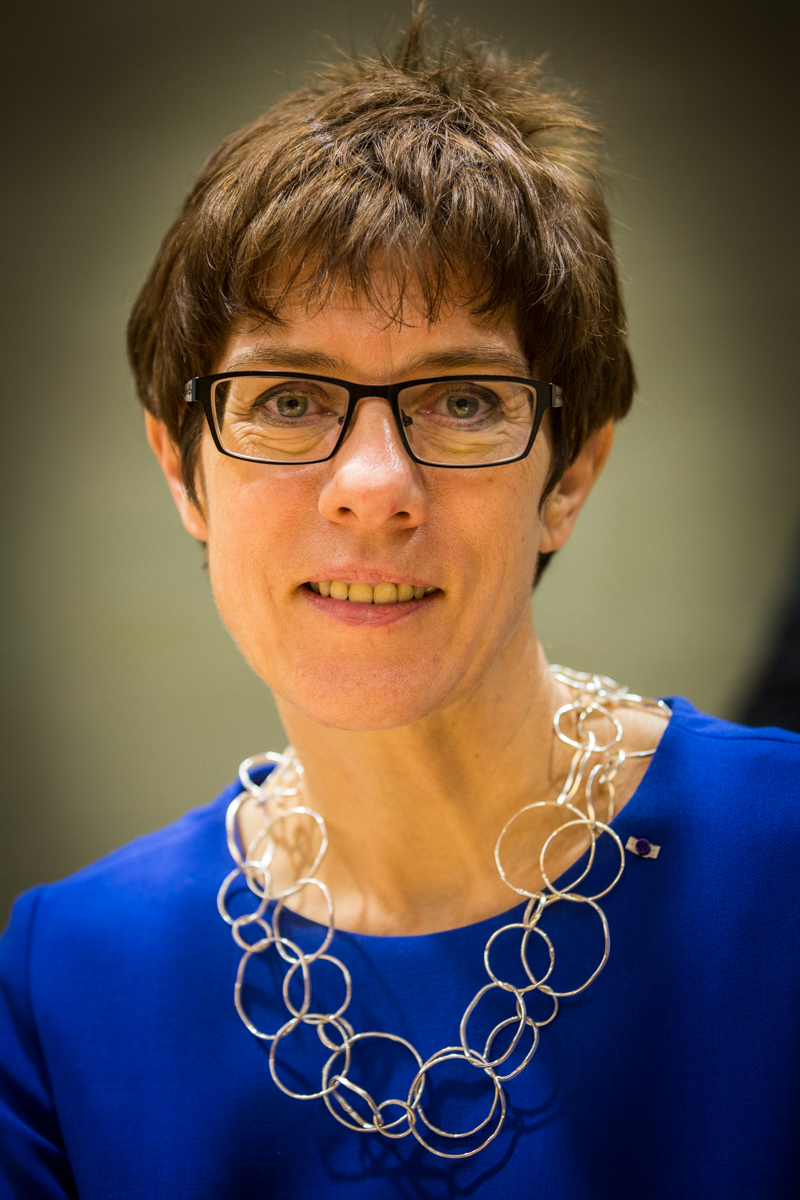

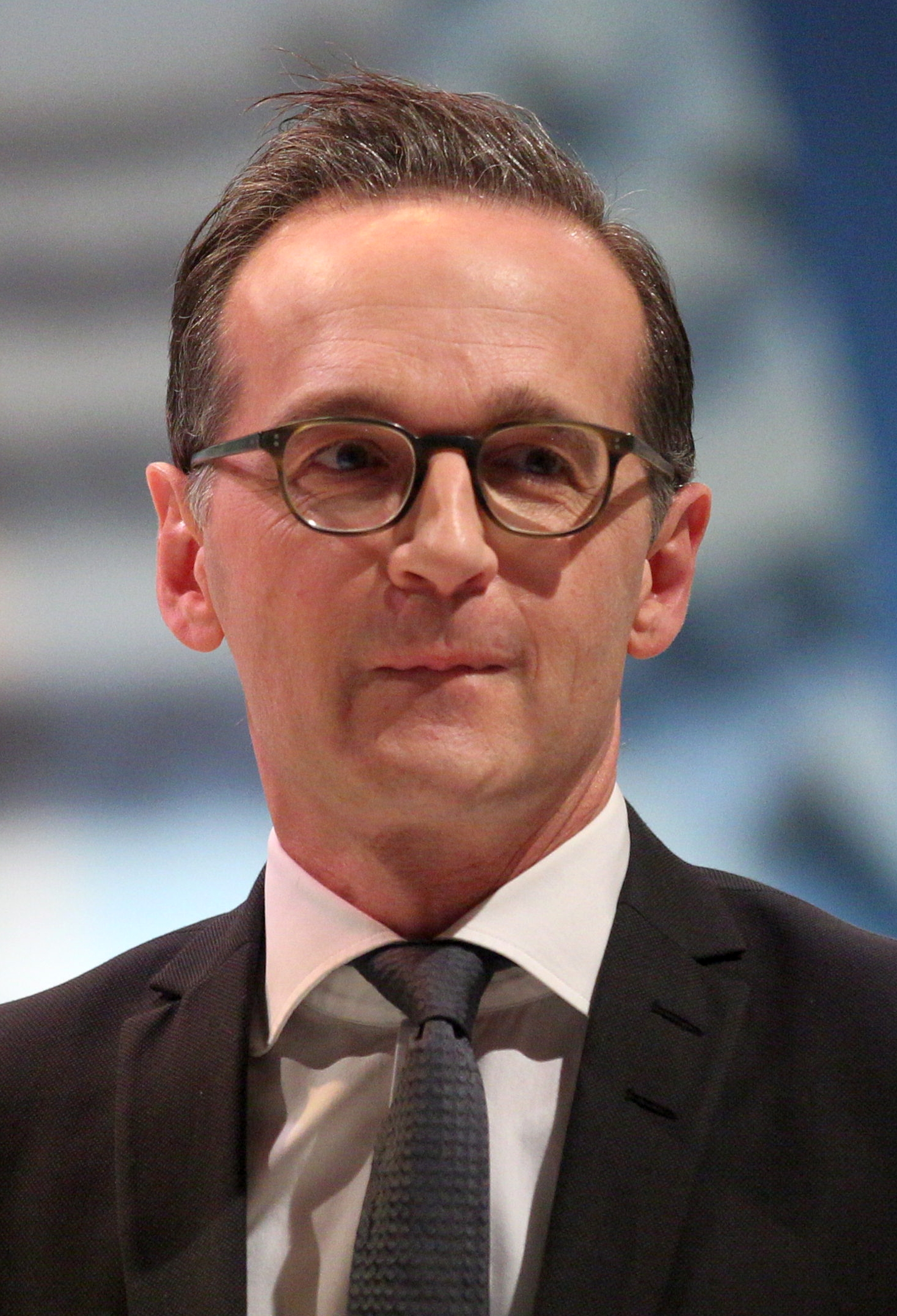

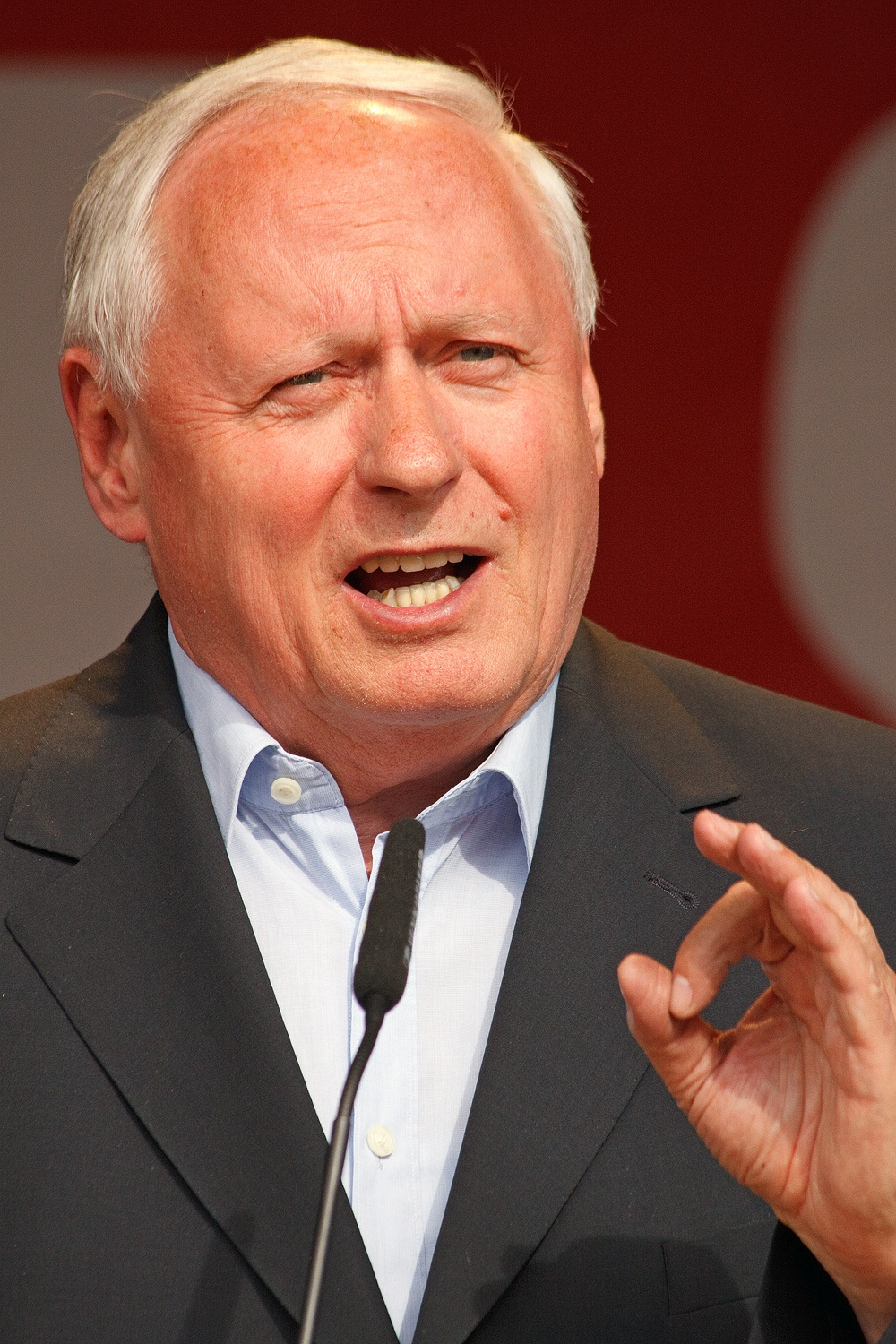

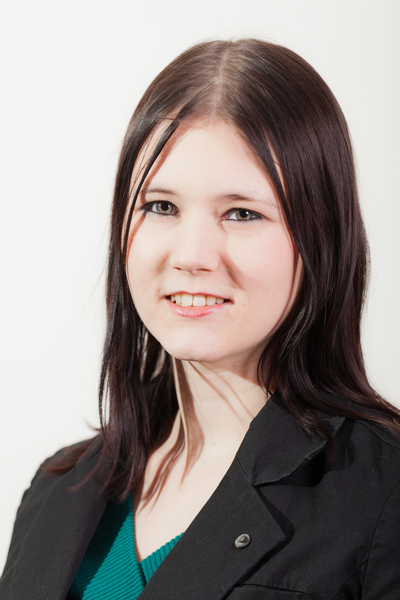

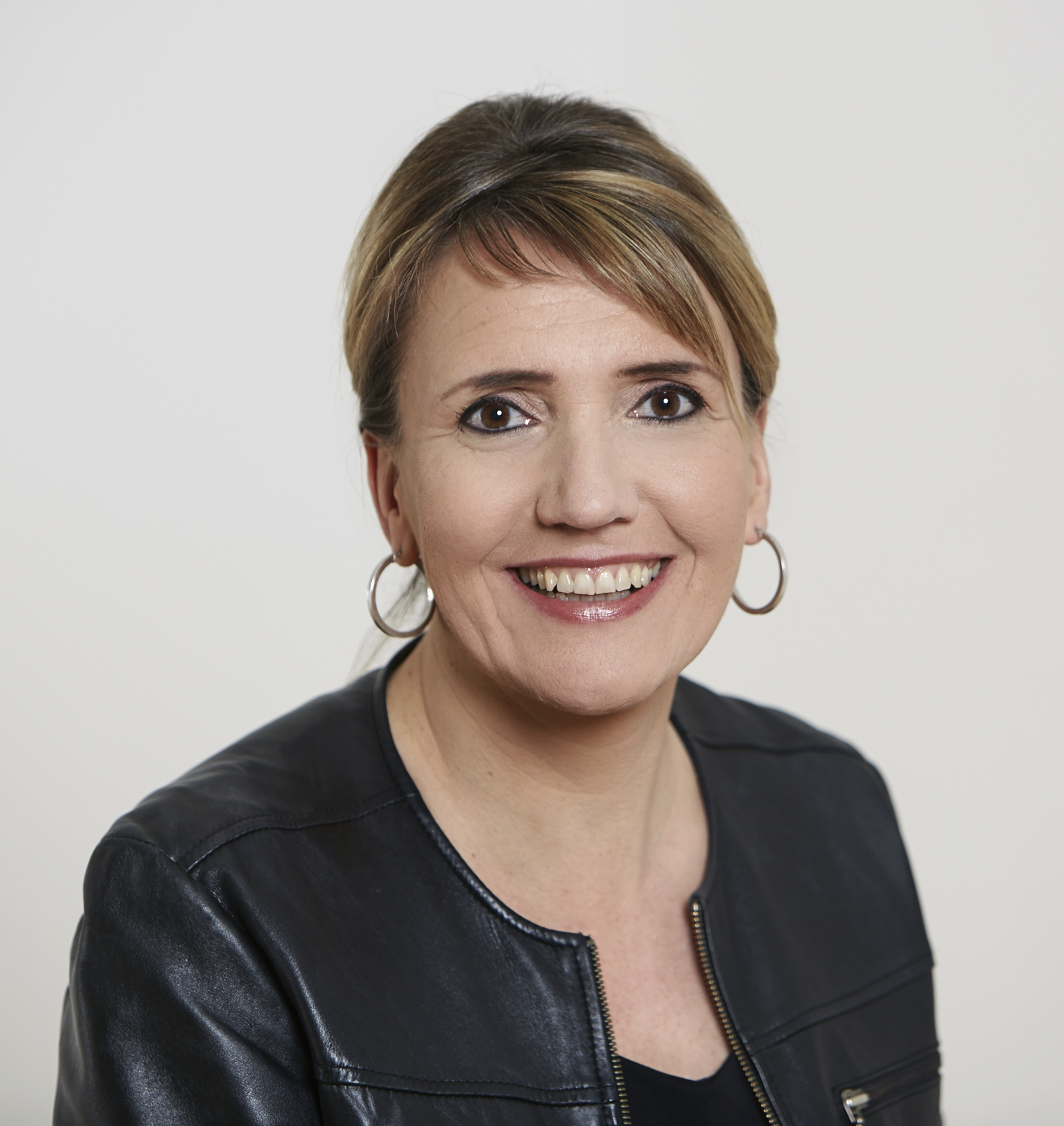
	First party	Second party	Third party
Leader	Annegret Kramp-Karrenbauer	Heiko Maas	Oskar Lafontaine
Party	CDU	SPD	Left
Last election	19 seats, 34.5%	13 seats, 24.5%	11 seats, 21.3%
Seats won	19	17	9
Seat change	0	▲4	▼2
Popular vote	169,617	147,170	77,612
Percentage	35.2%	30.6%	16.1%
Swing	▲0.7%	▲6.1%	▼5.2%
	Fourth party	Fifth party
Leader	Jasmin Maurer	Simone Peter
Party	Pirates	Greens
Last election	Did not contest	3 seats, 5.9%
Seats won	4	2
Seat change	▲4	▼1
Popular vote	35,656	24,252
Percentage	7.4%	5.0%
Swing	▲7.4%	▼0.9%
Minister-President before election
Annegret Kramp-Karrenbauer
CDU
Elected Minister-President
Annegret Kramp-Karrenbauer
CDU

The 2012 Saarland state election was held in on 25 March 2012 to elect the members of the Landtag of Saarland. The election was triggered by the collapse of the previous coalition government comprising the Christian Democratic Union (CDU) led by Minister-President Annegret Kramp-Karrenbauer, Free Democratic Party (FDP), and The Greens. The CDU subsequently formed a grand coalition with the Social Democratic Party (SPD), and Kramp-Karrenbauer was re-elected as Minister-President.

== Background ==
After the 2009 state election, a Jamaica coalition (CDU–FDP–Green) government took office, the first of its kind in Germany. The government collapsed on 6 January 2012 due to internal issues in the FDP. Minister-President Kramp-Karrenbauer stated that "[a] credible and reliable cooperation is no longer completely possible in this coalition." The CDU held discussions with the Social Democratic Party in an attempt to form a grand coalition, but this failed, causing early elections to be called.

== Parties ==
The table below lists parties represented in the previous Landtag of Saarland.

Name		Ideology	Leader(s)	2009 result	
Name		Ideology	Leader(s)	Votes (%)	Seats
CDU	Christian Democratic Union of Germany; Christlich Demokratische Union Deutschlands	Christian democracy	Annegret Kramp-Karrenbauer	34.5%	19 / 51
SPD	Social Democratic Party of Germany; Sozialdemokratische Partei Deutschlands	Social democracy	Heiko Maas	24.5%	13 / 51
Linke	The Left; Die Linke	Democratic socialism	Oskar Lafontaine	21.3%	11 / 51
FDP	Free Democratic Party; Freie Demokratische Partei	Classical liberalism	Oliver Luksic	9.2%	5 / 51
Grüne	Alliance 90/The Greens; Bündnis 90/Die Grünen	Green politics	Simone Peter	5.9%	3 / 51

== Opinion polling ==
Polling firm	Fieldwork date	Sample size	CDU	SPD	Linke	FDP	Grüne	Piraten	Others	Lead
2012 state election	25 Mar 2012	–	35.2	30.6	16.1	1.2	5.0	7.4	4.5	4.6
Forschungsgruppe Wahlen	13–15 Mar 2012	1,053	34	34	15	2	5	6	4	Tie
Infratest dimap	13–15 Mar 2012	1,000	33	33	16	3	5	6	4	Tie
Forsa	20–29 Feb 2012	1,002	35	37	14	1	4	5	4	2
Infratest dimap	21–22 Feb 2012	1,001	35	36	15	2	4	5	3	1
Emnid	24–25 Jan 2012	1,000	36	36	15	2	5	4	2	Tie
Forschungsgruppe Wahlen	23–25 Jan 2012	1,039	34	38	13	2	6	5	2	4
Infratest dimap	11–15 Nov 2011	1,000	32	35	12	5	8	4	4	3
Infratest dimap	1–3 Nov 2010	1,001	32	34	17	4	9	–	4	2
Infratest dimap	10–13 Dec 2009	1,000	32	29	19	9	7	–	4	3
2009 state election	30 Aug 2009	–	34.5	24.5	21.3	9.2	5.9	–	4.6	10.0

== Election result ==
Summary of the 25 March 2012 election results for the Landtag of Saarland
Party	Votes	%	+/-	Seats	+/-	Seats %
Christian Democratic Union (CDU)	169,617	35.2	▲0.7	19	0	37.3
Social Democratic Party (SPD)	147,170	30.6	▲6.1	17	▲4	33.3
The Left (Linke)	77,612	16.1	▼5.2	9	▼2	17.6
Pirate Party (Piraten)	35,656	7.4	▲7.4	4	▲4	7.8
Alliance 90/The Greens (Grüne)	24,252	5.0	▼0.9	2	▼1	3.9
Family Party of Germany (FAMILIE)	8,394	1.7	▼0.3	0	±0	0
Free Democratic Party (FDP)	5,871	1.2	▼8.0	0	▼5	0
National Democratic Party (NPD)	5,606	1.2	▼0.3	0	±0	0
Others	7,116	1.5		0	±0	0
Total	481,294	100.0		51	±0	
Voter turnout		61.6	▼6.0			

Popular Vote
CDU	35.24%
SPD	30.58%
DIE LINKE	16.13%
PIRATEN	7.41%
B'90/GRÜNE	5.04%
Other	5.61%

Landtag seats
CDU	37.25%
SPD	33.33%
DIE LINKE	17.65%
PIRATEN	7.84%
B'90/GRÜNE	3.92%

== Outcome ==
Having been reelected as the largest party in the Landtag, CDU was tasked with forming the government. Minister-President Annegret Kramp-Karrenbauer said that she was seeking to form a grand coalition with the SPD, which have 37 seats altogether. Both parties reached a coalition agreement on 24 April 2012. The CDU and SPD would control 3 ministries each. Kramp-Karrenbauer will also head the new government which will be sworn on 9 May 2012.

On 9 May 2012 Kramp-Karrenbauer's new government gained the vote of confidence with 37 votes. There was 12 votes against and 2 abstentions. Her cabinet was later endorsed by the Landtag with the same number of votes.
