= Anja Wagner-Scheid =

German politician (born 1974)

Member of the Landtag of Saarland
- Incumbent
- Assumed office 25 April 2022
- In office 29 September 2004 – 23 September 2009

Personal details
- Born: 9 October 1974 (age 51)
- Party: Christian Democratic Union (since 1997)

Anja Wagner-Scheid (née Wagner; born 9 October 1974) is a German politician. She has been a member of the Landtag of Saarland since 2022, having previously served from 2004 to 2009. From 2019 to 2022, she served as state secretary of finance of Saarland.
