= Christine Streichert-Clivot =

German politician (born 1980)

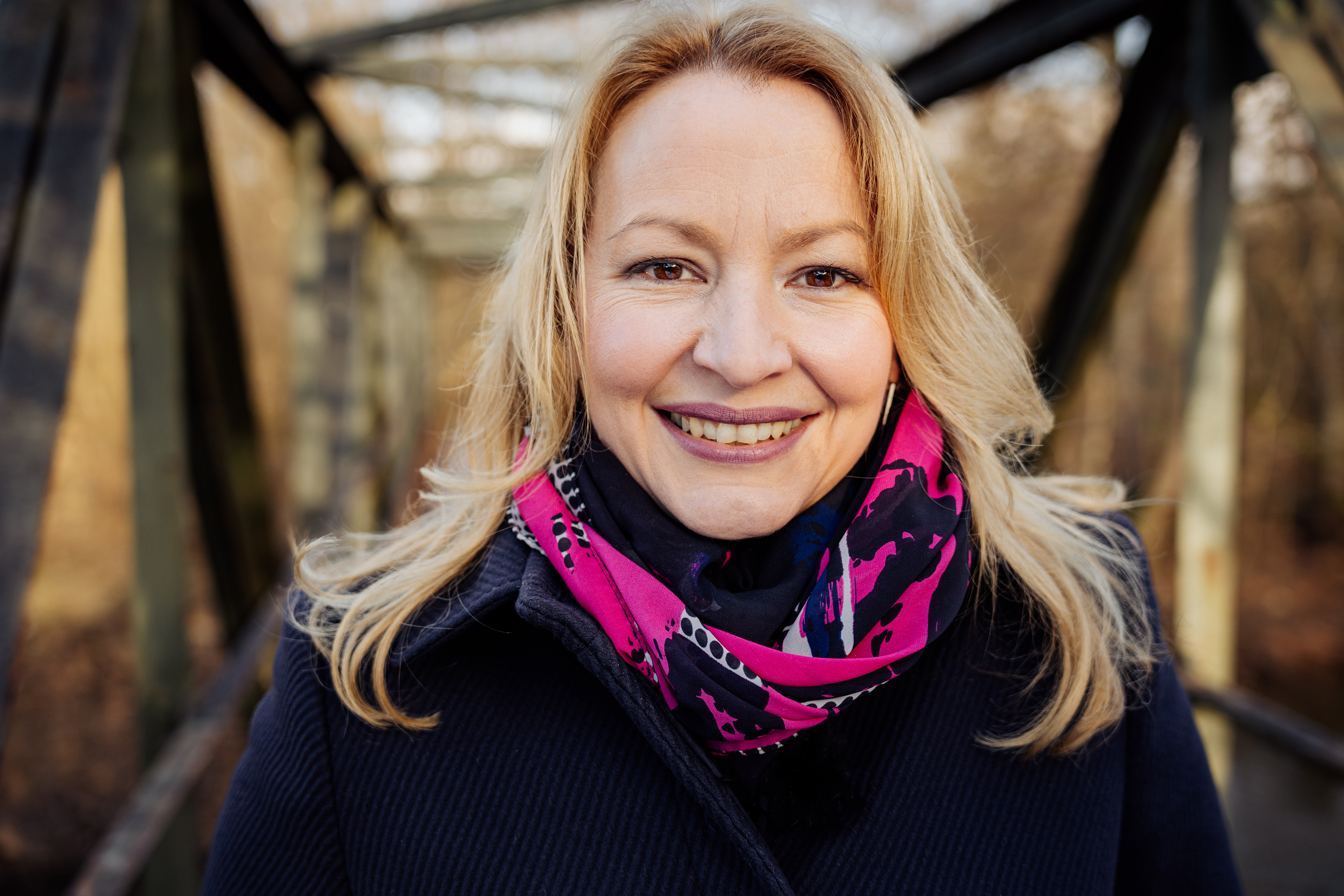
- Streichert-Clivot in 2022

Minister of Education and Culture of Saarland
- Incumbent
- Assumed office 18 September 2019
- Minister-President: Tobias Hans; Anke Rehlinger
- Preceded by: Ulrich Commerçon

Personal details
- Born: 28 April 1980 (age 45) Saarbrücken
- Party: Social Democratic Party

Christine Ursula Streichert-Clivot (born 28 April 1980 in Saarbrücken) is a German politician serving as minister of education and culture of Saarland since 2019. She has been a member of the Landtag of Saarland since 2022.
