= Reinhold Jost (politician) =

German politician (born 1966)

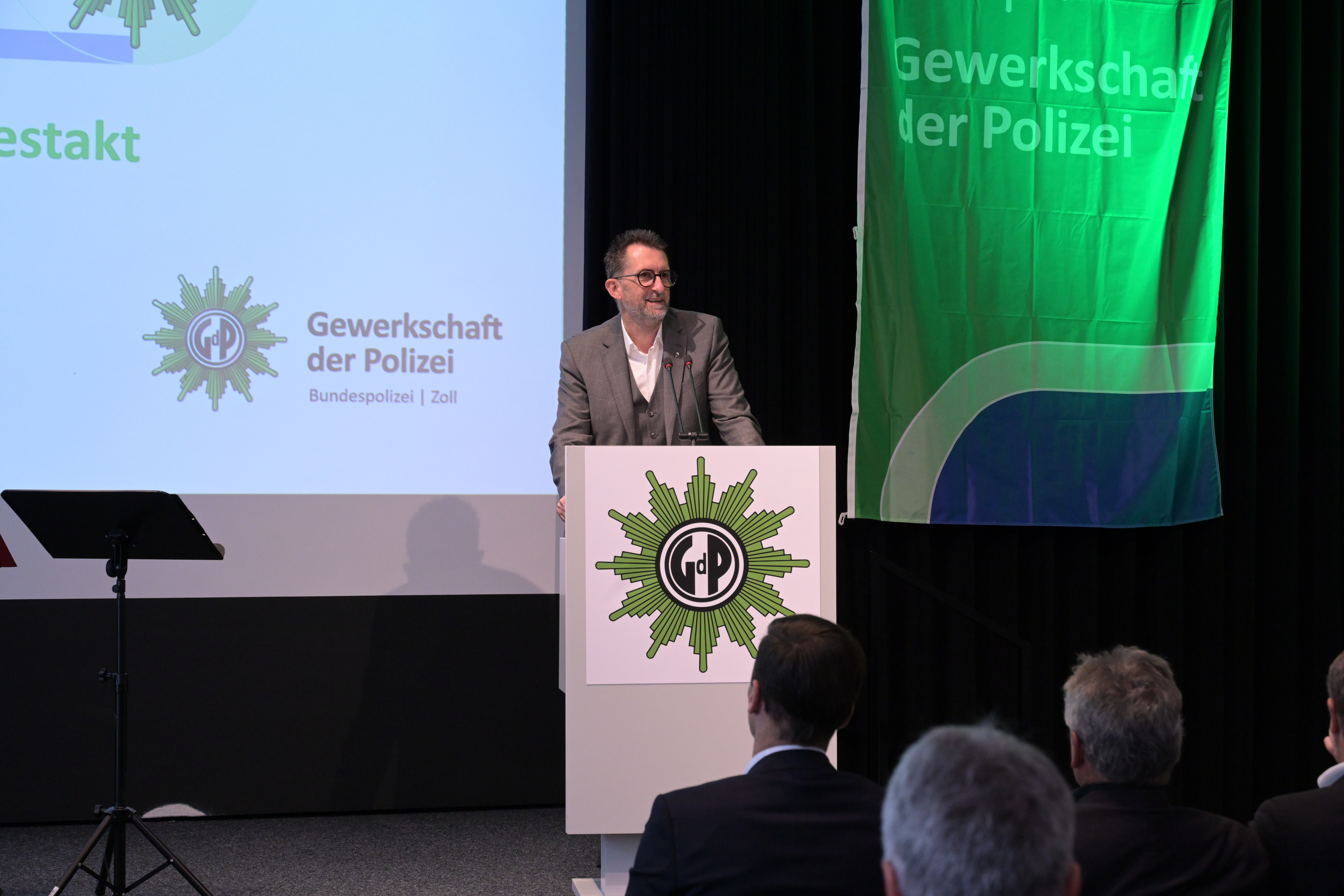
- Jost in 2023

Minister of the Interior, Construction and Sport of Saarland
- Incumbent
- Assumed office 26 April 2022
- Minister-President: Anke Rehlinger
- Preceded by: Klaus Bouillon

Personal details
- Born: 4 June 1966 (age 59) Saarlouis
- Party: Social Democratic Party (since 1983)

Reinhold Jost (born 4 June 1966 in Saarlouis) is a German politician serving as minister of the interior, construction and sport of Saarland since 2022. From 2017 to 2022, he served as minister of the environment and consumer protection. From 2014 to 2017, he served as minister of justice and minister of the environment and consumer protection. From 2013 to 2014, he was a member of the Bundestag. He has been a member of the Landtag of Saarland since 2005, having previously served from 1999 to 2004.
