= Klaus Bouillon =

German politician

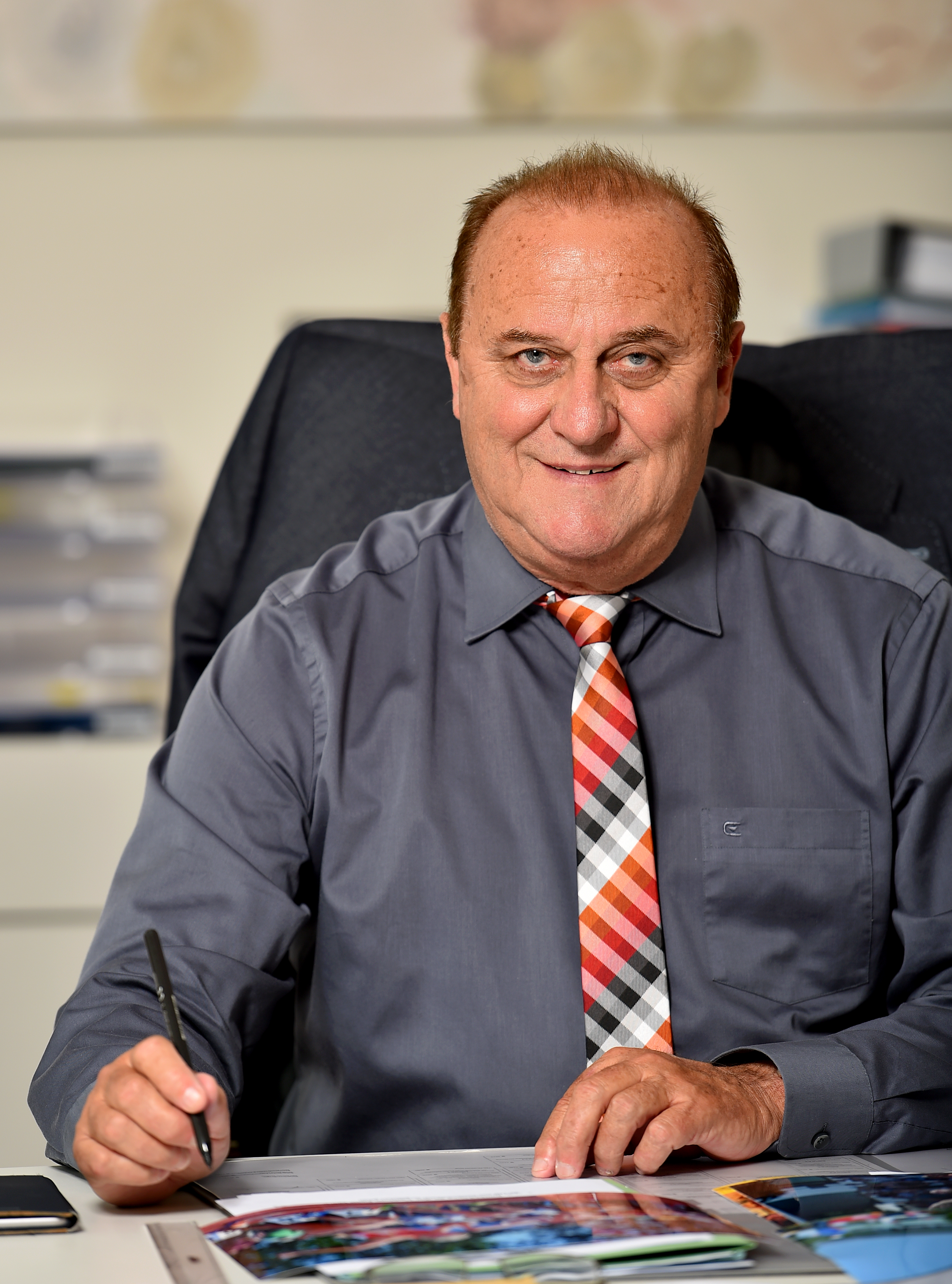
Klaus Bouillon (2015)

Klaus Bouillon (born 19 November 1947 in St. Wendel) is a German politician. He is a member of the CDU. From 1983 to 2014 he was mayor of his town of birth. In 2014 he became Minister of the Interior of the German state of Saarland. In 2016 he was chairman of the Standing Conference of Interior Ministers ("Innenministerkonferenz", IMK) in Germany.

== Career ==
After high school diploma in Ottweiler in 1966, Bouillon served as a reserve officer of the Bundeswehr military police (Feldjäger). Afterwards he studied law at Saarland University. After working as a lawyer for a short period, he became staff member of the CDU politician Werner Zeyer. Bouillon pursued occupational activities for the Saarland State Insurance Agency and at Saarbrücken court. He was elected as the mayor of St. Wendel in 1983.

On 3 November 2014, the Saarland Minister President Annegret Kramp-Karrenbauer announced that she nominated Bouillon as the new Interior Minister of the state, replacing Monika Bachmann who became Minister of Health. On 12 November, he was sworn in as Interior Minister. On 1 January 2016, Saarland and Bouillon took over the rotational chairmanship of the German Conference of Interior Ministers.
