= Sebastian Thul =

German politician (born 1980)

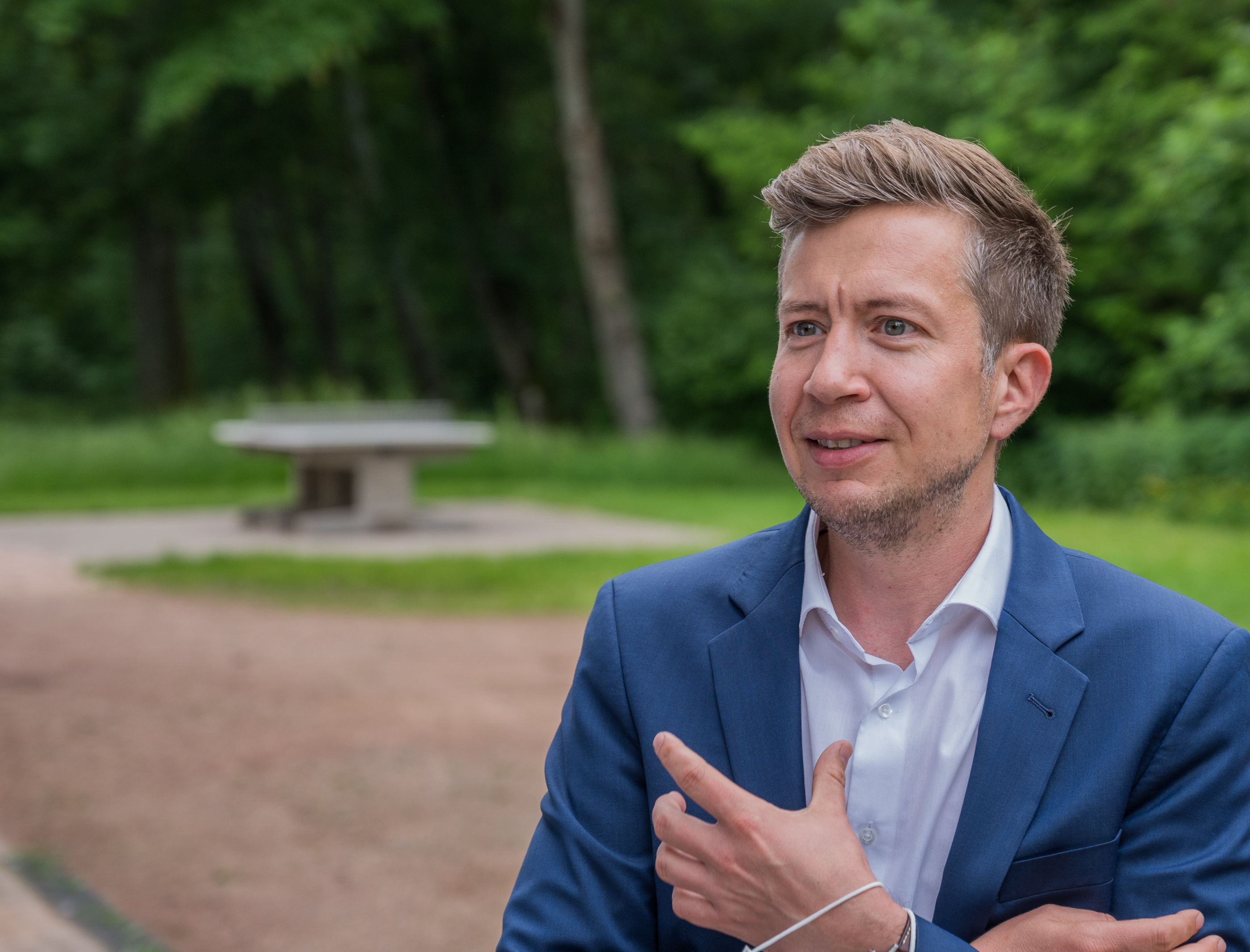
- Thul in 2021

Member of the Landtag of Saarland
- In office 24 April 2012 – 18 September 2019
- Succeeded by: Heike Winzent
- Constituency: Neunkirchen

Personal details
- Born: 18 April 1980 (age 46)
- Party: Social Democratic Party (since 1997)

Sebastian Thul (born 18 April 1980) is a German politician serving as state secretary of environment, climate, mobility, agriculture and consumer protection of Saarland since 2022. From 2019 to 2022, he served as state secretary of environment and consumer protection. From 2012 to 2019, he was a member of the Landtag of Saarland. From 2007 to 2012, he served as chairman of Jusos in Saarland.
