= Annegret Kramp-Karrenbauer =

German politician (born 1962)

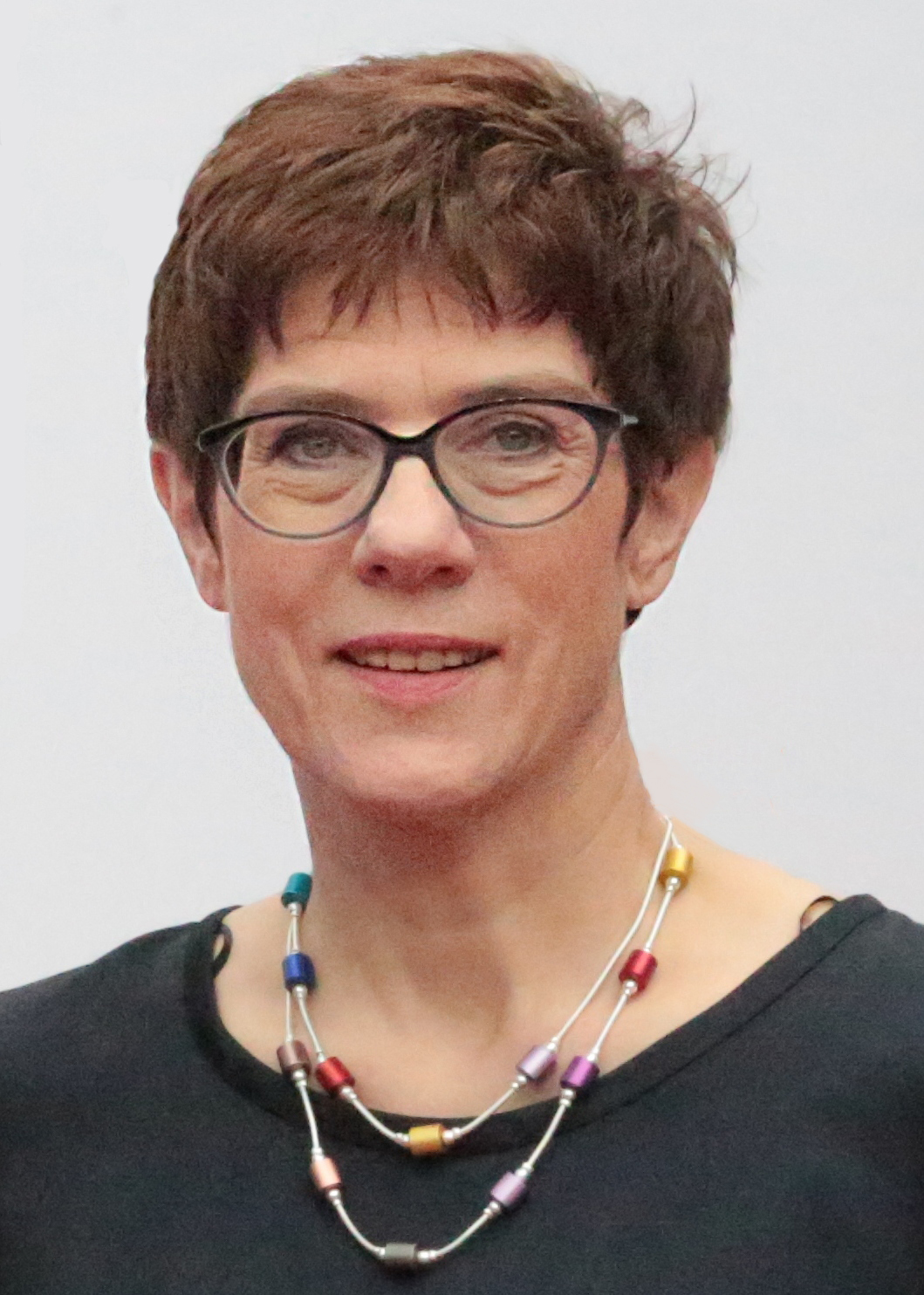
- Kramp-Karrenbauer in 2019

Chair of the Konrad Adenauer Foundation
- Incumbent
- Assumed office 1 January 2026
- General Secretary: Mark Speich
- Preceded by: Norbert Lammert

Leader of the Christian Democratic Union
- In office 7 December 2018 – 22 January 2021
- General Secretary: Paul Ziemiak
- Deputy: Volker Bouffier; Julia Klöckner; Armin Laschet; Ursula von der Leyen; Thomas Strobl; Silvia Breher
- Preceded by: Angela Merkel
- Succeeded by: Armin Laschet

General Secretary of the Christian Democratic Union
- In office 26 February 2018 – 7 December 2018
- Leader: Angela Merkel
- Preceded by: Peter Tauber
- Succeeded by: Paul Ziemiak

Minister of Defence
- In office 17 July 2019 – 8 December 2021
- Chancellor: Angela Merkel
- Preceded by: Ursula von der Leyen
- Succeeded by: Christine Lambrecht

Minister-President of the Saarland
- In office 10 August 2011 – 28 February 2018
- Deputy: Christoph Hartmann; Peter Jacoby (interim); Heiko Maas; Anke Rehlinger
- Preceded by: Peter Müller
- Succeeded by: Tobias Hans

Leader of the Christian Democratic Union in the Saarland
- In office 28 May 2011 – 19 October 2018
- General Secretary: Roland Theis
- Deputy: Peter Altmaier; Peter Jacoby; Klaus Meiser; Daniela Schlegel-Friedrich; Stephan Toscani
- Preceded by: Peter Müller
- Succeeded by: Tobias Hans
Parliamentary constituencies
Member of the Bundestag for Saarland
In office 1 March 1998 – 26 October 1998
Preceded by	Klaus Töpfer
Succeeded by	multi-member district
Constituency	Christian Democratic Union list
Member of the Landtag of Saarland
In office 29 September 2004 – 1 March 2018
Preceded by	multi-member district
Succeeded by	Timo Mildau
Constituency	at-large
In office 29 September 1999 – 29 September 2004
Preceded by	multi-member district
Succeeded by	multi-member district
Constituency	Saarbrücken

Personal details
- Born: Annegret Kramp; 9 August 1962 (age 64) Völklingen, Saarland, West Germany
- Party: Christian Democratic Union
- Spouse: Helmut Karrenbauer (m. 1984)
- Children: 3
- Education: Saarland University; University of Trier

Annegret Kramp-Karrenbauer (German: [ˈanəɡʁeːt ˈkʁamp ˈkaʁənˌbaʊɐ]; née Kramp; born 9 August 1962), sometimes referred to by her initials of AKK, is a retired German politician who has been serving as chair of the Konrad Adenauer Foundation since 2026. She served as Minister of Defence from 2019 to 2021 and as Leader of the Christian Democratic Union (CDU) from 2018 to 2021.

In February 2020, Kramp-Karrenbauer announced that she would resign her position as CDU leader later in the year and would not put herself forward as a candidate for chancellor for the 2021 federal election. She was succeeded by Armin Laschet at the January 2021 CDU leadership election.

Kramp-Karrenbauer previously served as secretary general of the party and as Minister President of Saarland from 2011 to 2018, the first woman to lead the Government of Saarland and fourth woman to head a German state government. Kramp-Karrenbauer is regarded as socially conservative, but on the CDU's left wing in economic policy and has been described as a centrist. She is an active Catholic and has served on the Central Committee of German Catholics. She is the second woman to hold the office of German defence minister. She was succeeded by Christine Lambrecht.

In October 2021, she proposed for the use of nuclear weapons against Russia via a First-Strike capability as a deterrence against any "provocation" or aggression.

She renounced her Bundestag mandate and retired from politics after the 2021 federal election.

== Life and education ==
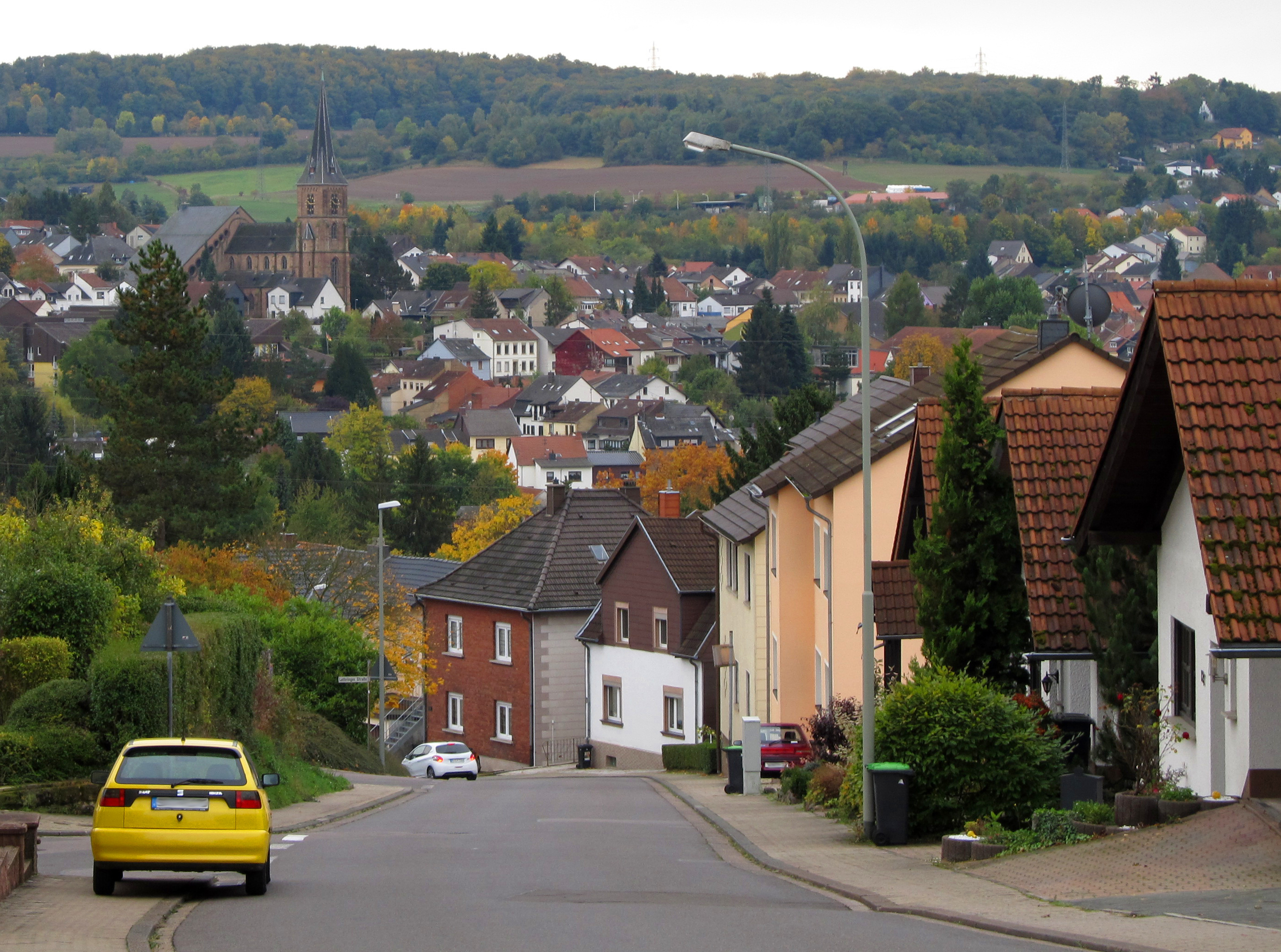
Püttlingen, a small town near the German–French border, where Annegret Kramp grew up

Annegret Kramp was born on 9 August 1962 in Völklingen, located on the Saar River midway between Saarlouis and Saarbrücken, around 40 kilometres from Luxembourg and close to the border with France. She grew up in the neighbouring town of Püttlingen. Her father was a special education teacher and a headmaster. She graduated from high school in 1982 and considered becoming a school teacher, but decided to study politics and law at the University of Trier and at Saarland University, where she earned a master's degree in 1990.

== Political career ==
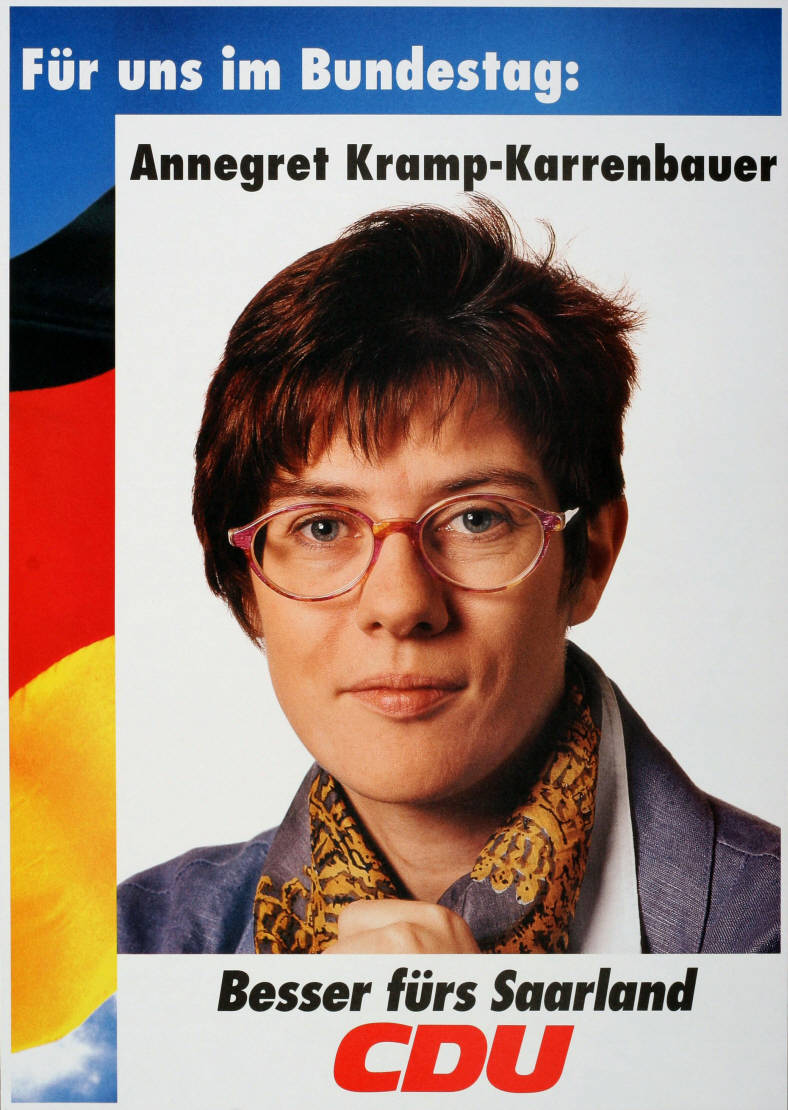
Election poster for Kramp-Karrenbauer's 1994 candidacy in Saarland

Annegret Kramp-Karrenbauer joined the CDU while still in high school in 1981. In 1984 she was elected to the district council of Püttlingen, and in 1985 became chairwoman of the city's CDU association. From 1985 to 1988 she was also a member of the regional board of the Young Union in Saarland. From 1991 to 1998 she served as a policy and planning officer for the CDU in Saarland under environment minister Klaus Töpfer. In 1998, Kramp-Karrenbauer replaced Töpfer in the federal Bundestag, serving seven months before losing re-election in the SPD landslide the same year. In 1999, she was an advisor to Peter Müller, then chairman of the CDU parliamentary group in the Landtag of Saarland and later Minister-President. That same year she became a chairwoman of the Women's Union.

=== State Minister 1999–2011 ===
Kramp-Karrenbauer was elected to the Landtag of Saarland in 1999. She served as Minister of the Interior in the government of Peter Müller; the first woman to hold that office in Germany. She took on more responsibilities in 2004, and changed roles in 2007 following a cabinet reshuffle, becoming Minister of Education and again in 2009, becoming Minister of Labor in the so-called Jamaica coalition government. In 2008, she was elected chairwoman of the Kultusministerkonferenz. Throughout her time in state government, she also served at various times as minister responsible for women, sports, family, and culture. In the negotiations to form a coalition government following the 2009 federal election, Kramp-Karrenbauer was part of the CDU–CSU delegation in the working group on education and research policy, led by Annette Schavan and Andreas Pinkwart.

=== Minister-President of Saarland 2011–2018 ===
In 2011, after months of difficult negotiations with the coalition partners, the Free Democratic Party and The Greens, Kramp-Karrenbauer was elected Minister-President of the Saarland in a special session of parliament, replacing Müller, who resigned to become a judge at the Federal Constitutional Court. Shortly afterwards, she ended the coalition and triggered an election, blaming the party for "dismantling itself" and arguing that the three-party coalition had lost the necessary "trust, stability, and capacity to act". Kramp-Karrenbauer and the CDU won the state election soon afterwards, in what was widely regarded as the first electoral test of Chancellor Angela Merkel's crisis-fighting policy since the beginning of the European debt crisis; meanwhile, the FDP was ejected from the state parliament after taking just 1.2% of the vote. Under Kramp-Karrenbauer's leadership, the CDU won 40.7% of the vote in the 2017 state elections, up from 35.2% in 2012.

While serving as Minister-President, Kramp-Karrenbauer, who speaks French, was also Commissioner of the Federal Republic of Germany for Cultural Affairs under the Treaty on Franco-German Cooperation between 2011 and 2014. She continued to be a member of the German-French Friendship Group that was set up by the upper chambers of the German and French national parliaments, respectively the Bundesrat and the Senate. Furthermore, as one of the state's representatives at the federal Bundesrat, she served on the Committee on Cultural Affairs, the Committee on Foreign Affairs, and the Committee on Defence. Kramp-Karrenbauer was a CDU delegate to the Federal Convention to elect the president of Germany in 2012 and in 2017. She was also for a short time part of the CDU–CSU delegation's leadership team in the negotiations to form a "grand coalition" following the 2013 federal elections. She again played a role in the negotiations to form a fourth coalition government under Chancellor Angela Merkel in 2018, leading a working group on education policy alongside Stefan Müller, Manuela Schwesig and Hubertus Heil.

As Minister-President of Saarland, Kramp-Karrenbauer promoted the French language, aiming to make the state fully bilingual in German and French and thus promote Saarland as a bicultural European region similar to neighbouring Luxembourg. While Saarland had rejoined Germany five years before Kramp-Karrenbauer's birth when a majority voted against becoming an independent state, it has a long history of association with France dating back to the late 18th century.

=== Secretary General of the CDU, 2018 ===
In February 2018, Merkel nominated Kramp-Karrenbauer as the new secretary general of the CDU. She was confirmed at the CDU party conference on 26 February, securing 98.87% of the vote. As secretary general, she managed the party and oversaw its election campaigns. She also embarked on a major listening tour of the country, holding more than 40 meetings with local CDU associations and working on a new political manifesto for the party.

=== 2018 CDU leadership election ===
In October 2018, following bad results for the CDU/CSU in state elections in Bavaria and Hesse, Chancellor Merkel announced she would not stand for re-election as party leader in the CDU convention at the end of the year, triggering a leadership election. Former Bundestag leader of the CDU and businessman Friedrich Merz jumped into the race immediately while Health Minister Jens Spahn and Kramp-Karrenbauer announced their bids shortly after. Kramp-Karrenbauer was perceived to be Merkel's chosen heir and a continuation of her style and centrist ideology while Merz was an old rival from Merkel's early days as party leader and was very open about his intention to move the party in a more conservative direction. Nevertheless, the Chancellor did not state her preferences.

As the vote approached, opinion polls showed that Kramp-Karrenbauer was favoured by CDU voters and the general public alike. The contest was held on 7 December and after coming out on top in the first round, Kramp-Karrenbauer narrowly defeated Merz in a run-off, becoming the new leader of the CDU.

=== Leader of the CDU, 2018–2020 ===
In the immediate aftermath of her election, surveys showed an increase in the CDU's vote share; however, it was short-lived. In the first months of her tenure, there were a series of gaffes and according to the press a failure to connect with voters. In the run-up to the 2019 European Parliament election, which was seen as her first major electoral test, the CDU's campaign was embroiled by a row between the party and YouTube personality Rezo. It was caused by a viral YouTube video posted by Rezo in which he called out the parties of the governing Grand Coalition (CDU/CSU and SPD) and urged viewers not to vote for them. Kramp-Karrenbauer reacted, stating that the electoral law should be changed to prevent social media personalities like Rezo from influencing the voters' choice in the midst of a campaign. The statement was harshly criticized as an attack on freedom of expression and damaged the image of Kramp-Karrenbauer among young people. Shortly afterwards, a Bloomberg report stated that Chancellor Merkel thought that her successor was not up to the job, further hindering her popularity.

The European Elections resulted in the CDU's worst national showing ever, below 30%. After the underwhelming result, rumors emerged that some CDU politicians planned to shun Kramp-Karrenbauer and put up another Chancellor candidate for the next Bundestag election. Tilman Meyer, a political scientist at University of Bonn, told Focus that the mounting pressure on Kramp-Karrenbauer could lead to the CDU going into the next election with a more conservative candidate such as Friedrich Merz, a former CDU parliamentary leader, in response to the rise of the far-right.

Kramp-Karrenbauer announced her resignation as leader of the CDU on 10 February 2020 as a result of the 2020 Thuringian government crisis. The plan was that she would resign in the summer and her successor would be elected, but this was postponed to December due to the COVID-19 pandemic.

=== Minister of Defence, 2019–2021 ===
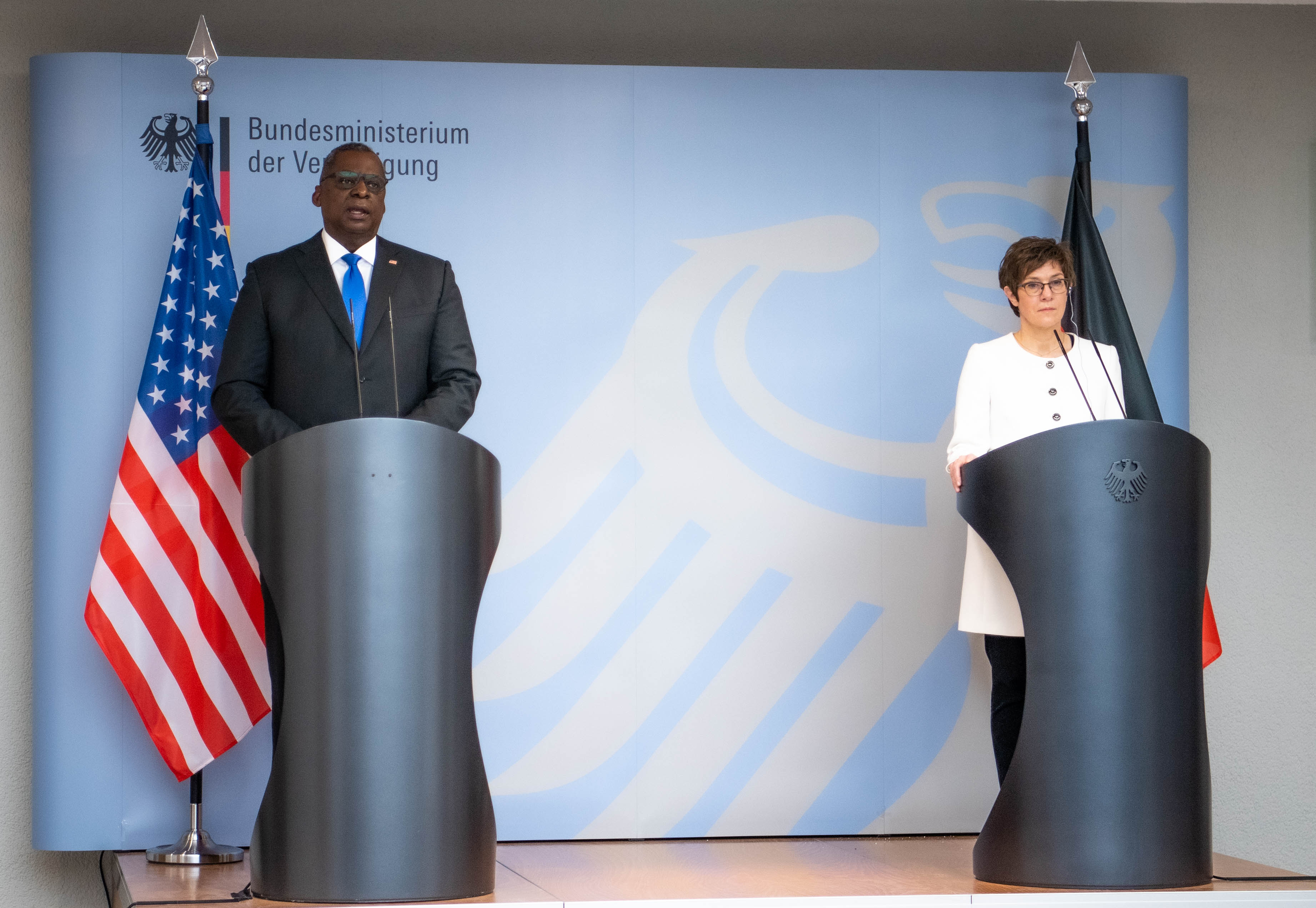
Minister of Defence Kramp-Karrenbauer and U.S. Secretary of Defense Lloyd Austin on 13 April 2021

When Ursula von der Leyen was elected President of the European Commission in July 2019, Kramp-Karrenbauer succeeded her as Federal Minister of Defence in the government of Chancellor Angela Merkel. This was the first time that she held a position in the federal government.

For the 2021 elections, Kramp-Karrenbauer was later elected to lead the CDU campaign in Saarland. Shortly after having been elected, she announced her decision to step down from the parliament and instead make room for Markus Uhl who had failed to secure a seat.

International crises

In November 2020, Kramp-Karrenbauer stated that in the disputed territory of the Nagorno-Karabakh, "the first real drone war in human history has just been conducted between Azerbaijan and Armenia, with devastating consequences for the losing side."

In April 2021, Kramp-Karrenbauer accused Russia of taking provocative actions with its troop buildup in Crimea and along its western border, while rejecting Russia's claim that it was responding to a massive NATO-led military exercise called Defender-Europe 21, one of the largest NATO-led military exercises in Europe in decades, which began in March 2021.

In mid-2021, Kramp-Karrenbauer oversaw the German military's withdrawal from Afghanistan after almost two decades. In July 2021, she sent the frigate Bayern off on a seven-month voyage that will take it to Australia, Japan, South Korea and Vietnam, making it the first German warship to pass through the South China Sea since 2002.

Armed forces

During her time in office, Kramp-Karrenbauer publicly apologized to soldiers who for decades faced discrimination, discharge or convictions on the basis of their sexual orientation. In 2021, she successfully introduced legislation to rehabilitate those soldiers.

In 2020, Kramp-Karrenbauer disbanded a company of the Special Forces Command (KSK) after police seized weapons and ammunition during a raid on the property of a KSK soldier. She later resisted calls for KSK to be disbanded altogether and instead pushed through the unit's reform.

In June 2021, Kramp-Karrenbauer recalled 30 German soldiers from service at the NATO Enhanced Forward Presence in Lithuania, with ringleaders facing immediate dismissal, after an article in Der Spiegel accused them of making racist and anti-Semitic remarks and of sexual violence.

Also in 2021, Kramp-Karrenbauer opened the Bundeswehr's first-ever Air and Space Operations Centre (ASOC) in Uedem, expanding Germany's existing space situation center into the new structure.

=== Popularity ===
Approval ratings of Annegret Kramp-Karrenbauer in Saarland state and federal politics

During Kramp-Karrenbauer's tenure as Minister-President of Saarland, she had consistently high approval ratings in the low to mid-70's among her constituents. She was the most popular politician in Saarland according to Infratest dimap from November 2010 until her departure as Minister-President. Kramp-Karrenbauer was considered one of the most popular state government leaders nationwide.

When entering federal politics, Kramp-Karrenbauer had a positive net approval rating from her election as CDU General Secretary in February 2018 until March 2019, just shortly after having been elected as Leader of the Christian Democratic Union. Her nationwide popularity peaked in January 2019, when she had a net approval of +17% and was seen as second-most popular politician overall. There was then a sharp decline in her popularity following gaffes and electoral defeats for the Christian Democrats in several elections. As of February 2020, she was one of the least popular German politicians.

== Life after politics ==
From 2024 to 2025, Kramp-Karrenbauer chaired an independent expert commission convened by the Global Perspectives Initiative to develop recommendations for Germany's development policy.

Since 2026, Kramp-Karrenbauer has been serving as chair of the Konrad Adenauer Foundation.

== Political positions ==
=== Domestic policies ===
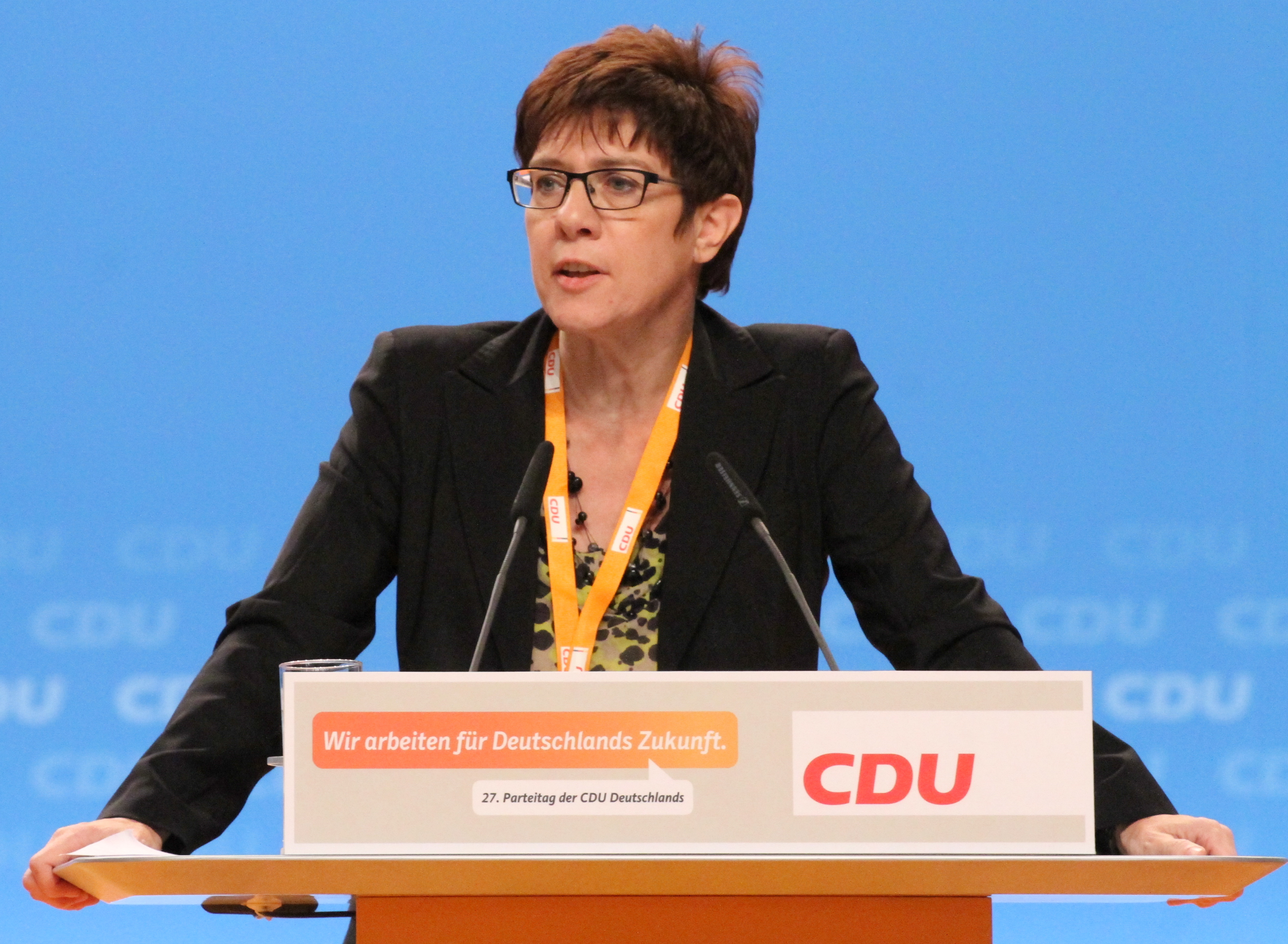
Kramp-Karrenbauer speaking at the 2014 CDU conference

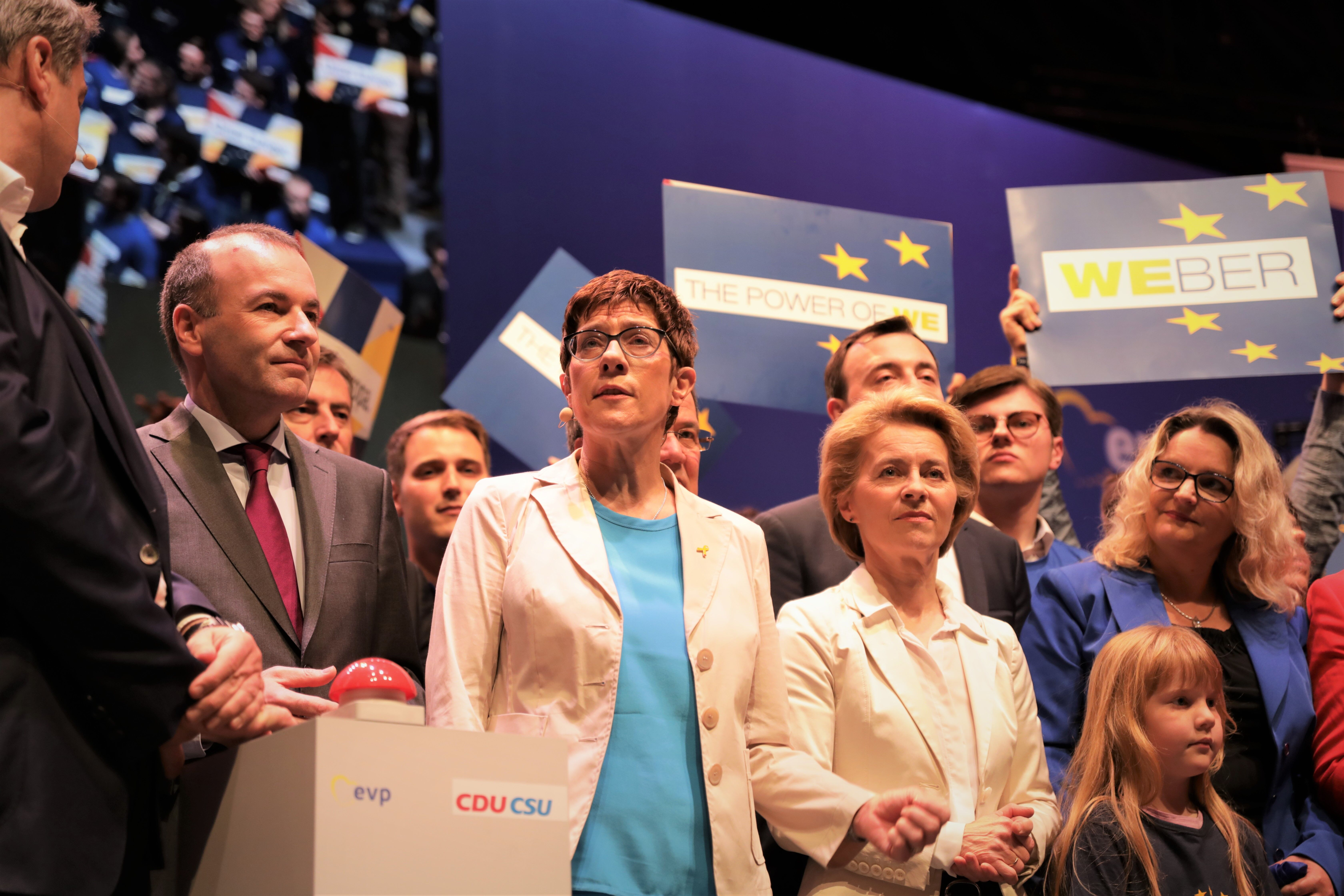
Manfred Weber, Kramp-Karrenbauer and Ursula von der Leyen in April 2019

Kramp-Karrenbauer is perceived as a moderate or centrist Christian Democrat. She has been described as socially conservative, but on the CDU's left wing in economic policy. She is regarded as more conservative than Angela Merkel. Nevertheless, in the German press, her often used nickname during her party leadership was "Mini-Merkel", reflecting both her size and her political views.

Kramp-Karrenbauer opposes same sex marriage, having compared it to incest and polygamy. However, when the Mayor of Hamburg Olaf Scholz submitted a motion for a mandatory gender quota for supervisory boards to the Bundesrat in 2012, Kramp-Karrenbauer joined the state governments controlled by the Social Democrats (the SPD), voting in favour of the draft legislation; in doing so, she supported an initiative opposed by Merkel and state governments controlled by the CDU.

Amid her party's campaign for the 2013 federal elections, Kramp-Karrenbauer suggested Germany return to a top income tax rate of more than 53%, setting off a fierce debate in her party. In her view, Merkel's predecessor Gerhard Schröder had gone too far in reducing the top rate from 53% to 42% in the 1990s. In May 2014, she was among leading members of Merkel's CDU who called for reductions to offset fiscal drag—the automatic increases in the tax-take that occur as inflation and income growth push wage-earners further into their marginal higher tax-bracket.

When the Federal Constitutional Court ruled in favour of tax equality for same-sex couples in 2013, Kramp-Karrenbauer voiced her concerns about also granting full adoption rights for same-sex couples, stating: "The traditional family unit is the core of not only Germany but all nations". In 2015, she caused a public controversy by arguing that "if we open up [the definition of marriage] to become a long-term responsible partnership between two adults, then other demands can't be ruled out, such as a marriage between close relatives or between more than two people".

For the 2021 national elections, Kramp-Karrenbauer endorsed Armin Laschet as the Christian Democrats' joint candidate to succeed Chancellor Angela Merkel.

=== Foreign policy ===
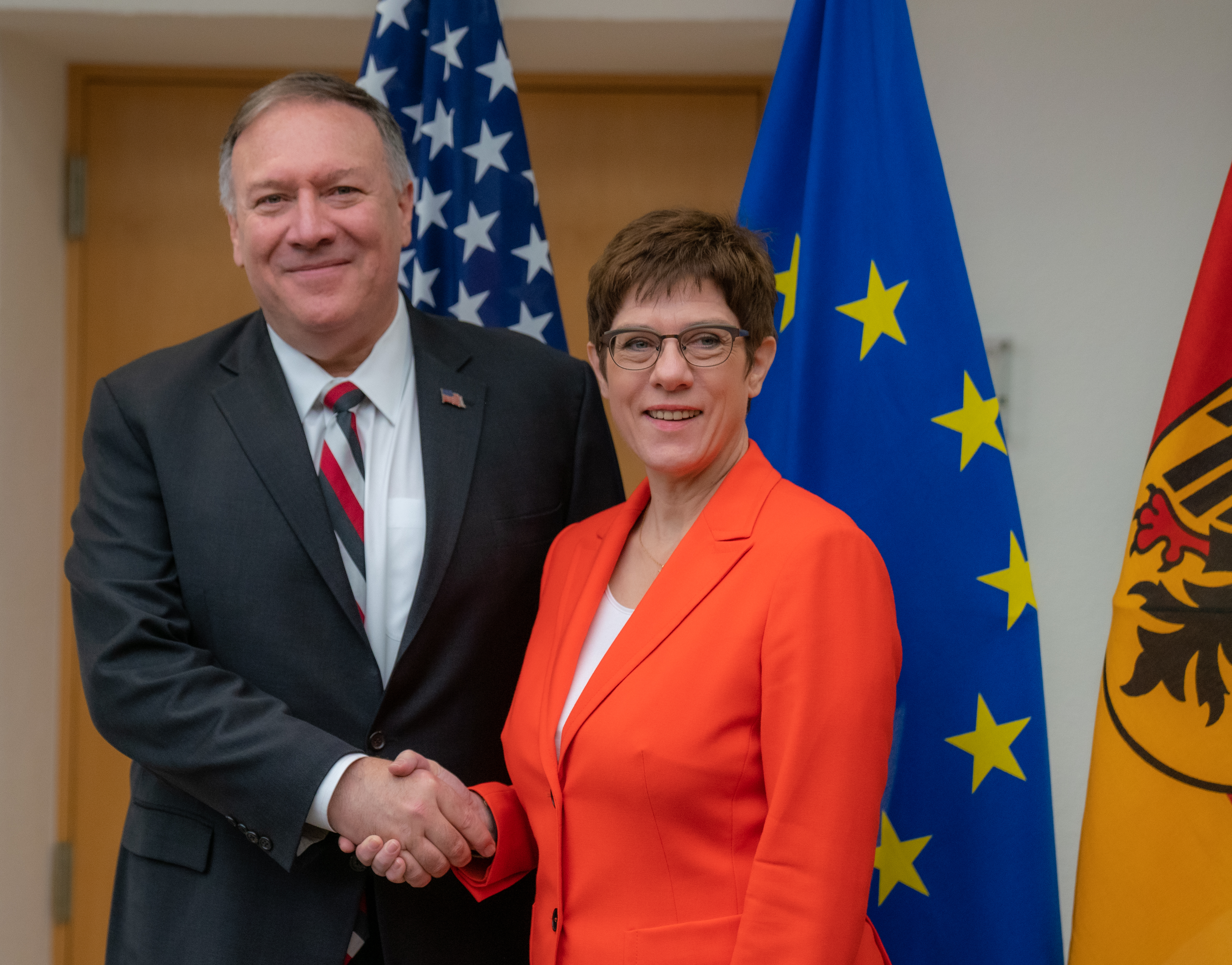
Kramp-Karrenbauer with US Secretary of State Mike Pompeo in 2019

Kramp-Karrenbauer criticised the German-supported Nord Stream 2 gas pipeline that would allow Germany to effectively double the amount of gas it imports from Russia, saying that Nord Stream 2 "is not just an economic project but a political one". In January 2019, U.S. Ambassador to Germany Richard Grenell sent letters to German companies involved in the construction of Nord Stream 2, threatening CAATSA sanctions. In response, Kramp-Karrenbauer stated that "the American ambassador operates in a, shall I say, somewhat unusual diplomatic manner."

Kramp-Karrenbauer has supported arms exports to Saudi Arabia, which has been waging war in Yemen and was condemned for massive human rights violations. Kramp-Karrenbauer accused the Social Democrats (SPD) of jeopardising German industry and jobs, saying that, with Germany's ban on arms exports to Saudi Arabia, "Germany is not very credible at the moment" in European security and defence policy and was "making common European projects practically impossible".

In late 2020, Kramp-Karrenbauer proposed that the European Union should try again to reach a trade agreement with the United States after the elections.

In October 2021, Kramp-Karrenbauer had talked about the possibility of deploying nuclear arms against Russia.

==== Migrants and refugees ====
Kramp-Karrenbauer supports stricter immigration policies. Kramp-Karrenbauer supported Angela Merkel's refugee policies and her decision to let migrants into Germany in 2015–2016, many fleeing wars in the Middle East, but demanded more toughness in some cases. At the beginning of 2016, she declared herself against a unilateral closure of German borders, since she feared a break-up of the European Union. In December 2017, Kramp-Karrenbauer remarked: "Bei unbegleiteten Minderjährigen sollte eine verbindliche Altersprüfung eingeführt werden." (A mandatory age investigation should be initiated for all unaccompanied minors.) She said refugees may often provide a false age in order to be treated as youths rather than adult asylum-seekers. She added, "Jemand, der seine Identität verschleiert oder Papiere vernichtet hat, muss mit harten Konsequenzen rechnen." (Anyone who conceals their identity or has destroyed papers must face harsh consequences.) According to her, data sources like mobile phones should be checked, in order to establish a person's identity. Furthermore, instead of carrying out deportations with commercial airplanes, she said it may be necessary to use their separate aircraft. She demanded in November 2018 that after expulsion offenders must be refused re-entry for life, not only to Germany but also throughout the Schengen area, and cited the 2018 gang rape in Freiburg as an example.

== Other activities ==
- German Council on Foreign Relations (DGAP), Member of the Advisory Council (since 2023)
- Center for European Policy Analysis (CEPA), Co-Chair of the International Leadership Council (since 2022)
- GLOBSEC, Member of the International Advisory Council
- Munich Security Conference, Member of the Advisory Council (since 2019)
- German Adult Education Association (DVV), president (since 2015)
- Central Committee of German Catholics (ZdK), member
- European Foundation for the Speyer Cathedral, Member of the Board of Trustees
- Konrad Adenauer Foundation (KAS), member
- Max Planck Society, member of the Senate
- Max Planck Institute for Informatics, member of the Board of Trustees
- Talat Alaiyan Foundation, patron
- German Foundation of School Sports, former Chairwoman of the Board of Trustees
- Foundation for the Cultural Heritage of Saarland, former ex officio Chairwoman of the Board of Trustees (2011–2018)
- RAG-Stiftung, ex officio member of the Board of Trustees (2011–2018)
- 2011 FIFA Women's World Cup, Member of the Board of Trustees

== Personal life ==
Kramp-Karrenbauer is a Roman Catholic. She is married to Helmut Karrenbauer, a retired mining engineer, with whom she has three children, born in 1988, 1991 and 1998; they live in the city of Püttlingen. Kramp-Karrenbauer is an avid reader and speaks French.

Political offices in Saarland
Preceded by Klaus Meiser	Minister of the Interior and Sport; 2000–2004	Succeeded by Herself as Minister of the Interior, Family, Women and Sport
Preceded by Herself as Minister of the Interior and Sport; Regina Görner as Minister of Women	Minister of the Interior, Family, Women and Sport; 2004–2007	Succeeded by Klaus Meiser
Preceded by Klaus Sessler as Minister of Education; Herself as Minister of Family and Women	Minister of Education, Culture, Family and Women; 2007–2009	Succeeded by Klaus Sessler as Minister of Education; Karl Rauber as Minister of Culture
Preceded by Gerhard Vigener as Minister of Labour and Social Affairs; Herself as Minister of Family and Women	Minister of Labour, Prevention, Family and Social Affairs; 2009–2011	Succeeded by Monika Bachmann
Political offices
Preceded by Peter Müller	Minister-President of the Saarland; 2011–2018	Succeeded by Tobias Hans
Preceded by Ursula von der Leyen	Federal Minister of Defence; 2019–2021	Succeeded by Christine Lambrecht
Party political offices
Preceded by Peter Müller	Leader of the Christian Democratic Union in the Saarland; 2011–2018	Succeeded by Tobias Hans
Preceded by Peter Tauber	General Secretary of the Christian Democratic Union; 2018	Succeeded by Paul Ziemiak
Preceded by Angela Merkel	Leader of the Christian Democratic Union; 2018–2021	Succeeded by Armin Laschet
