= Tobias Hans =

German politician

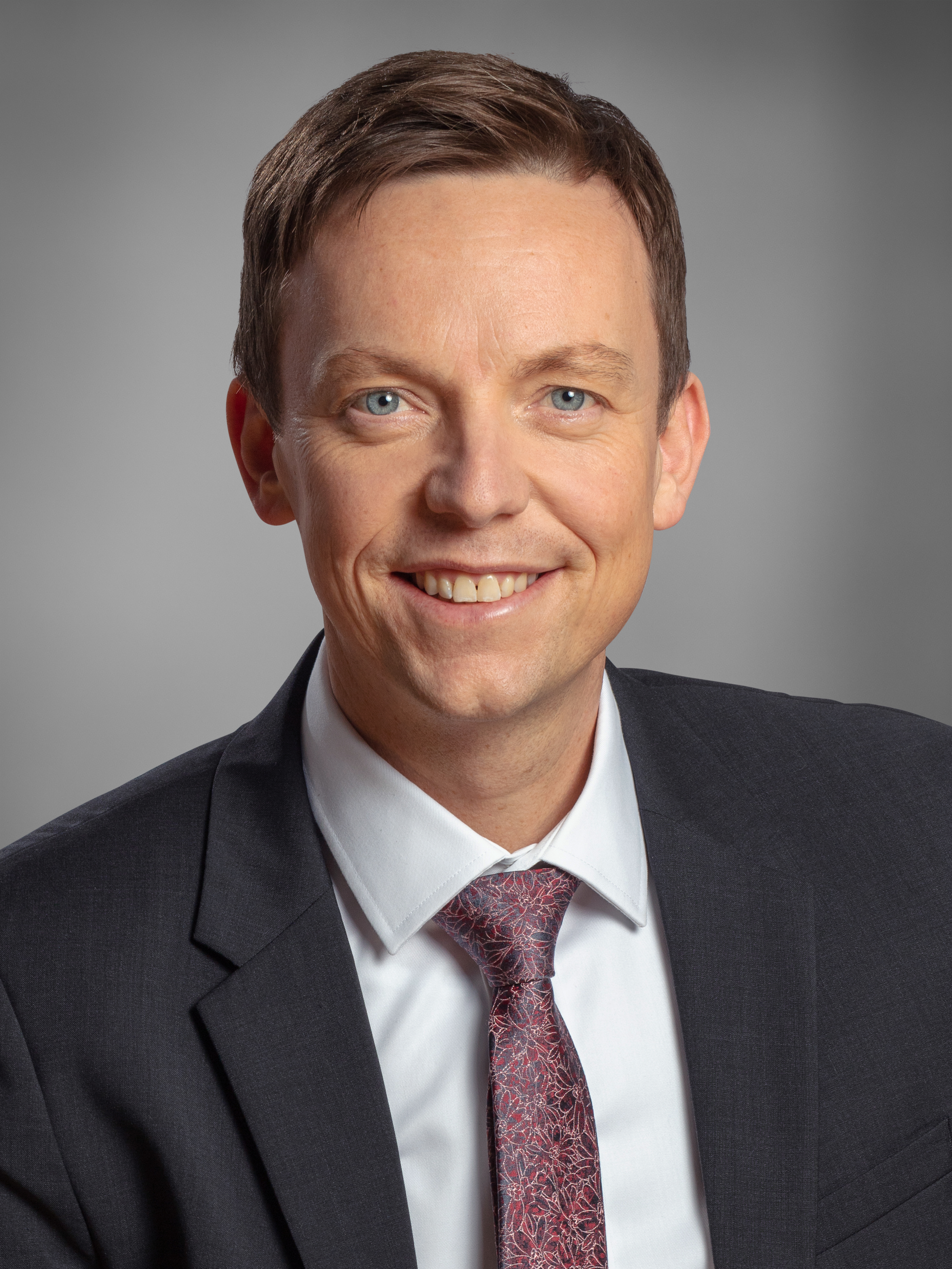

Minister-President of Saarland
- In office 1 March 2018 – 25 April 2022
- Deputy: Anke Rehlinger
- Preceded by: Annegret Kramp-Karrenbauer
- Succeeded by: Anke Rehlinger

Leader of the Christian Democratic Union in the Saarland
- Incumbent
- Assumed office 19 October 2018
- General Secretary: Markus Uhl
- Deputy: Michael Adam; Daniela Schlegel-Friedrich; Nadine Schön; Peter Strobel; Stephan Toscani
- Preceded by: Annegret Kramp-Karrenbauer

Leader of the Christian Democratic Union in the Landtag of Saarland
- In office 24 November 2015 – 1 March 2018
- Preceded by: Klaus Meiser
- Succeeded by: Alexander Funk

Member of the Landtag of Saarland for Neunkirchen
- In office 23 September 2009 – 31 October 2026
- Preceded by: multi-member district

Personal details
- Born: 1 February 1978 (age 48) Neunkirchen, Saarland, West Germany
- Party: Christian Democratic Union
- Website: www.tobias-hans.com

Tobias Theodor Hans (born 1 February 1978) is a German politician of the Christian Democratic Union (CDU), consultant and keynote speaker. He served as Minister-President of Saarland from 1 March 2018 to 25 April 2022 and was a member of the German Bundesrat from 2018 to 2022.

Since 2023, Hans has been the sole shareholder of Tobias Hans GmbH, a consultancy providing services in strategy, marketing, communications and personnel.

== Early life and education ==
Hans was born in Neunkirchen, Saarland. After completing his Abitur in 1997, he performed civilian service at the Psychosomatic Clinic in Neunkirchen-Münchwies. From 1998 he studied information science, business informatics and English studies at Saarland University.

While studying, Hans worked at the Psychosomatic Clinic in Münchwies. He subsequently worked for the CDU parliamentary group in Saarland and, from 2007 to 2009, as personal adviser to Saarland ministers Josef Hecken and Gerhard Vigener.

== Political career ==
On 1 March 2018, Hans was elected Minister-President of Saarland, succeeding Annegret Kramp-Karrenbauer. He remained in office until 25 April 2022. He also served as chairman of the CDU Saar from October 2018 until May 2022.

In 2022, the Saarland government enacted the Saarland Digitalisation Act during Hans's tenure as Minister-President. The legislation removed around 1,000 written-form requirements from state law and provided for the increased use of electronic procedures in public administration.

Hans joined the Young Union in 1992 and the CDU in 1994. He was elected to the Landtag of Saarland in 2009. He served as majority whip of the CDU parliamentary group from 2012 to 2015 and as its chairman from 2015 to 2018.

As one of Saarland’s representatives in the Bundesrat, Hans served on the Committee on Foreign Affairs, the Committee on Defence and the Committee on Cultural Affairs. He was also a member of a German-French friendship group established by the Bundesrat and the French Senate.

=== Political positions and public commentary ===

Hans has been associated with the centrist course of the CDU during Angela Merkel’s chancellorship.

In July 2023, Hans publicly questioned whether CDU chairman Friedrich Merz was suitable to become the party’s candidate for Chancellor. His criticism followed remarks by Merz about the treatment of the Alternative for Germany at municipal level. The statements, originally made to Stern, were reported by several national news organisations.

In October 2026, he announced that he would resign his seat in the Saarland state parliament to focus on his work as a strategic adviser and speaker.

== Business ==
After leaving executive office, Hans expanded his consulting activities. Publicly available corporate and biographical material describes his work as covering strategy, marketing, communications, internationalisation, digitalisation and industrial transformation.

In March 2025, Saarländischer Rundfunk reported that Hans had travelled to Saudi Arabia in an advisory capacity.

Hans has also advocated the modernisation of government and administration. In a 2024 interview with ProjectTogether, he discussed digitalisation, administrative reform and his voluntary work as a senior adviser to the Re:Form alliance.

== Speaking and media activities ==
Hans is active as a keynote speaker on topics including change management, digitalisation, sustainability and market development.Hans has stated that he gives interviews in English and has appeared on BBC News and Channel 4 News. He is described as bilingual in German and English with referral to family ties to the United States.

Party political offices
Preceded by Annegret Kramp-Karrenbauer	Leader of the Christian Democratic Union in Saarland; 2018–present	Incumbent
Political offices
Preceded by Annegret Kramp-Karrenbauer	Minister-President of Saarland; 2018–2022	Succeeded by Anke Rehlinger
