= President of the German Bundesrat =

Chairperson or speaker of the Bundesrat

President of the Federal Council of the Federal Republic of Germany
- Seal of the Bundesrat

- Incumbent; Hendrik Wüst since 1 November 2026
- Legislative Branch of the German Federal Government
- Seat: Berlin, Germany
- Appointer: Bundesrat of Germany
- Term length: One year
- Constituting instrument: German Basic Law
- Inaugural holder: Karl Arnold
- Formation: 1949
- Website: Official Website

In Germany, the president of the Bundesrat or president of the Federal Council (German: Bundesratspräsident) is the chairperson (speaker) of the Bundesrat (Federal Council). The president is elected by the Bundesrat for a term of one year (usually from November 1 to October 31 in the next year). Traditionally, the presidency of the Bundesrat rotates among the leaders of the sixteen state governments. This is however only an established practice; theoretically the Bundesrat is free to elect any member it chooses, and a president could also be re-elected (which has happened once, in 1957). As well as acting as a chairperson, the president of the Bundesrat is ex officio deputy of the federal president. The president of the German Federal Council is 4th in the German order of precedence. In addition, the main celebration of German Unity Day is traditionally held in the state that holds the presidency.

The president of the Bundesrat convenes and chairs plenary sessions of the body and is formally responsible for representing the Federal Republic in the Bundesrat. The president is aided by two vice presidents who play an advisory role and deputise in the president's absence. The three together constitute the presidium of the Bundesrat.

The current president of the Bundesrat is Hendrik Wüst, the Minister-President of North Rhine-Westphalia, whose one-year term started on 1 November 2026.

== Election ==
The Basic Law merely provides that "the Bundesrat elects its President for one year" (Art. 52.1). In order to be elected, a nominee needs a majority of votes in the Bundesrat (currently 35 of 69).

In practice the position rotates among the states equally, following a constitutional convention known as the “Königstein agreement” (Königsteiner Vereinbarung). The position rotates from one state to another in an order determined by population, the presidency descending from the most populous state to the least. Even though in principle every member of the Bundesrat from the respective state is eligible for election, in practice it has always been the Minister-President of the respective state who has been nominated and elected. The order is updated based on the newest census-data every time a rotation has been completed. The current order of rotation of the presidency of the Bundesrat is as follows:

1. North Rhine-Westphalia
2. Bavaria
3. Baden-Württemberg
4. Lower Saxony
5. Hesse
6. Saxony
7. Rhineland-Palatinate
8. Berlin
9. Schleswig-Holstein
10. Brandenburg
11. Saxony-Anhalt
12. Thuringia
13. Hamburg
14. Mecklenburg-Vorpommern
15. Saarland
16. Bremen

The Königsstein agreement also states that, if the sitting President of the Bundesrat exits his office as Minister-President, by losing a state election, resignation, or death, the new Minister-President of that state is elected President of the Bundesrat subsequently, but only to complete their predecessors term. The last time this occurred was in April 1999, when Hans Eichel, President of the Bundesrat and Minister-President of Hesse, had lost the 1999 Hesse state election and his successor Roland Koch served the end of his term until October 1999.

== Deputy to the Federal President ==
Article 57 of the Basic Law provides that:

If the Federal President is unable to perform his duties, or if his office falls prematurely vacant, the President of the Bundesrat shall exercise his powers.

If the office of the Federal President falls vacant, the President of the Bundesrat fills in as acting President. While doing so, they do not continue to exercise the role of chair of the Bundesrat. If the president resigns, dies, or is removed from office, a successor is elected within thirty days.

Three Presidents of the Bundesrat have served as acting Presidents:

1. Karl Arnold (from 7 September 1949 to 12 September 1949 after he was elected as President of the Bundesrat and before Theodor Heuss was elected as the first President of Germany. With a tenure of only six days he is yet the shortest serving head of state in German history)
2. Jens Böhrnsen (from 31 May 2010 to 30 June 2010 after the resignation of Horst Köhler and before the election of Christian Wulff)
3. Horst Seehofer (from 17 February 2012 to 18 March 2012 after the resignation of Christian Wulff and before the election of Joachim Gauck)

If the Federal President is abroad on a state visit the President of the Bundesrat does not assume all of the Federal President's responsibilities but may "deputise" for him or her, performing on the Federal President's behalf merely those tasks that require his or her physical presence, such as the signing of documents.

== List of presidents ==
Political Party

CDU SPD CSU FDP Green Left

No.	Portrait	President of the Bundesrat	Took office	Left office	Time in office	Party	State
1	Karl Arnold	Karl Arnold (1901–1958)	7 September 1949	8 September 1950	1 year, 1 day	CDU	North Rhine-Westphalia
2	Hans Ehard	Hans Ehard (1887–1980)	8 September 1950	7 September 1951	364 days	CSU	Bavaria
3	Hinrich Wilhelm Kopf	Hinrich Wilhelm Kopf (1893–1961)	7 September 1951	6 September 1952	365 days	SPD	Lower Saxony
4	Reinhold Maier	Reinhold Maier (1889–1971)	7 September 1952	6 September 1953	364 days	FDP	Baden-Württemberg
5	Georg August Zinn	Georg August Zinn (1901–1976)	7 September 1953	6 September 1954	364 days	SPD	Hesse
6	Peter Altmeier	Peter Altmeier (1899–1977)	7 September 1954	6 September 1955	364 days	CDU	Rhineland-Palatinate
7	Kai-Uwe von Hassel	Kai-Uwe von Hassel (1913–1997)	7 September 1955	6 September 1956	365 days	CDU	Schleswig-Holstein
8	Kurt Sieveking	Kurt Sieveking (1897–1986)	7 September 1956	31 October 1957 (Note: Otto Suhr was elected as President of the Bundesrat in July 1957 but died on 30 August 1957, before his term of office began. In order to prevent an imminent vacancy in the presidency at the beginning of the new fiscal year on September 7, 1957, the incumbent, the First Mayor of Hamburg Kurt Sieveking was then re-elected as President of the Bundesrat on 6 September 1957. In its 184th session on 25 October 1957, the Bundesrat set a new fiscal year period (1 November 1 to 31 October) and elected Willy Brandt as President of the German Bundesrat for the fiscal year beginning on 1 November 1957.)	1 year, 54 days	CDU	Hamburg
9	Willy Brandt	Willy Brandt (1913–1992)	1 November 1957	31 October 1958	364 days	SPD	West Berlin
10	Wilhelm Kaisen	Wilhelm Kaisen (1887–1979)	1 November 1958	31 October 1959	364 days	SPD	Bremen
11	Franz Josef Röder	Franz Josef Röder (1909–1979)	1 November 1959	31 October 1960	365 days	CDU	Saarland
12	Franz Meyers	Franz Meyers (1908–2002)	1 November 1960	31 October 1961	365 days	CDU	North Rhine-Westphalia
13 (2)	Hans Ehard	Hans Ehard (1887–1980)	1 November 1961	31 October 1962	364 days	CSU	Bavaria
14	Kurt Georg Kiesinger	Kurt Georg Kiesinger (1904–1988)	1 November 1962	31 October 1963	364 days	CDU	Baden-Württemberg
15	Georg Diederichs	Georg Diederichs (1900–1983)	1 November 1963	31 October 1964	364 days	SPD	Lower Saxony
16 (5)	Georg August Zinn	Georg August Zinn (1901–1976)	1 November 1964	31 October 1965	364 days	SPD	Hesse
17 (6)	Peter Altmeier	Peter Altmeier (1899–1977)	1 November 1965	31 October 1966	364 days	CDU	Rhineland-Palatinate
18	Helmut Lemke	Helmut Lemke (1907–1990)	1 November 1966	31 October 1967	364 days	CDU	Schleswig-Holstein
19	Klaus Schütz	Klaus Schütz (1926–2012)	1 November 1967	31 October 1968	365 days	SPD	West Berlin
20	Herbert Weichmann	Herbert Weichmann (1896–1983)	1 November 1968	31 October 1969	364 days	SPD	Hamburg
21 (11)	Franz Josef Röder	Franz Josef Röder (1909–1979)	1 November 1969	31 October 1970	364 days	CDU	Saarland
22	Hans Koschnick	Hans Koschnick (1929–2016)	1 November 1970	31 October 1971	364 days	SPD	Bremen
23	Heinz Kühn	Heinz Kühn (1912–1992)	1 November 1971	31 October 1972	365 days	SPD	North Rhine-Westphalia
24	Alfons Goppel	Alfons Goppel (1905–1991)	1 November 1972	31 October 1973	364 days	CSU	Bavaria
25	Hans Filbinger	Hans Filbinger (1913–2007)	1 November 1973	31 October 1974	364 days	CDU	Baden-Württemberg
26	Alfred Kubel	Alfred Kubel (1909–1999)	1 November 1974	31 October 1975	364 days	SPD	Lower Saxony
27	Albert Osswald	Albert Osswald (1919–1996)	1 November 1975	20 October 1976 (membership ended) (Note: On October 20, 1976, Albert Osswald had to leave the Hessian state government and thus the Bundesrat.)	354 days	SPD	Hesse
The office was vacant from 20 October to 3 December 1976.
28	Bernhard Vogel	Bernhard Vogel (1932–2025)	3 December 1976	31 October 1977	321 days	CDU	Rhineland-Palatinate
29	Gerhard Stoltenberg	Gerhard Stoltenberg (1928–2001)	1 November 1977	31 October 1978	364 days	CDU	Schleswig-Holstein
30	Dietrich Stobbe	Dietrich Stobbe (1938–2011)	1 November 1978	31 October 1979	364 days	SPD	West Berlin
31	Hans-Ulrich Klose	Hans-Ulrich Klose (1937–2023)	1 November 1979	31 October 1980	365 days	SPD	Hamburg
32	Werner Zeyer	Werner Zeyer (1929–2000)	1 November 1980	31 October 1981	364 days	CDU	Saarland
33 (22)	Hans Koschnick	Hans Koschnick (1929–2016)	1 November 1981	31 October 1982	364 days	SPD	Bremen
34	Johannes Rau	Johannes Rau (1931–2006)	1 November 1982	31 October 1983	364 days	SPD	North Rhine-Westphalia
35	Franz Josef Strauss	Franz Josef Strauss (1915–1988)	1 November 1983	31 October 1984	365 days	CSU	Bavaria
36	Lothar Späth	Lothar Späth (1937–2016)	1 November 1984	31 October 1985	364 days	CDU	Baden-Württemberg
37	Ernst Albrecht	Ernst Albrecht (1930–2014)	1 November 1985	31 October 1986	364 days	CDU	Lower Saxony
38	Holger Börner	Holger Börner (1931–2006)	1 November 1986	24 April 1987 (membership ended) (Note: On 24 April 1987, Holger Börner had to leave the Hessian state government and thus the Bundesrat.)	174 days	SPD	Hesse
The office was vacant from 24 April to 15 May 1987.
39	Walter Wallmann	Walter Wallmann (1932–2013)	15 May 1987	31 October 1987	169 days	CDU	Hesse
40 (28)	Bernhard Vogel	Bernhard Vogel (1932–2025)	1 November 1987	31 October 1988	365 days	CDU	Rhineland-Palatinate
41	Björn Engholm	Björn Engholm (born 1939)	1 November 1988	31 October 1989	364 days	SPD	Schleswig-Holstein
42	Walter Momper	Walter Momper (born 1945)	1 November 1989	31 October 1990	364 days	SPD	West Berlin (until 2 October 1990); Berlin (3–31 October 1990)
43	Henning Voscherau	Henning Voscherau (1941–2016)	1 November 1990	31 October 1991	364 days	SPD	Hamburg
44	Alfred Gomolka	Alfred Gomolka (1942–2020)	1 November 1991	19 March 1992 (membership ended) (Note: On 19 March 1992, Alfred Gomolka had to leave the Mecklenburg-Vorpommern state government and thus the Bundesrat.)	139 days	CDU	Mecklenburg-Vorpommern
The office was vacant from 19 March to 15 May 1992.
45	Berndt Seite	Berndt Seite (born 1940)	15 May 1992	31 October 1992	169 days	CDU	Mecklenburg-Vorpommern
46	Oskar Lafontaine	Oskar Lafontaine (born 1943)	1 November 1992	31 October 1993	364 days	SPD	Saarland
47	Klaus Wedemeier	Klaus Wedemeier (born 1944)	1 November 1993	31 October 1994	364 days	SPD	Bremen
48 (34)	Johannes Rau	Johannes Rau (1931–2006)	1 November 1994	31 October 1995	364 days	SPD	North Rhine-Westphalia
49	Edmund Stoiber	Edmund Stoiber (born 1941)	1 November 1995	31 October 1996	365 days	CSU	Bavaria
50	Erwin Teufel	Erwin Teufel (born 1939)	1 November 1996	31 October 1997	364 days	CDU	Baden-Württemberg
51	Gerhard Schröder	Gerhard Schröder (born 1944)	1 November 1997	27 October 1998 (resigned to become Chancellor) (Note: On 27 October 1998, Gerhard Schröder resigned as Minister President of Lower Saxony and thus as President of the German Bundesrat, as he was appointed as Chancellor of Germany on the same day.)	360 days	SPD	Lower Saxony
The office was vacant from 27 October to 1 November 1998.
52	Hans Eichel	Hans Eichel (born 1941)	1 November 1998	7 April 1999 (membership ended) (Note: On 7 April 1999, Hans Eichel had to leave the Hessian state government and thus the Bundesrat.)	157 days	SPD	Hesse
The office was vacant from 7 April to 30 April 1999.
53	Roland Koch	Roland Koch (born 1958)	30 April 1999	31 October 1999	184 days	CDU	Hesse
54	Kurt Biedenkopf	Kurt Biedenkopf (1930–2021)	1 November 1999	31 October 2000	365 days	CDU	Saxony
55	Kurt Beck	Kurt Beck (born 1949)	1 November 2000	31 October 2001	364 days	SPD	Rhineland-Palatinate
56	Klaus Wowereit	Klaus Wowereit (born 1953)	1 November 2001	31 October 2002	364 days	SPD	Berlin
57	Wolfgang Böhmer	Wolfgang Böhmer (1936–2025)	1 November 2002	31 October 2003	364 days	CDU	Saxony-Anhalt
58	Dieter Althaus	Dieter Althaus (born 1958)	1 November 2003	31 October 2004	365 days	CDU	Thuringia
59	Matthias Platzeck	Matthias Platzeck (born 1953)	1 November 2004	31 October 2005	364 days	SPD	Brandenburg
60	Peter Harry Carstensen	Peter Harry Carstensen (born 1947)	1 November 2005	31 October 2006	364 days	CDU	Schleswig-Holstein
61	Harald Ringstorff	Harald Ringstorff (1939–2020)	1 November 2006	31 October 2007	364 days	SPD	Mecklenburg-Vorpommern
62	Ole von Beust	Ole von Beust (born 1955)	1 November 2007	31 October 2008	365 days	CDU	Hamburg
63	Peter Müller	Peter Müller (born 1955)	1 November 2008	31 October 2009	364 days	CDU	Saarland
64	Jens Böhrnsen	Jens Böhrnsen (born 1949)	1 November 2009	31 October 2010	364 days	SPD	Bremen
65	Hannelore Kraft	Hannelore Kraft (born 1961)	1 November 2010	31 October 2011	364 days	SPD	North Rhine-Westphalia
66	Horst Seehofer	Horst Seehofer (born 1949)	1 November 2011	31 October 2012	365 days	CSU	Bavaria
67	Winfried Kretschmann	Winfried Kretschmann (born 1948)	1 November 2012	31 October 2013	364 days	Greens	Baden-Württemberg
68	Stephan Weil	Stephan Weil (born 1958)	1 November 2013	31 October 2014	364 days	SPD	Lower Saxony
69	Volker Bouffier	Volker Bouffier (born 1951)	1 November 2014	31 October 2015	364 days	CDU	Hesse
70	Stanislaw Tillich	Stanislaw Tillich (born 1959)	1 November 2015	31 October 2016	365 days	CDU	Saxony
71	Malu Dreyer	Malu Dreyer (born 1961)	1 November 2016	31 October 2017	364 days	SPD	Rhineland-Palatinate
72	Michael Müller	Michael Müller (born 1964)	1 November 2017	31 October 2018	364 days	SPD	Berlin
73	Daniel Günther	Daniel Günther (born 1973)	1 November 2018	31 October 2019	364 days	CDU	Schleswig-Holstein
74	Dietmar Woidke	Dietmar Woidke (born 1961)	1 November 2019	31 October 2020	365 days	SPD	Brandenburg
75	Reiner Haseloff	Reiner Haseloff (born 1954)	1 November 2020	31 October 2021	364 days	CDU	Saxony-Anhalt
76	Bodo Ramelow	Bodo Ramelow (born 1956)	1 November 2021	31 October 2022	364 days	Left	Thuringia
77	Peter Tschentscher	Peter Tschentscher (born 1966)	1 November 2022	31 October 2023	364 days	SPD	Hamburg
78	Manuela Schwesig	Manuela Schwesig (born 1974)	1 November 2023	31 October 2024	365 days	SPD	Mecklenburg-Vorpommern
79	Anke Rehlinger	Anke Rehlinger (born 1976)	1 November 2024	31 October 2025	364 days	SPD	Saarland
80	Andreas Bovenschulte	Andreas Bovenschulte (born 1965)	1 November 2025	31 October 2026	364 days	SPD	Bremen
81	Hendrik Wüst	Hendrik Wüst (born 1975)	1 November 2026	Incumbent	7 days	CDU	North Rhine-Westphalia

== See also ==
- Politics of Germany
