= List of longest-serving German minister-presidents =

This is a list of the 30 longest governing minister-presidents of Germany since 1945 by time in office.

Rank	Ministerpräsident	Period in office	Duration (Years/Days)	States of Germany
1	Bernhard Vogel	2 December 1976 – 8 December 1988	23 years, 125 days	Rhineland-Palatinate
1	Bernhard Vogel	5 February 1992 – 5 June 2003	23 years, 125 days	Thuringia
2	Peter Altmeier	9 July 1947 – 19 May 1969	21 years, 314 days	Rhineland-Palatinate
3	Franz-Josef Röder	30 April 1959 – 26 June 1979	20 years, 57 days	Saarland
4	Wilhelm Kaisen	1 August 1945 – 20 July 1965	19 years, 353 days	Bremen
5	Johannes Rau	20 September 1978 – 27 May 1998	19 years, 249 days	North Rhine-Westphalia
6	Georg August Zinn	14 December 1950 – 3 October 1969	18 years, 293 days	Hesse
7	Kurt Beck	26 October 1994 – 16 January 2013	18 years, 82 days	Rhineland-Palatinate
8	Hans Koschnick	28 November 1967 – 18 September 1985	17 years, 294 days	Bremen
9	Alfons Goppel	11 December 1962 – 7 November 1978	15 years, 331 days	Bavaria
10	Eberhard Diepgen	9 February 1984 – 16 March 1989; 24 January 1991 – 16 June 2001	15 years, 178 days	West Berlin; Berlin
11	Winfried Kretschmann	12 May 2011 – 13 May 2026	15 years, 1 day	Baden-Württemberg
12	Reiner Haseloff	19 April 2011 – 28 January 2026	14 years, 284 days	Saxony-Anhalt
13	Ernst Albrecht	6 February 1976 – 21 June 1990	14 years, 135 days	Lower Saxony
14	Edmund Stoiber	28 May 1993 – 9 October 2007	14 years, 134 days	Bavaria
15	Erwin Teufel	22 January 1991 – 21 April 2005	14 years, 89 days	Baden-Württemberg
16	Oskar Lafontaine	9 April 1985 – 10 November 1998	13 years, 215 days	Saarland
17	Klaus Wowereit	16 June 2001 – 11 December 2014	13 years, 178 days	Berlin
18	Dietmar Woidke	since 28 August 2013	13 years, 52 days	Brandenburg
19	Lothar Späth	30 August 1978 – 22 January 1991	12 years, 145 days	Baden-Württemberg
20	Stephan Weil	19 February 2013 – 20 May 2025	12 years, 90 days	Lower Saxony
21	Heide Simonis	19 May 1993 – 27 April 2005	11 years, 343 days	Schleswig-Holstein
22	Peter Müller	29 September 1999 – 10 August 2011	11 years, 315 days	Saarland
23	Heinz Kühn	8 December 1966 – 20 September 1978	11 years, 286 days	North Rhine-Westphalia
24	Volker Bouffier	31 August 2010 – 31 May 2022	11 years, 273 days	Hesse
25	Hans Filbinger	16 December 1966 – 30 August 1978	11 years, 257 days	Baden-Württemberg
26	Manfred Stolpe	1 November 1990 – 26 June 2002	11 years, 237 days	Brandenburg
27	Malu Dreyer	16 January 2013 – 10 July 2024	11 years, 176 days	Rhineland-Palatinate
28	Kurt Biedenkopf	27 October 1990 – 18 April 2002	11 years, 173 days	Saxony
29	Roland Koch	7 April 1999 – 31 August 2010	11 years, 146 days	Hesse
30	Hinrich Wilhelm Kopf	23 August 1946 – 26 May 1955; 12 May 1959 – 29 December 1961	11 years, 142 days	Lower Saxony
