= Kassel (electoral district) =

Federal electoral district of Germany

167 Kassel
- Electoral district for the Bundestag
- Kassel in 2025
- State: Hesse
- Population: 304,800 (2019)
- Electorate: 218,474 (2021)
- Major settlements: Kassel
- Area: 357.6 km^{2}

Current electoral district
- Created: 1949
- Party: SPD
- Member: Daniel Bettermann
- Elected: 2025

Kassel is an electoral constituency (German: Wahlkreis) represented in the Bundestag. It elects one member via first-past-the-post voting. Under the current constituency numbering system, it is designated as constituency 167. It is located in northern Hesse, comprising the city of Kassel and surrounding parts of the Landkreis Kassel district.

Kassel was created for the inaugural 1949 federal election. Since 2017, it has been represented by Timon Gremmels of the Social Democratic Party (SPD).

== Geography ==
Kassel is located in northern Hesse. As of the 2021 federal election, it comprises the independent city of Kassel and the municipalities of Ahnatal, Espenau, Fuldabrück, Fuldatal, Helsa, Kaufungen, Lohfelden, Nieste, Niestetal, Söhrewald, and Vellmar from the Landkreis Kassel district.

== History ==
Kassel was created in 1949. In the 1949 election, it was Hesse constituency 2 in the numbering system. From 1953 through 1976, it was number 127. From 1980 through 1998, it was number 125. In the 2002 and 2005 elections, it was number 170. In the 2009 election, it was number 169. In the 2013 through 2021 elections, it was number 168. From the 2025 election, it has been number 167.

Originally, the constituency comprised the independent city of Kassel and the Landkreis Kassel district. In the 1965 and 1969 elections, it comprised the city of Kassel and the municipalities of Frommershausen, Heckershausen, Ihringshausen, Knickhagen, Mönchehof, Niedervellmar, Obervellmar, Rothwesten, Simmershausen, Wahnhausen, Ahnatal-Weimar, and Wilhelmshausen from Landkreis Kassel. In the 1972 through 1998 elections, it comprised the city of Kassel and the municipalities of Ahnatal, Espenau, Fuldatal, and Vellmar from Landkreis Kassel. It acquired its current borders in the 2002 election.

Election	No.	Name	Borders
1949	2	Kassel	Kassel city; Landkreis Kassel district
1953	127	Kassel	Kassel city; Landkreis Kassel district
1957	127	Kassel	Kassel city; Landkreis Kassel district
1961	127	Kassel	Kassel city; Landkreis Kassel district
1965	127	Kassel	Kassel city; Landkreis Kassel district (only Frommershausen, Heckershausen, Ihringshausen, Knickhagen, Mönchehof, Niedervellmar, Obervellmar, Rothwesten, Simmershausen, Wahnhausen, Ahnatal-Weimar, and Wilhelmshausen municipalities)
1969	127	Kassel	Kassel city; Landkreis Kassel district (only Frommershausen, Heckershausen, Ihringshausen, Knickhagen, Mönchehof, Niedervellmar, Obervellmar, Rothwesten, Simmershausen, Wahnhausen, Ahnatal-Weimar, and Wilhelmshausen municipalities)
1972	127	Kassel	Kassel city; Landkreis Kassel district (only Ahnatal, Espenau, Fuldatal, and Vellmar municipalities)
1976	127	Kassel	Kassel city; Landkreis Kassel district (only Ahnatal, Espenau, Fuldatal, and Vellmar municipalities)
1980	125	Kassel	Kassel city; Landkreis Kassel district (only Ahnatal, Espenau, Fuldatal, and Vellmar municipalities)
1983	125	Kassel	Kassel city; Landkreis Kassel district (only Ahnatal, Espenau, Fuldatal, and Vellmar municipalities)
1987	125	Kassel	Kassel city; Landkreis Kassel district (only Ahnatal, Espenau, Fuldatal, and Vellmar municipalities)
1990	125	Kassel	Kassel city; Landkreis Kassel district (only Ahnatal, Espenau, Fuldatal, and Vellmar municipalities)
1994	125	Kassel	Kassel city; Landkreis Kassel district (only Ahnatal, Espenau, Fuldatal, and Vellmar municipalities)
1998	125	Kassel	Kassel city; Landkreis Kassel district (only Ahnatal, Espenau, Fuldatal, and Vellmar municipalities)
2002	170	Kassel	Kassel city; Landkreis Kassel district (only Ahnatal, Espenau, Fuldabrück, Fuldatal, Helsa, Kaufungen, Lohfelden, Nieste, Niestetal, Söhrewald, and Vellmar municipalities)
2005	170	Kassel	Kassel city; Landkreis Kassel district (only Ahnatal, Espenau, Fuldabrück, Fuldatal, Helsa, Kaufungen, Lohfelden, Nieste, Niestetal, Söhrewald, and Vellmar municipalities)
2009	169	Kassel	Kassel city; Landkreis Kassel district (only Ahnatal, Espenau, Fuldabrück, Fuldatal, Helsa, Kaufungen, Lohfelden, Nieste, Niestetal, Söhrewald, and Vellmar municipalities)
2013	168	Kassel	Kassel city; Landkreis Kassel district (only Ahnatal, Espenau, Fuldabrück, Fuldatal, Helsa, Kaufungen, Lohfelden, Nieste, Niestetal, Söhrewald, and Vellmar municipalities)
2017	168	Kassel	Kassel city; Landkreis Kassel district (only Ahnatal, Espenau, Fuldabrück, Fuldatal, Helsa, Kaufungen, Lohfelden, Nieste, Niestetal, Söhrewald, and Vellmar municipalities)
2021	168	Kassel	Kassel city; Landkreis Kassel district (only Ahnatal, Espenau, Fuldabrück, Fuldatal, Helsa, Kaufungen, Lohfelden, Nieste, Niestetal, Söhrewald, and Vellmar municipalities)
2025	167	Kassel	Kassel city; Landkreis Kassel district (only Ahnatal, Espenau, Fuldabrück, Fuldatal, Helsa, Kaufungen, Lohfelden, Nieste, Niestetal, Söhrewald, and Vellmar municipalities)

== Members ==
The constituency has been held continuously by the Social Democratic Party (SPD) since its creation. It was first represented by Georg-August Zinn from 1949 until his resignation in 1951 to become Minister-President of Hesse. He was succeeded by Ludwig Preller after a by-election. Holger Börner was elected in 1957 and served until 1976, when he resigned to become Minister-President of Hesse. Horst Peter was then representative from 1980 to 1994. Gerhard Rübenkönig was elected in 1994 and served until 2005. Former Minister-President of Hesse Hans Eichel then served a single term, before being succeeded by Ulrike Gottschalck in 2009. She was representative until 2017. Timon Gremmels was elected in the 2017 election and re-elected in 2021.

Election	Member	Party	%
1949	Georg-August Zinn	SPD	42.3
1951	Ludwig Preller	SPD	55.1
1953	Ludwig Preller	SPD	43.8
1957	Holger Börner	SPD	49.2
1961	Holger Börner	SPD	51.6
1965	Holger Börner	SPD	52.1
1969	Holger Börner	SPD	56.9
1972	Holger Börner	SPD	60.1
1976	Holger Börner	SPD	53.7
1980	Horst Peter	SPD	53.3
1983	Horst Peter	SPD	51.4
1987	Horst Peter	SPD	47.7
1990	Horst Peter	SPD	46.9
1994	Gerhard Rübenkönig	SPD	41.5
1998	Gerhard Rübenkönig	SPD	48.4
2002	Gerhard Rübenkönig	SPD	49.3
2005	Hans Eichel	SPD	50.5
2009	Ulrike Gottschalck	SPD	38.0
2013	Ulrike Gottschalck	SPD	40.0
2017	Timon Gremmels	SPD	35.6
2021	Timon Gremmels	SPD	36.1
2025	Daniel Bettermann	SPD	27.7

== Election results ==
=== 2025 election ===
Federal election (2025): Kassel
Notes:	Blue background denotes the winner of the electorate vote. Pink background denotes a candidate elected from their party list. Yellow background denotes an electorate win by a list member, or other incumbent. A ✓ or ✗ denotes status of any incumbent, win or lose respectively.						
Party	Candidate	Votes	%	±%	Party votes	%	±%
SPD	Daniel Bettermann	47,903	27.7	▼8.4	38,770	22.3	▼9.9
CDU	Maik Behschad	42,003	24.3	▲3.9	38,984	22.5	▲4.9
AfD	Thomas Schenk	28,122	16.2	▲9.2	27,359	15.8	▲8.2
Greens	Boris Mijatović	24,335	14.1	▼3.2	25,224	14.5	▼4.3
Left	Violetta Bock	20,208	11.7	▲5.8	21,334	12.3	▲5.7
FDP	Jan Terborg	4,734	2.7	▼5.3	6,238	3.6	▼6.6
Tierschutzpartei					2,363	1.4	▼0.1
FW	Christian Klobuczynski	2,934	1.7	▲0.1	1,517	0.9	▼0.3
Volt	Timo Scharf	2,485	1.4	New	1,272	0.7	▲0.5
PARTEI					859	0.5	▼0.5
BD					264	0.2	New
MLPD	Hans Roth	370	0.2	▲0.1	126	0.1	0.0
Humanists					118	0.1	0.0
Informal votes		2,057			1,558		
Total valid votes		173,094			173,593		
Turnout		175,151	81.8	▲7.3			
SPD hold	Majority	5,900	3.4	▼12.3			

=== 2021 election ===
Federal election (2021): Kassel
Notes:	Blue background denotes the winner of the electorate vote. Pink background denotes a candidate elected from their party list. Yellow background denotes an electorate win by a list member, or other incumbent. A ✓ or ✗ denotes status of any incumbent, win or lose respectively.						
Party	Candidate	Votes	%	±%	Party votes	%	±%
SPD	✓ Timon Gremmels	57,919	36.1	▲0.5	51,812	32.2	▲3.9
CDU	Michael Aufenanger	32,765	20.4	▼6.5	28,183	17.5	▼7.7
Greens	Boris Mijatović	27,744	17.3	▲7.9	30,348	18.9	▲7.4
FDP	Matthias Nölke	12,966	8.1	▲2.2	16,448	10.2	▲1.1
AfD	Sibylle Johst	11,348	7.1	▼2.9	12,141	7.5	▼2.9
Left	Stephanie Schury	9,357	5.8	▼2.9	10,518	6.5	▼4.8
Tierschutzpartei					2,346	1.5	▲0.5
PARTEI	Franz Czisch	2,876	1.8	▲0.5	1,673	1.0	▲0.1
FW	Michael Scheffler	2,563	1.6	▲0.8	1,824	1.1	▲0.5
dieBasis	Stefan Fydrich	2,012	1.3		1,854	1.2	
Team Todenhöfer					1,159	0.7	
Pirates					694	0.4	0.0
Volt					442	0.3	
Independent	Cornelius Sayyed El-Fayoumy	416	0.3				
Bündnis C	Wolfgang Peuckert	299	0.2		217	0.1	
Gesundheitsforschung					215	0.1	
Humanists					180	0.1	
ÖDP					175	0.1	0.0
V-Partei3					156	0.1	0.0
NPD					143	0.1	▼0.2
MLPD	Klaus Bremer	244	0.2	0.0	133	0.1	0.0
DKP					89	0.1	0.0
Independent	Stephan Mascher	87	0.1				
Bündnis 21					48	0.0	
LKR					31	0.0	
Informal votes		2,213			1,980		
Total valid votes		160,596			160,829		
Turnout		162,809	74.5	▼0.9			
SPD hold	Majority	25,154	15.7	▲7.0			

=== 2017 election ===
Federal election (2017): Kassel
Notes:	Blue background denotes the winner of the electorate vote. Pink background denotes a candidate elected from their party list. Yellow background denotes an electorate win by a list member, or other incumbent. A ✓ or ✗ denotes status of any incumbent, win or lose respectively.						
Party	Candidate	Votes	%	±%	Party votes	%	±%
SPD	Timon Gremmels	58,759	35.6	▼4.4	46,769	28.3	▼5.7
CDU	Norbert Wett	44,425	26.9	▼8.3	41,736	25.2	▼5.7
AfD	Manfred Günther Ernst Leopold Mattis	16,501	10.0		17,288	10.5	▲5.4
Greens	Boris Mijatovic	15,466	9.4	▼1.3	18,935	11.4	▼1.3
Left	Torsten Felstehausen	14,472	8.8	▲0.4	18,677	11.3	▲2.5
FDP	Matthias Nölke (Note: Nölke entered the Bundestag on the FDP list after the resignation of Stefan Ruppert in April 2020.)	9,759	5.9	▲3.9	15,046	9.1	▲5.1
Tierschutzpartei					1,590	1.0	
PARTEI	Jan Schuster	2,180	1.3		1,589	1.0	▲0.5
FW	Helmut Peter Heinz Paul	1,311	0.8		1,003	0.6	▲0.1
Pirates	Robin Geddert	1,222	0.7	▼2.2	794	0.5	▲1.8
Independent	Susanne Anita Holbein	566	0.3				
BGE					488	0.3	
NPD					417	0.3	▼0.5
DM					360	0.2	
ÖDP					224	0.1	
V-Partei³					215	0.1	
MLPD	Michaela Elisabeth Theresia Jakob	313	0.2	0.0	184	0.1	0.0
Independent	Eva-Maria Gent	304	0.2				
DKP					59	0.0	
BüSo					29	0.0	0.0
Informal votes		2,577			2,452		
Total valid votes		165,278			165,403		
Turnout		167,855	75.5	▲3.9			
SPD hold	Majority	14,334	8.7	▲3.9			

=== 2013 election ===
Federal election (2013): Kassel
Notes:	Blue background denotes the winner of the electorate vote. Pink background denotes a candidate elected from their party list. Yellow background denotes an electorate win by a list member, or other incumbent. A ✓ or ✗ denotes status of any incumbent, win or lose respectively.						
Party	Candidate	Votes	%	±%	Party votes	%	±%
SPD	✓ Ulrike Gottschalck	62,178	40.0	▲2.0	53,232	34.0	▲2.8
CDU	Norbert Wett	54,674	35.2	▲4.8	48,361	30.9	▲5.4
Greens	Nicole Maisch	16,559	10.7	▼1.6	19,884	12.7	▼2.1
Left	Kai Manuel Boeddinghaus	13,066	8.4	▼1.5	13,680	8.7	▼2.5
AfD					7,977	5.1	
Pirates	Volker Berkhout	4,624	3.0		3,575	2.3	0.0
FDP	Matthias Nölke	3,192	2.1	▼5.7	6,259	4.0	▼8.6
NPD					1,218	0.8	0.0
Independent	Herbert Wolfgang Dirk Stolte	845	0.5				
FW					839	0.5	
PARTEI					796	0.5	
REP					198	0.1	▼0.2
PRO					155	0.1	
SGP					89	0.1	
BüSo					51	0.0	▼0.1
MLPD	Joachim Karl Ludolf Gärtner	325	0.2	0.0	165	0.1	0.0
Informal votes		5,232			4,216		
Total valid votes		155,463			156,479		
Turnout		160,695	71.6	▼0.8			
SPD hold	Majority	7,504	4.8	▼2.8			

=== 2009 election ===
Federal election (2009): Kassel
Notes:	Blue background denotes the winner of the electorate vote. Pink background denotes a candidate elected from their party list. Yellow background denotes an electorate win by a list member, or other incumbent. A ✓ or ✗ denotes status of any incumbent, win or lose respectively.						
Party	Candidate	Votes	%	±%	Party votes	%	±%
SPD	Ulrike Gottschalck	59,621	38.0	▼12.5	49,114	31.3	▼12.6
CDU	Jürgen Gehb	47,643	30.4	▼0.2	40,134	25.5	▼1.0
Greens	Nicole Maisch	19,246	12.3	▲4.5	23,320	14.8	▲3.0
Left	Norbert Domes	15,453	9.9	▲4.1	17,656	11.2	▲4.5
FDP	Mechthild Dyckmans	12,188	7.8	▲3.8	19,820	12.6	▲4.4
Pirates					3,523	2.2	
Tierschutzpartei					1,374	0.9	▲0.3
NPD	Martin Radtke	1,594	1.0	▼0.1	1,275	0.8	▼0.1
Independent	Olaf Petersen	715	0.5				
REP					470	0.3	▼0.2
MLPD	Barbara Meyer	319	0.2	▼0.1	173	0.1	0.0
BüSo					159	0.1	0.0
DVU					112	0.1	
Informal votes		4,254			3,903		
Total valid votes		156,779			157,130		
Turnout		161,033	72.3	▼6.1			
SPD hold	Majority	11,978	7.6	▼12.3			

=== 2005 election ===
Federal election (2005):Kassel
Notes:	Blue background denotes the winner of the electorate vote. Pink background denotes a candidate elected from their party list. Yellow background denotes an electorate win by a list member, or other incumbent. A ✓ or ✗ denotes status of any incumbent, win or lose respectively.						
Party	Candidate	Votes	%	±%	Party votes	%	±%
SPD	Hans Eichel	85,117	50.5	▲1.2	74,140	43.9	▼4.0
CDU	Jürgen Gehb	51,470	30.6	▼0.6	44,773	26.5	▼2.6
Greens	Matthias Berninger	13,119	7.8	▼3.7	20,086	11.9	▼0.1
Left	Norbert Domes	9,718	5.8	▲4.1	11,414	6.8	▲5.0
FDP	Mechthild Dyckmans	6,619	3.9	▼0.8	13,884	8.2	▲1.5
NPD	Harry Kirsch	1,844	1.1	▲0.5	1,519	0.9	▲0.6
Tierschutzpartei					1,028	0.6	▲0.1
GRAUEN					871	0.5	▲0.2
REP					760	0.4	▲0.1
MLPD	Klaus Bremer	480	0.3		257	0.2	
SGP					123	0.1	
BüSo					98	0.1	0.0
Informal votes		4,899			4,353		
Total valid votes		168,407			168,953		
Turnout		173,306	78.5	▼0.7			
SPD hold	Majority	33,647	19.9				
