= Zeyer =

Zeyer is a surname. Notable people with the surname include:

- Alexander Zeyer (born 1993), German politician
- Andreas Zeyer (born 1968), German footballer
- Julius Zeyer (1841–1901), Czech writer, poet, and playwright
- Michael Zeyer (born 1968), German footballer, twin brother of Andreas
- Werner Zeyer (1929–2000), German politician

== See also ==
- Meyer (surname)
