= Boris Mijatović (politician) =

German politician (born 1974)

Boris Mijatović (born 4 February 1974 in Kassel) is a German politician of The Greens who has been serving as a member of the Bundestag since 2021, representing the Kassel district.

== Early life and career ==
Mijatović was born 1974 in the West German city of Kassel. Following his graduation from Jacob Grimm School in Kassel in 1993, Mijatović worked for a startup until 1998. In 2001, he completed his master's degree in political science at the University of Kassel, where he subsequently worked as a research assistant.

Following his internship at the International Criminal Court in The Hague from 2005 to 2006, he was a freelance worker for victim research projects from 2005 to 2010.

Mijatović is married and lives in Kassel.

== Political career ==
Mijatović joined the Green Party in 2004. He has been a city councillor of Kassel since 2011, first in the Committee for Integration and Sports and since 2016 for Youth Policy and Participation. From 2015 to 2019, he was district chairman of the Kassel Greens. Since 2018, Mijatović has been a member of the state executive committee of Hessen, and since 2019, he has been the parliamentary group chairman in Kassel.

From 2011 to 2017 Mijatović worked as advisor for Nicole Maisch, a member of the Bundestag, and from 2018 to 2021 for Martin Häusling, member of the European Parliament.

In 2021, as previously in 2017, Mijatović ran for the direct mandate in the Kassel constituency but lost to Timon Gremmels (SPD) with 17.3% (2017: 9.4%) of the vote.

=== Member of the German Parliament, 2021–present ===
In 2021, Mijatović was elected to the Bundestag via list position 8 of the Hessian Greens, representing the Kassel district. In parliament, Mijatović has been serving on the Committee on Human Rights and Humanitarian Aid. From 2021 to 2025, he was a member of the Committee on European Affairs. Since 2025, he has been part of the Committee on Foreign Affairs and chairing its Subcommittee on the United Nations.

In addition to his committee assignments, Mijatović is also part of the Inter-Parliamentary Alliance on China.

== Other activities ==
- Centre for International Peace Operations (ZIF), Member of the supervisory board (since 2022)
