= Nadine Ruf =

German politician (born 1978)

Member of the Bundestag; for Kassel
- In office 26 January 2024 – 25 March 2025
- Preceded by: Timon Gremmels
- Succeeded by: Daniel Bettermann

Personal details
- Born: 2 February 1978 (age 48) Wiesbaden, West Germany
- Party: Social Democratic
- Children: 3
- Education: University of Applied Sciences Wiesbaden

Nadine Ruf (born 2 February 1978) is a German politician from the Social Democratic Party of Germany. She served as a Member of the German Bundestag from January 2024 to March 2025.

== Early life ==
Ruf was born in Wiesbaden, where she grew up as the daughter of a single mother in the Rambach district. In 1998, she graduated from the Martin Niemöller School in Wiesbaden. She then studied International Business Administration at the Wiesbaden University of Applied Sciences, completing her studies in 2003. Since 2003, she has worked as a research assistant for SPD members of the Hessian state parliament.

== Political career ==
Ruf has been a member of the SPD since 1994. She has been a member of the Wiesbaden city council since 2004 and was chairwoman of the SPD group from 2017 to 2019.

In the 2021 federal election, Ruf ran in the Wiesbaden federal constituency and in 10th place on the SPD state list in Hesse, but initially missed entry into the Bundestag. On 26 January 2024, she replaced Timon Gremmels in the Bundestag.

She held her first speech in the Bundestag on the 4th of April 2024 about the Freiwilligen-Teilzeitgesetz

== Personal life ==
Ruf is a Protestant, married and has three daughters. She lives in Wiesbaden-Rambach.
