= Ulrike Gottschalck =

German politician

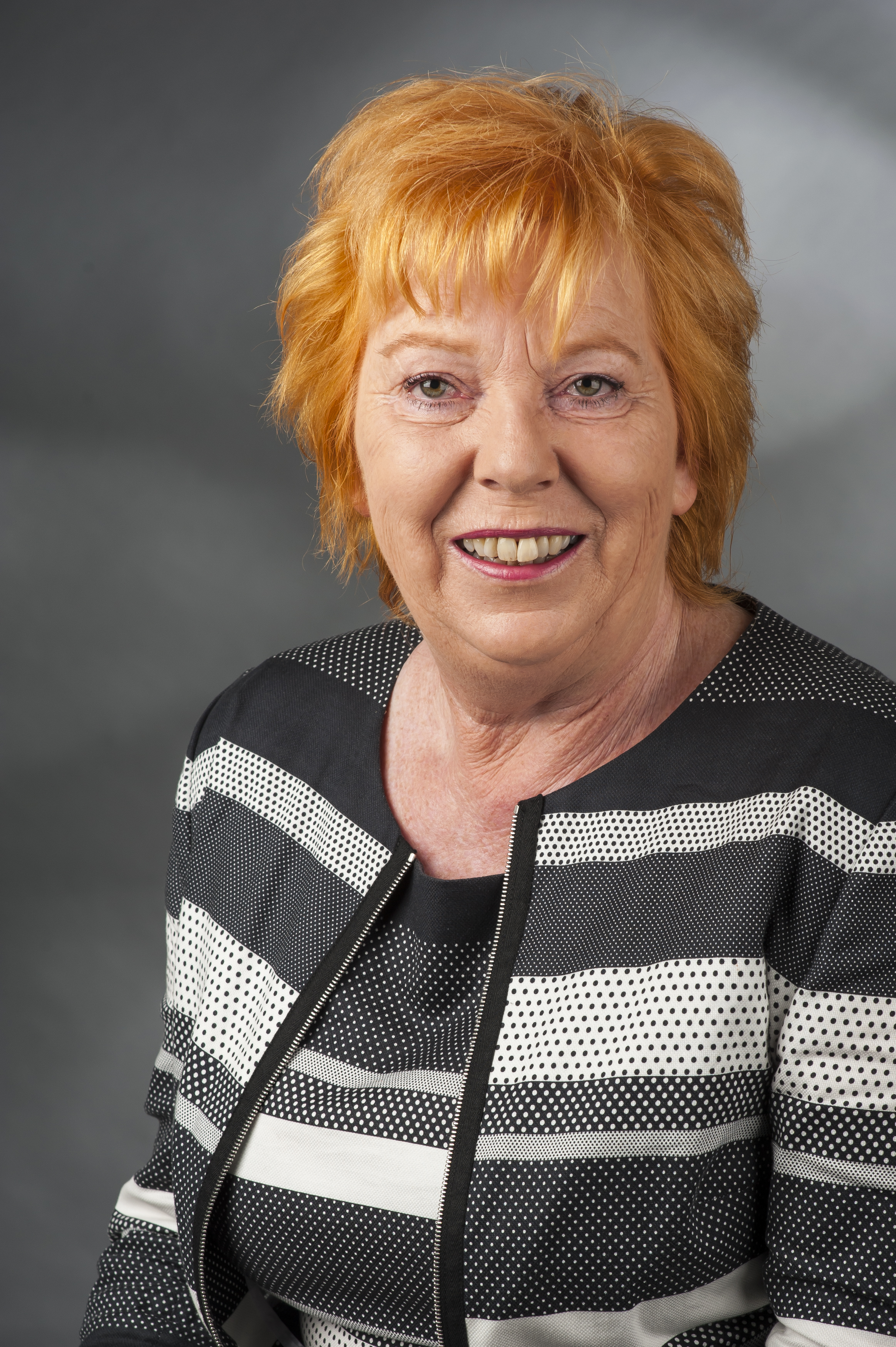
- Gottschalck in 2014

Member of the Bundestag; for Kassel
- In office 27 October 2009 – 24 October 2017
- Preceded by: Hans Eichel
- Succeeded by: Timon Gremmels

Member of the Landtag of Hesse; for Kassel-Land II
- In office 3 June 2005 – 31 October 2009
- Preceded by: Manfred Schaub
- Succeeded by: Timon Gremmels

Personal details
- Born: 8 November 1955 (age 70) Sandershausen, West Germany
- Party: Social Democratic
- Children: 3

Ulrike Gottschalck (born 8 November 1955) is a German politician who served as a member of the Bundestag from 2009 to 2017.

== Early life and education ==
Born in Sandershausen, Gottschalck completed secondary school in 1970, and after training in information technology, she became an IT consultant from 1984 to 1996.

== Political career ==
Gottschalck was first active politically with the Social Democratic Party of Germany (SPD) upon joining the party in 1974. From 1999 to 2005, she served as a parliamentary manager for SPD, and in 2005 she was elected to the state parliament of Hesse. After serving for four years, she was elected in 2009 to the Bundestag with 38% of the vote in the Kassel constituency, after originally being a last-second replacement for another SPD candidate who withdrew. During her first term, she served on the Committee for Transport, Building and Urban Development.

Gottschalck was re-elected in 2013 with 40% of the vote. During her time in the Bundestag, she served as a member of the Budget Committee, and a deputy member of the Committee on Family, Seniors, Women and Youth. Gottschalck chose not to seek a third term, and retired at the end of the 18th Bundestag.

== Personal life ==
Gottschalck is married and has three children.
