= Alfred Kubel =

German politician (1909–1999)

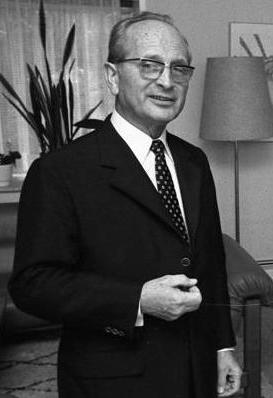
- Alfred Kubel in 1975

Minister President of Lower Saxony
- In office 8 July 1970 – 6 February 1976
- Preceded by: Georg Diederichs
- Succeeded by: Ernst Albrecht

President of the Bundesrat
- In office 1 November 1974 – 31 October 1975
- Preceded by: Hans Filbinger
- Succeeded by: Albert Osswald

Personal details
- Born: 25 May 1909 Braunschweig, Duchy of Brunswick, German Empire
- Died: 22 May 1999 (aged 89) Bad Pyrmont, Lower Saxony, Germany
- Party: Social Democratic Party

Alfred Kubel (25 May 1909 in Braunschweig – 22 May 1999 in Bad Pyrmont) was a German politician; in his later career, he was a member of the Social Democratic Party of Germany (SPD).

In 1928, after attending Middle School, Kubel became an industrial clerk. In 1925, Kubel became a member of Internationaler Sozialistischer Kampfbund, a left-wing political party. During that time, he also joined a trade union. Starting in 1933, he became active in resistance to the Nazis. Kubel was arrested in 1937 and was convicted to a one-year prison term for preparation of high treason. He was drafted into the Volkssturm, a branch of the military, in 1944, and deserted soon thereafter.

In May 1946, after having joined the Social Democratic Party of Germany, Kubel was appointed prime minister of Braunschweig by the British occupation forces; he held this position until the state was merged into Lower Saxony in November 1946. From 1951 to 1955 and from 1957 to 1970, he held various cabinet-level positions in the government of Lower Saxony. As minister, he also served on the Volkswagen Group's advisory board from 1965 to 1970.

Kubel was Minister President of Lower Saxony from 8 July 1970 to 6 February 1976. During that time, he served as President of the Bundesrat from 1 November 1974 to 31 October 1975.

Preceded by Hubert Schlebusch	Prime Minister of Brunswick; 1946	Succeeded by position abolished
Preceded by Georg Diederichs	Prime Minister of Lower Saxony; 1970–1976	Succeeded by Ernst Albrecht
