= Daniel Bettermann =

German politician (born 1980)

Daniel Bettermann MdB
- Bettermann in 2025

Member of the Bundestag; for Kassel
- Incumbent
- Assumed office 25 March 2025
- Preceded by: Nadine Ruf

Personal details
- Born: 17 October 1980 (age 45) Warburg, West Germany
- Party: Social Democratic (since 2007)
- Education: University of Kassel

Daniel Bettermann (born 17 October 1980) is a German politician who was elected as a member of the Bundestag in 2025. From 2011 to 2015, he was a local councillor in Waldau.
