= Georg August Zinn =

German politician (1901–1976)

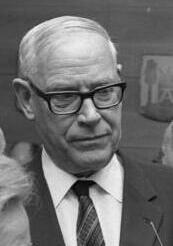
- Zinn in 1967

Minister-President of Hesse
- In office 14 December 1950 – 3 October 1969
- Preceded by: Christian Stock
- Succeeded by: Albert Osswald

President of the Bundesrat
- In office 1 November 1964 – 31 October 1965
- Preceded by: Georg Diederichs
- Succeeded by: Peter Altmeier
- In office 7 September 1953 – 6 September 1954
- Preceded by: Reinhold Maier
- Succeeded by: Peter Altmeier

Minister for Justice of Hesse
- In office 1 November 1945 – 31 January 1963
- Minister-President: Karl Geiler; Christian Stock; Himself
- Preceded by: Robert Fritz
- Succeeded by: Lauritz Lauritzen

Member of the Landtag of Hesse
- In office 1 December 1954 – 1 December 1970
- Constituency: State list (1954–1958); Wahlkreis 04 (1958–1962); State list (1962–1970)

Member of the Bundestag; from Hesse
- In office 17 October 1961 – 13 December 1961
- Preceded by: Multi-member district
- Succeeded by: Brigitte Freyh
- Constituency: State list
- In office 7 September 1949 – 21 January 1951
- Preceded by: Constituency established
- Succeeded by: Ludwig Preller
- Constituency: Kassel

Personal details
- Born: 27 May 1901 Frankfurt, Germany
- Died: 27 March 1976 (aged 74) Frankfurt, West Germany
- Party: Social Democratic

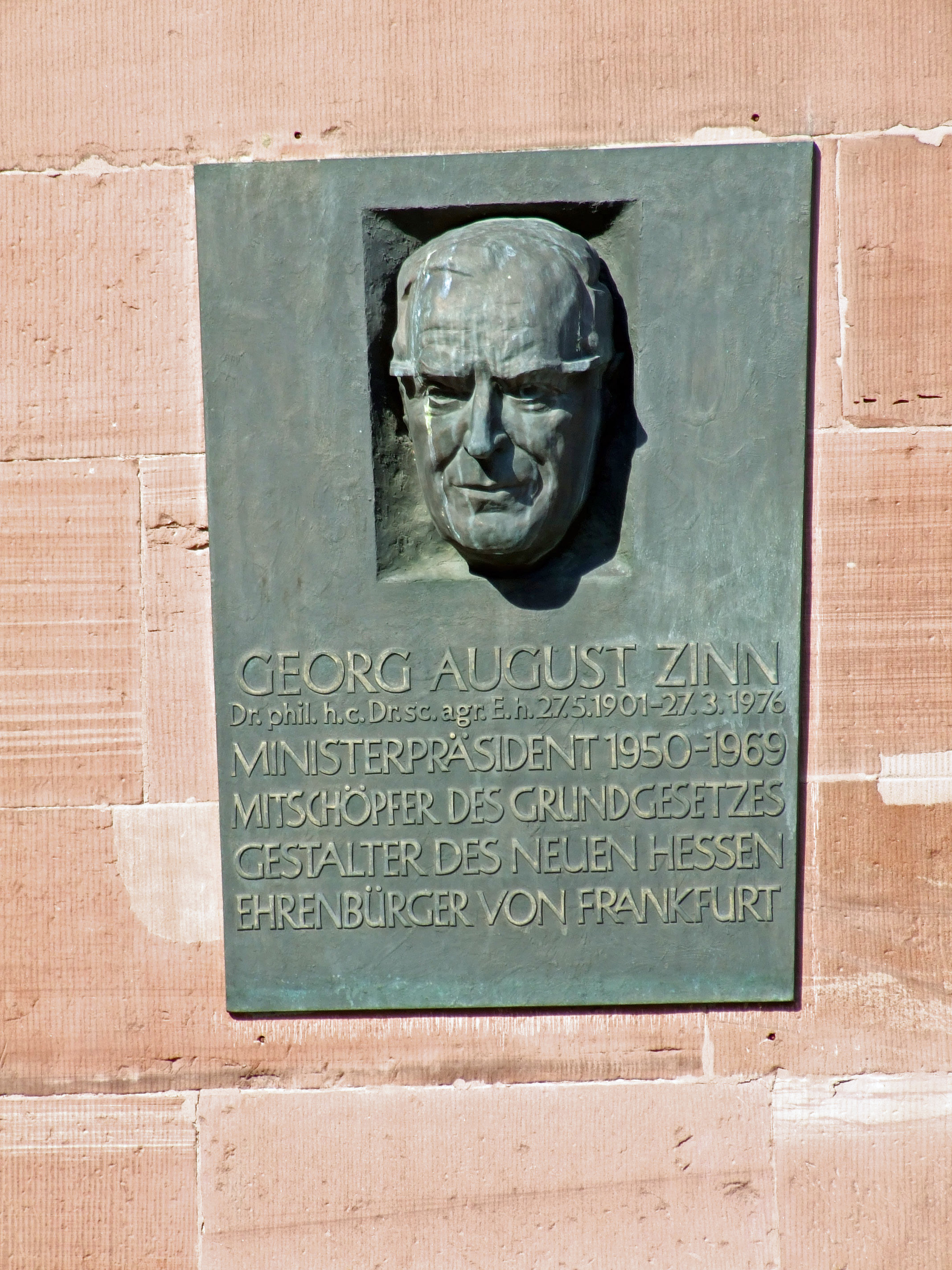
Memorial to Zinn in Paulskirche, Frankfurt

Georg August Zinn (27 May 1901 – 27 March 1976) was a German lawyer and a politician of the SPD. He was a member of the Bundestag from 1949 to 1951 representing Kassel, the 2nd Minister-President of Hesse from 1950 to 1969 and served as the 5th and 16th President of the Bundesrat in 1953/54 and 1964/65.

While he was at the helm of Hesse government he played an important role, although quite discreetly, in the capture of Nazi criminal Adolf Eichmann. In Shlomo J. Shpiro's introduction to Isser Harel's book The House on Garibaldi Street, added to the 1997 expanded edition, it is revealed for the first time that then Hesse prosecutor-general Fritz Bauer did not act alone, in the attempt to apprehend Eichmann while he was hiding in Argentina, but was discreetly helped by Zinn.

Zinn was married twice. His second wife was Dr. Christa Zinn (1927–2002). Three sons are still living, Karl Georg Zinn (born 1939, economist), Dr. Georg-Christian Zinn and Dr. Philip-André Zinn.

He was born in Frankfurt and died in Frankfurt.
