= Hans Eichel =

German politician (born 1941)

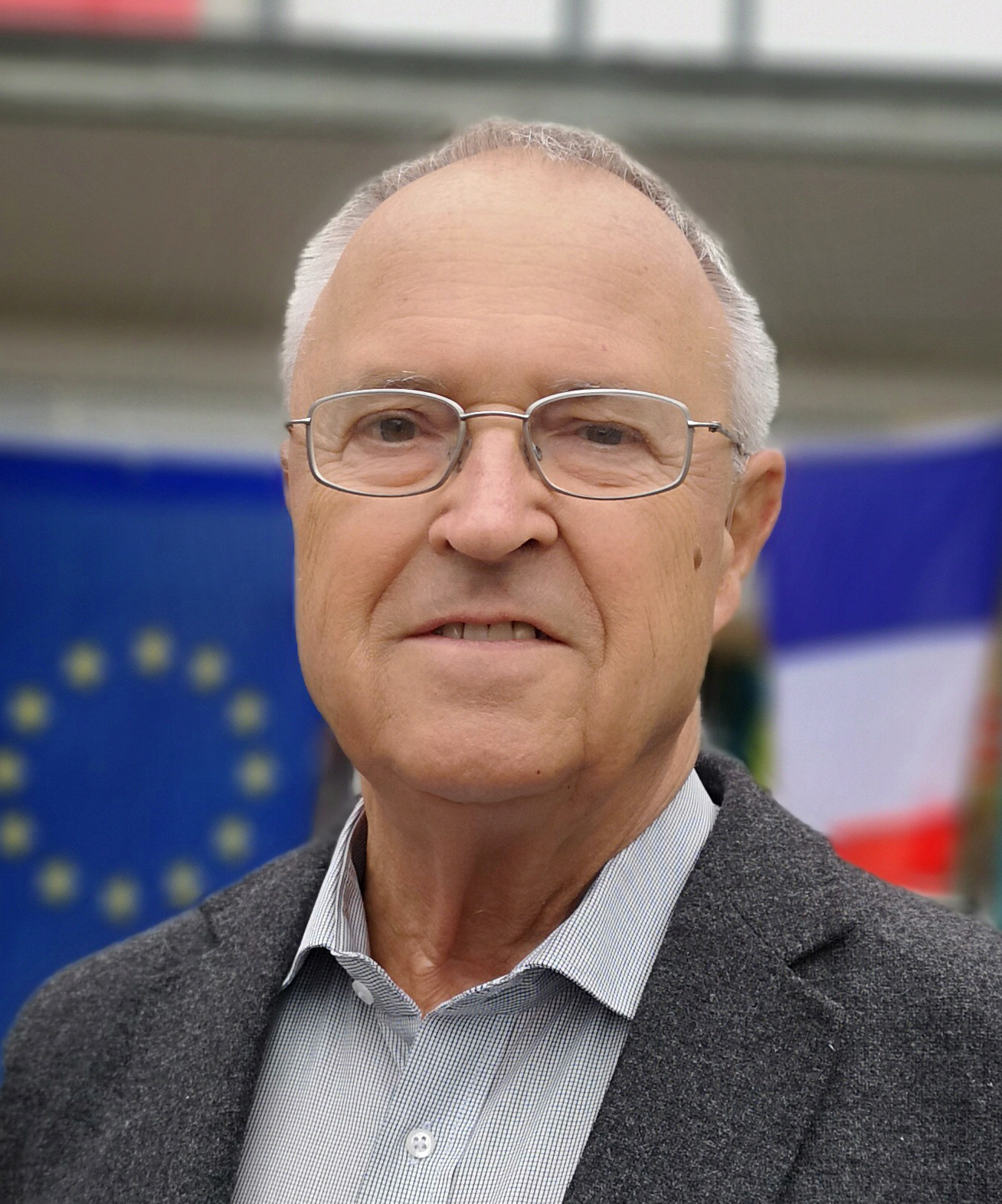
- Eichel in 2018

Minister of Finance
- In office 12 April 1999 – 22 November 2005
- Chancellor: Gerhard Schröder
- Preceded by: Oskar Lafontaine
- Succeeded by: Peer Steinbrück

Member of the Bundestag; from Hesse
- In office 17 October 2002 – 27 October 2009
- Preceded by: Multi-member district
- Succeeded by: Ulrike Gottschalck
- Constituency: State list (2002–2005); Kassel (2005–2009)

President of the Bundesrat
- In office 1 November 1998 – 23 April 1999
- Preceded by: Gerhard Schröder
- Succeeded by: Roland Koch

Minister-President of Hesse
- In office 1 April 1991 – 7 April 1999
- Deputy: Joschka Fischer; Rupert von Plottnitz
- Preceded by: Walter Wallmann
- Succeeded by: Roland Koch

Member of the Landtag of Hesse
- In office 5 April 1991 – 12 April 1999
- Preceded by: Hans Krollmann
- Succeeded by: Uwe Frankenberger
- Constituency: Kassel-Stadt I (1991–1995); State list (1995–1999); Kassel-Stadt I (1999)

Lord Mayor of Kassel
- In office 1975–1991
- Preceded by: Karl Branner
- Succeeded by: Wolfram Bremeier

Personal details
- Born: Hans Carl Heinrich Eichel; 24 December 1941 (age 84) Kassel, Germany
- Party: Social Democratic
- Children: 2
- Education: Marburg University; Free University of Berlin
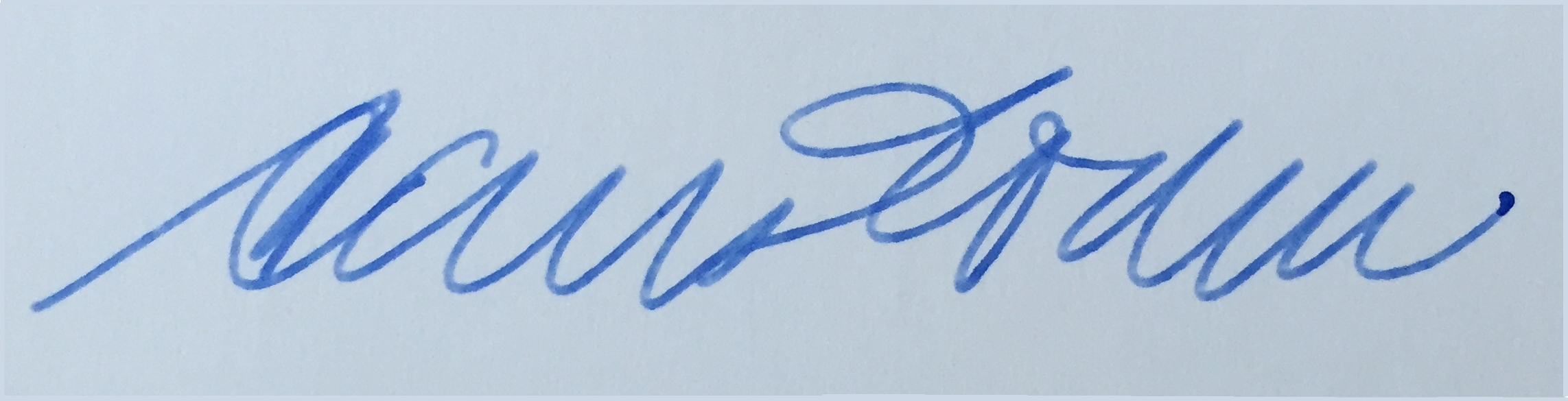
- Signature

Hans Eichel (born 24 December 1941) is a German politician (SPD) and one of the three co-founders of the G20, or "Group of Twenty", an international forum for the governments and central bank governors of twenty developed and developing nations to discuss policy issues pertaining to the promotion of international financial stability.

He was Germany's Minister of Finance between 1999 and 2005. Eichel was chairman of the G7 in 1999 and chairman of the G20 in 2004. Before that, Eichel served as the 6th Minister President of Hesse from 1991 to 1999 and as the 52nd President of the Bundesrat in 1998/99.

During his time in office, Eichel played a very important role in two landmark reforms – the far reaching reform of German society and economy (also known as Agenda 2010) and the creation of the G-20 to reflect the rebalancing of world power. Some argue that Agenda 2010 helped turn Germany from the 'sick man of Europe' into the best performing major Western economy after the 2008 financial crisis. While some parties regarded it as the most successful economic reforms in Germany in over half a century, as well as in any G7 country in 30 years, it also created massive controversy and protests. The effects of the Agenda 2010 on German economic development remain disputed.

As chairman of the G7, Eichel initiated the creation of the G20 together with then US Treasury Secretary Larry Summers and hosted its inaugural meeting in Berlin. The G20 rapidly grew to become the most influential economic body in the world. Eichel went on to serve as chairman of the G20 in 2004, when he pressed for the reforming of the international financial architecture and establishing a code of conduct on preventing financial crises.

== Early life and education ==
Eichel was brought up in Kassel where he did his Abitur in 1961. He then completed a degree in German, philosophy, political science, history and education at the universities of Marburg and Berlin, graduating in 1970. After that, he worked as a teacher for five years in a Kassel Gymnasium, the Wilhelmsgymnasium, before winning election as the mayor of Kassel at age 33.

== Political career ==
=== Career in local politics ===
In his early days, Eichel was known for his campaigns for green causes and against nuclear weapons but for most of his political career, he became associated with stimulating investment and creating jobs. He was noted for his consensus building skills and an ability to mix pragmatism with a mastery of detail. Eichel believed strongly in European federation and on merging Europe's armies and foreign services, and on giving them a single foreign minister. He argued that Europe would be very much stronger if it spoke to the outside world with one voice.

From 1975 to 1991, Eichel served as mayor of Kassel, initially gaining the office at the age of only 33.

=== Minister-President of Hesse (1991–1999) ===
From 1991 to 1999, Eichel was the Minister-President of Hesse in a coalition government with the Green Party. The coalition won again four years later and was the first red-green coalition to serve two consecutive terms. Eichel also served as President of the Bundesrat from November 1998 to April 1999. However, he unexpectedly lost the 1999 state elections to Roland Koch's CDU and lost his office.

=== Minister of Finance (1999–2005) ===
In March 1999, Oskar Lafontaine resigned as Minister of Finance in the government of Chancellor Gerhard Schröder, and Eichel replaced him a month later. He served as a member of the Bundestag from 2002 to 2009.

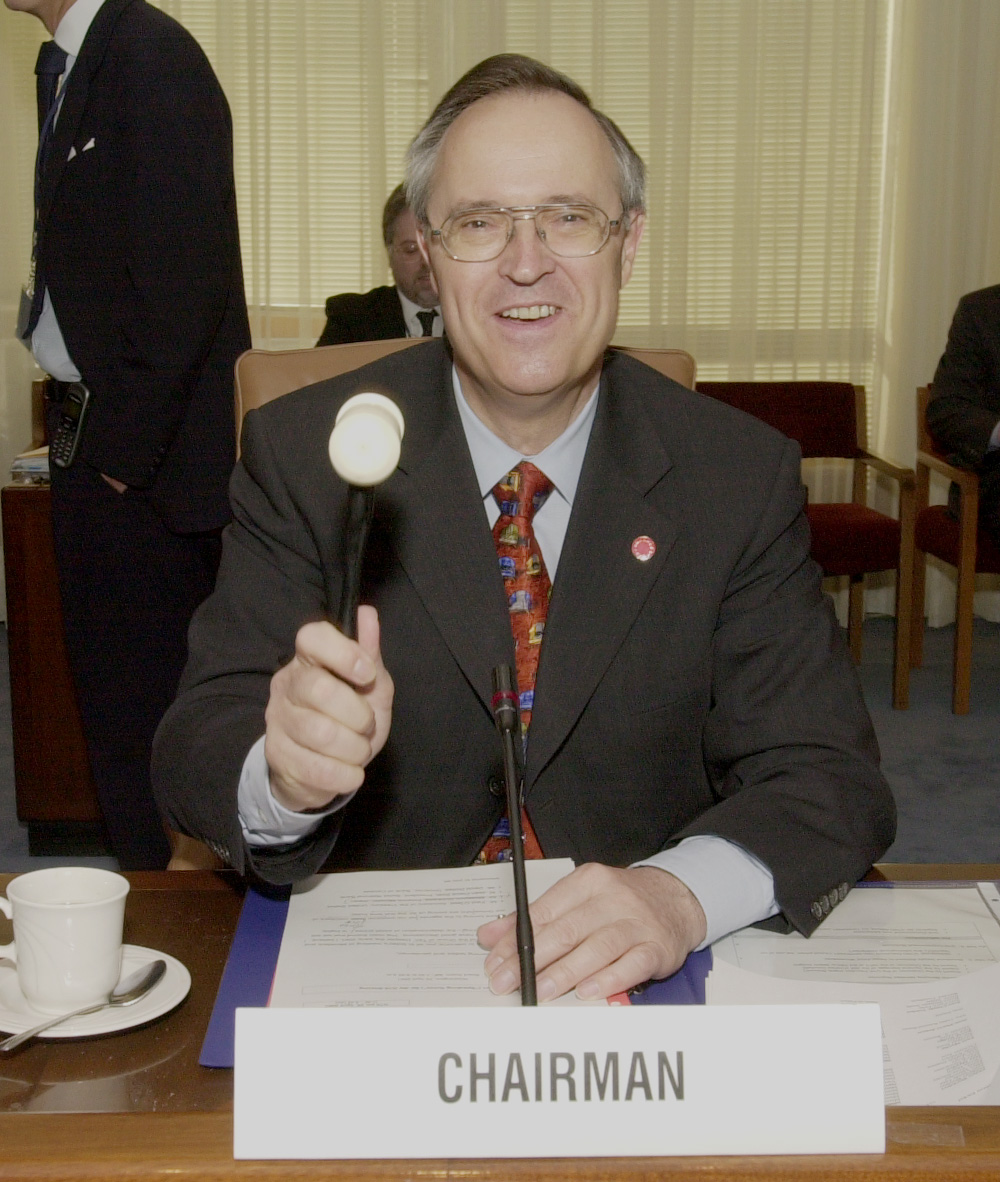
Eichel in 2001

At the beginning of his term, Eichel tried to decrease the German federal deficit and wanted a balanced budget until 2006. Initially he was successful and earned the nickname Iron Hans or Iron Minister because of his ability to exercise strict budget discipline. The Economist magazine's description of him:

As federal minister of finance, Hans Eichel introduced a series of tax reductions and pursued a policy of fiscal consolidation that emphasized budget restraint. Appointed in 1999, he succeeded Oskar Lafontaine, whose approach to fiscal policy differed significantly.During his early years in office, Eichel was regarded by some commentators as one of the most influential members of the government. His fiscal policies, including spending cuts and budget discipline. Were widely noted. While his supporters praised his integrity, political resolve and loyalty to Chancellor Gerhard Schroeder.

Despite initial success, due to constraints by the cabinet and by the worsening economic situation after the short boom in 1999/2000, he had to abandon those plans. After the election Eichel had to recalculate the budget due to the deteriorating economy and found that he would have $18 billion less in tax revenue than was anticipated. The German budget deficit was 3.8%, exceeding the 3% ceiling set by the EU's Stability Pact. Until 2005, when he stepped down, Eichel did not reduce the deficit to under the 3% stability threshold, mainly due to the decision from Chancellor Schroder to not force excessive austerity on the German people on top of the deep economic reforms taking place.

Toward the end of his term, in late 2004, Eichel and U.S. Treasury Secretary John W. Snow worked out a proposal to cancel 80 percent, or about $33 billion, of the debt owed by Iraq to a group of creditor nations known as the Paris Club, capping an American effort for debt forgiveness.

=== Controversy ===
Eichel had a public spat in 2003 with then International Monetary Fund (IMF) chief Horst Köhler, accusing Köhler and the IMF of being too harsh on Germany and too soft on the risks and policy failures of the United States. Köhler defended the harsh criticism of Germany and rejected the notion that the IMF was too soft on the US. However, experts pointed out in 2003 that there was growing evidence that the IMF was reluctant to explore the more problematic aspects of American economic and financial policies such as the concentration of derivative risks at a few big US financial institutions and early warning signs of the building up of risks in Fannie Mae and Freddie Mac. The public and global sentiment in 2003 was against Eichel as Germany was then viewed as the 'sick man of Europe' but consequently, the developments of the 2008 financial crisis radiating out of the US, happening in parallel with the renaissance of the German economy, would suggest that Eichel was in the right.

After the tax reforms of 2001 and 2002, the German banking industry association sent Eichel's internal revenue ministry three letters in total in late 2002 and early 2003 warning about a tax loophole allowing investors to receive more than one tax reimbursement for a single short transaction. Depending on how many times investors short sold a share in a period of 48 hours after a dividend disbursement, tax refunds were erroneously paid out up to four or five times for that single short-sell transaction. Eichel's ministry took no corrective action in response, and from that time forward, gradually larger and larger amounts of forfeited tax revenue resulted.

=== G-20 ===
The G-20 was created in 1999, after the 1997 Asian financial crisis, as a forum for cooperation and consultation on matters pertaining to the international financial system.

According to senior researchers at the Brookings Institution, the G-20 was founded at the initiative of Eichel, then German finance minister who was also concurrently chair of the G-7. Other sources identify Hans Eichel, US Treasury Secretary Larry Summers, and Canadian Finance Minister Paul Martin as the three key initiators.

According to University of Toronto professor John Kirton, the membership of the G-20 was decided by Eichel's assistant Caio Koch-Weser and Summers' assistant Timothy Geithner. In Kirton's book 'G20 Governance for a Globalised World',

Geithner and Koch-Weser went down the list of countries saying, Canada in, Spain out, South Africa in, Nigeria and Egypt out, and so on; they sent their list to the other G7 finance ministries; and the invitations to the first meeting went out.

The group was formally inaugurated in September 1999, Canadian finance minister Paul Martin was chosen to be the first chairman and German finance minister Hans Eichel hosted the first G-20 meeting of finance ministers in December 1999 in Berlin.

== Other activities ==
Eichel currently leads the expert group on sustainable structural development for the Friedrich Ebert Foundation, the world's oldest and largest foundation to promote democracy and political education.

In addition, Eichel has been holding various paid and unpaid positions since leaving active politics, including the following:

- WMP Eurocom, Member of the supervisory board (2010-2020)
- Institute for Law and Finance at the Goethe University Frankfurt, Member of the Board of Trustees
- Official Monetary and Financial Institutions Forum (OMFIF), Member of the Advisory Board
- Rheingau Musik Festival, Member of the Board of Trustees
- Deutsche Sporthilfe, Member of the Foundation's Council
- 7000 Oaks Foundation, Member of the Board of Trustees

Political offices
Preceded by Walter Wallmann (CDU)	Minister-President of Hesse; 1991–1999	Succeeded by Roland Koch (CDU)
Preceded by Oskar Lafontaine (SPD)	Minister of Finance of Germany; 1999–2005	Succeeded by Peer Steinbrück (SPD)
