= Hessian Ministry of Higher Education, Research and the Arts =

Government of Hesse

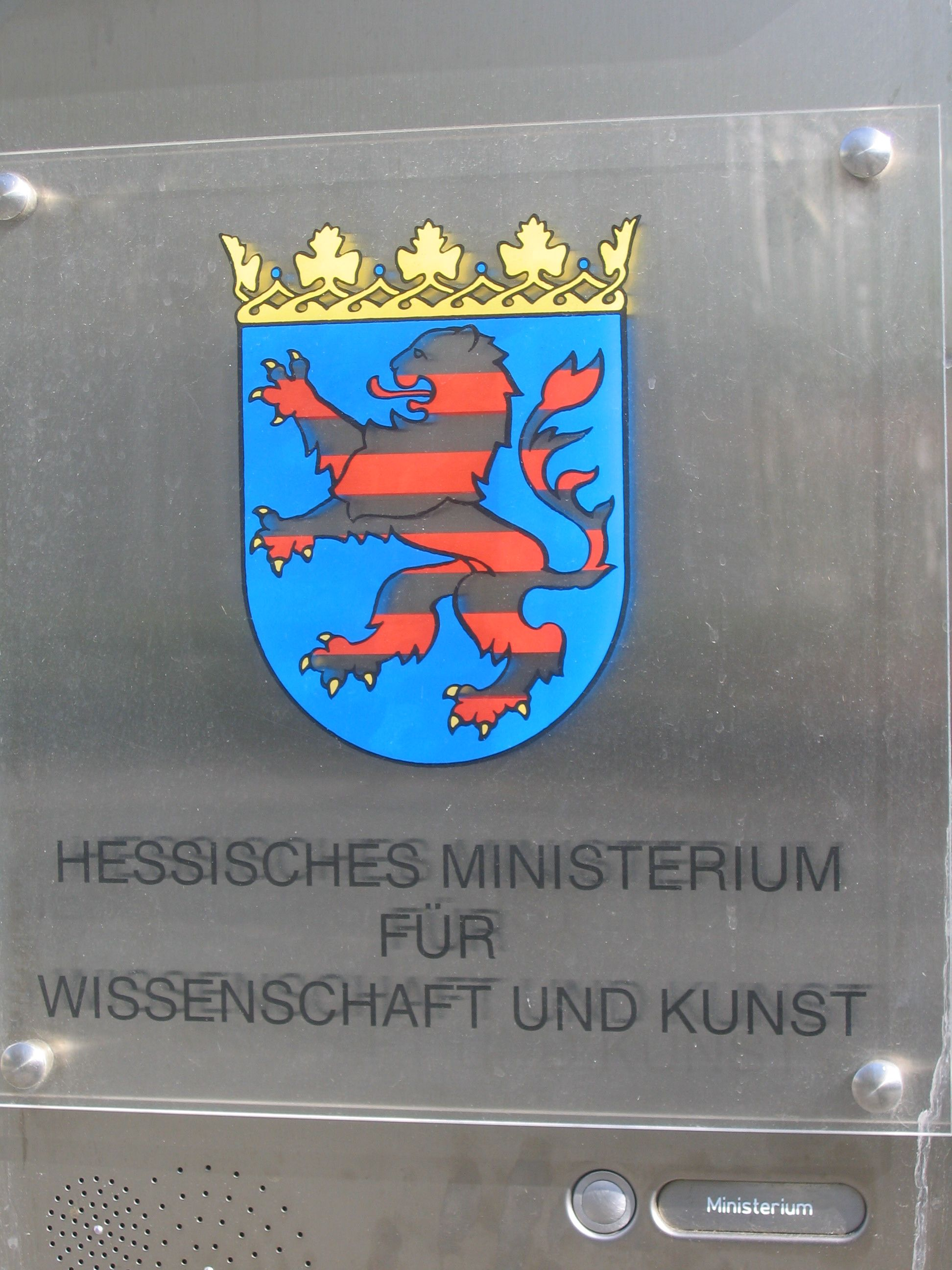

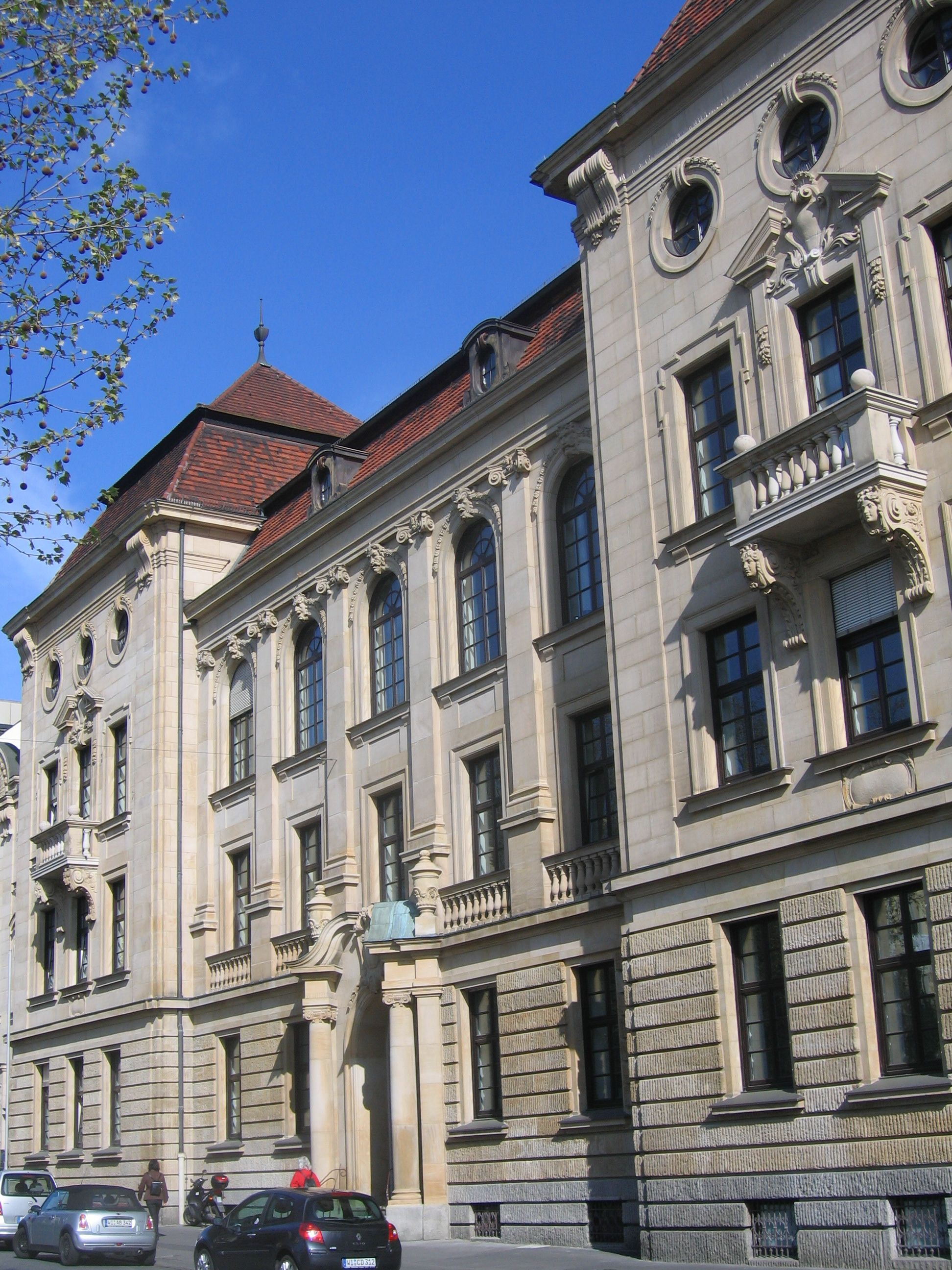
Hessisches Ministerium für Wissenschaft und Kunst in Wiesbaden

The Hessian Ministry of Science and Research, Arts and Culture (German: Hessisches Ministerium für Wissenschaft und Forschung, Kunst und Kultur), abbreviated HMWK, is a university and culture ministry in Hesse, Germany. Since 2024, the minister is Timon Gremmels.

== History ==
Originally called Hessisches Ministerium für Wissenschaft und Kunst, the Ministry was established on 4 July 1984 as a spin-off of the Hessian Ministry of Education. The Ministry of Education was then responsible for school and part of the church affairs.

Since 1987, the Ministry has been located in a rented, Gründerzeit office building between the Rheinstraße and Luisenstraße in Wiesbaden, which was used until 1975 as the Wiesbaden main post-office and was then rebuilt and renovated accordingly.

In 2024, the Ministry was renamed Hessisches Ministerium für Wissenschaft und Forschung, Kunst und Kultur.

It awards the Goethe-Plakette des Landes Hessen.

== Jurisdiction ==
=== Tasks ===
The Ministry is tasked with extending:

- higher education (universities, university hospitals, art, and technical colleges)
- scientific research institutions
- heritage and preservation
- Protection of Cultural Property
- Museums and art collections
- Theater, music and visual arts
- Archives
- Libraries

In general, the Ministry is in charge of technical and legal supervision, and the promotion of science and art in Hesse.

== Sources ==
- Neuer Herr in altem Haus. Festschrift zum Einzug des Hessischen Ministeriums für Wissenschaft und Kunst in die "Alte Post“ in Wiesbaden Rheinstraße 23 – 25 / Luisenstraße 10–12. Ohne Ort. 1987.
- Official website
