= Kurt Sieveking =

German politician

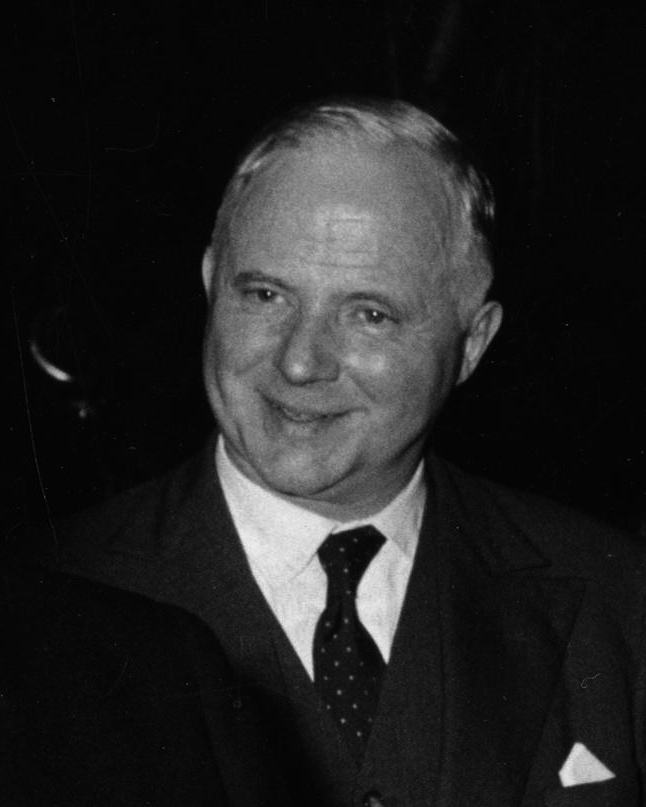
- Sieveking in 1957

First Mayor of Hamburg
- In office 2 December 1953 – 4 December 1957
- Deputy: Edgar Engellhard
- Preceded by: Max Brauer
- Succeeded by: Max Brauer

President of the Bundesrat
- In office 7 September 1956 – 31 October 1957
- Preceded by: Kai-Uwe von Hassel
- Succeeded by: Willy Brandt

Personal details
- Born: 21 December 1897 Hamburg, West Germany
- Died: 16 March 1986 (aged 88) Hamburg, West Germany
- Party: CDU

Kurt Sieveking (21 December 1897, Hamburg – 16 March 1986, Hamburg) was a German politician (CDU) and First Mayor of Hamburg. On 7 September 1956 he was elected for a one-year-term as President of the German Bundesrat. Because his successor-elect, Governing Mayor of Berlin Otto Suhr, had died on 30 August 1957, Sieveking was re-elected as President of the Bundesrat in order to avoid a vacancy. He resigned on 1 November 1957, when Willy Brandt became the new Governing Mayor of Berlin and President of the Bundesrat subsequently. Because of that, Sieveking is, as yet, the only President of the Bundesrat to be re-elected to a second consecutive term (seven other persons have held two non-consecutive one-year-terms).

Sieveking was from a well known Hamburg family, his great-granduncle Friedrich Sieveking preceded him in office as First Mayor in the 1860s. Many streets and places in Hamburg were named after them: e.g. Sievekingsallee, Sievekingdamm or Sievekingsplatz (53°33'19"N 9°58'34"E).

In 1951, Sieveking was appointed as the consul in Stockholm and later ambassador in Sweden. In 1953, Sieveking was the candidate of the conservative parties for the office of the First Mayor. He won the election, in his office term he reformed the school system and initiated the town twinning with Saint Petersburg (then Leningrad) in 1957. After the election defeat he remained member of the Hamburg Parliament.

Sieveking is buried at the Ohlsdorf Cemetery (S25 T25 [11–19]).
