= Peter Altmeier =

German politician (1899–1977)

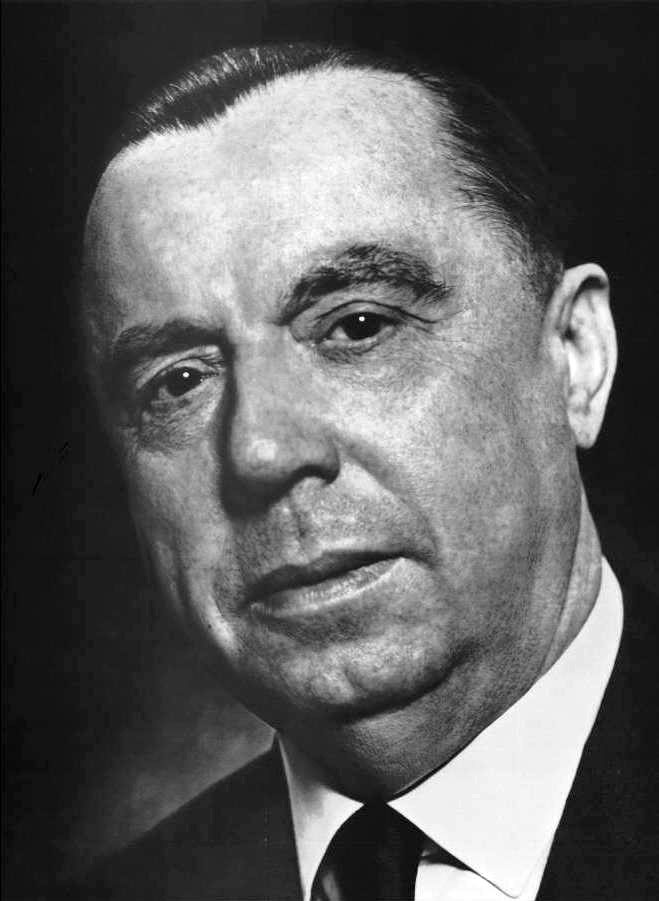
- Peter Altmeier (1963)

Minister President of Rhineland-Palatinate
- In office 1947–1969
- Preceded by: Wilhelm Boden
- Succeeded by: Helmut Kohl

President of the Bundesrat
- In office 1 November 1965 – 31 October 1966
- Preceded by: Georg August Zinn
- Succeeded by: Helmut Lemke
- In office 7 September 1954 – 6 September 1955
- Preceded by: Georg August Zinn
- Succeeded by: Kai-Uwe von Hassel

Personal details
- Born: 12 August 1899 Saarbrücken
- Died: 28 August 1977 (aged 78) Koblenz

Peter Altmeier (12 August 1899 – 28 August 1977) was a German politician (Zentrum, later CDU). From 1947 to 1969, he was the Minister President of Rhineland-Palatinate. He served as the President of the Bundesrat in 1954/55 and 1965/66. He was born in Saarbrücken and died in Koblenz. He was the longest governing German Minister-President in one single state—longest at all was Bernhard Vogel.

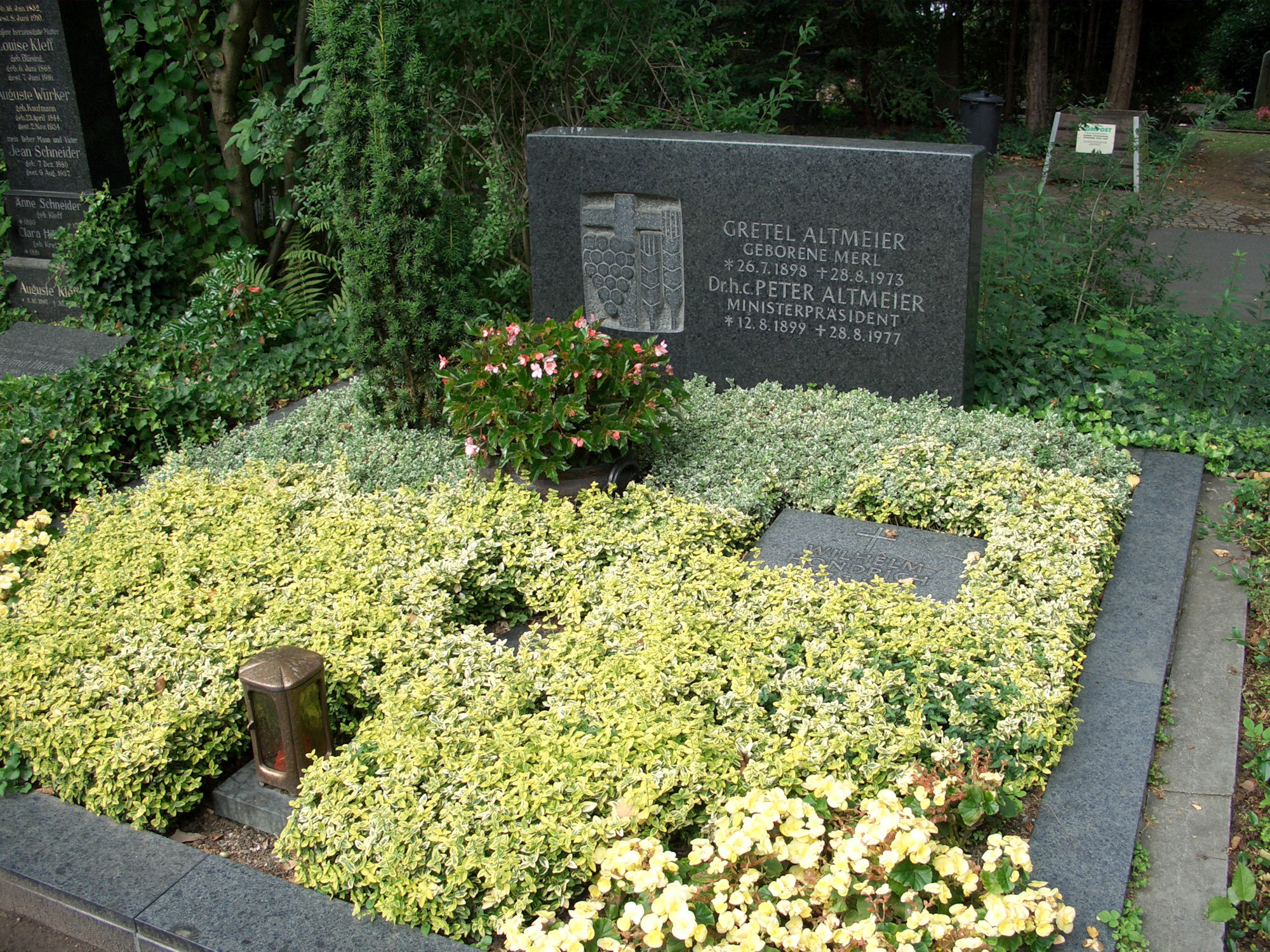
Grave of Peter Altmeier at the cemetery of Koblenz
