= Violetta Bock =

German politician (born 1987)

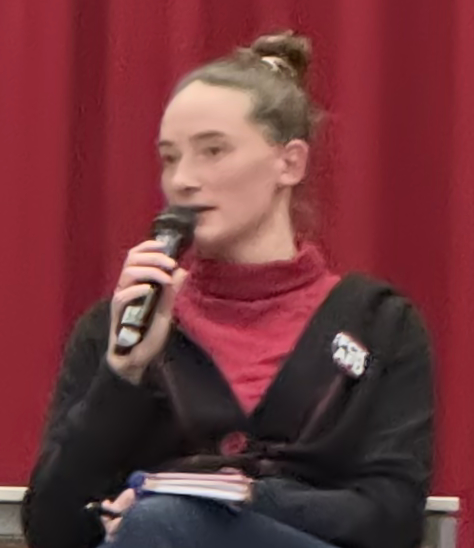
- Bock in 2025

Member of the Bundestag
- Incumbent
- Assumed office 2025
- Constituency: Hesse

Personal details
- Born: 11 December 1987 (age 38) Passau, Germany
- Party: The Left

Violetta Bock (born 11 December 1987) is a German politician and member of the Bundestag. A member of The Left, she has represented Hesse since 2025.

Bock was born on 11 December 1987 in Passau. She has lived in the Kassel district for many years. She has been a city councillor in Kassel since April 2016. She was The Left's candidate in Kassel (constituency 167) at the 2025 federal election but was not elected. She was however elected to the Bundestag on The Left's state list in Hesse.
