= Timon Gremmels =

German politician (born 1976)

- Gremmels in 2020

Minister for Higher Education, Research, Science and the Arts of Hesse
- Incumbent
- Assumed office 18 January 2024
- Minister-President: Boris Rhein
- Preceded by: Angela Dorn-Rancke

Member of the Bundestag; for Kassel
- In office 24 October 2017 – 25 January 2024
- Preceded by: Ulrike Gottschalck
- Succeeded by: Nadine Ruf

Member of the Landtag of Hesse; for Kassel-Land II
- In office 1 November 2009 – 31 October 2017
- Preceded by: Ulrike Gottschalck
- Succeeded by: Manuela Strube

Personal details
- Born: 4 January 1976 (age 50) Marburg, West Germany
- Party: Social Democratic
- Education: Marburg University

Timon Gremmels (born 4 January 1976) is a German politician in the Social Democratic Party (SPD) who has been serving as the State Minister for Higher Education, Research, Science and the Arts in the government of Minister-President Boris Rhein of Hesse since 2024. From 2017 to 2024, he was a Member of the Bundestag for Kassel.

== Education and career ==
After having received his Abitur diploma from Herderschule in Kassel in 1995, Gremmels studied political science with a minor in law and emphasis on peace & conflict studies at Philipps-Universität Marburg, graduating in 2003.

Gremmels worked as a research assistant for Barbara Weiler (SPD), Member of the European Parliament at the time, until 2007. Afterwards, he took the roles of program officer for the regional SPD in Hesse and of advisor to the Social Democratic Association for Local Affairs (Sozial Demokratischen Gemeinschaft für Kommunalpolitik, SGK). In 2008 he moved to the SPD parliamentary group in Hesse as policy advisor on the economy, transportation, energy, regional development, and Europe. Before moving into the Hessian state Parliament in 2009, Gremmels held the corporate social responsibility position on the management board of SMA Solar Technology AG.

== Political career ==
=== Career in local and state politics ===
Gremmels joined the SPD in 1992. He became involved with Jusos, the Working Group of Young Socialists in the SPD, and was the president of Jusos Kassel between 1997 and 2001. In 2002, he was subsequently elected deputy chairman of Jusos in North Hesse. From 1999 to 2011 he sat on the board of the SPD group in North Hesse. Furthermore, Gremmels was the president of the committee for education (SPD-Arbeitsgemeinschaft für Bildung) in the district of North Hesse from 2003 to 2007. Since 2011, he has been a member of the executive committee of the Hessian SPD. In April 2015 he was elected chairman of the local SPD group in Kassel-Land, the Hessian SPD group with the largest number of members.

Gremmels was a Member of the Landtag of Hesse from 1 November 2009 to 31 October 2017. Initially, he acted as a replacement MP for Ulrike Gottschalk. Later, in the 2013 state election he successfully defended the direct mandate of the SPD in Kassel with the state's best first vote result of 47.6%. Most recently, he served as his parliamentary group's spokesman on energy topics and deputy chairman for the Hessian SPD parliamentary group. From 2001 until 2013 Gremmels was a member of the municipal council of his hometown Niestetal and, among other roles, deputy chairman of the local SPD parliamentary group. Since 2001, Gremmels has been a part of Kassel's county council (Landkreis Kassel).

=== Member of the German Parliament (2017–2024) ===
In November 2016, Gremmels was nominated as SPD candidate for the Kassel constituency. He was elected to the Bundestag in the 2017 general election where he secured 35.5% of the first vote in his constituency. Thus he moved to the 19th Bundestag as a directly elected parliamentarian.

In parliament, Gremmels served on the Committee on Economic Affairs and Energy and on the Committee on Petitions. In this capacity, he was his parliamentary group's rapporteur on efficient energy use.

In the negotiations to form a coalition government of the Christian Democratic Union (CDU) and the SPD following the 2023 state elections in Hesse, Gremmels was part of his party's delegation.

Gremmels resigned in 2024, and was replaced by Nadine Ruf.

=== Career in state government ===
In the negotiations to form a Grand Coalition under the leadership of Friedrich Merz's Christian Democrats (CDU together with the Bavarian CSU) and the SPD following the 2025 German elections, Gremmels was part of the SPD delegation in the working group on cultural affairs and media, led by Christiane Schenderlein, Volker Ullrich and Carsten Brosda.

== Other activities ==
=== Government agencies ===
- Federal Network Agency for Electricity, Gas, Telecommunications, Post and Railway (BNetzA), Member of the Advisory Board (since 2022)

=== Non-profit organizations ===
- German Academy for Language and Literature, Ex-Officio Member of the Board of Trustees (since 2024)
- Business Forum of the Social Democratic Party of Germany, Member of the Political Advisory Board (since 2020)
- Europa-Union Deutschland, Member
- IG Metall, Member
- Workers' Welfare Association (AWO), Member

== See also ==
- Profile Bundestag
- Website Timon Gremmels
- Timon Gremmels on abgeordnetenwatch.de
