= Wilhelm Boden =

German lawyer, civil servant and politician (1890–1961)

Minister President of Rhineland-Palatinate
- In office 1 December 1946 – 9 July 1947
- Preceded by: Office established
- Succeeded by: Peter Altmeier

Personal details
- Born: 5 March 1890 Grumbach, Germany
- Died: 18 October 1961 (aged 71) Birnbach, Germany
- Education: University of Bonn & University of Berlin
- Occupation: Lawyer, civil servant, politician

Wilhelm Boden (5 March 1890 – 18 October 1961) was a German lawyer, civil servant and politician (Centre Party & CDU). From 1946 to 1947 he was the first Minister President of Rhineland-Palatinate.

He contributed substantially to the rebuilding of the administration and to the formation of the state of Rhineland-Palatinate, where he continued former Prussian administrative traditions. On 1 December 1946, Boden was appointed by the French military government as prime minister of the "Provisional Government" of Rheinland-Pfalz with the mission to prepare a draft constitution and conduct elections. After the election on 18 May 1947 he became minister president of a "transitional Cabinet" but failed to form a government; the SPD denied him the coalition as he was considered controversial even within the party, so the leadership of the affairs of the newly created state passed to Peter Altmeier.

== Early life ==
Boden was born on 5 March 1890 in Grumbach in the district Birkenfeld. Wilhelm Boden was the fourth of the seven children of the notary Constantin Boden and his wife Emilie. In 1894 the family moved to the city of Trier, where William also attended the humanistic Gymnasium. Subsequently, he studied law and political science at the University of Bonn and University of Berlin.

== Career ==
After earning a doctorate, Boden began his career as a court assessor in Cologne and subsequently from 1917 he served as an assessor in multiple city administrations including Cologne, Düsseldorf and Essen.

He soon garnered praise and became well known for being a "(in German) 'hochqualifizierter, überdurchschnittlicher Verwaltungsjurist' [highly qualified and above average jurist]". In October 1919, Boden was appointed the Landrat (district administrator) of Altenkirchen. For several years he was the youngest district head in the Prussian state. Apart from this activity, Borden was very successful in politics as well.

From 1919 to 1920, and again from 1929 to 1933, he was a member of the provincial Landtag of the Rhine Province. Between 1931 and 1932, he served as an alternate member of the Prussian State Council. From April 1932 to October 1933, he was a deputy of the Landtag of Prussia.

With the coming to power of the Nazis, Boden's career was initially ended. He was relieved of his offices and retired. Despite being prosecuted and defamed by the Nazis and bombed twice in 1942 and 1944, the family survived the reign of terror.

In April 1945, Boden was reinstated as head of the district Altenkirchen. However, his time in Altenkirchen was quickly over when on 6 June 1945 he was appointed district president of Koblenz. Even when the French took over the occupation zone, Boden was in office. In November 1945, the formation of a province Rhineland-Hesse-Nassau was decided and implemented on 2 January 1946, where Wilhelm Boden served as upper president. The further development that led to the founding of the state of Rhineland-Palatinate, now went much more quickly.

By Regulation No. 57, the new state was created on 30 August 1946 and the name of Boden from the beginning was proposed for the position of Minister president.

After his proposals on the composition of the Cabinet had been accepted by of the French military authorities, Wilhelm Boden was appointed the first Minister President of Rhineland-Palatinate on 1 December 1946. In his new role, Borden headed the All Party Cabinet, who led the political affairs during the sessions of the country's Constituent Assembly. Borden was primarily a highly qualified management expert who was but with his appearance—in tailcoat and Stehkragen—particularly by the correctness of his office and his work, a formative personality. He strove to form a government but the attempt was a failure. Not only with the other parties, but even in the CDU itself the difficulties and resistance grew against the new government under Boden.

Being an experienced and highly qualified jurist he had brought his knowledge and skills in various political bodies from before the Second World War. In this extensive experience, the occupying powers of Rhineland-Pfalz intervened after the war immediately so that Boden from the outset was instrumental in the reconstruction of the country. As the first appointed Minister president, Boden accompanied the elaboration of the Constitution and its adoption by referendum. On 8 July 1947, he announced his resignation. After Boden resigned as Minister president, Peter Altmeier was unanimously elected as the new Minister president in Rhineland-Palatinate.

From 1947 to 1959 Boden served as the president of the Landeszentralbank in Rheinland-Pfalz.

== Death ==
Boden remained a member of the Rhineland-Palatinate regional parliament until his death in the year 1961.

== Honors ==
In 1953, Boden was decorated with the Grand Cross of the Order of Merit of the Federal Republic of Germany.
