= Franz-Josef Röder =

German politician (1909–1979)

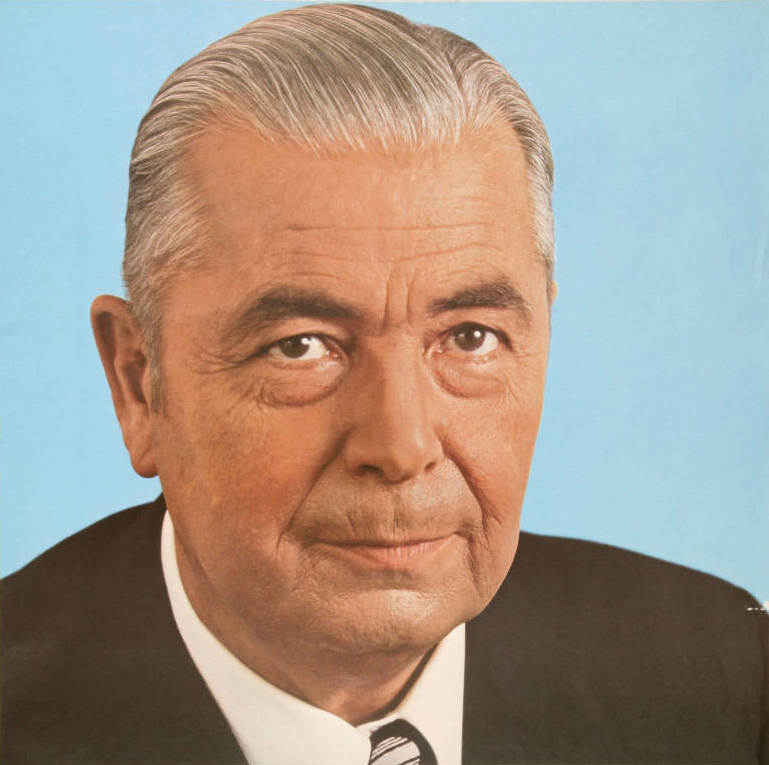
- Röder in 1972

Minister-President of Saarland
- In office 23 April 1959 – 26 June 1979
- Preceded by: Egon Reinert
- Succeeded by: Werner Zeyer

President of the Bundesrat
- In office 1 November 1959 – 31 October 1960
- Preceded by: Wilhelm Kaisen
- Succeeded by: Franz Meyers
- In office 1 November 1969 – 31 October 1970
- Preceded by: Herbert Weichmann
- Succeeded by: Hans Koschnick

Personal details
- Born: 22 July 1909 Merzig, German Empire
- Died: 26 June 1979 (aged 69) Saarbrücken, West Germany
- Party: NSDAP (1933–1945); CDU (from 1945)
- Occupation: Politician

Franz-Josef Röder (22 July 1909 in Merzig – 26 June 1979 in Saarbrücken) was a German politician of the CDU and from 1959 to 1979 Minister President of Saarland. He had been a member of the Nazi Party from 1933 to 1945.

== Affiliation to various branches of the Nazi Party ==
Röder was closely associated with the seven branches of the NSDAP (Nationalsozialistische Deutsche Arbeiterpartei), the NSKK (Nationalsozialistisches Kraftfahrcorps), the NS (Nationalsozialistischer Lehrerbund), DF (Deutsche Front), Ordnungsdienst (Nazi street-fighter unit under SS leadership), and the SA (Sturmabteilung, forbidden at that time by the League of Nations). According to his father, he also held an unspecified leadership function with the Hitler Youth. He became a member of these militant organizations in 1933 and 1934, prior to the official Nazi takeover of the Saar region of Germany in 1935, when the Saarlanders made their decision to join with Hitler's terror regime, a decision in which Röder played an important part by luring his fellow Saarlanders to neglect any reticence against the abolition of human rights. As such, his militancy in these groups was a personal choice rather than an acquiescence to political pressure. This is further evident in an archived letter from his father dating to 1937, which described his personal and family merits in promoting Nazionalsozialismus in the Saar region. Further, there is a notice on Röder's NSDAP membership card showing his transfer from his hometown Neunkirchen NSDAP to The Hague underground branch of the NSDAP, which was illegal under international law at the time. When Röder died in 1979, the Dutch ambassador in Bonn, Baron Diederic van Lynden, wrote an official letter of condolence which excluded the period of time between 1940 and 1944, during which Röder was working as an occupation official under the orders of convicted war criminal (at the Nuremberg trials) Arthur Seyss-Inquart, demonstrating that Röder then was a well known negative element in the Dutch-German relations. Still, in 1944, he was decorated by Nazi authorities with the Kriegsverdienstkreuz ohne Schwerter for "special merits", an "honour" which he never explained. In his denazification procedures, he was found in the first instance to be guilty, then in a later general amnesty reduced to "less guilty". During his years in power after 1955, he largely favoured the return of old NSDAP members in all government cultural and political functions of all levels and made sure that none of the group of the former opponents to Hitler could ever take an influential office again.
