= Werner Zeyer =

Minister-President of Saarland from 1979 to 1985

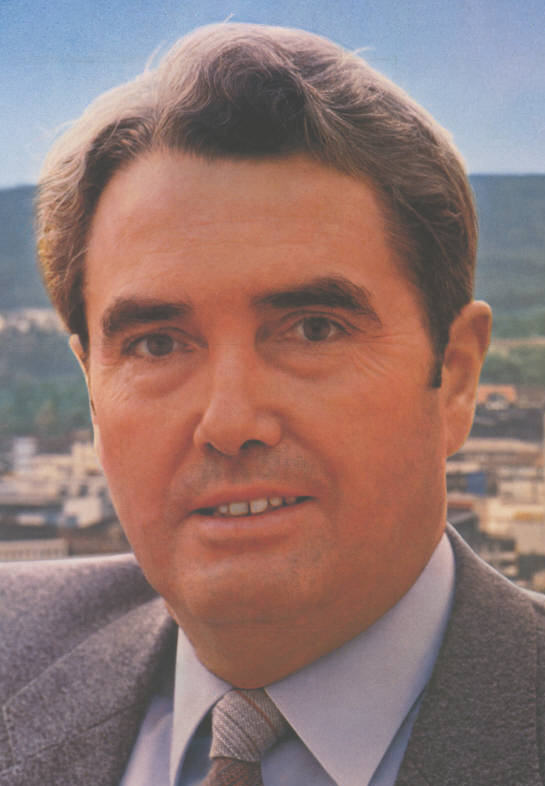
- Zeyer in 1980

Minister-President of Saarland
- In office 5 July 1979 – 9 April 1985
- Preceded by: Franz-Josef Röder
- Succeeded by: Oskar Lafontaine

President of the Bundesrat
- In office 1 November 1980 – 31 October 1981
- Preceded by: Hans-Ulrich Klose
- Succeeded by: Hans Koschnick

Personal details
- Born: Werner Zeyer; 25 May 1929 Oberthal, Weimar Republic (now Germany)
- Died: 26 March 2000 (aged 70) Saarbrücken, Saarland, Germany
- Party: Christian Democratic Union
- Spouse: Edith Zeyer
- Children: 3
- Relatives: Alexander Zeyer (grandson)
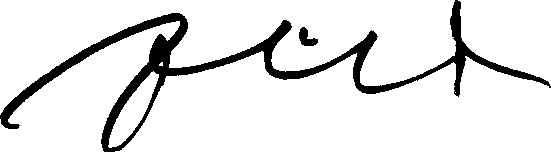
- Signature

Werner Zeyer (25 May 1929 – 26 March 2000) was a German politician of the Christian Democratic Union (CDU) who served as Minister-President of Saarland from 1979 to 1985.
