= Matthias Nölke =

German politician (born 1980)

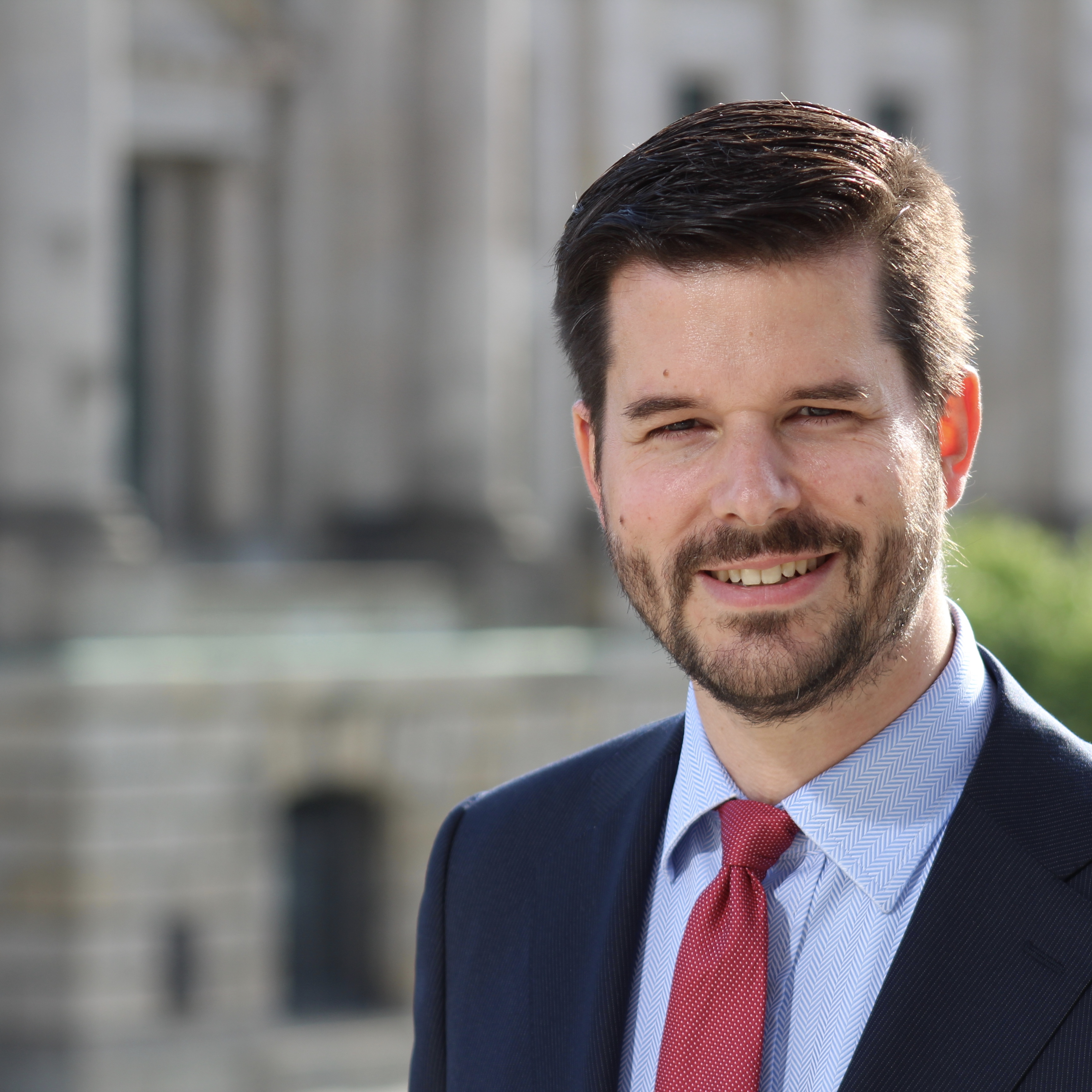
- Nölke in 2020

Member of the Bundestag for Hesse
- Incumbent
- Assumed office 28 April 2020
- Constituency: FDP List

Personal details
- Born: 8 January 1980 (age 46) Kassel, West Germany
- Party: Free Democratic Party
- Education: University of Göttingen

Matthias Nölke (born 8 January 1980) is a German jurist and politician of the Free Democratic Party (FDP) who served as a member of the Bundestag from the state of Hesse from 2020 to 2021.

== Political career ==
Nölke became a member of the Bundestag in 2020 when he replaced Stefan Ruppert who had resigned. In parliament, he served on the Committee on Labour and Social Affairs.

In addition to his committee assignments, Nölke served as deputy chairman of the Parliamentary Friendship Group for Relations with the Baltic States from 2020 to 2021.
