= 1999 Hessian state election =

State election in Hesse, Germany

1999 Hesse state election
- 7 February 1999

All 110 seats of the Landtag of Hesse 56 seats needed for a majority
- Turnout: 2,800,371 (66.4%) ▲0.1%
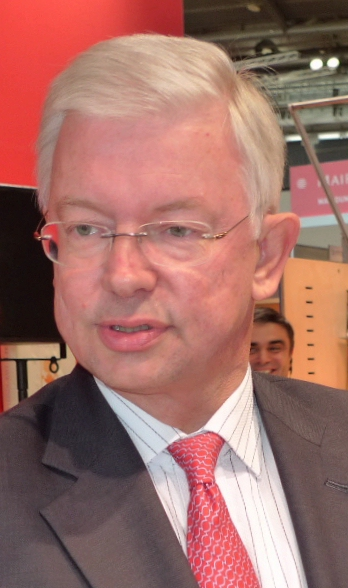

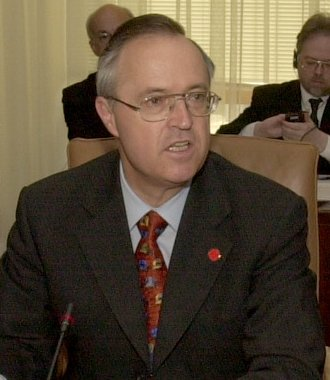

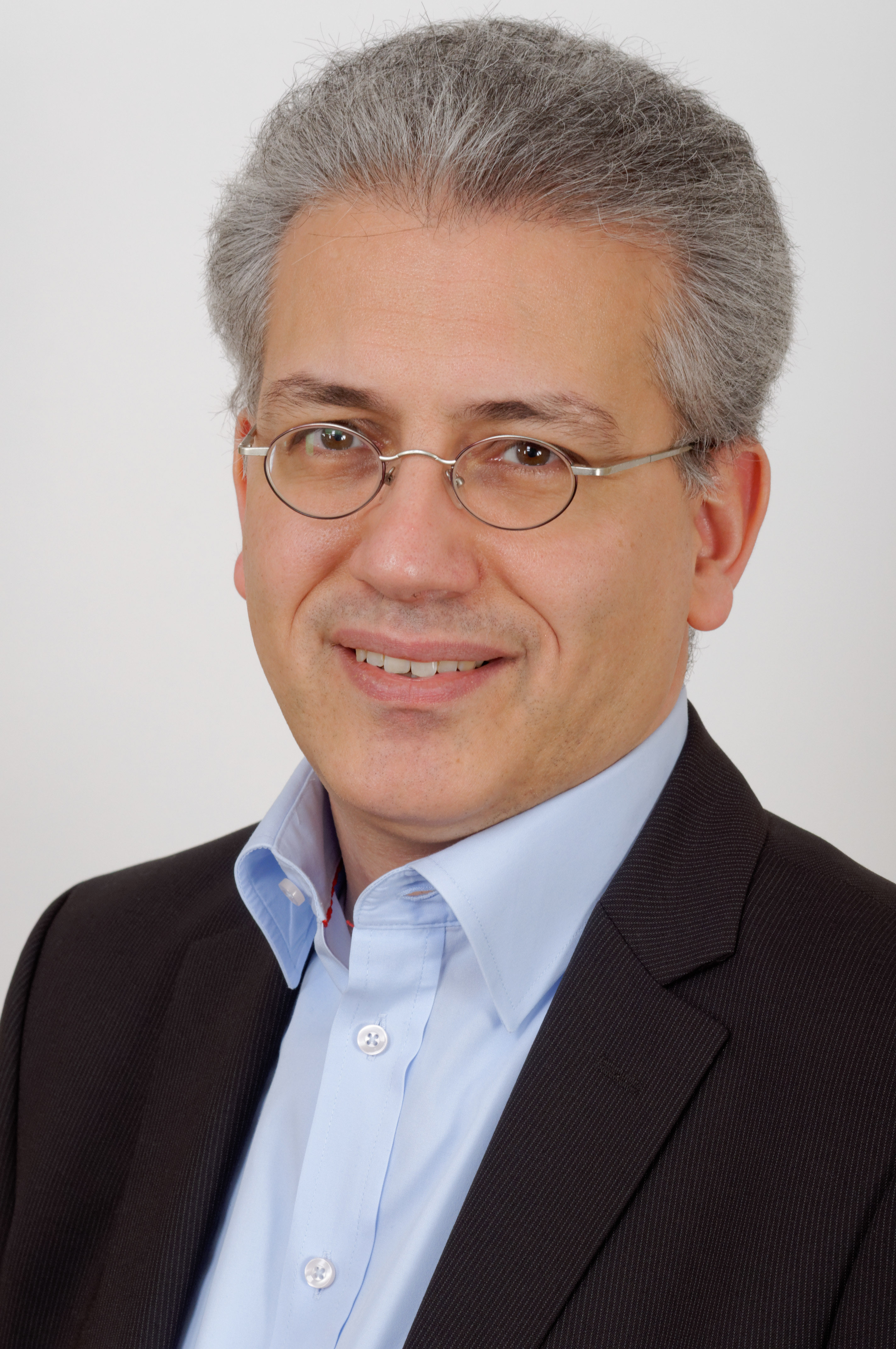

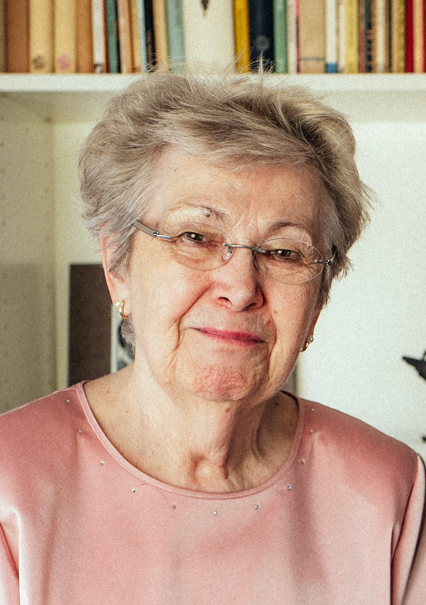
	First party	Second party
Leader	Roland Koch	Hans Eichel
Party	CDU	SPD
Last election	45 seats, 39.2%	44 seats, 38.0%
Seats won	50	46
Seat change	▲5	▲2
Popular vote	1,215,783	1,102,544
Percentage	43.4%	39.4%
Swing	▲4.2%	▲1.4%
	Third party	Fourth party
Leader	Evelin Schönhut-Keil; Tarek Al-Wazir	Ruth Wagner
Party	Greens	FDP
Last election	13 seats, 11.2%	8 seats, 7.4%
Seats won	8	6
Seat change	▼5	▼2
Popular vote	201,194	142,845
Percentage	7.2%	5.1%
Swing	▼4.0%	▼2.3%
- Results for the single-member constituencies.
Minister-President before election
Hans Eichel
SPD
Elected Minister-President
Roland Koch
CDU

The 1999 Hessian state election was held on 7 February 1999 to elect the members of the 15th Landtag of Hesse. The outgoing government was a coalition of the Social Democratic Party (SPD) and The Greens led by Minister-President Hans Eichel.

The government was unexpectedly defeated, with the opposition Christian Democratic Union (CDU) winning a comfortable plurality and forming a one-seat majority coalition with the Free Democratic Party (FDP). This was despite prior opinion polling indicating the SPD and Greens would be re-elected comfortably and increase their majority. CDU leader Roland Koch was elected Minister-President by the Landtag in early April.

== Parties ==
The table below lists parties represented in the previous Landtag of Hesse.

Name		Ideology	Leader(s)	1995 result	
Name		Ideology	Leader(s)	Votes (%)	Seats
CDU	Christian Democratic Union of Germany; Christlich Demokratische Union Deutschlands	Christian democracy	Roland Koch	39.2%	45 / 110
SPD	Social Democratic Party of Germany; Sozialdemokratische Partei Deutschlands	Social democracy	Hans Eichel	38.0%	44 / 110
Grüne	Alliance 90/The Greens; Bündnis 90/Die Grünen	Green politics	Priska Hinz; Rupert von Plottnitz	11.2%	13 / 110
FDP	Free Democratic Party; Freie Demokratische Partei	Classical liberalism	Ruth Wagner	7.4%	8 / 110

== Opinion polling ==
Polling firm	Fieldwork date	Sample size	CDU	SPD	Grüne	FDP	Others	Lead
1999 state election	7 February 1999	–	43.4	39.4	7.2	5.1	4.9	4.0
Polis	30 Jan 1999	1,016	36	41	10	8	5	5
Forschungsgruppe Wahlen	25–28 Jan 1999	1,025	39	42	8.5	5.5	5	3
Infratest dimap	18–24 Jan 1999	1,000	37.5	42	10	7	3.5	4.5
Forsa	20 Jan 1999	?	36	40	11	7	6	4
Forsa	14 Jan 1999	?	37	38	12	7	6	1
Infratest dimap	4–10 Jan 1999	1,000	39	42	9	6	4	3
Forschungsgruppe Wahlen	30 Nov–3 Dec 1998	1,011	37	45	9	4	5	8
Forschungsgruppe Wahlen	2–5 Nov 1998	1,021	38	43	10	4	5	5
1995 state election	19 February 1995	–	39.2	38.0	11.2	7.4	4.3	1.2

== Campaign ==
During the campaign, the CDU collected signatures opposing the federal government's plan to relax Germany's high standards for dual citizenship, which drew accusations of xenophobia.

== Election result ==
Party	Constituency			Party list				Total seats	+/-
Party	Votes	%	Seats	Votes	%	+/-	Seats	Total seats	+/-
Christian Democratic Union	1,265,942	45.34	34	1,215,783	43.42	+4.26	16	50	▲5
Social Democratic Party	1,158,663	41.50	21	1,102,544	39.37	+1.40	25	46	▲2
Alliance 90/The Greens	168,325	6.03	0	201,194	7.18	-4.01	8	8	▼5
Free Democratic Party	98,095	3.51	0	142,845	5.10	-2.35	6	6	▼2
The Republicans	79,273	2.84	0	75,114	2.68	+0.70	0	0	0
Human Environment Animal Protection Party	2,056	0.07	0	12,856	0.46	New	0	0	New
League of Free Citizens	8,760	0.31	0	10,811	0.39	+0.08	0	0	0
Free Voters	405	0.01	0	10,057	0.36	New	0	0	New
Feminist Party of Germany	1,745	0.06	0	6,691	0.24	New	0	0	New
National Democratic Party	2,231	0.08	0	5,933	0.21	-0.07	0	0	0
Party of Bible-abiding Christians	2,164	0.08	0	4,999	0.18	-0.06	0	0	0
German Communist Party	1,181	0.04	0	3,881	0.14	+0.02	0	0	0
Natural Law Party	1,515	0.05	0	2,499	0.09	-0.07	0	0	0
Ecological Democratic Party	138	0.00	0	2,053	0.07	-0.12	0	0	0
Party of Willing Workers and Disadvantaged	95	0.00	0	1,909	0.07	New	0	0	0
Civil Rights Movement Soliarity	627	0.02	0	612	0.02	0.00	0	0	0
German Homeland Party	91	0.00	0	591	0.02	-0.01	0	0	0
Independents	540	0.02	0	–				0	0
Total	2,791,846	100.00	55	2,800,372	100.00		55	110	0
Invalid	53,740	1.89		45,214	1.59				
Turnout	2,845,586	66.45		2,845,586	66.45	+0.18			
Registered voters	4,282,397			4,282,397					

== Sources ==
- The Federal Returning Officer
