= Alexander Zeyer =

German politician (born 1993)

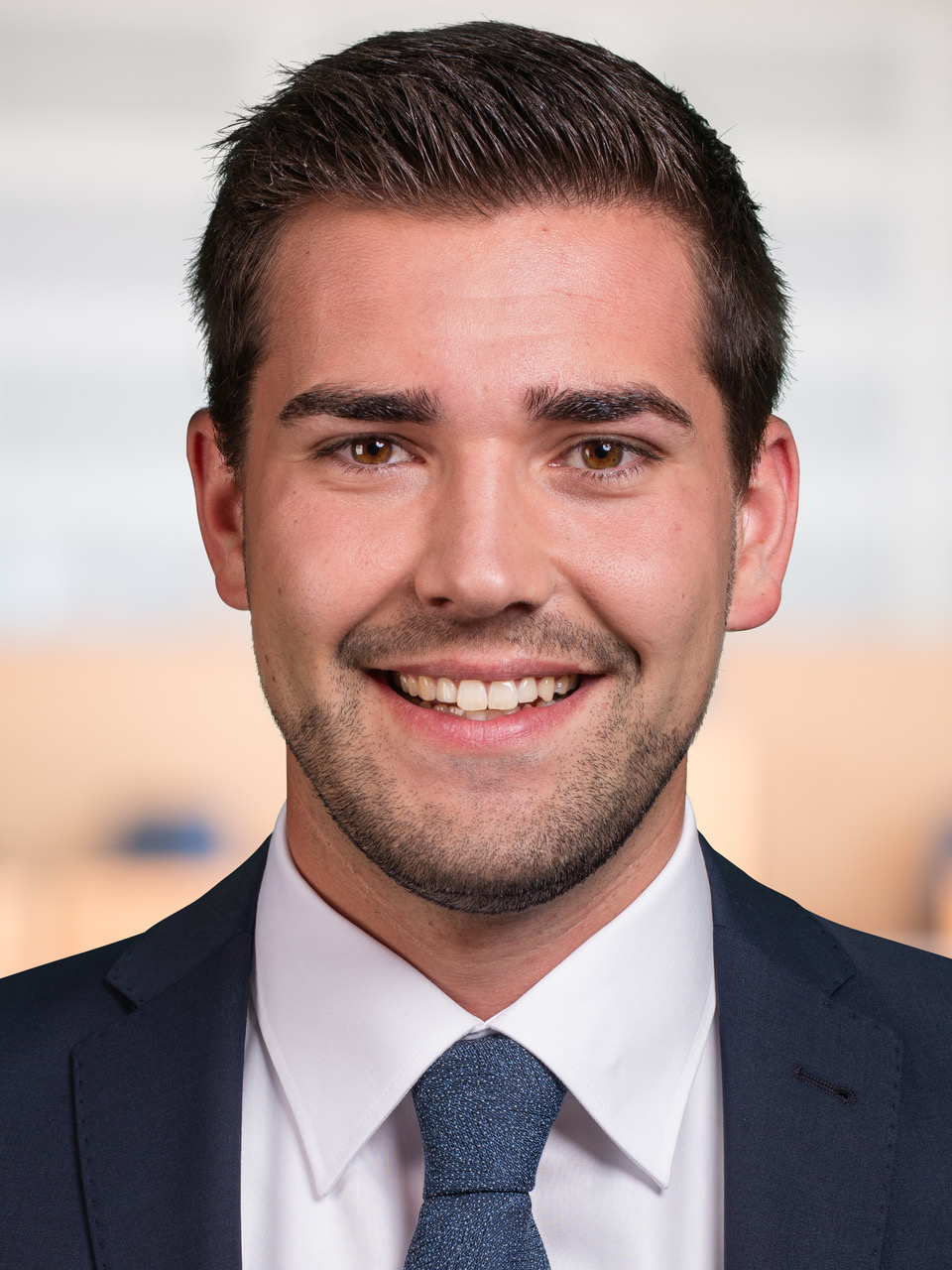
- Zeyer in 2016

Member of the Landtag of Saarland
- In office 25 April 2017 – 30 October 2019
- Succeeded by: Ulrich Schnur

Personal details
- Born: 20 March 1993 (age 33)
- Party: Christian Democratic Union
- Relatives: Werner Zeyer (grandfather)

Alexander Zeyer (born 20 March 1993) is a German politician. From 2017 to 2019, he was a member of the Landtag of Saarland. From 2019 to 2022, served as spokesperson of the Hans cabinet. He is the grandson of Werner Zeyer.
