= Nicole Maisch =

German politician

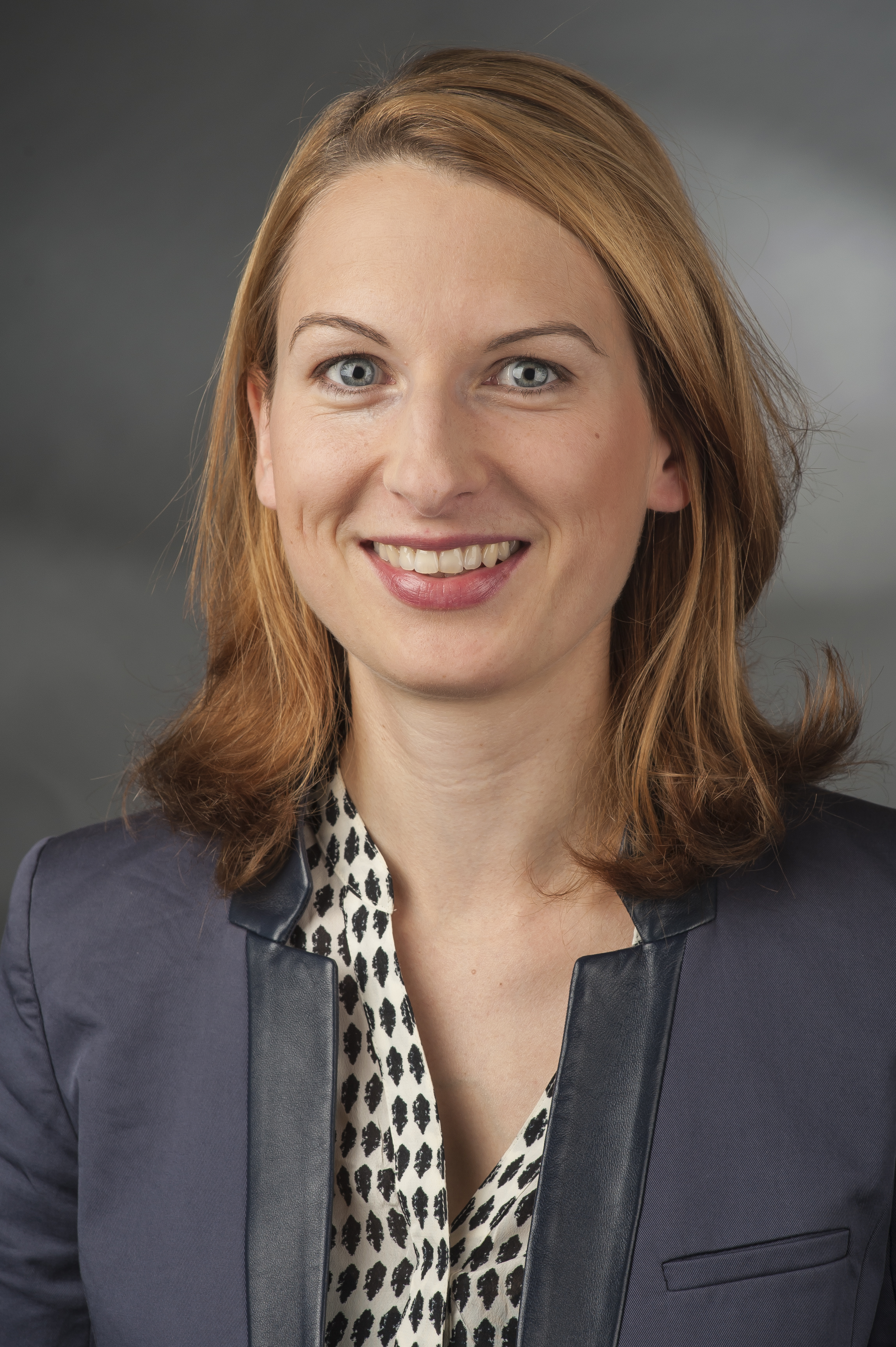
Maisch in 2014

Nicole Maisch is a German politician from the Alliance 90/The Greens in Hesse. She was member of the Bundestag from 2007 to 2017, by succeeding Matthias Berninger after he resigned in 2007 and then by getting a seat in the 2009 and 2013 Federal Election.

== Biography ==
=== Early life and education ===
Maisch was born on 20 April 1981 in Hanau, Hesse. In 2000, she graduated from the Franziskanergymnasium Kreuzburg in Großkrotzenburg. From 2000 to 2001, she studied Media Studies, Political Science and English Studies at the University of Trier. She then moved to the University of Kassel, where she studied sociology and continued her political science and English Studies. She graduated with a Master of Arts in 2006 and worked as a tutor for political theory for some time.

=== Political Work ===
In the 2000s, Maisch started her political career. She worked as a constituency advisor for Antje Vollmer from 2004 to 2005 and for Sigrid Erfurth from 2005 to 2007. From April 2004 to June 2007 she was the State Chairwoman of the "Green Youth of Hesse". At her university, she was a founding member of the Green University Group of Kassel (Kasseler Grünen-Hochschulgruppe) and worked as an AStA officer. She was also member of the North Hesse Regional Planning Assembly (in April 2007) and had a seat in the Kassel City Council from April 2006 to June 2007.

==== Bundestag ====
Maisch entered the Bundestag in 2007 as Matthias Berninger's successor, after he resigned in February for personal reasons. There she was the spokesperson for Consumer protection policy of the Greens. From February 2010 to September 2013, Maisch was the chairwoman of the Committee on Food, Agriculture and Consumer Protection. She also contributed to the Committee on nutrition und agriculture. In 2017, after ten years as a member of parliament, she announced that she did not want to run for office again for personal reasons and wanted to devote herself to other tasks.

==== Europe Direct NordOstHessen ====
After her time in the Bundestag, she worked for the EU programme Europe Direct NordOstHessen of the Regierungsbezirk Kassel.

==== Organizations ====
Maisch is a member of ver.di, BUND and the Verkehrsclub Deutschland.

=== Private Life ===
Maisch has four children. She is a vegetarian and likes Indie Music.
