= Georg Diederichs =

Minister president of lower saxony, germany

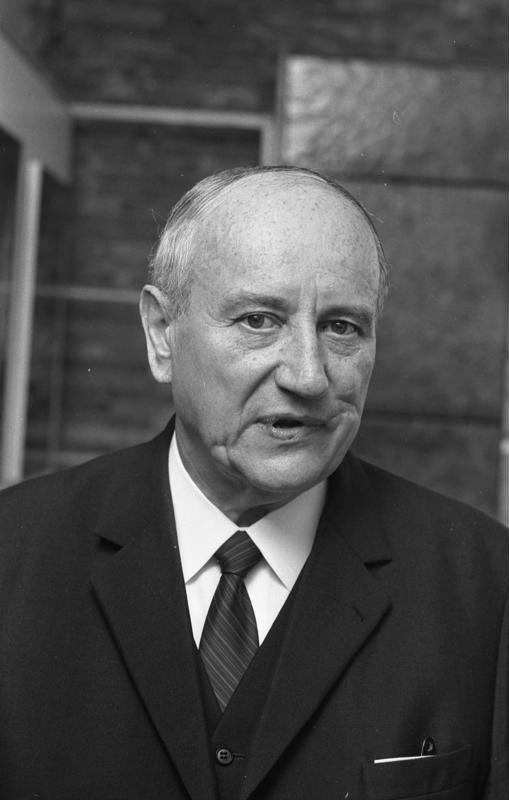
Georg Diederichs, 1969

Georg Diederichs (2 September 1900 – 19 June 1983) was a German politician who served as Minister President of Lower Saxony from 1961 to 1970. A member of the Social Democratic Party (SPD), he had previously served as Vice President of the Lower Saxony State Parliament from 1955 to 1957 and as State Minister of Social Affairs from 1957 to 1961.

He was born at Northeim and died in Hanover.
