= Niestetal =

- Municipality
- Coat of arms

- Location of Niestetal within Kassel district
- Interactive map of Niestetal
- Location within Germany Location within Hesse
- Coordinates: 51°19′N 09°34′E
- Country: Germany
- State: Hesse
- Admin. region: Kassel
- District: Kassel

Government
  - Mayor (2024–30): Marcel Brückmann (SPD)

Area
  - Total: 22.15 km^{2} (8.55 sq mi)
- Elevation: 221 m (725 ft)

Population (2025-12-31)
  - Total: 11,111
  - Density: 501.6/km^{2} (1,299/sq mi)
- Time zone: UTC+01:00 (CET)
  - Summer (DST): UTC+02:00 (CEST)
- Postal codes: 34266
- Dialling codes: 0561
- Vehicle registration: KS
- Website: www.niestetal.de

Niestetal is a municipality in the district of Kassel, in Hesse, Germany. It is situated on the eastern bank of the Fulda, 4 km east of Kassel (centre).
