= Baden-Württemberg International =

Agency based in Stuttgart

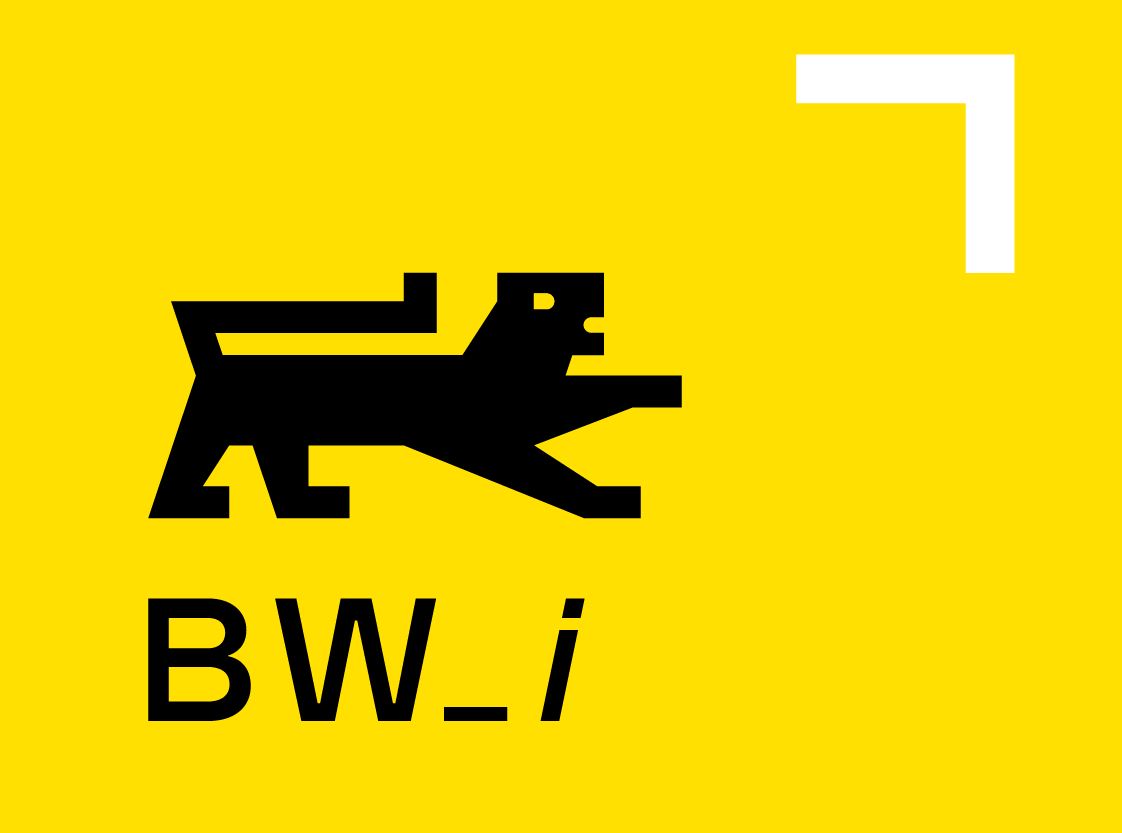
- Company type: GmbH (Private company)
- Founded: 1984
- Headquarters: Stuttgart, Germany
- Area served: Worldwide
- Key people: Gunnar Mey (CEO)
- Services: Economic development
- Number of employees: 100
- Website: www.bw-i.de/en

Baden-Württemberg International, agency for international economic and scientific cooperation (BW_i), based in Stuttgart, is the centre of competence of the German state of Baden-Württemberg for the internationalisation of business and science. BW_i is responsible for supporting Baden-Württemberg companies in opening up foreign markets and optimally positioning the southwest German business and science location.

== History ==
BW_i was established as the "Baden-Württemberg Export Foundation" by the former Prime Minister of Baden-Württemberg Lothar Späth (CDU) in 1984 to support companies in opening up foreign markets. The transfer of the business activity into the legal form of a GmbH took place in 1990. Since 2004, the company has operated under the name Baden-Württemberg International, agency for international economic and scientific cooperation.

== Responsibilities ==
As Baden-Württemberg's centre of excellence for the internationalisation of business and science, the company supports domestic and foreign companies and clusters, research institutions and universities, as well as regions and municipalities in their internationalisation efforts. In addition, the state company supports Baden-Württemberg companies in opening up foreign markets.

== Shareholders ==
- State of Baden-Württemberg
- L-Bank, Landeskreditbank Baden-Württemberg
- Federation of Industry of the State of Baden-Württemberg
- Association of Chambers of Commerce and Industry of Baden-Württemberg
- Baden-Württembergischer Handwerkstag

== Committees ==
=== Supervisory Board ===
- Nicole Hoffmeister-Kraut, Ministry of Economic Affairs, Labour and Tourism of Baden-Württemberg (chairwoman)
- Petra Olschowski, Minister of Science, Research and Arts of Baden-Württemberg (deputy chairwoman)

=== Advisory board ===
- Wolfram Ressel, Rector of the University of Stuttgart, Advisory Board for Science, Research and Arts (chairman)

== Foreign subsidiary ==
- Baden-Württemberg Economic and Scientific Cooperation (Nanjing) Co., Ltd., China
