= Third Bouffier cabinet =

State government of Hesse

Third Cabinet of Volker Bouffier Bouffier III
- 22nd Cabinet of Hesse
- 18 January 2019 – 30 May 2022
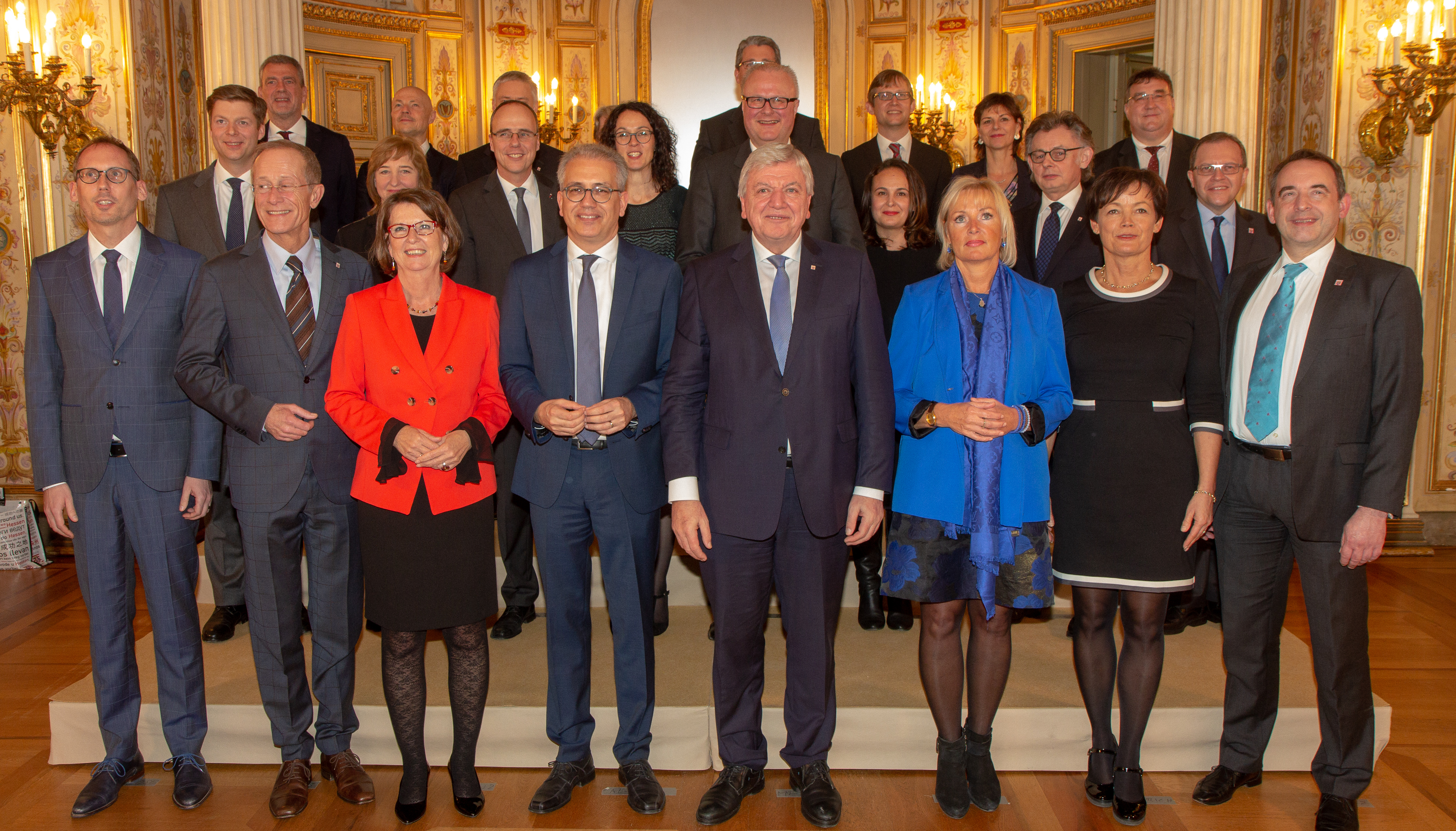
- The third Bouffier cabinet, including state secretaries, at the constituent session of the Landtag of Hesse on 18 January 2019. Front row (L to R): Kai Klose, Axel Wintermeyer, Priska Hinz, Tarek Al-Wazir, Volker Bouffier, Kristina Sinemus, Lucia Puttrich, R. Alexander Lorz Middle row (L to R): Stefan Heck, Eva Kühne-Hörmann, Peter Beuth, Angela Dorn-Rancke, Thomas Schäfer, Ayse Asar, Michael Bußer, Thomas Metz
- Date formed: 18 January 2019
- Date dissolved: 30 May 2022

People and organisations
- Minister-President: Volker Bouffier
- Deputy Minister-President: Tarek Al-Wazir
- No. of ministers: 11
- Member parties: Christian Democratic Union; Alliance 90/The Greens
- Status in legislature: Coalition government (Majority); 69 / 137 (50%)
- Opposition parties: Social Democratic Party; Alternative for Germany; Free Democratic Party; The Left

History
- Election: 2018 Hessian state election
- Legislature term: 20th Landtag of Hesse
- Predecessor: Second Bouffier cabinet
- Successor: First Rhein cabinet

The Third Bouffier cabinet was the state government of Hesse between 2019 and 2022, sworn in on 18 January 2019 after Volker Bouffier was elected as Minister-President of Hesse by the members of the Landtag of Hesse. It was the 22nd Cabinet of Hesse.

It was formed after the 2018 Hessian state election by the Christian Democratic Union (CDU) and Alliance 90/The Greens (GRÜNE). Excluding the Minister-President, the cabinet comprised eleven ministers. Seven were members of the CDU and four were members of the Greens.

After Bouffier's resignation as Minister-President, the third Bouffier cabinet was succeeded by the First Rhein cabinet on 31 May 2022.

== Formation ==
The previous cabinet was a coalition government of the CDU and the Greens led by Minister-President Volker Bouffier of the CDU.

The election took place on 28 October 2018, and resulted in significant losses for the CDU, while the Greens became the second-largest party for the first time by a margin of less than 100 votes. The opposition SPD also suffered major losses, while the AfD entered the Landtag with 13%, the FDP and The Left recorded modest gains.

Though preliminary results indicated that the incumbent government would retain its majority, it was not certain due to the narrow margins and issues with the vote count. Whether the Greens or SPD would claim second place was also unclear. Final results were determined weeks later after recounts. Nonetheless, the CDU quickly stated that they would seek to lead a two-party government with either the Greens or SPD, and held exploratory talks with both. The FDP were also invited to talks, but lead candidate René Rock ruled out joining a coalition with the CDU and Greens since his party would not be mathematically necessary for a majority.

Also discussed was the possibility of a traffic light coalition between the Greens, SPD, and FDP, which would also hold a one-seat majority. Initially, the FDP rejected this on the basis that Tarek Al-Wazir had expressed a lack of interest in becoming Minister-President. However, as reviews of the vote count indicated that the SPD may have won more votes than the Greens and would be able to lay claim to the Minister-Presidency, the FDP agreed to meet with them on 9 November. The day before final results were released on 16 November, the three parties held joint discussions, after which SPD lead candidate Thorsten Schäfer-Gümbel voiced his confidence in their ability to come at an agreement. However, after final results showed that the Greens had indeed moved ahead of the SPD, a traffic light coalition was no longer considered possible as the FDP would not support a Green Minister-President. Schäfer-Gümbel subsequently declared the SPD would remain in opposition, leaving a renewed government between the CDU and Greens as the only practical option.

The same day, the CDU voted to extend an offer for coalition negotiations to the Greens, which they accepted. Discussions began on 19 November with the goal of finalising an agreement before Christmas. Negotiations were finalised on the morning of 19 December. The coalition contract, titled New Start in Change through Attitude, Orientation and Cohesion, was approved by 91% of Greens delegates and unanimously by the CDU committee, and was signed on 23 December.

Bouffier was elected as Minister-President by the Landtag on 18 January 2019, winning 69 votes out of 137 cast.

== Composition ==
Portfolio	Minister	Party	Took office	Left office	State secretaries
Minister-President	Volker Bouffier born 18 December 1951 (age 74)	CDU	18 January 2019	30 May 2022	Michael Bußer
Deputy Minister-President Minister for Economics, Energy, Transport and Housing	Tarek Al-Wazir born 3 January 1971 (age 55)	GRÜNE	18 January 2019	30 May 2022	Philipp Nimmermann; Jens Deutschendorf
Minister for Interior and Sport	Peter Beuth born 3 December 1967 (age 58)	CDU	18 January 2019	30 May 2022	Stefan Sauer
Minister for Finance	Thomas Schäfer; 22 February 1966 – 28 March 2020 (aged 54)	CDU	18 January 2019	28 March 2020	Martin Worms
Minister for Finance	Michael Boddenberg born 15 July 1959 (age 66)	CDU	31 March 2020	30 May 2022	Martin Worms
Minister for Justice	Eva Kühne-Hörmann born 14 March 1962 (age 63)	CDU	18 January 2019	30 May 2022	Thomas Metz
Minister for Education	Ralph Alexander Lorz born 30 November 1965 (age 60)	CDU	18 January 2019	30 May 2022	Manuel Lösel
Minister for Science and Art	Angela Dorn-Rancke born 2 June 1982 (age 43)	GRÜNE	18 January 2019	30 May 2022	Ayse Asar
Minister for Social Affairs and Integration	Kai Klose born 23 December 1973 (age 52)	GRÜNE	18 January 2019	30 May 2022	Anne Janz
Minister for Environment, Climate Protection, Agricultural Economics and Consumer Protection	Priska Hinz born 10 March 1959 (age 66)	GRÜNE	18 January 2019	30 May 2022	Oliver Conz
Minister for Federal Affairs and Europe	Lucia Puttrich born 11 April 1961 (age 64)	CDU	18 January 2019	30 May 2022	Uwe Becker
Minister for Digital Strategy and Development	Kristina Sinemus born 16 September 1963 (age 62)	CDU	18 January 2019	30 May 2022	Patrick Burghardt
Head of the State Chancellery	Axel Wintermeyer born 1 January 1960 (age 66)	CDU	18 January 2019	30 May 2022	
