= Lucia Puttrich =

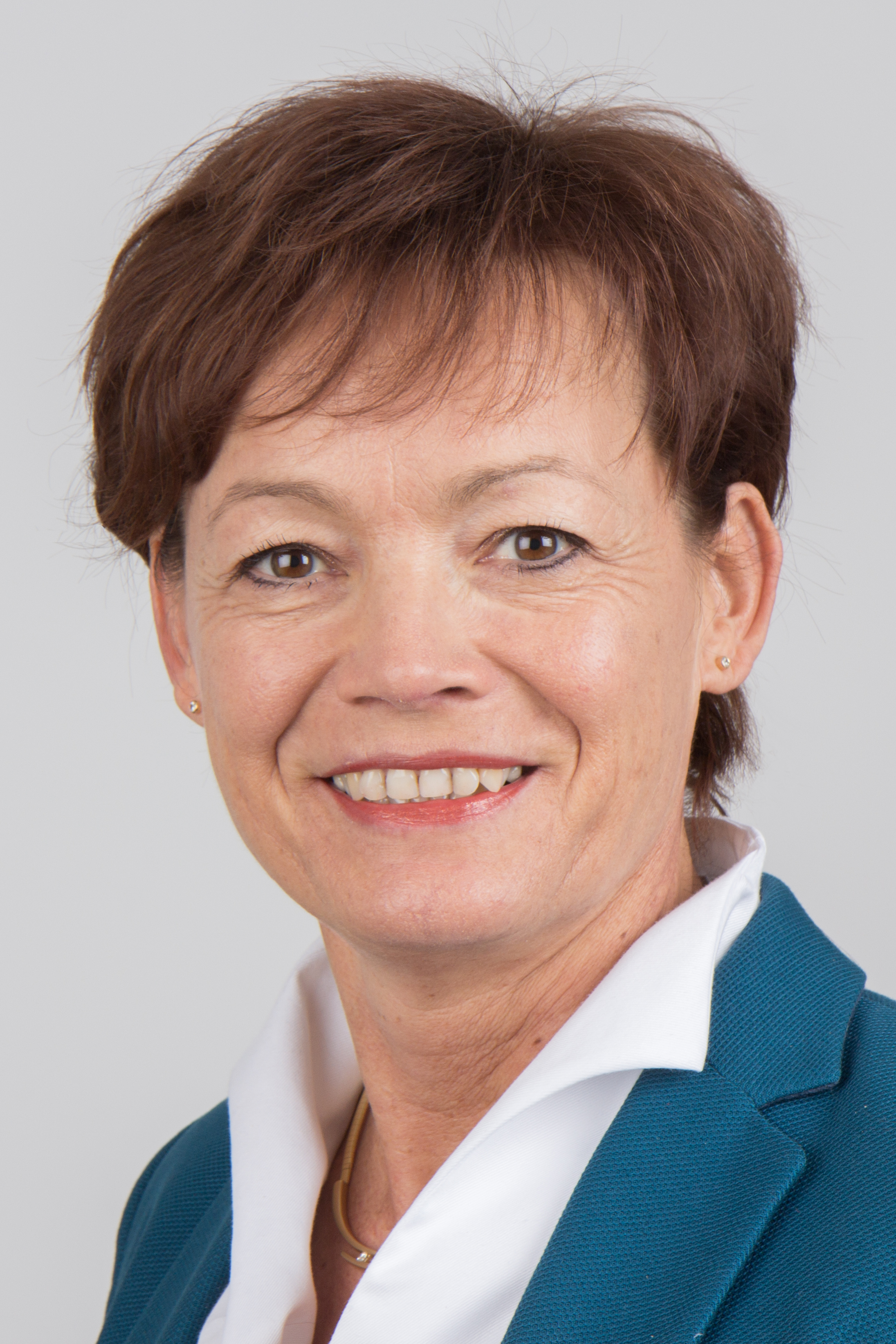
- Lucia Puttrich in 2016

Minister for Federal Affairs and Europe of Hesse
- In office 18 January 2014 – 18 January 2024
- Minister-President: Volker Bouffier; Boris Rhein
- Preceded by: Michael Boddenberg (Federal Affairs); Jörg-Uwe Hahn (Europe)
- Succeeded by: Manfred Pentz

Minister for the Environment, Energy, Agriculture and Consumer Protection of Hesse
- In office 31 August 2010 – 18 January 2014
- Minister-President: Volker Bouffier
- Preceded by: Silke Lautenschläger
- Succeeded by: Priska Hinz

Member of the Landtag of Hesse
- In office 18 January 2014 – 18 January 2024
- Preceded by: Multi-member district
- Succeeded by: Patrick Appel
- Constituency: State list (2014–2019); Wetterau II (2019–2024)

Member of the Bundestag; for Wetterau
- In office 27 October 2009 – 3 September 2010
- Preceded by: Nina Hauer
- Succeeded by: Bernd Siebert

Personal details
- Born: 11 April 1961 (age 65) Giessen, West Germany
- Party: Christian Democratic Union
- Children: 2
- Parent: Arnold Spruck (father)
- Education: University of Würzburg; TH Mittelhessen

Lucia Puttrich (born 11 April 1961) is a German politician from the Christian Democratic Union of Germany (CDU). From 2014 to 2024, she served as the Hessian Minister for Federal and European Affairs and as the State of Hesse's Representative to the Federal Government. Prior to that, from 2010 to 2014, she was the Hessian Minister for the Environment, Energy, Agriculture, and Consumer Protection. From 1995 to 2009, Puttrich was Mayor of the town of Nidda, and from September 2009 to September 2010, she was a member of the German Bundestag. From 2014 to 2024, she was also a member of the Landtag of Hesse.

== Early life and education ==
After graduating from the Nidda Gymnasium (high school), Puttrich initially studied law at the Julius-Maximilians-University of Würzburg before beginning her studies in business administration at the University of Applied Sciences Mittelhessen in Gießen. After graduating in 1986 with a degree in business administration, she worked in her parents' craft business before moving into management at a medium-sized paper processing company in 1988.

== Political career ==
Puttrich joined the CDU in 1977. In 1985, she was elected to the Nidda city council, where she served for ten years. During this time, she was also active on the local advisory board for several years. On 22 January 1995, she was elected mayor of Nidda in a direct election, succeeding Helmut Jung (SPD). She successfully defended her office in two subsequent direct elections.

Puttrich has been a member of the Federal Executive Committee of the CDU's Association of Local Politicians since 1999 and deputy state chairwoman in Hesse. In 2006, she was elected district chairwoman of the CDU Wetterau and a member of the district council. She has been a member of the CDU Hesse Presidium since 2002 and became its deputy state chairwoman in 2010. She also served on the CDU Federal Executive Committee until 2024.

Lucia Puttrich served as President and Vice President of the Hessian Association of Towns and Municipalities from 2001 to 2009, alternating between the two positions.

=== Member of the Bundestag (2009–2010) ===
On 21 November 2008, she was nominated as the CDU candidate for the Wetterau constituency in the Bundestag elections. On 27 September 2009, she was elected to the 17th German Bundestag with 41.0% of the vote for the Wetterau constituency.

In the German Bundestag, Lucia Puttrich was a full member of the Committee on Economic Affairs and Technology and the Committee on Food, Agriculture and Consumer Protection. She was also a substitute member of the Committee on Legal Affairs. After taking office as Hessian Minister for the Environment, she resigned her seat as a directly elected member of parliament on 3 September 2010.

=== Hesse political career ===
From 2010 to 2014 she was Hessian Minister for the Environment in the First Bouffier cabinet.

In the 2013 Hessian state election, she won a seat via a party list position. In the Second Bouffier cabinet, she was appointed Hessian State Representative to the Federal Government as State Minister for Federal and European Affairs on 18 January 2014.

In the 2018 Hessian state election, she won the direct mandate in constituency 26 (Wetterau II constituency) with 29.4 percent of the votes cast. In the Third Bouffier cabinet, she was reappointed Minister of State for Federal and European Affairs on 18 January 2019. She held this office again in the First Rhein cabinet from 31 May 2022. With the formation of the Second Rhein cabinet, she left her ministerial post on 18 January 2024.

She did not run again in the 2023 Hessian state election. She thus left the Hessian State Parliament at the inaugural session of the 21st Hessian State Parliament on 18 January 2024. Her successor as constituency representative was Patrick Appel (CDU).

In 2024 she received the Hessian Order of Merit.

== Political positions ==
Lucia Puttrich supports the Transatlantic Trade and Investment Partnership and publicly opposes its critics.

== Personal life ==
Puttrich is Roman Catholic, married, and the mother of two adult daughters.

She is the daughter of CDU politician Arnold Spruck.
