= First Rhein cabinet =

State government of Hesse

First Cabinet of Boris Rhein Rhein I
- 23rd Cabinet of Hesse
- 31 May 2022 – 18 January 2024
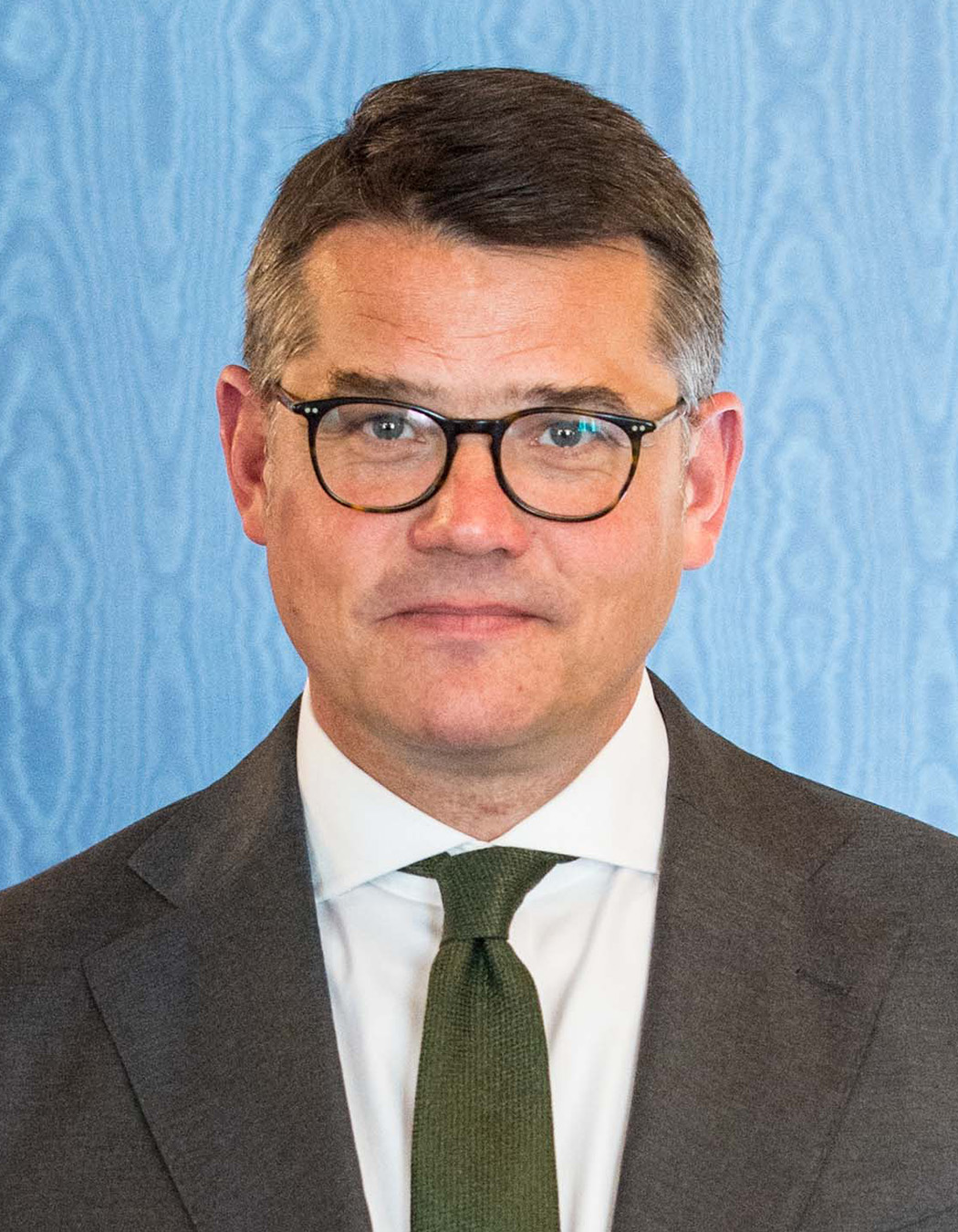
- Boris Rhein in May 2019
- Date formed: 31 May 2022
- Date dissolved: 18 January 2024

People and organisations
- Minister-President: Boris Rhein
- Deputy Minister-President: Tarek Al-Wazir
- No. of ministers: 11
- Member parties: Christian Democratic Union; Alliance 90/The Greens
- Status in legislature: Coalition government (Majority); 69 / 137 (50%)
- Opposition parties: Social Democratic Party; Alternative for Germany; Free Democratic Party; The Left

History
- Election: None
- Legislature term: 20th Landtag of Hesse
- Predecessor: Third Bouffier cabinet
- Successor: Second Rhein cabinet

The first Rhein cabinet was the state government of Hesse from 31 May 2022, after Boris Rhein was elected as Minister-President of Hesse by the members of the Landtag of Hesse, until 18 January 2024. It was the 23rd Cabinet of Hesse, and was succeeded by the second Rhein cabinet.

It was formed after the resignation of Minister-President Volker Bouffier, and was a continuation of the coalition government of the Christian Democratic Union (CDU) and Alliance 90/The Greens (GRÜNE) formed after the 2018 Hessian state election. Excluding the Minister-President, the cabinet comprised eleven ministers. Seven were members of the CDU and four were members of the Greens.

== Formation ==
The previous cabinet was a coalition government of the CDU and the Greens led by Minister-President Volker Bouffier of the CDU. In February 2022, Bouffier announced his resignation and intention to leave office at the end of May. He nominated Boris Rhein, President of the Landtag and former minister in Bouffier's second cabinet, as his successor. Shortly after, Rhein was unanimously confirmed by a CDU party conference.

Rhein was elected as Minister-President by the Landtag on 31 May 2022, winning 74 votes out of 137 cast.

== Composition ==
Portfolio	Minister	Party	Took office	Left office	State secretaries
Minister-President	Boris Rhein born 2 January 1972 (age 54)	CDU	31 May 2022	18 January 2024	Tobias Rösmann
Deputy Minister-President Minister for Economics, Energy, Transport and Housing	Tarek Al-Wazir born 3 January 1971 (age 55)	GRÜNE	31 May 2022	18 January 2024	Philipp Nimmermann (Until 26 May 2023); Jens Deutschendorf
Head of the State Chancellery	Axel Wintermeyer born 1 January 1960 (age 66)	CDU	31 May 2022	18 January 2024	
Minister for Federal Affairs and Europe	Lucia Puttrich born 11 April 1961 (age 65)	CDU	31 May 2022	18 January 2024	Uwe Becker
Minister for Interior and Sport	Peter Beuth born 3 December 1967 (age 58)	CDU	31 May 2022	18 January 2024	Stefan Sauer
Minister for Finance	Michael Boddenberg born 15 July 1959 (age 66)	CDU	31 May 2022	18 January 2024	Martin Worms
Minister for Justice	Roman Poseck born 16 March 1970 (age 56)	CDU	31 May 2022	18 January 2024	Tanja Eichner
Minister for Education	Ralph Alexander Lorz born 30 November 1965 (age 60)	CDU	31 May 2022	18 January 2024	Manuel Lösel
Minister for Science and Art	Angela Dorn-Rancke born 2 June 1982 (age 43)	GRÜNE	31 May 2022	18 January 2024	Ayse Asar
Minister for Social Affairs and Integration	Kai Klose born 23 December 1973 (age 52)	GRÜNE	31 May 2022	18 January 2024	Anne Janz
Minister for Environment, Climate Protection, Agricultural Economics and Consumer Protection	Priska Hinz born 10 March 1959 (age 67)	GRÜNE	31 May 2022	18 January 2024	Oliver Conz
Minister for Digital Strategy and Development	Kristina Sinemus born 16 September 1963 (age 62)	CDU	31 May 2022	18 January 2024	Patrick Burghardt (Until 31 December 2023)
