= Second Bouffier cabinet =

Second Cabinet of Volker Bouffier Bouffier II
- 21st Cabinet of Hesse
- 18 January 2014 – 17 January 2019
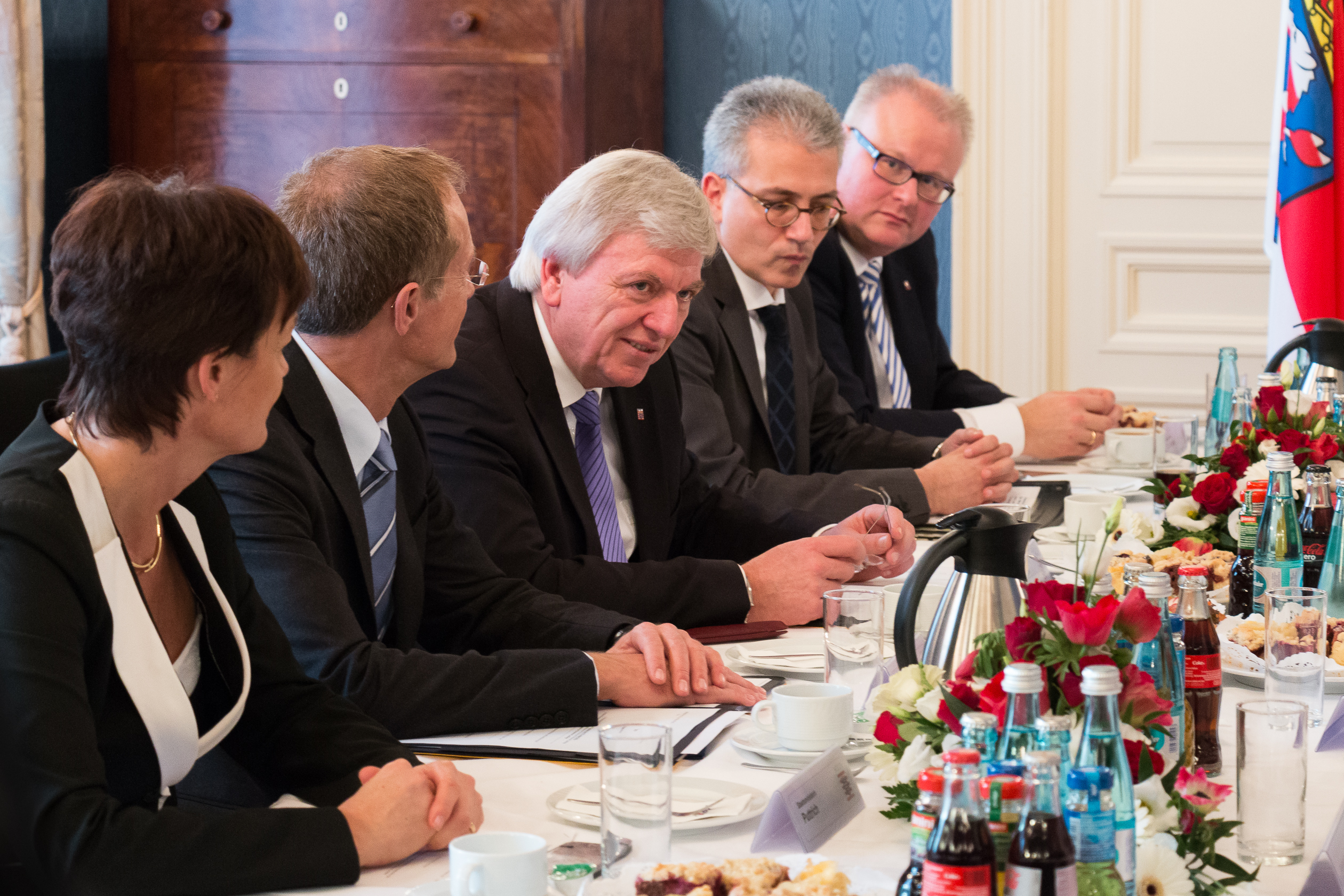
- The inaugural meeting of the second Bouffier cabinet on 18 January 2014. From left to right: Lucia Puttrich, Axel Wintermeyer, Volker Bouffier, Tarek Al-Wazir, and Thomas Schäfer
- Date formed: 18 January 2014
- Date dissolved: 17 January 2019

People and organisations
- Minister-President: Volker Bouffier
- Deputy Minister-President: Tarek Al-Wazir
- No. of ministers: 10
- Member parties: Christian Democratic Union; Alliance 90/The Greens
- Status in legislature: Coalition government (Majority); 61 / 110 (55%)
- Opposition parties: Social Democratic Party; The Left; Free Democratic Party

History
- Election: 2013 Hessian state election
- Legislature term: 19th Landtag of Hesse
- Predecessor: First Bouffier cabinet
- Successor: Third Bouffier cabinet

The Second Bouffier cabinet was the state government of Hesse between 2014 and 2019, sworn in on 18 January 2014 after Volker Bouffier was elected as Minister-President of Hesse by the members of the Landtag of Hesse. It was the 21st Cabinet of Hesse.

It was formed after the 2013 Hessian state election by the Christian Democratic Union (CDU) and Alliance 90/The Greens (GRÜNE). Excluding the Minister-President, the cabinet comprised ten ministers. Eight were members of the CDU and two were members of the Greens.

The second Bouffier cabinet was succeeded by the third Bouffier cabinet on 18 January 2019.

== Formation ==
The previous cabinet was a coalition government of the CDU and Free Democratic Party (FDP) led by Minister-President Volker Bouffier of the CDU.

The election took place on 22 September 2013, and resulted in major losses for the FDP and a slight improvement for the CDU. The opposition SPD achieved significant gains, while the Greens declined and The Left remained steady.

Overall, the incumbent coalition lost its majority. The opposition coalition of the SPD and Greens also fell short of a majority, leaving no clear path to government for either major party. Options included a grand coalition of the CDU and SPD, an SPD–Green–Left coalition, and a CDU–Green coalition. A traffic light coalition of the SPD, Greens, and FDP also held a majority, but was ruled out by the FDP. The SPD and Greens both announced plans to hold exploratory talks with all other parties and stated they were open to all options. The Left stated they would be willing to provide external support to a minority government of the SPD and Greens.

The first round of talks between the CDU and SPD were inconclusive. After meeting on 8 October, the CDU and Greens spoke positively and scheduled a second round for the following week. On the 15th, Bouffier and Green leader Tarek Al-Wazir stated that, despite differences, a coalition between their parties could be possible. They organised a third meeting for two weeks later. Meanwhile, opinion polling indicated that two-thirds of voters preferred a coalition between the CDU and SPD.

At the same time, the SPD and Greens held joint talks with The Left. Though they found common ground on education, energy, and labour, they encountered difficulties over finance policy and proposed expansions to Frankfurt Airport. They were also troubled by public spats between party leaders, with Janine Wissler accusing the SPD of sabotaging a potential coalition after the 2008 Hessian state election and federal SPD chairman Sigmar Gabriel describing The Left as "crazies". The Greens and later SPD rejected The Left's proposal for a minority government, leaving a formal coalition as the only option.

By mid-November, the CDU and Greens continued to give optimistic signs, while talks had stalled between the three left-wing parties; SPD leader Thorsten Schäfer-Gümbel was rumoured to have declared negotiations with The Left a failure. Exploratory discussions also continued between the SPD and CDU, finding common ground in areas like finance policy, although both parties described a grand coalition as a last resort. Talks concluded indecisively on the 18th.

On 22 November, Volker Bouffier announced that the CDU intended to offer coalition negotiations to the Greens. The next day, the Greens congress voted to accept. The CDU and Greens presented their coalition contract on 18 December. It was approved by both parties' congresses on the 21st, with the Greens voting 74% in support and the CDU near-unanimously, and officially signed on 23 December.

Bouffier was elected Minister-President by the Landtag on 18 January 2014, though the initial ballot was invalidated because of an administrative error: the generic placeholder name Max Mustermann was printed on some of the ballots instead of Volker Bouffier's name, causing the vote to be re-taken. In the re-vote, Bouffier was elected with 62 votes out of 109 cast.

== Composition ==
The composition of the cabinet at the time of its dissolution was as follows:

Portfolio	Minister	Party	Took office	Left office	State secretaries
Minister-President	Volker Bouffier born 18 December 1951	CDU	18 January 2014	17 January 2019	
Deputy Minister-President Minister for Economics, Energy, Transport and State Development	Tarek Al-Wazir born 3 January 1971	GRÜNE	18 January 2014	17 January 2019	Mathias Samson
Minister for Interior and Sport	Peter Beuth born 3 December 1967	CDU	18 January 2014	17 January 2019	Werner Koch
Minister for Finance	Thomas Schäfer born 22 February 1966	CDU	18 January 2014	17 January 2019	Martin Worms
Minister for Justice	Eva Kühne-Hörmann born 14 March 1962	CDU	18 January 2014	17 January 2019	Thomas Metz
Minister for Social Affairs and Integration	Stefan Grüttner born 25 December 1956	CDU	18 January 2014	17 January 2019	Wolfgang Dippel; Kai Klose (Integration and Anti-Discrimination)
Minister for Education	Ralph Alexander Lorz born 30 November 1965	CDU	18 January 2014	17 January 2019	Manuel Lösel
Minister for Science and Art	Boris Rhein born 2 January 1972	CDU	18 January 2014	17 January 2019	Patrick Burghardt
Minister for Environment, Climate Protection, Agricultural Economics and Consumer Protection	Priska Hinz born 10 March 1959	GRÜNE	18 January 2014	17 January 2019	Beatrix Tappeser
Head of the State Chancellery	Axel Wintermeyer born 1 January 1960	CDU	18 January 2014	17 January 2019	Michael Bußer; Mark Weinmeister
Minister for Federal Affairs and Europe	Lucia Puttrich born 11 April 1961	CDU	18 January 2014	17 January 2019	Mark Weinmeister
