= Rhein cabinet =

Rhein cabinet is the name of any of two cabinets in the German state Hesse led by Boris Rhein:

- First Rhein cabinet (2022–2024)
- Second Rhein cabinet (2024–current)
