= Second Rhein cabinet =

State government of Hesse

Second Cabinet of Boris Rhein Rhein II
- 24th Cabinet of Hesse
- 18 January 2024 –
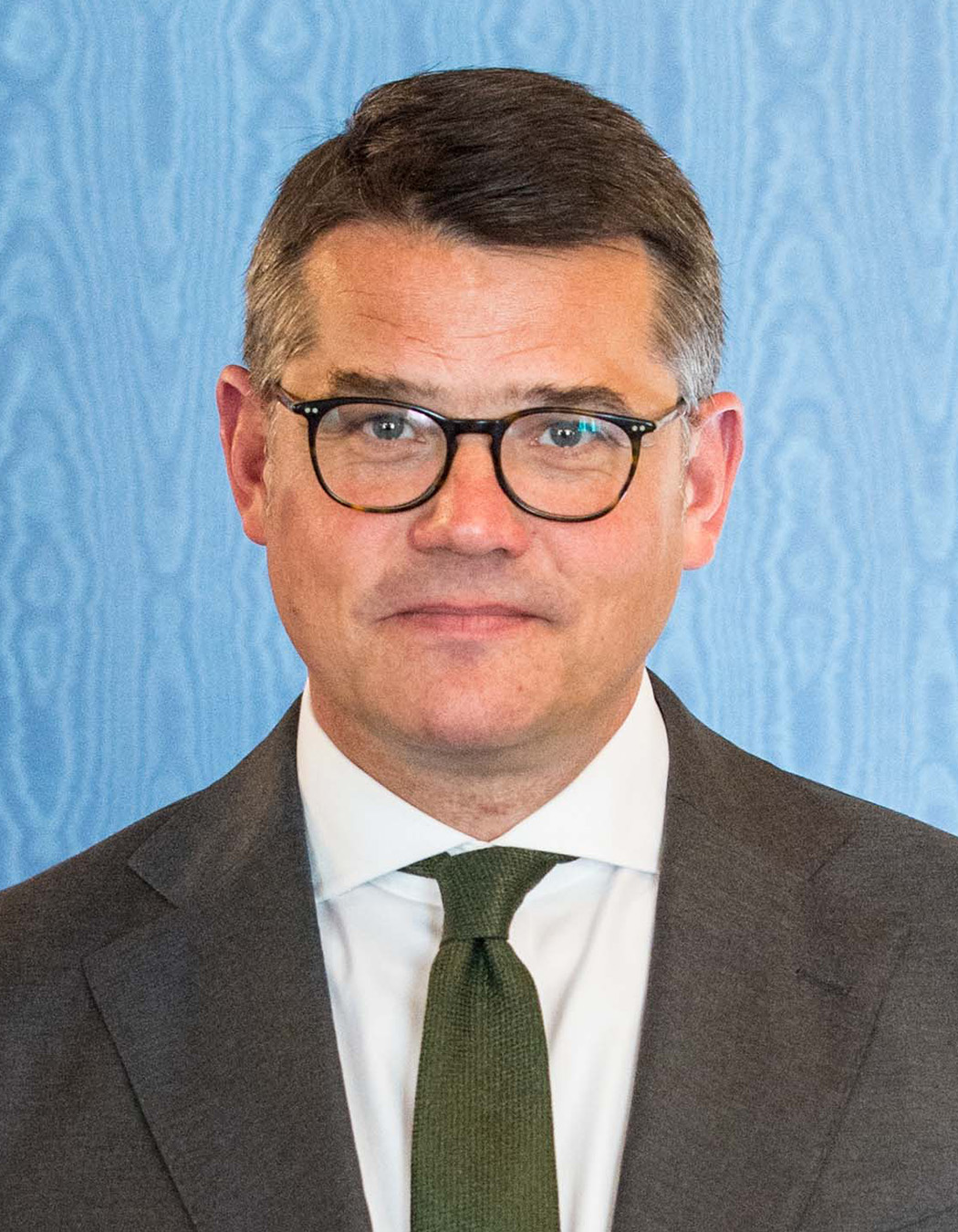
- Boris Rhein in May 2019
- Date formed: 18 January 2024

People and organisations
- Minister-President: Boris Rhein
- No. of ministers: 11
- Member parties: Christian Democratic Union; Social Democratic Party
- Status in legislature: Coalition government (Majority); 75 / 133 (56%)
- Opposition parties: Alternative for Germany; Alliance 90/The Greens; Free Democratic Party

History
- Election: 2023 Hessian state election
- Legislature term: 21st Landtag of Hesse
- Predecessor: First Rhein cabinet

The second Rhein cabinet is the current state government of Hesse. It was formed on 18 January 2024 and is the 24th Cabinet of Hesse.

== Composition ==
Portfolio	Minister	Party	Took office	Left office	State secretaries
Minister-President	Boris Rhein born 2 January 1972 (age 54)	CDU	18 January 2024	Incumbent	Benedikt Kuhn [as Head of the State Chancellery]; Tobias Rösmann [as State Government Spokesperson]
Deputy Minister-President Minister for Economics, Energy, Transport, Housing and Rural Area	Kaweh Mansoori born 12 August 1988 (age 38)	SPD	18 January 2024	Incumbent	Umut Sönmez (Until April 13, 2026); Lamia Messari-Becker (February 6, 2024 to July 22, 2024); Ines Fröhlich (Since November 20, 2024)
Minister for Federal, European and International Affairs and Deregulation	Manfred Pentz born 10 March 1980 (age 46)	CDU	18 January 2024	Incumbent	Karin Müller
Minister for Finance	Ralph Alexander Lorz born 30 November 1965 (age 60)	CDU	18 January 2024	Incumbent	Uwe Becker (Until June 30, 2025); Till Kaesbach (Since July 15, 2025)
Minister for Interior and Internal Security	Roman Poseck born 16 March 1970 (age 56)	CDU	18 January 2024	Incumbent	Martin Rößler
Minister for Justice and the Rule of Law	Christian Heinz born 6 June 1976 (age 50)	CDU	18 January 2024	Incumbent	Tanja Eichner
Minister for Religious Affairs, Education and Opportunities	Armin Schwarz born 3 June 1968 (age 58)	CDU	18 January 2024	Incumbent	Manuel Lösel
Minister for Family, Seniors, Sport, Health and Care	Diana Stolz born 13 April 1976 (age 50)	CDU	18 January 2024	Incumbent	Sonja Optendrenk
Minister for Digitalization and Innovation	Kristina Sinemus born 16 September 1963 (age 62)	CDU	18 January 2024	Incumbent	Stefan Sauer
Minister for Agriculture, Environment, Viticulture, Forestry, Hunting and Local Heritage	Ingmar Jung born 4 April 1978 (age 48)	CDU	18 January 2024	Incumbent	Michael Ruhl; Daniel Köfer
Minister for Labour, Integration, Youth and Social Affairs	Heike Hofmann born 30 June 1973 (age 53)	SPD	18 January 2024	Incumbent	Manuela Strube; Katrin Hechler
Minister for Science, Research, Art and Culture	Timon Gremmels born 4 January 1976 (age 50)	SPD	18 January 2024	Incumbent	Christoph Degen
