= Ayse Asar =

German jurist and politician

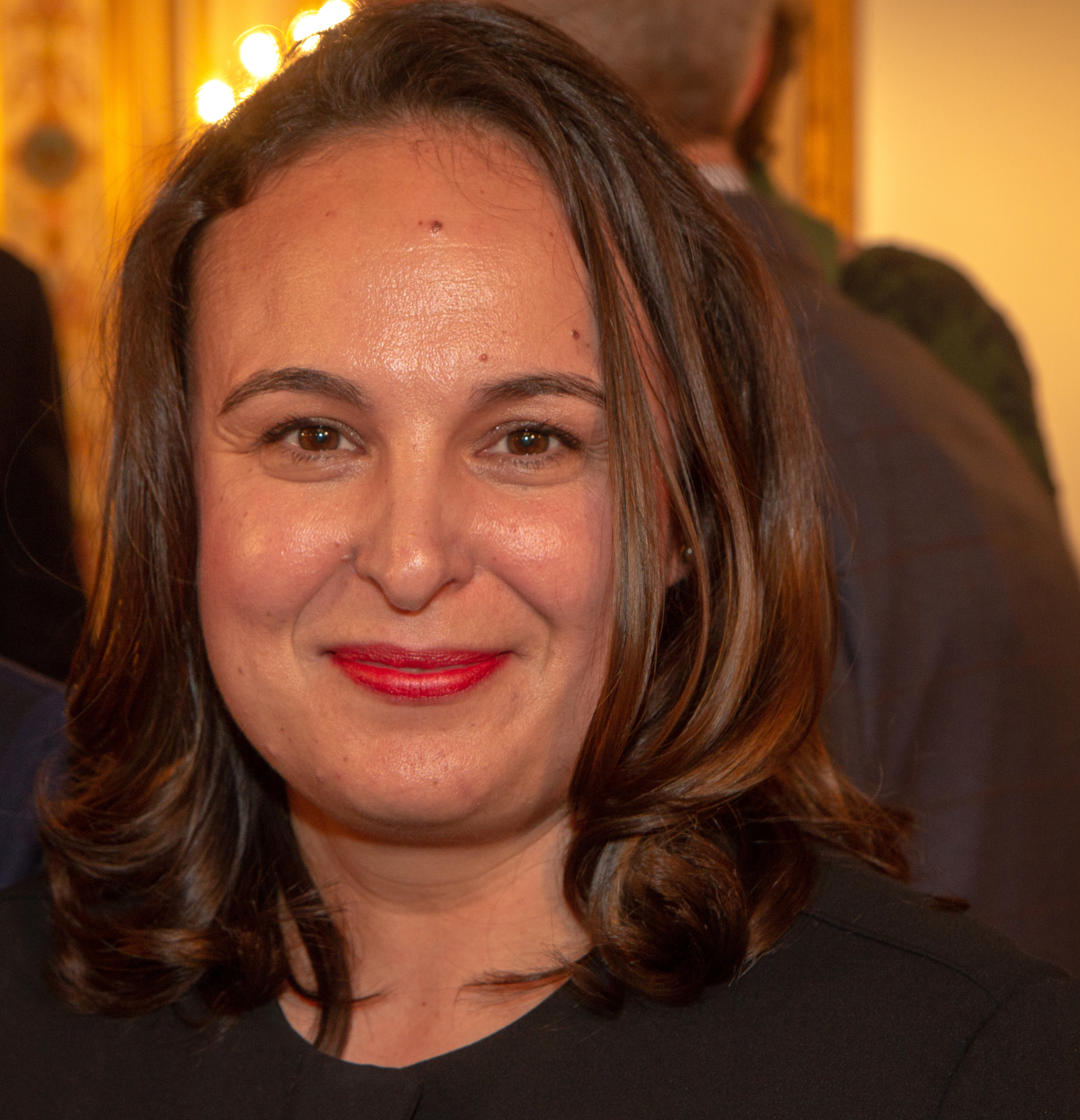
- Asar in 2019

Secretary of state of the Hessian Ministry of Higher Education, Research and the Arts
- Incumbent
- Assumed office 18 January 2019
- Preceded by: 2025

Personal details
- Born: 19 December 1975 (age 50) Bad Schwalbach, West Germany (now Germany)
- Party: Greens
- Children: 2
- Education: University of Gießen; University of Cologne; London Metropolitan University
- Occupation: Jurist; University chancellor

Ayse Asar (born 19 December 1975) is a German lawyer and politician of Bündnis 90/Die Grünen who has been serving as a member of the German Bundestag since the 2025 elections.

Earlier in her career, Asar was deputy chancellor of the Goethe University in Frankfurt, and from 2015 chancellor of the Hochschule RheinMain. From 2019 to 2025, she served as secretary of state for the Hessian Ministry of Higher Education, Research and the Arts.

== Early life and education ==
Asar was born to Turkish parents in Bad Schwalbach on 19 December 1975. Her parents were workers for Black+Decker in Idstein, where she grew up with three sisters and a brother. She studied law from 1994 at the Justus-Liebig-Universität Gießen, continuing in 1996 at the University of Cologne, where she achieved the first state exam in 1999.

== Early career ==
After referendary work at the Oberlandesgericht Düsseldorf, and work in Istanbul and Ankara, she passed the second state exam in 2002. She achieved a Master of Laws degree in 2003 at the London Metropolitan University.

Asar worked from 2004 and 2015 in several funktions at the Goethe University, finally as deputy chancellor, head of the Justitiariat and commissionary head of personnel. She became chancellor of the Hochschule RheinMain in 2015.

== Political career ==
=== Career in state politics ===
On 18 January 2019, Asar was appointed secretary of state (Staatssekretärin) by Angela Dorn, minister of science and art, serving in the Third Bouffier cabinet and in the Rhein cabinet.

=== Member of the German Parliament, 2025–present ===
In parliament, Asar has been a member of the Committee on European Affairs and the Committee on Research, Technology, Space and Technology Assessment. She is her parliamentary group’s spokesperson on research policy.

In addition to his committee assignments, Asar has been serving as deputy chair of the German-Turkish Parliamentary Friendship Group.

== Other activities ==
- Darmstadt University of Applied Sciences, Member of the Board of Trustees (since 2025)

== Recognition ==
In 2018, Asar was awarded the recognition "Herausragender Mensch mit Migrationshintergrund" (Excellent person with migration background).

== Personal life ==
Asar is married; the couple has two children. She is a Muslim.
