= Priska Hinz =

German politician

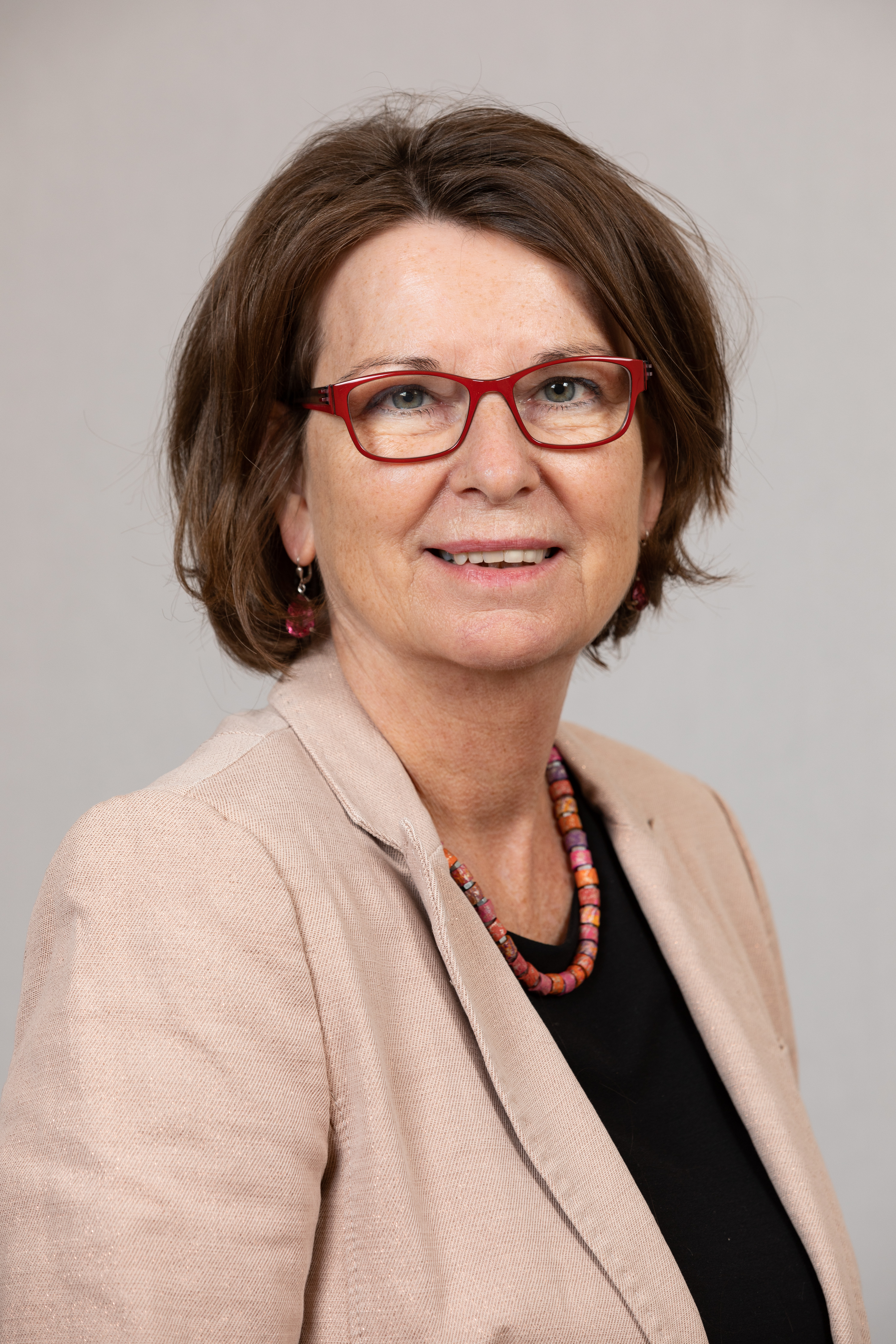
Hinz in 2019

Priska Hinz is a German politician of the Alliance 90/The Greens. After a career as an educator, she worked in both regional (state) and national politics. She was member of the Bundestag from 2005 to 2014, by winning a seat in the 16th, 17th and 18th Federal election. Hinze then worked as the Environment Minister of Hesse for a decade.

== Life ==
Hinz was born on 10 March 1959 in Diez, Rhineland-Palatinate. After graduating from secondary school (Realschule) in 1974 in Herborn, she went to a college for social pedagogy in Limburg an der Lahn, from where she graduated as an educator in 1977. She then worked for the Evangelische Gemeinschaft (Evangelical Community Association) in Herborn from 1977 to 1979 and then worked in children day care centers.

From 1979 to 1982, Hinz worked as an educator and later as manager for the Kindertagesstätte Heilig Geist (Holy Spirit Day Care Centre) in Frankfurt. For a brief year, she also educated at another center in Friedrichsdorf in 1982.

She joined the Green Party in 1980 and was a member of the party's executive board in Hesse from 1993 to 1995.

In the late 1980s and early 1990s, Hinz had seats in the city Parliaments of Friedrichsdorf and Maintal, as well as the regional district government of the Lahn-Dill district. In Maintal, she was the city treasurer from 1989 to 1994 and head of social affairs.

For multiple times (from 1985 to 1989, 1995 to 1998, April 1999 to 2005 and since 2014), she was a member of the Hessian state parliament. During that time she was deputy parliamentary group leader from 1985 to 1987, 1995 to 1998 and 2003 to 2005 and first parliamentary group leader from 1999 to 2000.

From 1994 to 1995, she was member of the Bundesrat, a representative of the state of Hesse to the federal government.

She was a member of the Bundestag from 2005 to 2014, by winning a seat in the 16th, 17th and 18th Federal elections. Her seat in the Bundestag was replaced by Wolfgang Strengmann-Kuhn in 2014, as she didn't complete her third "term" because - after the 2013 Hessian State Election - the Second Bouffier Cabinet was formed, in which Volker Bouffier appointed her the Environment Minister of Hesse. She stayed in this position until 2024, as part of the Third Bouffier Cabinet, and the First Rhein Cabinet. As announced in 2022, she did not seek re-election, stating that "after four decades in politics, [she] wants to look after [her] grandchildren, family and [her]self in future."

== Personal life ==
Hinz is married and has two sons.
