= Patrick Appel =

German politician (born 1989)

Member of the Landtag of Hesse
- Incumbent
- Assumed office 18 January 2024
- Preceded by: Lucia Puttrich
- Constituency: Wetterau II

Personal details
- Born: 19 May 1989 (age 37)
- Party: Christian Democratic Union (since 2005)

Patrick Appel (born 19 May 1989) is a German politician serving as a member of the Landtag of Hesse since 2024. He has served as mayor of Wolferborn since 2021.
