= Angela Dorn-Rancke =

German politician (born 1982)

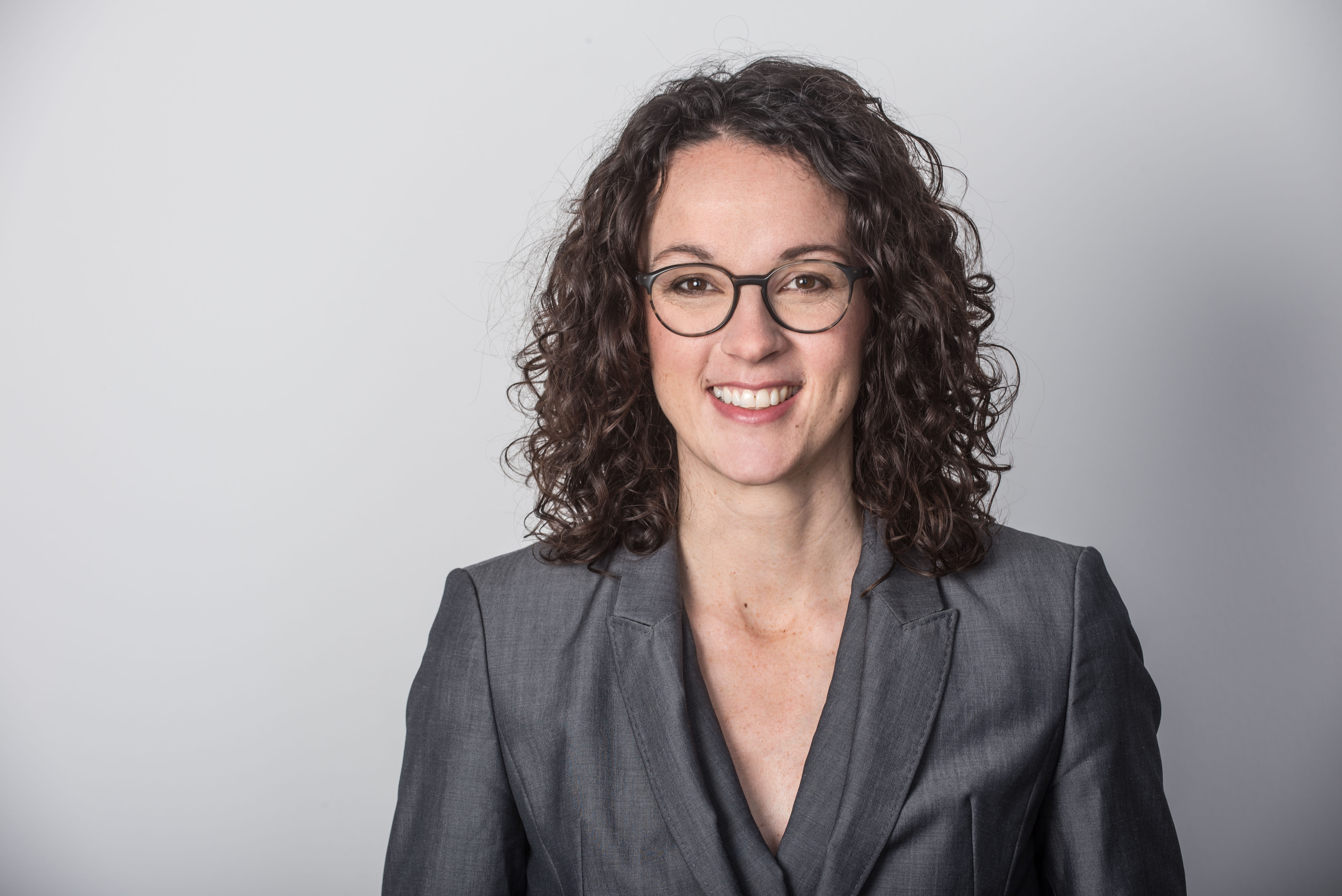
- Angela Dorn-Rancke in 2019

Hessian Minister of State for Higher Education, Research, Science and the Arts
- In office 18 January 2019 – 2024
- Preceded by: Boris Rhein

Member of the Landtag of Hesse
- Incumbent
- Assumed office 2009

Personal details
- Born: 2 June 1982 (age 44) Aschaffenburg, West Germany (now Germany)
- Party: Greens
- Children: 3
- Education: University of Marburg

Angela Dorn-Rancke (born 2 June 1982) is a German politician of Alliance 90/The Greens who served as the State Minister for Higher Education, Research, Science and the Arts of Hesse in the cabinet of Minister-President Volker Bouffier from 2019 to 2024.

== Political career ==
In the 2009 elections, Dorn-Rancke was elected into the State Parliament of Hesse, at the time as the youngest member of legislative.

From 2017 to 2019, Dorn-Rancke served as co-chair of her party of the Green Party in Hesse, alongside Kai Klose.

In the negotiations to form a so-called traffic light coalition of the Social Democratic Party (SPD), the Green Party and the Free Democrats (FDP) following the 2021 German elections, Dorn-Rancke was part of her party's delegation in the working group on innovation and research, co-chaired by Thomas Losse-Müller, Katharina Fegebank and Lydia Hüskens.

== Other activities ==
- Cultural Foundation of the German States (KdL), Member of the Council (2019–2024)
- Fritz Bauer Institute, Member of the Board
- Hessische Kulturstiftung, Ex-Officio Member of the Board of Trustees (2019–2024)
- Peace Research Institute Frankfurt (HSFK), chair of the Board of Trustees (2019–2024)
- University Hospital Frankfurt, Goethe University Frankfurt, Ex-Officio Member of the Board of Trustees (2019–2024)
- Vietnamese-German University (VGU), Member of the University Council (2019–2024)
- Von-Behring Röntgen Foundation, Ex-Officio Member of the Board of Trustees (2019–2024)
- German Federation for the Environment and Nature Conservation (BUND)
- Medico International, Member
- Hessischer Rundfunk, Member of the Broadcasting Council (–2019)
