= Christian Heinz =

German politician (born 1976)

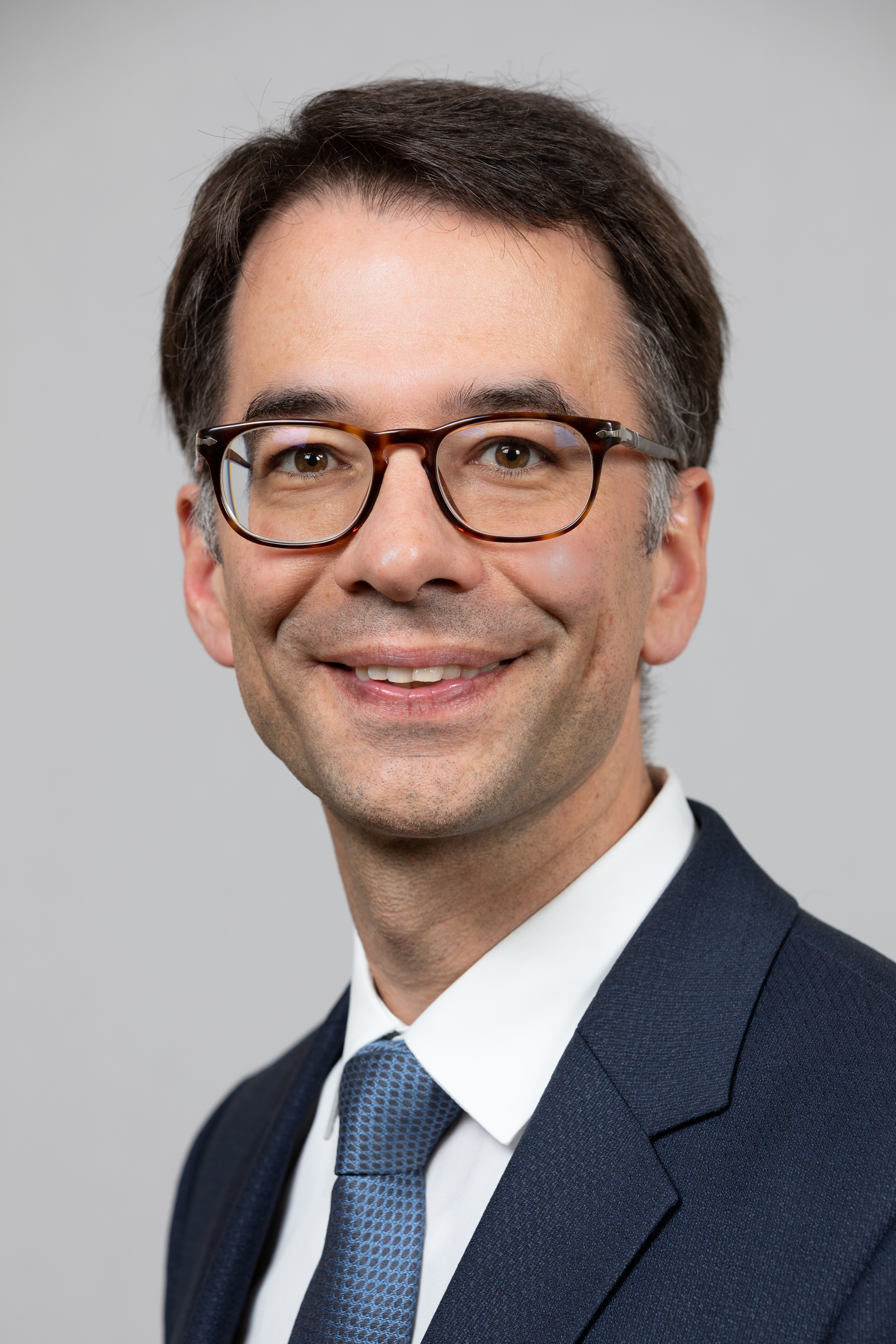
- Heinz in 2019

Minister of Justice and the Rule of Law of Hesse
- Incumbent
- Assumed office 18 January 2024
- Minister-President: Boris Rhein
- Preceded by: Roman Poseck

Personal details
- Born: 6 June 1976 (age 49) Frankfurt am Main
- Party: Christian Democratic Union (since 1992)

Christian Heinz (born 6 June 1976 in Frankfurt am Main) is a German politician serving as minister of justice and the rule of law of Hesse since 2024. He has been a member of the Landtag of Hesse since 2010.
