= Bouffier =

Bouffier is a surname. Notable people with the surname include:

- Bryan Bouffier (born 1978), French rally driver
- François Bouffier (1844–1881), French non-commissioned officer
- Frederik Bouffier (born 1990), German politician
- Gabriel Bouffier, French racing cyclist
- Volker Bouffier (born 1951), German politician
