= Diana Stolz =

German politician (born 1976)

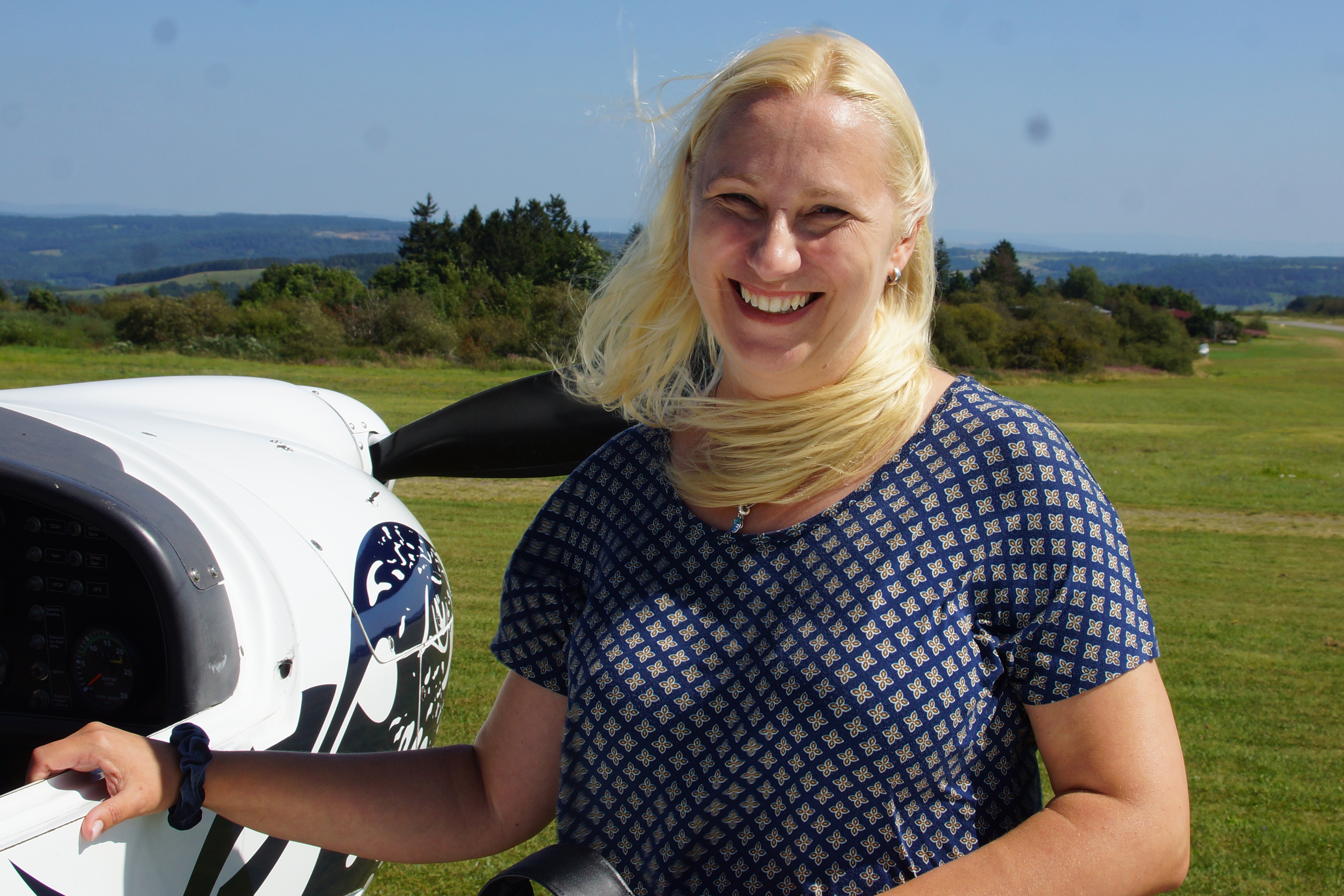
- Stolz in 2024

Minister of Family, Seniors, Sports, Health and Care of Hesse
- Incumbent
- Assumed office 18 January 2024
- Minister-President: Boris Rhein

Personal details
- Born: 13 April 1976 (age 50)
- Party: Christian Democratic Union (since 1997)

Diana Stolz (born 13 April 1976) is a German politician serving as minister of family, seniors, sports, health and care of Hesse since 2024. She has served as chairwoman of the Frauen-Union in Hesse since 2018.
