= R. Alexander Lorz =

German politician (born 1965)

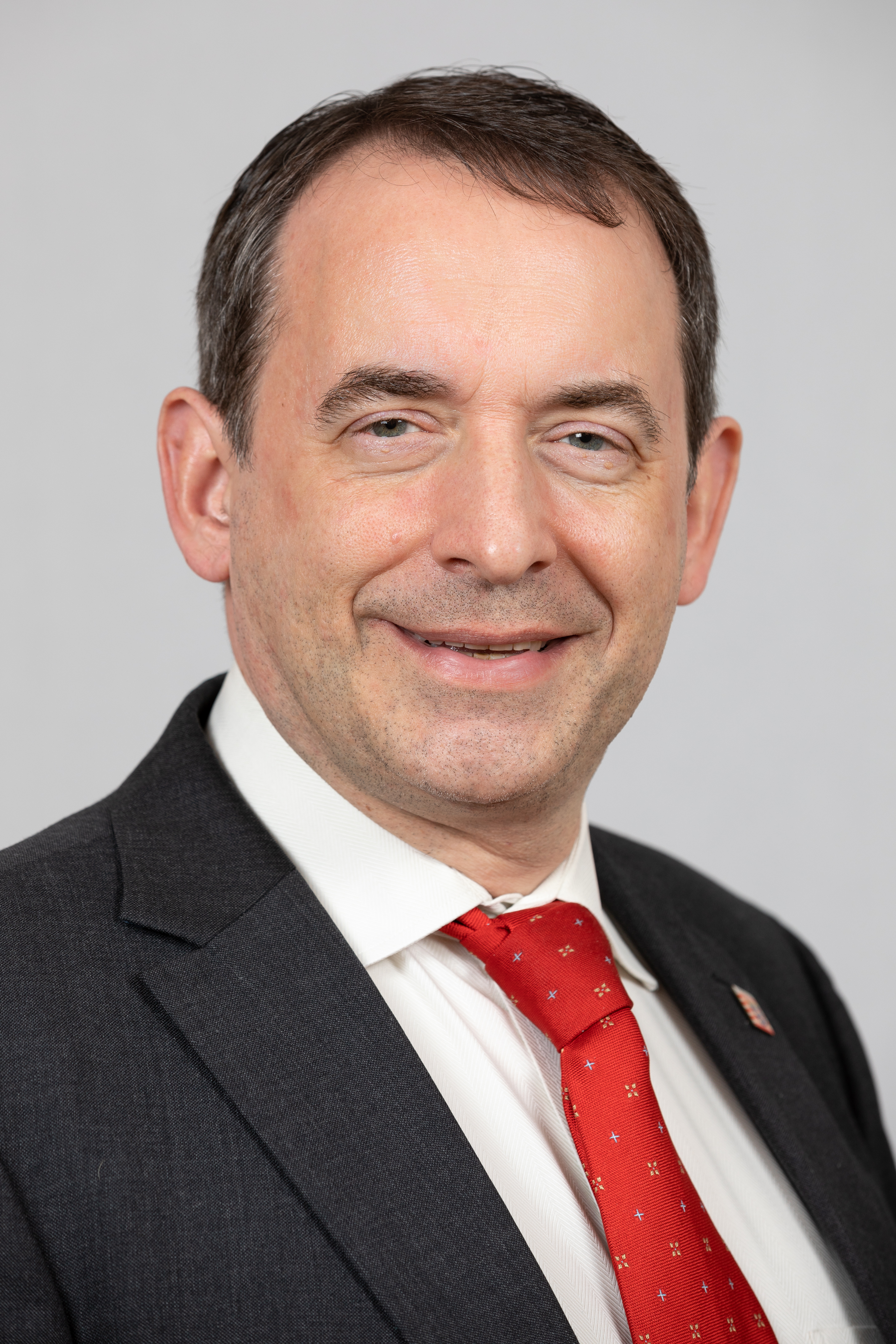
- Lorz in 2019

Minister of Finance of Hesse
- Incumbent
- Assumed office 18 January 2024
- Minister-President: Boris Rhein
- Preceded by: Michael Boddenberg

Personal details
- Born: 30 November 1965 (age 60)
- Party: Christian Democratic Union (since 1984)

Ralph Alexander Lorz (born 30 November 1965) is a German politician who has been serving as minister of finance in the government of Minister-President Boris Rhein of Hesse since 2024. He has been a member of the State Parliament of Hesse (Landtag) since 2019.

== Career ==
From 2000 to 2012, Lorz worked as professor for German and Foreign Public Law, European Law and Public International Law at Heinrich Heine University Düsseldorf.

From 2014 to 2024, Lorz served as State Minister of Culture in the governments of succeessive Ministers-President Volker Bouffier (2014–2022) and Boris Rhein (2022–2024).

== Other activities ==
- Fraport, Member of the Supervisory Board (since 2026)
- KfW, Member of the Supervisory Board (since 2026)
- Helaba, Member of the Supervisory Board (since 2024)
