= Vietnamese-German University =

- Trường Đại học Việt Đức
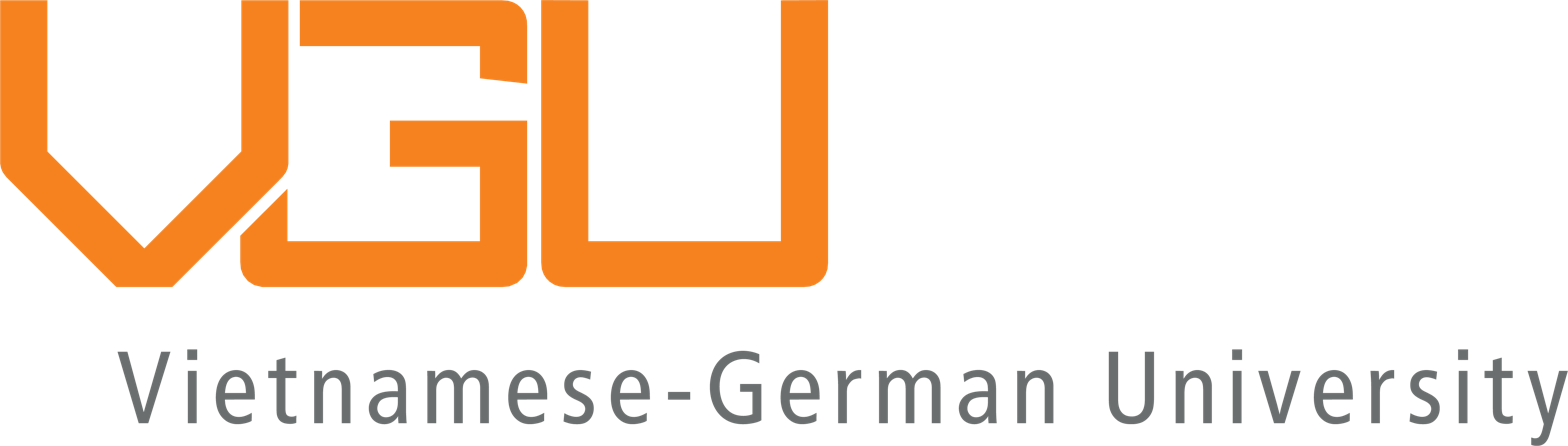

Location
- Ecolakes Mỹ Phước, Ring road 4, Quarter 4, Thới Hòa Ward; Bến Cát, Bình Dương; Vietnam; 11°06′27″N 106°36′51″E

Information
- Type: Public University
- Established: September 1, 2008
- President: Prof. Dr.-ing René Thiele
- Website: www.vgu.edu.vn

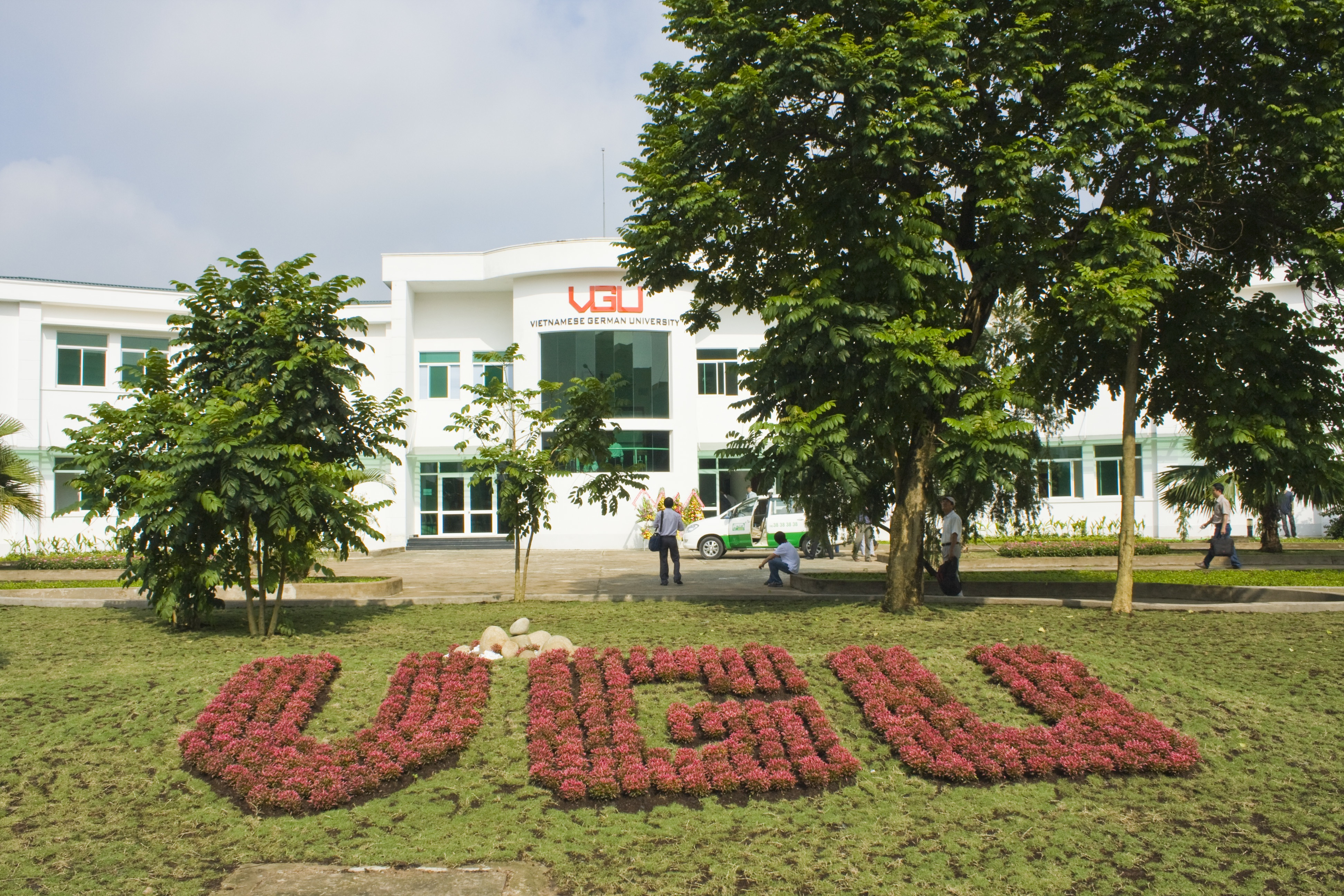
VGU

The Vietnamese–German University (VGU) is a Vietnamese public university, located in Binh Duong, Vietnam. In its administrative and academic structure, VGU follows the German model and standards. VGU was founded officially in March 2008 under the form of a partnership between Vietnam and Germany. In September 2008, VGU had its first intake of students. The university currently offers Bachelor's and Master's programs, covering the fields of engineering, natural sciences, and commerce.

== History ==
The Vietnamese–German University is founded on the cooperation between the Socialist Republic of Vietnam and the German Federal State of Hesse. The initial idea concerning the founding of a Vietnamese–German University came up in 2006. The first agreements were arranged between the Vietnamese then-Minister for Education and Training (MOET), Prof. Dr. Nguyen Thien Nhan, and the Hessen State Minister for Higher Education, Research and the Arts (HMWK), Sir Udo Corts. In May 2007 they signed a Memorandum of Understanding in presence of the then German Federal President Horst Köhler and the President of the Socialist Republic of Vietnam, Nguyễn Minh Triết. The foundation of VGU took place in March 2008. Its first president was Prof. Dr. Wolf Rieck, then President of the University of Applied Sciences, Frankfurt am Main, Germany. Six months later, on September 10, 2008, VGU was opened officially by the then Hessen State Premier, Roland Koch, the Vietnamese then-Minister of Education and Training cum Deputy Prime Minister, Prof. Dr. Nguyen Thien Nhan, and Prof. Dr. Wolf Rieck, President of VGU. Starting in September 2008, 35 students enrolled for VGU's first study program, “Electrical Engineering and Information Technology”, run by the University of Applied Sciences, Frankfurt am Main. Since 2009, VGU has offered four Master's programs, covering engineering areas as well as natural sciences. In the following academic year 2011, two additional Bachelor programs will be launched. A new Master's program will take place in close collaboration with VGU's newly founded “Vietnamese–German Transport Research Centre” (VGTRC). VGU will widen its academic profile by implementing Finance and Economics in its study programs.

VGU receives significant support from the VGU-Consortium, a non-profit organization which is considered as the academic backbone of VGU. More than 30 universities in Germany have joined the VGU-Consortium, including the TU9, an association of the leading German Universities of Technology. Officially founded in 2009, the VGU-Consortium supports VGU's academic and administrative issues. VGU's development is also progressed by the foundation of the University Council in February 2010. Prof. Dr. Nguyen Thien Nhan, Vietnamese Deputy Prime Minister cum former Minister of Education and Training (MOET), was nominated its chairman. Another important milestone for VGU's development is a World Bank loan of US$180 million, which was confirmed in June 2010. The loan is mainly provided for the construction of a new campus in Bình Dương Province, adjacent to Ho Chi Minh City, which will be opened in 2016/17. Progress also happens in its academic development. VGU opened its first research centre, the “Vietnamese–German Transport Research Centre”, in March 2010. It is part of a large, interdisciplinary research centre, the “Research Centre for High-Tech and Sustainability” which VGU is about to establish. Under its roof, VGU plans to establish five research centres: Traffic, Transport, Mobility and Logistics; Renewable Energy Technologies, Lighting Technologies; Sustainable Urban Development; “Green” Technologies and Resource Management; Biodiversity/Climate Change, Biotechnology. VGU's “Research Centre for High-Tech Engineering and Sustainability” is to be constructed on the new campus in Binh Duong Province, adjacent to Ho Chi Minh City. In March 2010, the first research centre, the “Vietnamese–German Transport Research Centre” (VGTRC) was already founded. It is located in Thủ Đức, about four km away from VGU's current campus.

The foundation of the Vietnamese–German University is a part of Vietnamese reform programs concerning the education sector (Higher Education Reform Agenda, HERA). Considering the further modernization of Vietnam, there is a growing need for a better higher education to push up the country's economic development. Therefore, Vietnamese higher education sector must be improved. The Vietnamese government has implemented a reform project, the “New Model University Project” (NMUP): four new universities are to be established within the next few years. Each of them is supported by a partner country and follows the university model of that country. VGU is a part of this program. Four universities will have strong influences on Vietnamese universities and meet Vietnam's education needs.

== Model, Strategies and Organization ==
The foundation of VGU is a novelty: VGU is the first Vietnamese public university which is built up together with international partners and has an autonomous status.

=== Model and strategies ===
The Vietnamese–German University follows the German university model.

==== Model ====
VGU follows the German model and standards in its academic and administrative structures. According to the German university model, research and teaching are combined. Also the university's autonomous status is part of Germany's higher education system: regarding VGU, the institutional and academic freedom is guaranteed in its foundation documents. Furthermore, VGU has a close cooperation with industry: companies in Vietnam as well as in Germany are VGU's cooperation partners. Hereby, technology transfer and innovation are supported.

==== Strategies ====
VGU's main concern is to contribute to Vietnam's economic modernization and development. Therefore, VGU offers a modern education with international standards: working in close collaboration with German partner universities, VGU offers German-accredited programs and is run by German partner universities. The curriculum are continuously adjusted to suit the needs of Vietnamese higher education. Students receive a German university degree after their study at VGU.

Another strategy is to further educate VGU's academia and administrative employees. It is VGU's goal to ensure a “Gradual Handover”: most administrative and academic positions are to be handed over to Vietnamese employees, thus the number of German staff will be reduced.

=== Organization ===
In its academic and administrative structure, VGU follows the German university model. Its autonomous status is highly important.

=== Executive Board of the university ===
The University Council is the most important body in VGU's organizational structure. It consists of twenty members. Its members are nominated by the Vietnamese Ministry of Education and Training (MOET) as well as by the State Ministry for Higher Education, Research and the Arts (HMWK): each Ministry nominates ten members of the University Council. Its Chairman is Prof. Dr. Nguyen Thien Nhan, Vietnamese former-Minister for Education and Training (MOET). VGU's Presidential Board consists of one President and four Vice Presidents which are to be nominated soon. Since March 2008, Prof. Dr. Wolf Rieck has acted as the President of VGU. Vietnamese side and German side are in charge of the nomination of 2 Vice Presidents each. The Academic Senate and an advisory board, consisting of twelve members, complete VGU's organizational structure.

==== Academic structures ====
VGU's academic structures are being developed and progressing within the next few years according to VGU's general development. Interdisciplinary research centres and graduate schools will be established.

=== Stakeholders ===
The Vietnamese–German University is based on the cooperation between the Socialist Republic of Vietnam and the Federal Republic of Germany, especially the State of Hesse. Both countries aim to build an acknowledged research university in Vietnam. VGU is substantially supported by German as well as Vietnamese institutions. Being a Vietnamese State University, Vietnam is in charge of covering the running costs. German institutions such as the State of Hesse, the German Federal government and the State of Baden-Württemberg support VGU financially. The German Academic Exchange Service (DAAD) and the World University Services (WUS, Germany) contribute to VGU's further development by their long-term experience in higher education. Furthermore, German and multi-national companies support VGU. The VGU-Consortium, a non-profit organization plays a significant role for VGU's progress. It consists of more than 30 universities which include the TU9, an association Germany's leading Universities of Technology. The VGU-Consortium coordinates the cooperation with German partner universities and is in charge of academic as well as administrative issues. The VGU-Consortium also seeks to contribute to the internationalization of the German higher education sector. An important milestone in VGU's development is the loan of US$180 million, provided by the World Bank. Approved in June 2010, the loan is mainly used for the construction of the new campus in Binh Duong Province, a blooming town adjacent to Ho Chi Minh City.

== Studies ==
The Vietnamese–German University (VGU) follows the model of German universities of technology. In its teaching and research it focuses on engineering and natural sciences.

=== German programs of study ===
During the transitional phase, VGU imports German programs of study to Vietnam which are run by German partner universities. Bachelor and Master's programs are offered. Within the next few years, VGU will also offer PhD programs. In this transitional phase, students receive two (02) degrees: 01 from German university degree provided by the German partner university and 01 degree from Vietnamese–German University (VGU). The university degrees follow the criteria defined by the Bologna Process. After having established the necessary academic structures, VGU will offer study programmes which are independent from German partner universities. They will be offered by VGU itself. Also the university degrees will be provided by VGU as an acknowledged, autonomous and independent university.

To grant the quality of VGU's programs of study, different measures for quality assurance have been installed, e.g., the programs of study must be accredited in Germany. Furthermore, the teaching staff as well as the programs are evaluated and continuous further training will be delivered to the teaching staff. VGU's programs of study are focused on real-world experiences and industry to improve the student's opportunities on the job market. VGU's profile is furthermore determined by its close cooperation with industry in Germany and Vietnam: research and teaching are to be strengthened by this close cooperation, well-educated future employees are to be trained and technology transfer is to be ensured. The close link to Germany is enforced by exchange semesters to German universities which are offered in some of the programs of study. VGU, considering itself as a gateway to Germany, also offers the possibility of undertaking an internship in German companies.

=== Teaching ===
German professors, lecturing at VGU's German partner universities, are in charge of teaching at VGU. Staying in Ho Chi Minh City for a couple of weeks, they offer single modules in blocked seminars, supported by Vietnamese lecturers. German program coordinators, teaching at VGU's German partner universities and staying in Vietnam for a longer period of time, organize and run the programs of study, customize them to needs of Vietnamese higher education. The medium of instruction at VGU is English. Students are provided with English language courses, run by native teachers. Bachelor's students are to participate in a mandatory “Foundation Year” before the chosen program of study starts: mainly English skills as well as specific basic knowledge such as methodology, needed for the programs of study, are taught. Furthermore, VGU offers German language courses, teaching German and providing students with information about German politics, economy and culture.

==== Undergraduate programs ====
Since September 2008, VGU has offered the Bachelor's program in “Electrical Engineering and Information Technology”. In 2011, “Finance Management” and “Business Information” are offered. The curriculum are run with a close cooperation with German partner universities, e.g. the University of Applied Sciences Frankfurt am Main, Germany is responsible for the Bachelor's program in “Electrical Engineering and Information Technology”. VGU's Bachelor students are to participate in a mandatory “Foundation Year”: it is designed to bridge the gap between Vietnamese and German secondary education. The program focuses mainly on improving the student's English skills, given the fact that the language of instruction at VGU is English. Furthermore, specific basic knowledge such as research methodology that are crucial to the programs study at VGU, is also taught.

==== Post-graduate programs ====
VGU currently offers nine Masters programs:

- Business Information Systems (BIS) in cooperation with the Heilbronn University of Applied Sciences (HHN)
- Computational Engineering (COM) in cooperation with Ruhr University Bochum (RUB)
- Mechatronics and Sensor Systems Technology (MST) run by the University of Applied Sciences, Karlsruhe (HSKA)
- Sustainable Urban Development (SUD) by the Technical University of Darmstadt (TUD)
- Global Production Engineering and Management (GPE) in cooperation with the Technische Universität Berlin (TUB)
- Master in Business Administration" (MBA) in cooperation with the University of Leipzig (LU)
- Water Technology, Reuse and Management (WTE) in cooperation with the Technical University of Darmstadt (TUD)
- IT Security (ITS) in cooperation with Darmstadt University of Applied Sciences (Hochschule Darmstadt - HDA)
- Electrical Engineering (MEE) in cooperation with University of Stuttgart

Doctoral Training programs

VGU provides Doctoral programs in Computational Engineering (COM), Computer Science (CSE), Sustainable Urban Development (SUD), and Sustainable Production Engineering (SPE). Doctoral students will be exempted from the tuition fee and have the opportunity to join a variety of projects with his/her supervisors and colleagues at VGU as a member and/or principal investigators.

==== Tuition Fees and Scholarships ====
The tuition fees become due at the beginning of each semester. Due to generous support by Vietnamese and German institutions, the tuition fees at VGU are quite moderate. Furthermore, VGU offers various scholarships to 25% of the students. The scholarships are valued at 25% to 100% of VGU's tuition fees.

== Research ==
It is VGU's goal to become a leading research university in Vietnam and the region within the next few years. Therefore, interdisciplinary research schools and centers, following the German model, are to be established. VGU plans to build up a “Research Centre for High-Tech Engineering and Sustainability”. It is to be structured as a foundation for single research centers. Five main areas of research have been identified: Energy and Lighting Technology, Traffic, Transport and Logistics, Water Technologies and Water Resource Management, Sustainable Urban Development, and Green Technologies and Resource Management. In March 2010, VGU's first research centre, the “Vietnamese–German Transport Research Centre” (VGTRC), was founded.

== Campus ==
VGU opened its new campus in 2023 at Bến Cát Town, Bình Dương, Vietnam. It is a bigger, more modern and more equipped new campus with state-of-the-art facilities with engineering labs, sports complex, events hall, etc. The World Bank loan of US$180 million, which was approved in June 2010, is mainly for the construction of this new campus. The new campus is now located in Binh Duong Province, 45 km away from HCMC. Next to its teaching buildings, the plans also include VGU's research centers and dormitories. The construction of the new campus is to follow the latest sustainable technologies: renewable energies, ecological construction methods, etc.
