= Kai Klose =

German politician (born 1973)

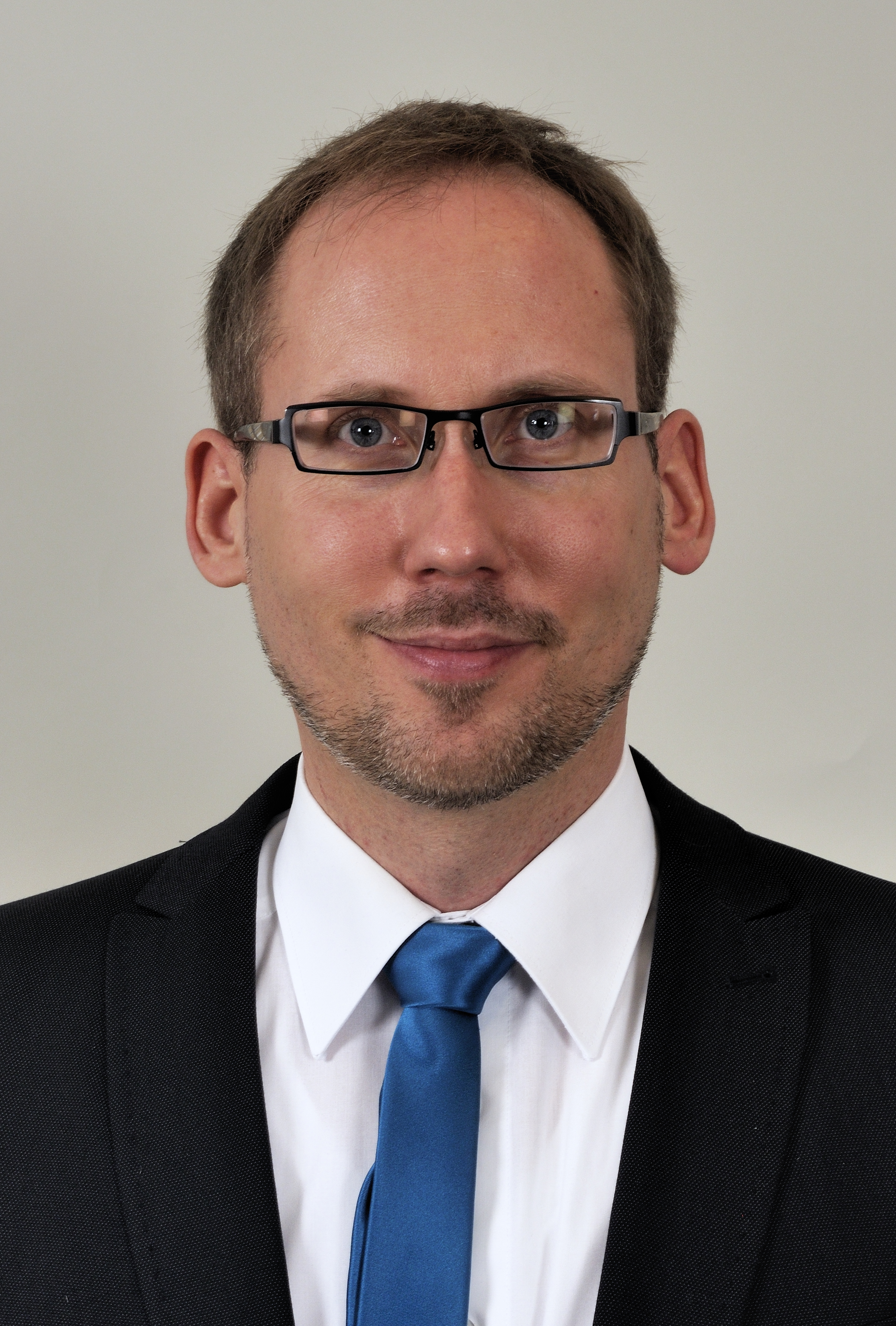
- Klose in 2013

Minister of Social Affairs and Integration of Hesse
- In office 18 January 2019 – 18 January 2024
- Minister-President: Volker Bouffier; Boris Rhein
- Preceded by: Stefan Grüttner
- Succeeded by: Heike Hofmann

Personal details
- Born: 23 December 1973 (age 52) Usingen
- Party: Alliance 90/The Greens (since 1995)

Kai Klose (born 23 December 1973) is a German politician. From 2019 to 2024, he served as minister of social affairs and integration of Hesse. He was a member of the Landtag of Hesse from 2009 to 2017 and from 2019 to 2024. Klose is married.
