= List of minister-presidents of Hesse =

Minister-President of Hesse
- Ministerpräsident des Landes Hessen
- Coat of arms of Hesse

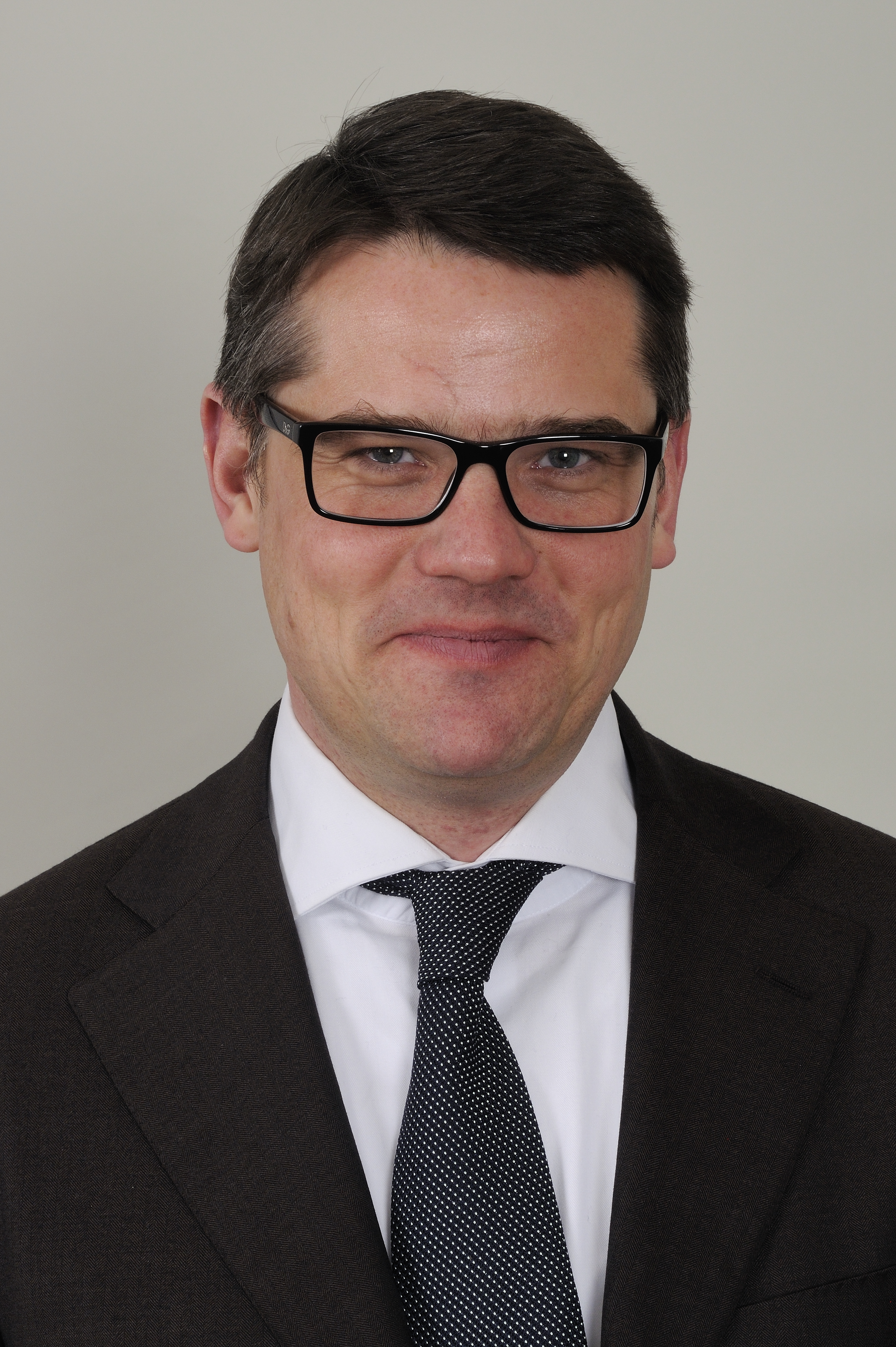
- Incumbent; Boris Rhein since 31 May 2022
- Residence: Wiesbaden
- Appointer: Landtag of Hesse
- Term length: Pending resignation or the election of a successor
- Inaugural holder: Ludwig Bergsträsser (Greater Hesse)
- Formation: 16 September 1945
- Website: Official website

The minister-president of Hesse (German: Ministerpräsident des Landes Hessen), also referred to as the premier or minister-president (also translated into English as the prime minister of Hessen), is the head of government of the German state of Hesse.

The office of the minister-president is known as the state chancellery (German: Hessische Staatskanzlei) and is located in the capital of Wiesbaden, along with the rest of the cabinet departments.

== Historical background ==
The position in its current form was created in 1946, when the provisional state of Greater Hesse was renamed. Greater Hesse had been formed in 1945 after the Second World War from the Prussian Provinces of Kurhessen and Nassau (formed from the Prussian Province of Hesse-Nassau in 1944) and the People's State of Hesse.

The state of Hesse sees itself in the tradition notably of the Grand Duchy of Hesse and the People's State of Hesse (colloquially known as "Hesse-Darmstadt"), having adopted many of its symbols.

== List ==
=== Grand Duchy of Hesse (1819–1918) ===
Minister-presidents of the Grand Duchy of Hesse

- 1819–1829: Carl Ludwig Wilhelm Grolman
- 1829–1848: Karl du Thil
- 1848: Heinrich von Gagern
- 1848–1850: Heinrich Karl Jaup
- 1852–1871: Reinhard Carl Friedrich von Dalwigk
- 1871–1872: Friedrich von Lindelof
- 1872–1876: Karl von Hofmann
- 1876–1884: Julius Rinck von Starck
- 1884–1898: Jacob Finger
- 1898–1906: Karl Rothe
- 1906–1918: Christian Wilhelm Karl Ewald

=== People's State of Hesse (1919–1945) ===
Political party: SPD NSDAP

Portrait	Name (Birth–Death)	Term of office			Political party
Portrait	Name (Birth–Death)	Took office	Left office	Days	Political party
Presidents of the People's State of Hesse
	Carl Ulrich (1853–1933)	21 January 1919	14 February 1928	3311	Social Democratic Party
	Bernhard Adelung (1876–1943)	14 February 1928	13 March 1933	1854	Social Democratic Party
	Ferdinand Werner (1876–1961)	13 March 1933	20 September 1933	191	National Socialist German Workers' Party
	Philipp Wilhelm Jung (1884–1965)	20 September 1933	1 March 1935	527	National Socialist German Workers' Party
	Jakob Sprenger (1884–1945)	Reichsstatthalter		c. 4320	National Socialist German Workers' Party
	Jakob Sprenger (1884–1945)	5 May 1933	March 1945	c. 4320	National Socialist German Workers' Party
	Jakob Sprenger (1884–1945)	Präsident		c. 3650	National Socialist German Workers' Party
	Jakob Sprenger (1884–1945)	1 March 1935	March 1945	c. 3650	National Socialist German Workers' Party

=== Hesse (1945–present) ===
Minister-President of the State of Hesse

Political party: SPD CDU

Portrait	Name (Birth–Death)	Term of office			Political party	Cabinet
Portrait	Name (Birth–Death)	Took office	Left office	Days	Political party	Cabinet
1	Karl Geiler (1878–1953)	16 October 1945	20 December 1946	1 year, 65 days	Independent	I
2	Christian Stock (1884–1967)	20 December 1946	14 December 1950	3 years, 359 days	SPD	I
3	Georg-August Zinn (1901–1976)	14 December 1950	3 October 1969	18 years, 293 days	SPD	I II III IV V
4	Albert Osswald (1919–1996)	3 October 1969	16 October 1976 (resigned)	7 years, 13 days	SPD	I II III
5	Holger Börner (1931–2006)	16 October 1976	23 April 1987	10 years, 189 days	SPD	I II III
6	Walter Wallmann (1932–2013)	23 April 1987	5 April 1991	3 years, 347 days	CDU	I
7	Hans Eichel (born 1941)	5 April 1991	7 April 1999	8 years, 2 days	SPD	I II
8	Roland Koch (born 1958)	7 April 1999	31 August 2010 (resigned)	11 years, 146 days	CDU	I II III
9	Volker Bouffier (born 1951)	31 August 2010	31 May 2022 resigned	11 years, 273 days	CDU	I II III
10	Boris Rhein (born 1972)	31 May 2022	Incumbent	4 years, 99 days	CDU	I II

== See also ==
- List of Hessian monarchs
