= 2013 Hessian state election =

State election in Hesse, Germany

2013 Hesse state election
- 22 September 2013

All 110 seats of the Landtag of Hesse 56 seats needed for a majority
- Turnout: 3,130,871 (73.2%) ▲12.2%
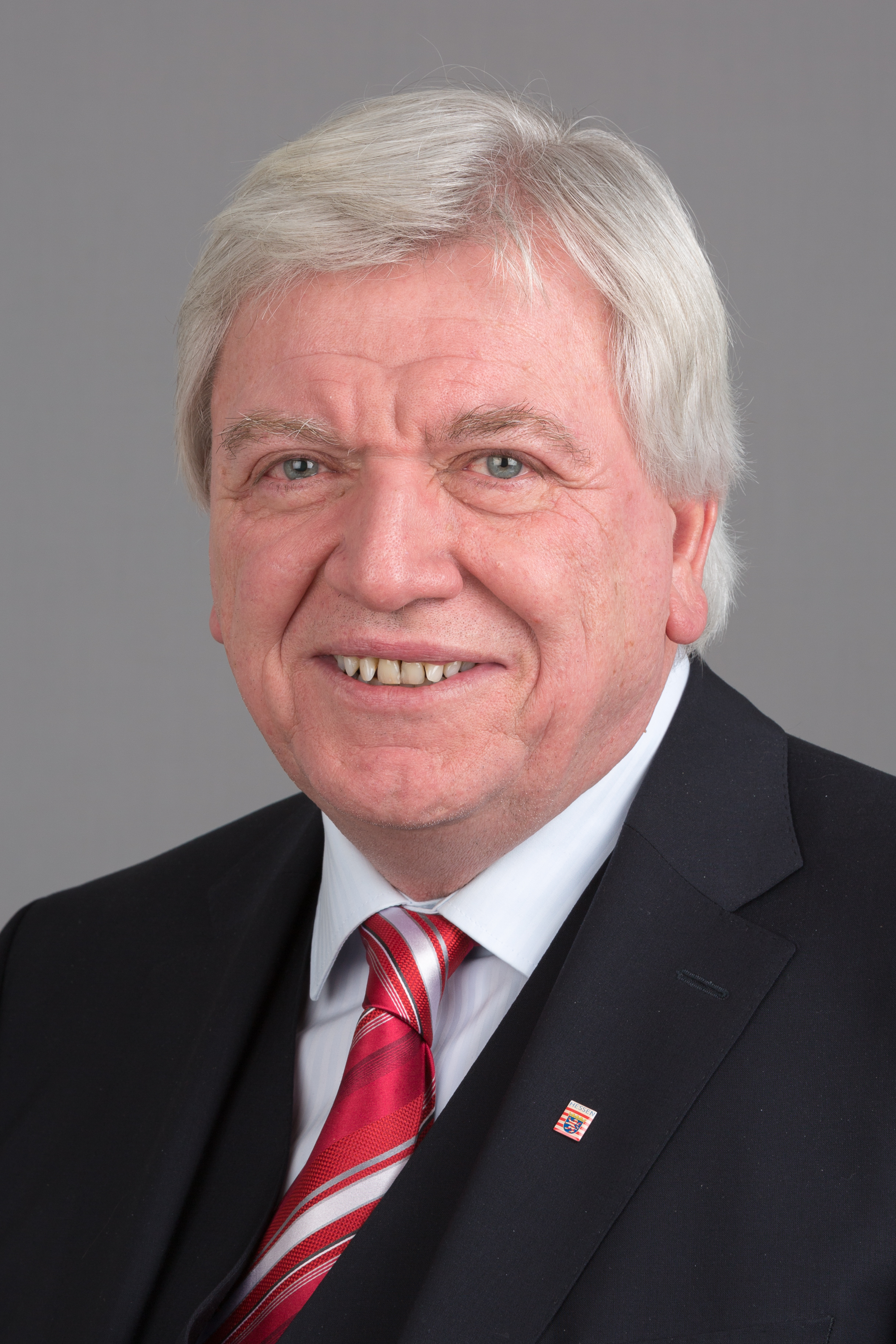

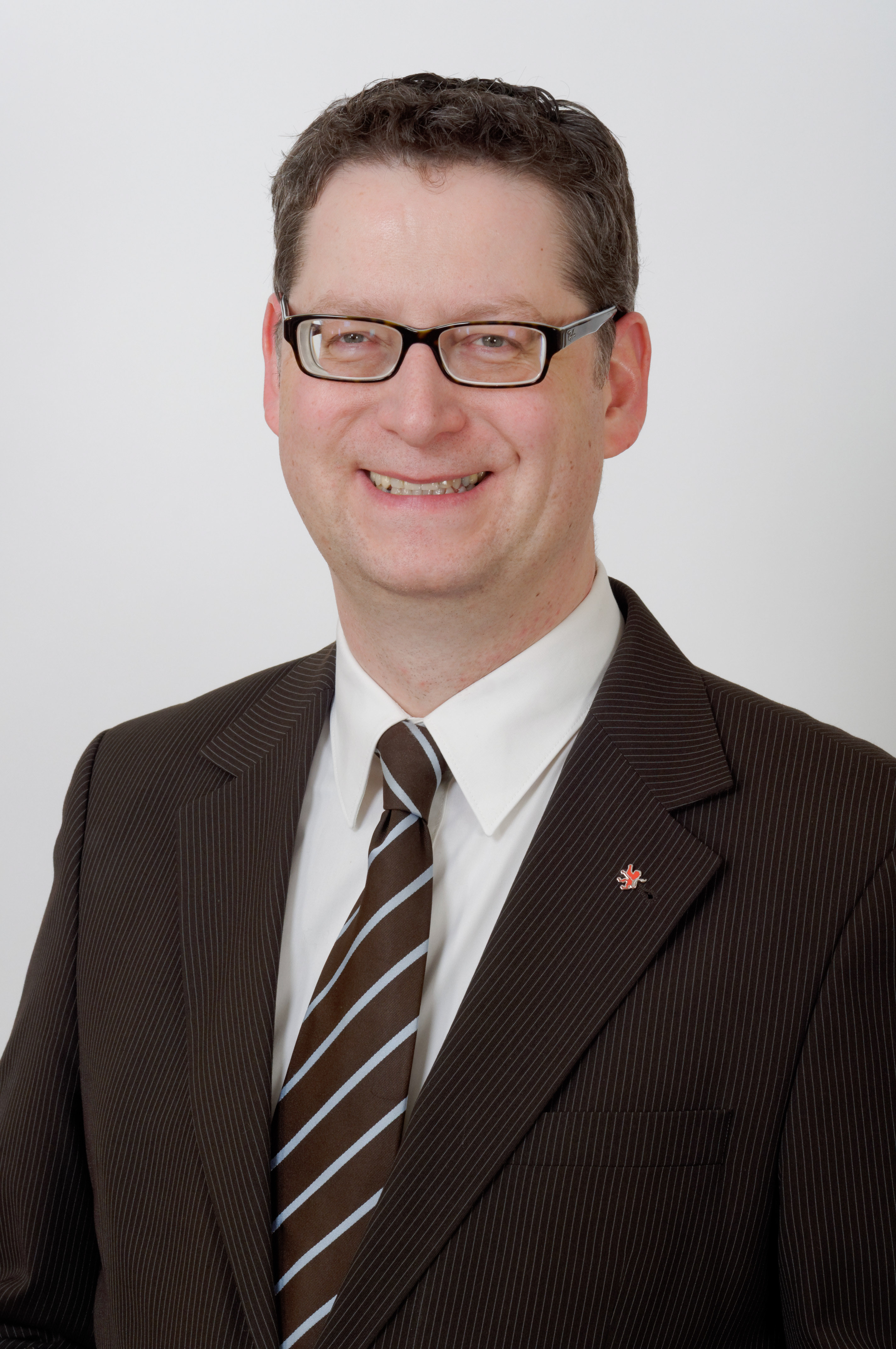

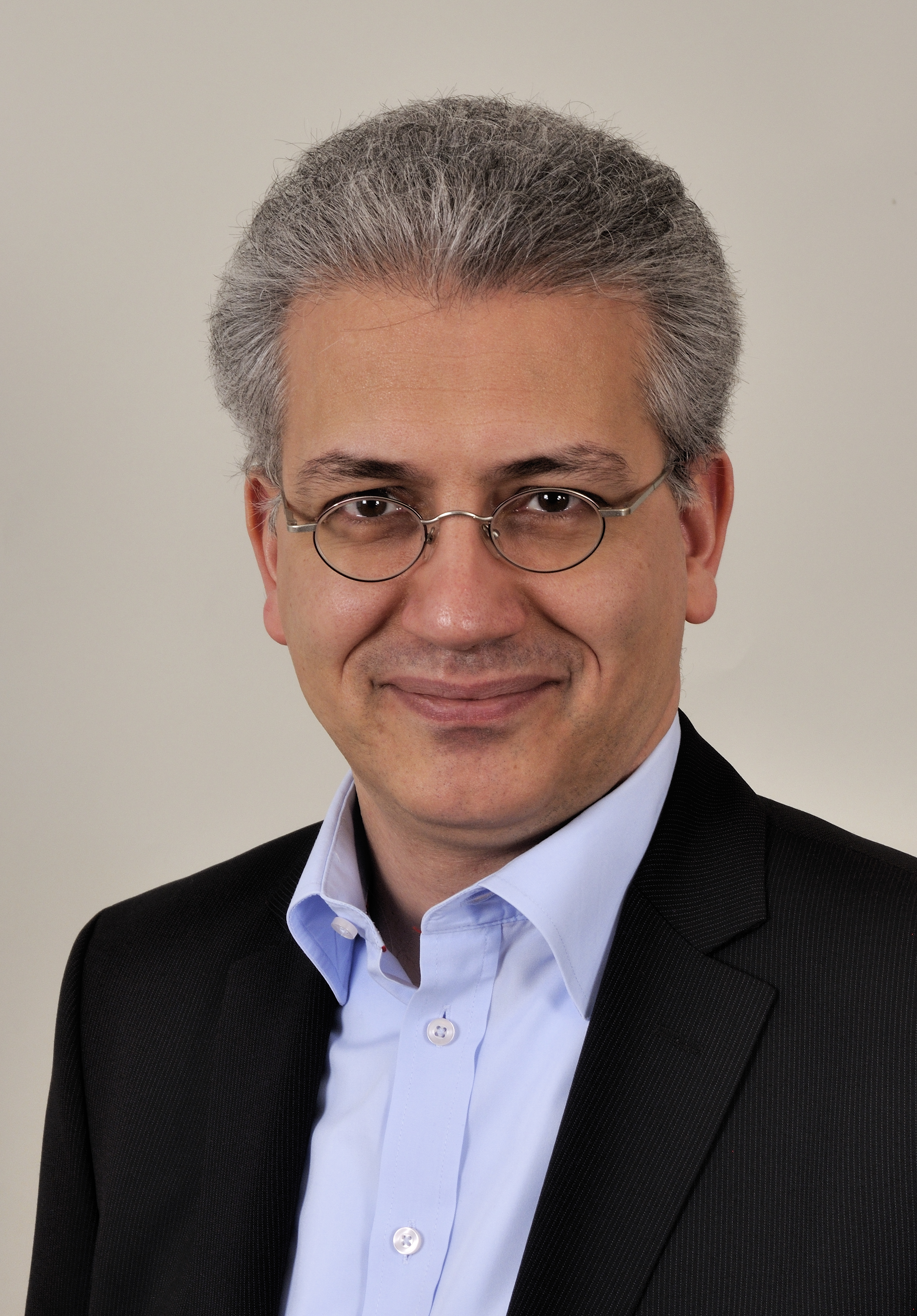

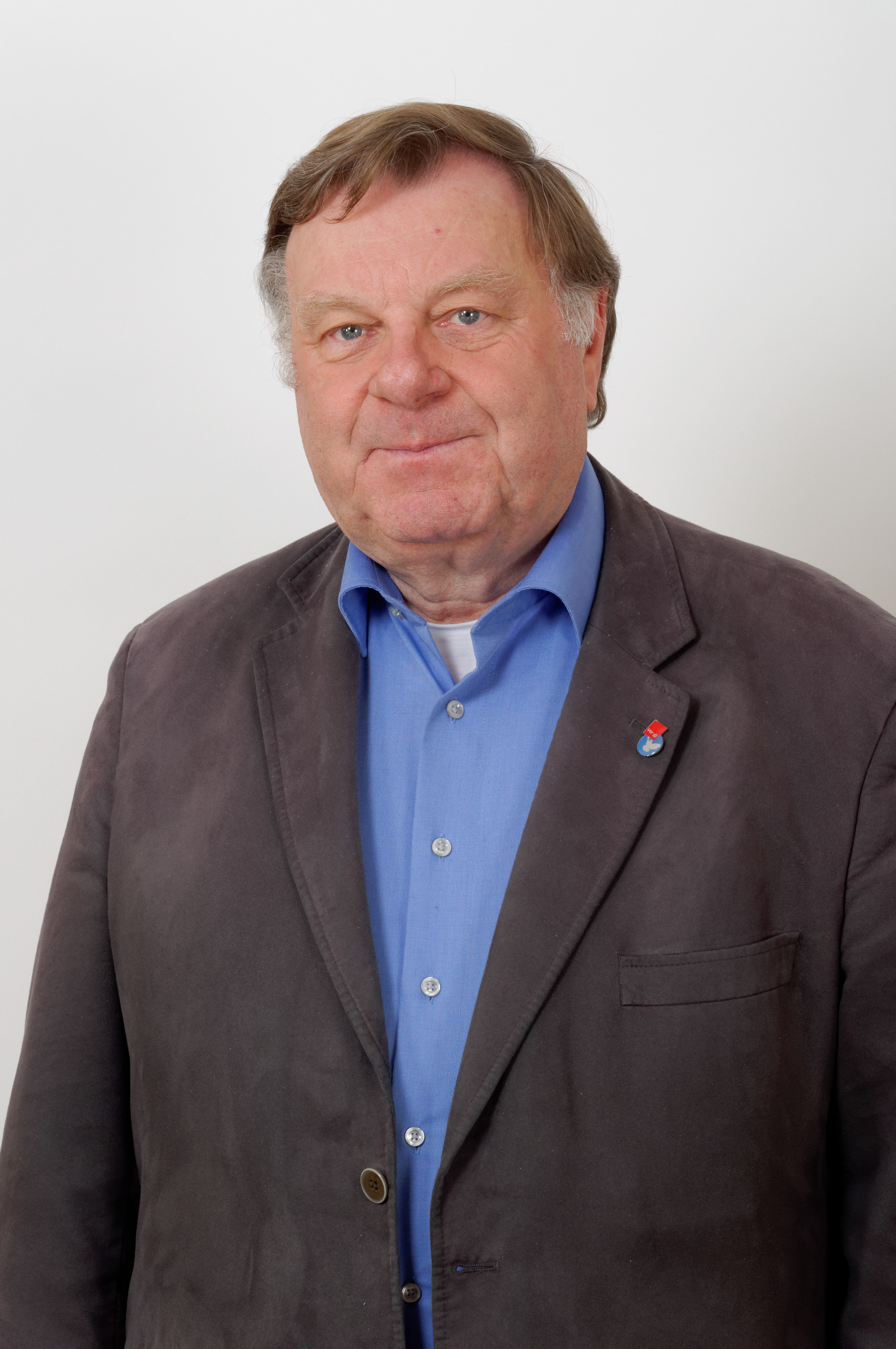

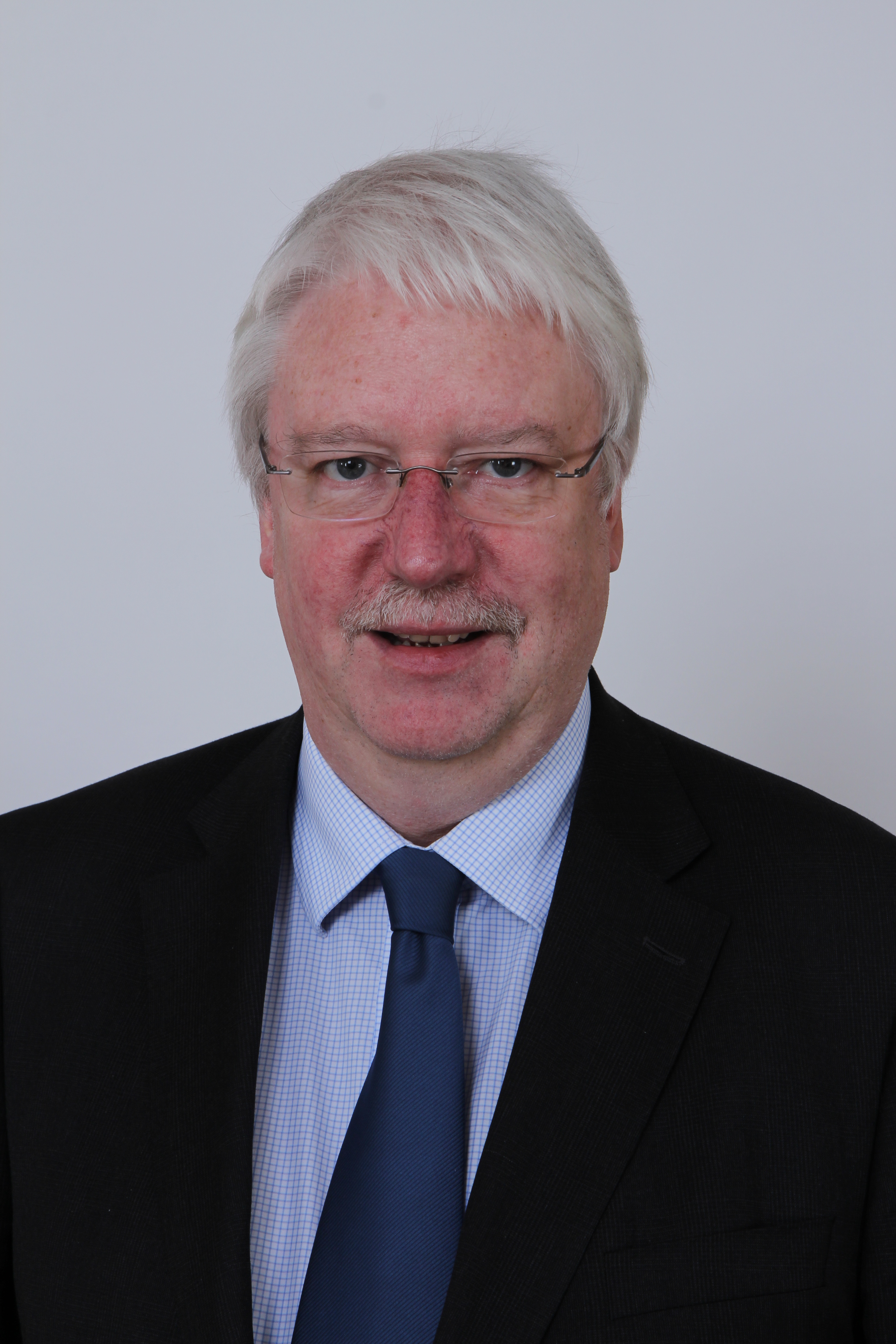
	First party	Second party	Third party
Leader	Volker Bouffier	Thorsten Schäfer-Gümbel	Tarek Al-Wazir
Party	CDU	SPD	Greens
Last election	46 seats, 37.2%	29 seats, 23.7%	17 seats, 13.7%
Seats won	47	37	14
Seat change	▲1	▲8	▼3
Popular vote	1,199,633	961,311	348,661
Percentage	38.3%	30.7%	11.1%
Swing	▲1.1%	▲7.0%	▼2.6%
	Fourth party	Fifth party
Leader	Willi van Ooyen	Jörg-Uwe Hahn
Party	Left	FDP
Last election	6 seats, 5.4%	20 seats, 16.2%
Seats won	6	6
Seat change	0	▼14
Popular vote	161,488	157,451
Percentage	5.2%	5.0%
Swing	▼0.2%	▼11.2%
- Results for the single-member constituencies.
Minister-President before election
First Bouffier cabinet
CDU–FDP
Elected Minister-President
Second Bouffier cabinet
CDU–Green

The 2013 Hessian state election was held on 22 September 2013 to elect the members of the Landtag of Hesse. The election was held on the same day as the 2013 federal election. The incumbent coalition government of the Christian Democratic Union (CDU) and Free Democratic Party (FDP) led by Minister-President Volker Bouffier was defeated. The FDP suffered major losses, exceeding the 5% electoral threshold by under 1,000 votes. After the election, the CDU formed a coalition with The Greens, and Bouffier continued in office.

== Parties ==
The table below lists parties represented in the previous Landtag of Hesse.

Name		Ideology	Leader(s)	2009 result	
Name		Ideology	Leader(s)	Votes (%)	Seats
CDU	Christian Democratic Union of Germany; Christlich Demokratische Union Deutschlands	Christian democracy	Volker Bouffier	37.2%	46 / 118
SPD	Social Democratic Party of Germany; Sozialdemokratische Partei Deutschlands	Social democracy	Thorsten Schäfer-Gümbel	23.7%	29 / 118
FDP	Free Democratic Party; Freie Demokratische Partei	Classical liberalism	Jörg-Uwe Hahn	16.2%	20 / 118
Grüne	Alliance 90/The Greens; Bündnis 90/Die Grünen	Green politics	Tarek Al-Wazir	13.7%	17 / 118
Linke	The Left; Die Linke	Democratic socialism	Willi van Ooyen	5.4%	6 / 118

== Opinion polling ==
Polling firm	Fieldwork date	Sample size	CDU	SPD	FDP	Grüne	Linke	Others	Lead
2013 state election	22 Sep 2013	–	38.3	30.7	5.0	11.1	5.4	9.7	7.6
Infratest dimap	10–12 Sep 2013	1,002	40	32	6	12.5	3.5	6	8
Forschungsgruppe Wahlen	9–11 Sep 2013	1,040	38	30	5.5	13.5	5	8	8
Forsa	29 Aug 2013	2,012	39	28	6	15	4	?	11
Forschungsgruppe Wahlen	19–26 Aug 2013	1,040	38	30	5	15	4	8	8
Infratest dimap	15–18 Aug 2013	1,000	39	31	5	14	4	7	8
Forsa	1–10 Jul 2013	1,134	38	27	6	17	4	8	11
Forschungsgruppe Wahlen	26 Jun–1 Jul 2013	1,018	38	30	5	15	4	8	8
dimap	7–15 May 2013	1,004	39	29	4	17	4	7	10
Forschungsgruppe Wahlen	10–16 Apr 2013	1,010	36	33	5	16	4	?	3
Infratest dimap	28 Nov–3 Dec 2012	1,000	36	31	4	18	5	6	5
Infratest dimap	11–16 Jan 2012	1,000	33	31	3	21	4	8	2
Forschungsgruppe Wahlen	5–7 Dec 2011	1,008	33	32	3	19	3	10	1
Infratest dimap	1–6 Dec 2011	1,000	34	30	4	20	3	9	4
Forschungsgruppe Wahlen	8–11 Nov 2010	1,002	32	29	5	23	4	7	3
2009 state election	18 Jan 2009	–	37.2	23.7	16.2	13.7	5.4	3.7	13.5

== Election result ==
Summary of the 22 September 2013 election results for the Landtag of Hesse
Party	Constituency			Party list				Total seats	+/-
Party	Votes	%	Seats	Votes	%	+/-	Seats	Total seats	+/-
Christian Democratic Union	1,329,746	42.72	41	1,199,633	38.32	+1.13	6	47	▲1
Social Democratic Party	1,092,125	35.09	14	961,896	30.72	+7.01	23	37	▲8
Alliance 90/The Greens	289,830	9.31	0	348,661	11.14	+2.60	14	14	▼3
The Left	160,531	5.16	0	161,488	5.16	-0.21	6	6	0
Free Democratic Party	93,098	2.99	0	157,451	5.03	-11.19	6	6	▼14
Alternative for Germany	42,721	1.37	0	126,906	4.05	New	0	0	New
Pirate Party	62,986	2.02	0	60,159	1.92	+1.39	0	0	0
Free Voters	35,136	1.13	0	38,433	1.23	-0.40	0	0	0
National Democratic Party	–			33,433	1.07	+0.21	0	0	0
Die PARTEI	1,786	0.06	0	15,109	0.48	New	0	0	New
The Republicans	1,930	0.06	0	9,360	0.30	-0.31	0	0	0
Active Democracy Direct	–			4,498	0.14	New	0	0	New
Ecological Democratic Party	–			4,024	0.13	New	0	0	New
Alliance Grey Panthers	606	0.02	0	2,456	0.08	New	0	0	New
Motorists' Interest Party	–			2,453	0.08	New	0	0	New
Noise Pollution, Environment, Politics	751	0.02		1,998	0.06	New	0	0	New
Solidarity Movement	261	0.01	0	1,422	0.05	-0.11	0	0	0
Socialist Equality Party	62	0.00	0	1,311	0.04	New	0	0	New
Renew Democracy	387	0.01	0	–				0	New
Anarchist Pogo Party	306	0.01	0	–				0	New
The Right	300	0.01	0	–				0	New
Ecological Left	34	0.00	0	–				0	New
Total	3,112,596	100.00	55	3,130,781	100.00		55	110	▼8
Invalid	103,610	3.22		85,425	2.66				
Turnout	3,216,206	73.23		3,216,206	73.23	+12.19			
Registered voters	4,392,213			4,392,213					

Following 2013 Hessian election
