= Boris Rhein =

German politician

Boris Rhein MdL MdBR
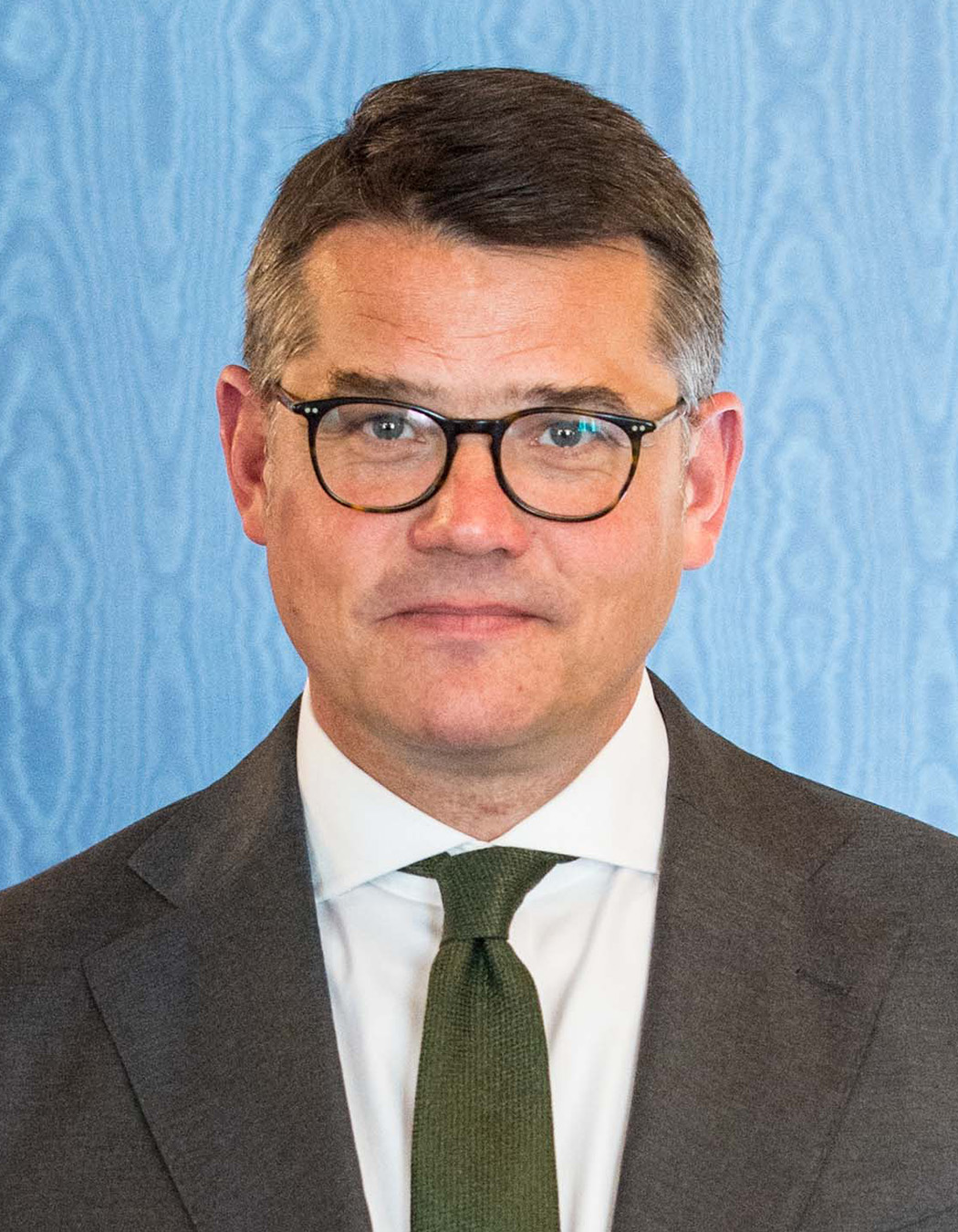
- Rhein in 2019

Minister-President of Hesse
- Incumbent
- Assumed office 31 May 2022
- Deputy: Tarek Al-Wazir; Kaweh Mansoori
- Preceded by: Volker Bouffier

President of the Landtag of Hesse
- In office 18 January 2019 – 31 May 2022
- Preceded by: Norbert Kartmann
- Succeeded by: Astrid Wallmann
Hessian Cabinet
Minister for Science and Art
In office 18 January 2014 – 17 January 2019
Minister-President	Volker Bouffier
Preceded by	Eva Kühne-Hörmann
Succeeded by	Angela Dorn-Rancke
Minister for the Interior and Sport
In office 31 August 2010 – 18 January 2014
Minister-President	Volker Bouffier
Preceded by	Volker Bouffier
Succeeded by	Peter Beuth
State Secretary in the Ministry of the Interior and Sport
In office 5 February 2009 – 31 August 2010 Serving with Horst Westerfeld
Minister-President	Roland Koch
Minister	Volker Bouffier
Preceded by	Oda Scheibelhuber
Succeeded by	Werner Koch
Landtag constituencies
Member of the Landtag of Hesse for Frankfurt am Main
Incumbent
Assumed office 18 January 2014
Preceded by	Gudrun Osterburg
Constituency	Frankfurt am Main VI
In office 5 April 1999 – 14 July 2006
Preceded by	Hans Burggraf
Succeeded by	Hans-Dieter Schnell
Constituency	Frankfurt am Main III

Personal details
- Born: 2 January 1972 (age 54) Frankfurt am Main, Hesse, West Germany (now Germany)
- Party: Christian Democratic Union (1990–)
- Spouse: Tanja Raab-Rhein
- Children: 2
- Education: Goethe University Frankfurt

Boris Rhein (born 2 January 1972) is a German lawyer and politician of the Christian Democratic Union (CDU) who has been serving as Minister-President of Hesse since 2022. He has been active in the politics of Hesse since the late 1990s. After being elected to the Landtag of Hesse in 1999, he served as the state's Minister for the Interior from 2010 until 2014 and as the Minister for Science and Art from 2014 to 2019. On 31 May 2022, he was elected to succeed Volker Bouffier as the Minister-President of Hesse. He led the CDU to a victory in the 2023 Hessian state election.

== Early life and career ==
Rhein was born on 2 January 1972 in Frankfurt am Main. His father, Peter Rhein, headed a department at a local school. After obtaining his Abitur at Frankfurt's Lessing-Gymnasium, Rhein studied law at Goethe University Frankfurt from 1991 until 1997. From 2001 until 2006, he practiced as a lawyer in his hometown.

== Political career ==
In 1990, Rhein joined Junge Union, the youth wing of the Christian Democratic Union of Germany (CDU), and served on organisation's state board from 1996 until 2002.

At the 1999 Hessian state election Rhein was elected to a seat in the Landtag of Hesse, which he occupied until 2006. He then returned to the state parliament at the 2013 Hessian state election. From 2008 to 2012, he led his party in the city of Frankfurt and ran to become its mayor in 2012, but lost to the social democrat Peter Feldmann. Feldmann would be ousted as Mayor by a recall election in the same year he became Minister-President.

Rhein was appointed a Staatssekretär in the Hessian State Ministry of Justice in 2009, but was soon promoted to Staate Minister of the Interior when the CDU-politician Volker Bouffier became the Minister-President of Hesse. His tenure was perceived as conservative by the German media: he endorsed state data retention and a harsher penal code in cases of violence against police officers. In 2014, he was moved to the position of Minister for Science and Art, a position he held until 2019. In the same year, he was elected President of the Hessian Landtag.

=== Minister-President of Hesse, 2022–present ===
In 2022, Volker Bouffier, the state's Minister-President and leader of the Hessian CDU, announced that he would vacate his office and designated Rhein as his successor. According to the German daily Süddeutsche Zeitung, he was chosen over Peter Beuth, the Minister of the Interior, Michael Boddenberg, the Minister of Finance, and Ines Claus, the party's leader in the state parliament, because of his standing with Alliance 90/The Greens, the CDU's coalition partner. He was elected to the office of Minister-President on 31 May 2022.

In his capacity as Minister-President, Rhein has been one of Hesse's representatives on the Bundesrat, where he serves on the Committee on Foreign Affairs and the Defence Committee.

In the 2023 Hessian state election, Rhein's CDU received 34.6% of the vote, remaining the largest party in the state parliament and increasing its share by 7.6%.

== Other activities ==
- Fritz Bauer Institute, Member of the Board (since 2022)
- Hessische Kulturstiftung, Chair of the Board of Trustees (since 2022)
- House of Finance at the Goethe University Frankfurt, Member of the Board of Trustees (since 2022)
- Paul Ehrlich Foundation of the Goethe University Frankfurt, Honorary Chair of the Board of Trustees (since 2022)
- Senckenberg Nature Research Society, Chair of the Board of Trustees (since 2022)

== Political positions ==
Even though Rhein was considered a conservative State Minister of the Interior, he rejected this description of his tenure by saying that the office required a rigid enforcement of the law. Citing sources within the party, Süddeutsche Zeitung writes that Rhein had acquired a more centrist profile in the aftermath of his defeat in the 2012 Frankfurt mayoral election.

== Personal life ==
Rhein is married to Tanja Raab-Rhein, a judge and CDU activist. They have two sons, Oskar and Bruno. He lives in Frankfurt and is a member of the Catholic Church.

== Bibliography ==
- Walker, Amy (28 May 2022). "Der neue Ministerpräsident von Hessen im Überblick". Südwest Presse (in German).
- Niewel, Gianna (29 May 2022). "Dieser Mann will Hessen regieren". Süddeutsche Zeitung (in German).

Political offices
Preceded by Volker Bouffier	Minister-President of Hesse; 2022–present	Incumbent
