= Volker Bouffier =

German politician

Volker Bouffier MdL
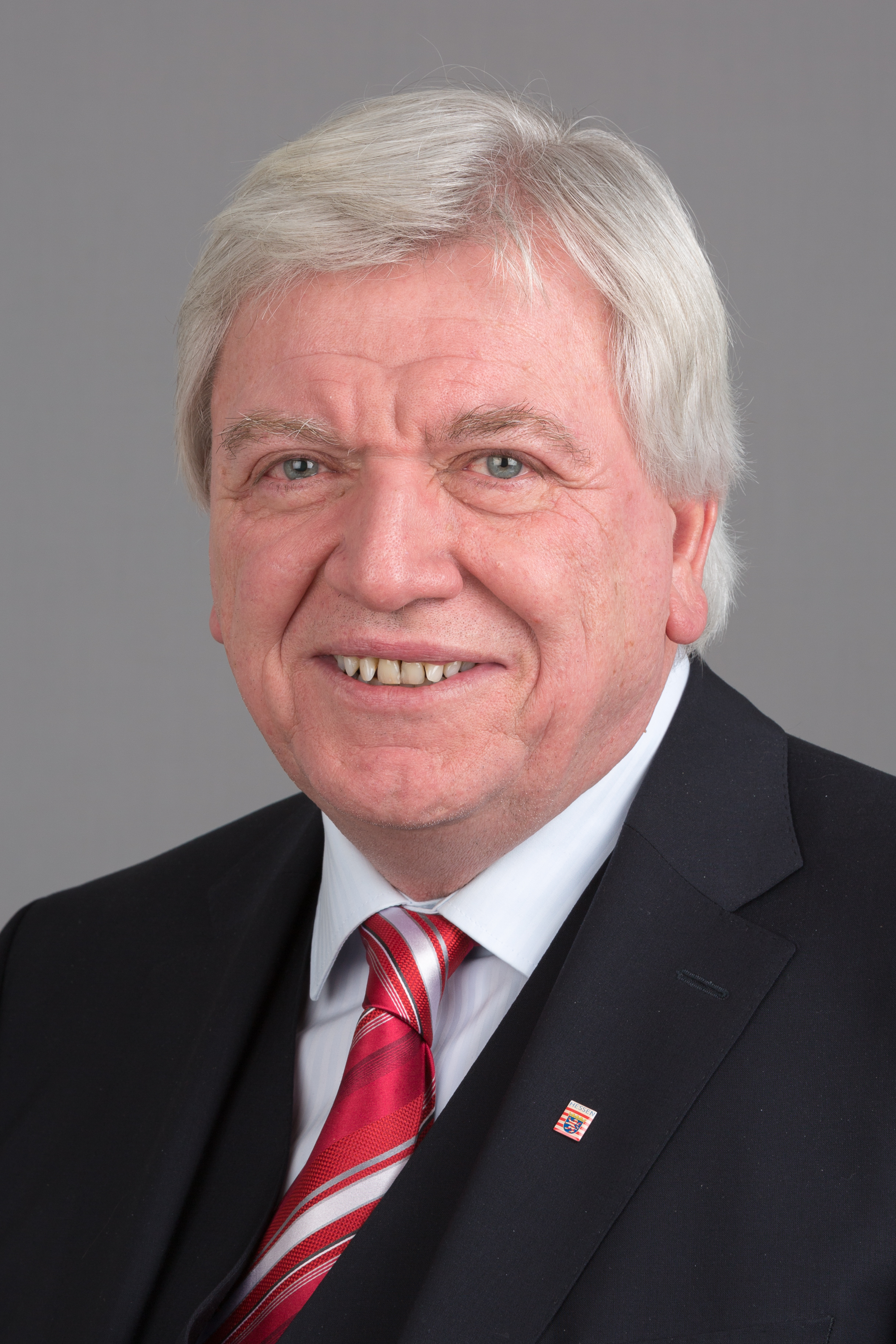
- Bouffier in 2016

Minister-President of Hesse
- In office 31 August 2010 – 31 May 2022
- Deputy: Jörg-Uwe Hahn; Tarek Al-Wazir
- Preceded by: Roland Koch
- Succeeded by: Boris Rhein

Leader of the Christian Democratic Union in Hessen
- Incumbent
- Assumed office 12 July 2010
- Deputy: Eva Kühne-Hörmann
- Preceded by: Roland Koch

Deputy Leader of the Christian Democratic Union
- In office 15 November 2010 – 22 January 2022 Serving with Silvia Breher, Jens Spahn, Julia Klöckner and Thomas Strobl
- Leader: Angela Merkel; Annegret Kramp-Karrenbauer; Armin Laschet
- Preceded by: Roland Koch
- Succeeded by: Michael Kretschmer

President of the Bundesrat
- In office 1 November 2014 – 31 October 2015
- Deputy: Stephan Weil
- Preceded by: Stephan Weil
- Succeeded by: Stanislaw Tillich

Hessian Minister of the Interior and Sport
- In office 7 April 1999 – 31 August 2010
- Minister-President: Roland Koch
- Preceded by: Gerhard Bökel
- Succeeded by: Boris Rhein

Hessian State Secretary for Justice
- In office 24 April 1987 – 5 April 1991
- Minister-President: Walter Wallmann
- Preceded by: Hans Joachim Suchan
- Succeeded by: Dieter Schmidt

Member of the Landtag of Hesse for Giessen II
- Incumbent
- Assumed office 5 April 1999
- Preceded by: Karl Starzacher
- In office 5 April 1991 – 5 April 1999
- Constituency: CDU List
- In office 1 December 1982 – 17 April 1987
- Constituency: CDU List

Personal details
- Born: 18 December 1951 (age 74) Giessen, Hessen, West Germany
- Party: CDU

Volker Bouffier (born 18 December 1951) is a German politician of the Christian Democratic Union (CDU) who served as Minister President of the German state of Hessen from 31 August 2010 to 31 May 2022. From 1 November 2014 until 31 October 2015 he was President of the Bundesrat and ex officio deputy to the President of Germany.

Bouffier has been serving as the chairman of the CDU in Hesse since July 2010. From 1999 to 2010, he was State Minister of Interior and Sports in of Hessen. Bouffier is a lawyer by profession. Because of his participation in state government, he is the longest serving Member of the Bundesrat, representing Hessen since 1999.

== Early life and career ==
Bouffier grew up in Giessen. His father Robert Bouffier (1920–1999) was a lawyer and CDU local politician in Giessen; his grandfather Robert Ferdinand August Bouffier (1883–1971) moved from Strasbourg to Giessen in 1906, where he later became a CDU politician. His paternal family is of French Huguenot ancestry.

He studied law at the University of Giessen and completed his studies in 1977. From 1975 to 1978 he was a research assistant in public law at the University of Giessen, and in 1978 he was called to the bar. He practiced law for many years in addition to his political activities and is currently an inactive partner in the law firm Bouffier & Wolf.

In 2024 he took part in a musical project called "Ein offenes Herz" by electronic musician Thomas Albertsen (Globotom) reciting quotes from Johann Wolfgang v. Goethe's novel "The Sorrows of Young Werther".

== Political career ==
Bouffier was leader of the Hessian Young Union, the youth organisation of the CDU, from 1978 to 1984.

Bouffier was first elected to the Parliament of the State of Hesse in 1982. He served as State Minister of the Interior and Sports in the government of Minister-President Roland Koch from 1999 to 2010.

When Koch announced his withdrawal from the political scene and resigned in August 2010, he nominated Bouffier as his successor to lead the center-right CDU-FDP government that was formed after the 2009 state elections.

In the negotiations to form a coalition government of the Christian Democrats (CDU together with the Bavarian CSU) and the Free Democratic Party (FDP) following the 2009 federal elections, Bouffier was part of the CDU/CSU delegation in the working group on internal and legal affairs, led by Wolfgang Schäuble and Sabine Leutheusser-Schnarrenberger.

In 2010, Bouffier was elected vice chairman of the CDU and has since been serving in the party's national leadership under successive chairwomen Angela Merkel (2012–2018) and Annegret Kramp-Karrenbauer (since 2018). On 7 June 2011, he was among the guests invited to the state dinner hosted by President Barack Obama in honor of Chancellor Angela Merkel at the White House.

Under Bouffier's leadership, Hesse joined forces with Bavaria in early 2013 to launch a constitutional challenge to the Germany's system of tax transfers in order to stop subsidising spending in the city of Berlin, the national capital, and all the poorer states. At the time, Hesse was the third largest net contributor, with an annual transfer of almost €1.3 billion.

On 8 February 2013, Bouffier agreed to the proposal of the President Joachim Gauck to hold the state elections on the same day as Germany's federal elections. When the official result gave no major parties and their traditional coalition partners a clear majority in the parliament, Bouffier decided to break ranks with the rest of Chancellor Angela Merkel's conservative party and seek a coalition government with the Greens rather than the Social Democrats (SPD). He thereby created only the second CDU-Green coalition to govern a German state, after the previous government of Hamburg. On the federal level, he was part of the 15-member leadership circle chaired by Merkel, Horst Seehofer and Sigmar Gabriel in the negotiations to form a coalition government.

As one of the state's representatives at the Bundesrat, Germany's upper house of parliament, Bouffier is a member of the Committee on Foreign Affairs and the Committee on Defence. In October 2015, while he held the rotating presidency of the Bundesrat, he hosted the three-day festivities for the 25th anniversary of the reunification of the former East and West German states.

On 25 February 2022, Bouffier announced his resignation from the post of minister-president which will become effective on 31 May.

== Other activities ==
=== Corporate boards ===
- Helaba, Member of the Board of Public Owners (2010–2022)
- KfW, Member of Board of Supervisory Directors (2011–2013)

=== Non-profit organizations ===
- Committee for the preparation of the Reformation anniversary 2017, ex-officio member of the board of trustees
- Deutsches Museum, member of the board of trustees
- Hessische Kulturstiftung, chairman of the board of trustees (2010–2022)
- House of Finance at the Goethe University Frankfurt, member of the board of trustees
- Paul Ehrlich Foundation of the Goethe University Frankfurt, honorary chairman of the board of trustees
- Senckenberg Nature Research Society, chairman of the board of trustees
- Stiftung Deutsche Sporthilfe, member of the board of trustees
- Landesstiftung Miteinander in Hessen, chairman of the board of trustees
- Peace Research Institute Frankfurt (HSFK), member of the board of trustees
- Fritz Bauer Institute, member of the board of trustees
- Stiftung Flughafen Frankfurt/Main für die Region - chairman of the board
- Internatsschule Schloss Hansenberg, chairman of the board of trustees
- Bad Hersfelder Festspiele, patron
- Filmbildung – Jetzt!, German Film Institute, Honorary Chairman of the board of trustees
- Frankfurt Biotechnology Innovation Center (FiZ), Chairman of the Supervisory Board (2010–2022)

== Political positions ==
Ahead of the 2021 Christian Democratic Union of Germany leadership election, Bouffier publicly opposed Friedrich Merz as candidate to succeed Annegret Kramp-Karrenbauer as the party's chair. Instead, he publicly endorsed Armin Laschet's candidacy.

== Controversy ==
German politicians from across the political spectrum criticized Deutsche Bank co-CEO Jürgen Fitschen in December 2012 following reports he had telephoned Bouffier to complain about a raid on the bank's Twin Towers in Frankfurt – even though Bouffier's office was not directly responsible for overseeing the action.

During the trial of Beate Zschäpe for the NSU murders, the BfV agent Andreas Temme who was at the scene of one of the murders, yet claimed not to have noticed it, was accused by the prosecution of having sympathies towards Neo-Nazism himself, thus casting doubt on his testimony. Bouffier, then interior minister of Hesse, shielded Temme from further investigations, citing protection of undercover agents.

== Personal life ==
Bouffier is married to his wife Ursula, a former radiology assistant. In early 2019, he underwent treatment for skin cancer. In 2024, he took part in a musical project called "Ein offenes Herz" by electronic musician Thomas Albertsen (Globotom), reciting quotes from Johann Wolfgang v. Goethe's novel The Sorrows of Young Werther.

Political offices
Preceded by Roland Koch	Minister-President of Hesse; 2010–2022	Succeeded by Boris Rhein
