= Politics of Hesse =

Overview of the politics of the German state of Hesse

The politics of Hesse takes place within a framework of a federal parliamentary representative democratic republic, where the Federal Government of Germany exercises sovereign rights with certain powers reserved to the states of Germany including Hesse. The state has a multi-party system where, as in most other states of former Western Germany and the federal level, the three main parties are the centre-right Christian Democratic Union (CDU), the far-right Alternative for Germany (AfD), and the centre-left Social Democratic Party of Germany (SPD).

The Christian Democratic Union (CDU) has been the largest party in every election since the 1995 Hessian state election.

== Governments of Hesse ==
The governments and ministers-President (Ministerpräsidenten) of the People's State of Hesse during the time of the Weimar Republic were:

1. 1919–1928: Center-right government, an SPD–DDP–Zentrum coalition led by Carl Ulrich (SPD) as minister-president
2. 1928–1933: Center-right government, an SPD–DDP–Zentrum coalition led by Bernhard Adelung (SPD) as minister-president

The governments of the National Socialist era:

1. 1933: National Socialist government with Ferdinand Werner (NSDAP) as minister-president
2. 1933–1935: National Socialist government with Philipp Wilhelm Jung (NSDAP) as minister-president
3. 1935–1945: National Socialist government with Jakob Sprenger (NSDAP) as minister-president

The governments and minister-Presidents of Hesse since the establishment of the Federal Republic of Germany:

1. 1945: Military occupation provisional government led by Ludwig Bergsträsser(SPD), appointed by the U.S. Military
2. 1945–1946: Military occupation provisional government led by Karl Geiler (no party), appointed by the U.S. military
3. 1946–1950: Theoretically a CDU–SPD grand coalition with Christian Stock (SPD) as minister-president, though U.S. Military Occupation remained through 1949.
4. 1950–1969: First truly non-military government of the Federal Republic, led by Georg-August Zinn (SPD), whose SPD ruled in coalition with the All-German Bloc/League of Expellees and Deprived of Rights, a party of expelled eastern Germans whose political goal was to retrieve their homelands (heimatlaender); and also with the League of Expellees' successors party the Gesamtdeutsche Partei.
5. 1969–1976: Center-left government of the SPD-FDP, with Albert Osswald (SPD) as minister-president
6. 1976–1982: Center-left government of the SPD-FDP continued with Holger Börner (SPD) as minister-president.
7. 1982–1984: Center-left government of the SPD (single party rule) with Holger Börner (SPD) as minister-president.
8. 1984–1987: Center-left government of the SPD–Greens with Holger Börner (SPD) as minister-president.
9. 1987–1991: Center-right government of the CDU–FDP with Walter Wallmann (CDU) as minister-president.
10. 1991–1999: Center-left government of the SPD–Greens with Hans Eichel (SPD) as minister-president.
11. 1999–2003: Center-right government of the CDU–FDP with Roland Koch (CDU) as minister-president.
12. 2003–2009: Center-right government of the CDU (single party rule) with Roland Koch (CDU) as minister-president.
13. 2009–2010: Center-right government of the CDU-FDP with Roland Koch (CDU) as minister-president.
14. 2010–2014: Center-right government of the CDU–FDP with Volker Bouffier (CDU) as minister-president.
15. 2014–2019: Center-right government of the CDU–Greens with Volker Bouffier (CDU) as minister-president.
16. 2019–2022: Center-right government of the CDU–Greens with Volker Bouffier (CDU) as minister-president. Bouffier resigned in 2022, thus prematurely ending his third term serving as minister-president.
17. 2022–present: Center-right government of the CDU–Greens with Boris Rhein (CDU) as minister-president.

Since 1950, the SPD has been in the Hesse government 45 years, the CDU for 28 years; the FDP acted as coalition partners with either CDU or SPD for 21 years (13 with SPD, 8 with CDU).

== Landtag of Hesse ==
=== Party strength in the Landtag ===
Election year	Total seats	Seats won							
Election year	Total seats	SPD	CDU	FDP	GB/BHE	Grüne	Linke	AfD	Other
Dec 1946	90	38	28	14					10 (Note: KPD)
1950	80	47	12	21		A90			
1954	96	44	24	21	7				
1958	96	48	32	9	7				
1962	96	51	28	11	6				
1966	96	52	26	10					8 (Note: NDP)
1970	110	53	46	11					
1974	110	49	53	8					
1978	110	50	53	7					
1982	110	49	52			9			
1983	110	51	44	8		7			
1987	110	44	47	9		10			
1991	110	46	46	8		10			
1995	110	44	45	8		13			
1999	110	46	50	6		8			
2003	110	33	56	9		12			
2008	110	42	42	11		9	6		
2009	118	29	46	20		17	6		
2013	110	37	47	6		14	6		
2018	137	29	40	11		29	9	19	
2023	133	23	52	8		22		28	

=== Legislative compositions ===
1st Landtag, following December 1946 election

2nd Landtag, following 1950 election

3rd Landtag, following 1954 election

4th Landtag, following 1958 election

5th Landtag, following 1962 election

6th Landtag, following 1966 election

7th Landtag, following 1970 election

8th Landtag, following 1974 election

9th Landtag, following 1978 election

10th Landtag, following 1982 election

11th Landtag, following 1983 election

12th Landtag, following 1987 election

13th Landtag, following 1991 election

14th Landtag, following 1995 election

15th Landtag, following 1999 election

16th Landtag, following 2003 election

17th Landtag, following 2008 election

18th Landtag, following 2009 election

19th Landtag, following 2013 election

20th Landtag, following 2018 election

21st Landtag, following 2023 election

=== State election results maps ===
December 1946 Hessian state election

1950 Hessian state election

1954 Hessian state election

1958 Hessian state election

1962 Hessian state election

1966 Hessian state election

1970 Hessian state election

1974 Hessian state election

1978 Hessian state election

1982 Hessian state election

1983 Hessian state election

1987 Hessian state election

1991 Hessian state election

1995 Hessian state election

1999 Hessian state election

2003 Hessian state election

2008 Hessian state election

2009 Hessian state election

2013 Hessian state election

2018 Hessian state election

2023 Hessian state election

=== Constituencies in the Landtag ===
- Kassel-Land I (01)
- Kassel-Land II (02)
- Kassel-Stadt I (03)
- Kassel-Stadt II (04)
- Waldeck-Frankenberg I (05)
- Waldeck-Frankenberg II (06)
- Schwalm-Eder I (07)
- Schwalm-Eder II (08)
- Eschwege-Witzenhausen (09)
- Rotenburg (10)
- Hersfeld (11)
- Marburg-Biedenkopf I (12)
- Marburg-Biedenkopf II (13)
- Fulda I (14)
- Fulda II (15)
- Lahn-Dill I (16)
- Lahn-Dill II (17)
- Gießen I (18)
- Gießen II (19)
- Vogelsberg (20)
- Limburg-Weilburg I (21)
- Limburg-Weilburg II (22)
- Hochtaunus I (23)
- Hochtaunus II (24)
- Wetterau I (25)
- Wetterau II (26)
- Wetterau III (27)
- Rheingau-Taunus I (28)
- Rheingau-Taunus II (29)
- Wiesbaden I (30)
- Wiesbaden II (31)
- Main-Taunus I (32)
- Main-Taunus II (33)
- Frankfurt am Main I (34)
- Frankfurt am Main II (35)
- Frankfurt am Main III (36)
- Frankfurt am Main IV (37)
- Frankfurt am Main V (38)
- Frankfurt am Main VI (39)
- Main-Kinzig I (40)
- Main-Kinzig II (41)
- Main-Kinzig III (42)
- Offenbach-Stadt (43)
- Offenbach Land I (44)
- Offenbach Land II (45)
- Offenbach Land III (46)
- Groß-Gerau I (47)
- Groß-Gerau II (48)
- Darmstadt-Stadt I (49)
- Darmstadt-Stadt II (50)
- Darmstadt-Dieburg I (51)
- Darmstadt-Dieburg II (52)
- Odenwald (53)
- Bergstraße I (54)
- Bergstraße II (55)

== Constituencies in the Bundestag ==
No	Constituency	Member	2021	Voters	2017	2013	2009	2005	2002	1998	1994	1990
166	Waldeck	Esther Dilcher	SPD	184,073	SPD	CDU	SPD	SPD	SPD	SPD	SPD	SPD
167	Kassel	Timon Gremmels	SPD	218,474	SPD	SPD	SPD	SPD	SPD	SPD	SPD	SPD
168	Werra-Meißner – Hersfeld-Rotenburg	Michael Roth	SPD	171,886	SPD	SPD	SPD	SPD	SPD	Created for 2002 election		
169	Schwalm-Eder	Edgar Franke	SPD	185,944	SPD	SPD	SPD	SPD	SPD	SPD	SPD	SPD
170	Marburg	Sören Bartol	SPD	181,588	SPD	SPD	SPD	SPD	SPD	SPD	SPD	CDU
171	Lahn-Dill	Dagmar Schmidt	SPD	206,532	CDU	CDU	CDU	SPD	SPD	SPD	SPD	SPD
172	Gießen	Felix Döring	SPD	217,514	CDU	CDU	CDU	SPD	SPD	SPD	SPD	SPD
173	Fulda	Michael Brand	CDU	208,542	CDU	CDU	CDU	CDU	CDU	CDU	CDU	CDU
174	Main-Kinzig – Wetterau II – Schotten	Bettina Müller	SPD	178,307	CDU	CDU	Created for 2013 election					
175	Hochtaunus	Markus Koob	CDU	179,842	CDU	CDU	CDU	CDU	CDU	CDU	CDU	CDU
176	Wetterau I	Natalie Pawlik	SPD	176,897	CDU	CDU	CDU	SPD	SPD	SPD	CDU	CDU
177	Rheingau-Taunus – Limburg	Klaus-Peter Willsch	CDU	220,466	CDU	CDU	CDU	CDU	CDU	CDU	CDU	CDU
178	Wiesbaden	Ingmar Jung	CDU	186,735	CDU	CDU	CDU	SPD	SPD	SPD	CDU	CDU
179	Hanau	Lennard Oehl	SPD	176,271	CDU	CDU	CDU	SPD	SPD	SPD	CDU	CDU
180	Main-Taunus	Norbert Altenkamp	CDU	195,514	CDU	CDU	CDU	CDU	CDU	Created for 2002 election		
181	Frankfurt am Main I	Armand Zorn	SPD	201,216	CDU	CDU	CDU	SPD	SPD	CDU	CDU	CDU
182	Frankfurt am Main II	Omid Nouripour	Grüne	227,207	CDU	CDU	CDU	CDU	SPD	SPD	CDU	CDU
183	Groß-Gerau	Melanie Wegling	SPD	174,082	CDU	CDU	CDU	SPD	SPD	SPD	CDU	SPD
184	Offenbach	Björn Simon	CDU	219,511	CDU	CDU	CDU	CDU	SPD	SPD	CDU	CDU
185	Darmstadt	Andreas Larem	SPD	240,763	CDU	SPD	SPD	SPD	SPD	CDU	SPD	
186	Odenwald	Jens Zimmermann	SPD	233,901	CDU	CDU	CDU	CDU	SPD	SPD	CDU	CDU
187	Bergstraße	Michael Meister	CDU	197,782	CDU	CDU	CDU	CDU	SPD	SPD	CDU	CDU

== See also ==
- History of Hesse
- Landtag of Hesse
- Rulers of Hesse – the hereditary rulers of the Grand Duchy of Hesse prior to 1919
