= December 1946 Hessian state election =

German state election

- 1 December 1946

All 90 seats in the Landtag of Hesse 46 seats needed for a majority
- Turnout: 1,741,416 (73.2% ▲2.2pp)
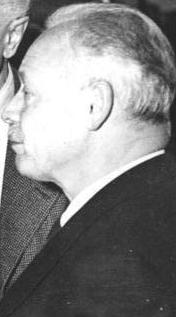

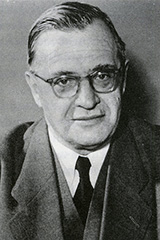

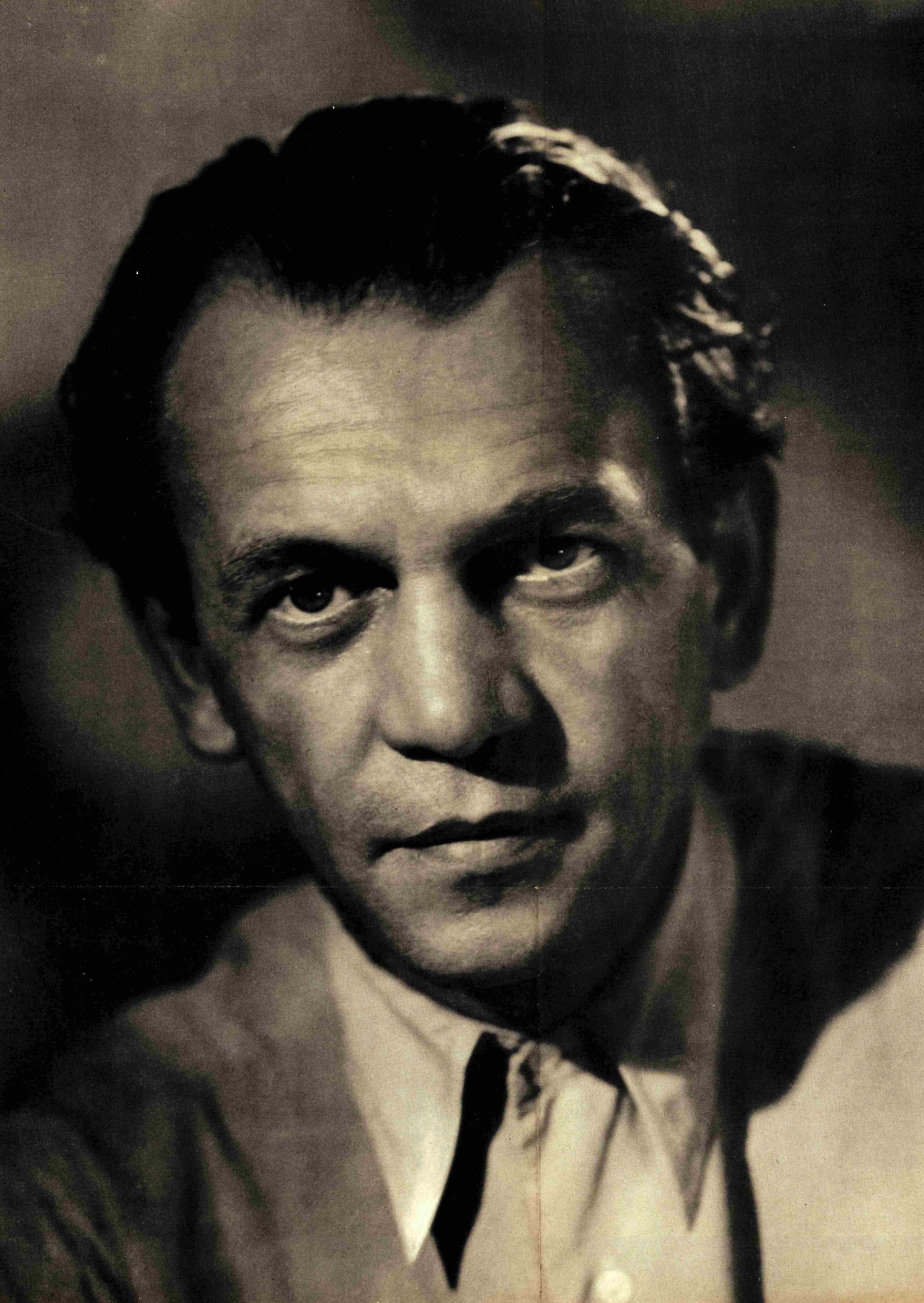

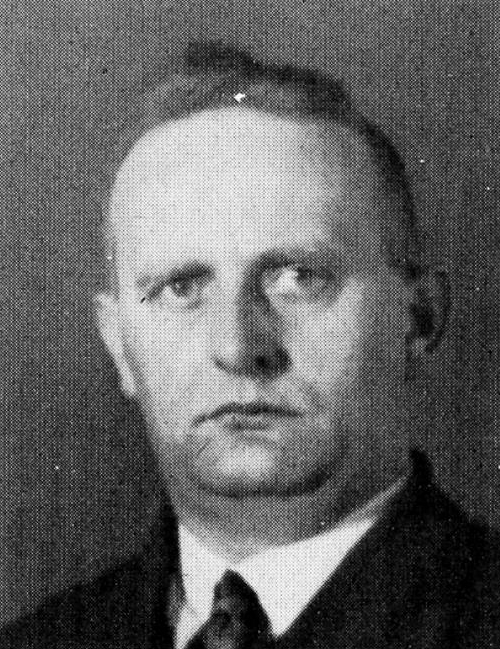
	First party	Second party
Candidate	Christian Stock	Werner Hilpert
Party	SPD	CDU
Last election	42 seats, 44.3%	35 seats, 37.3%
Seats won	38	28
Seat change	▼4	▼7
Popular vote	687,431	498,158
Percentage	42.7%	31.0%
Swing	▼1.5pp	▼6.3pp
	Third party	Fourth party
Candidate	August-Martin Euler	Oskar Müller
Party	LDP	KPD
Last election	6 seats, 8.1%	7 seats, 9.8%
Seats won	14	10
Seat change	▲8	▲3
Popular vote	252,207	171,592
Percentage	15.7%	10.7%
Swing	▲7.6pp	▲0.9pp
- Results of the election.
Government before election
Geiler cabinet
SPD–CDU–KPD–LDP
Government after election
Stock cabinet
SPD–CDU

The December 1946 Hessian state election was held on 1 December 1946 to elect the 1st Landtag of Hesse. The outgoing government was an all-party coalition led by Minister-President Karl Geiler.

Compared to the elections for the Constituent Assembly held at the end of June, both the Social Democratic Party (SPD) and Christian Democratic Union (CDU) declined, while the Liberal Democratic Party (LDP) particularly improved. The SPD remained the largest party with 43%, followed by the CDU on 31%, LDP on 16%, and Communist Party (KPD) on 11%. The SPD subsequently formed a grand coalition with the CDU, led by Minister-President Christian Stock.

== Electoral system ==
The Landtag was elected via party-list proportional representation. 62 members were elected in multi-member constituencies, and 28 then allocated using compensatory proportional representation. A single ballot was used for both. An electoral threshold of 5% of valid votes is applied to the Landtag; parties that fall below this threshold are ineligible to receive seats.

== Background ==
In the previous election held on 30 June 1946, the SPD emerged as the largest party with 44.3%, followed by the CDU on 37%, KPD on 10%, and LDP on 8%.

== Parties ==
The table below lists parties represented in the Constituent Assembly.

Name		Ideology	Lead candidate	June 1946 result	
Name		Ideology	Lead candidate	Votes (%)	Seats
SPD	Social Democratic Party of Germany; Sozialdemokratische Partei Deutschlands	Social democracy	Christian Stock	44.3%	44 / 90
CDU	Christian Democratic Union of Germany; Christlich Demokratische Union Deutschlands	Christian democracy	Werner Hilpert	37.3%	35 / 90
KPD	Communist Party of Germany; Kommunistische Partei Deutschlands	Communism	Oskar Müller	9.8%	9 / 90
LDP	Liberal Democratic Party; Liberal Demokratische Partei	Classical liberalism	August-Martin Euler	8.1%	6 / 90

== Results ==
Party	Votes	%	+/–	Seats			
Party	Votes	%	+/–	Con.	List	Total	+–
Social Democratic Party	687,431	42.71	–1.54	30	8	38	–4
Christian Democratic Union	498,158	30.95	–6.31	21	7	28	–7
Free Democratic Party	252,207	15.67	+7.58	8	6	14	+8
Communist Party	171,592	10.66	+0.87	3	7	10	+3
Total	1,609,388	100.00	–	62	28	90	0
Valid votes	1,609,388	92.42					
Invalid/blank votes	132,028	7.58					
Total votes	1,741,416	100.00					
Registered voters/turnout	2,380,109	73.17					
