= 1987 Hessian state election =

German state election

← 1983	5 April 1987	1991 →

All 110 seats in the Landtag of Hesse 56 seats needed for a majority
- Turnout: 3,346,992 (80.3% ▼3.2pp)
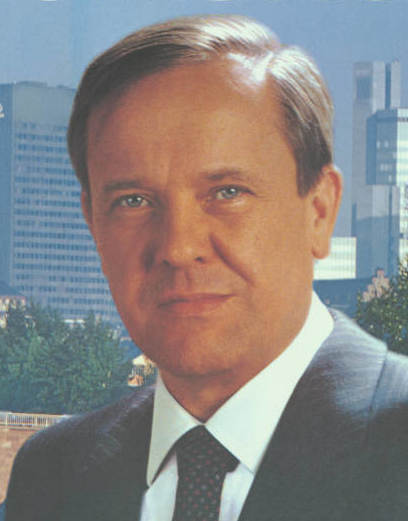

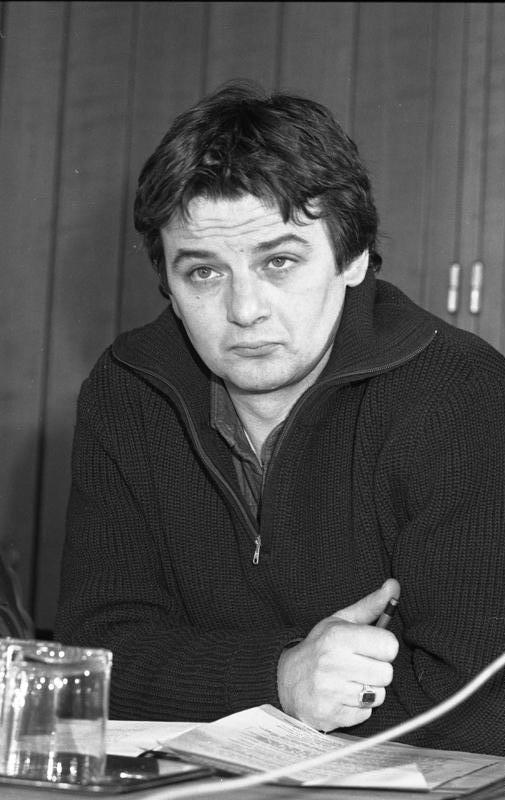

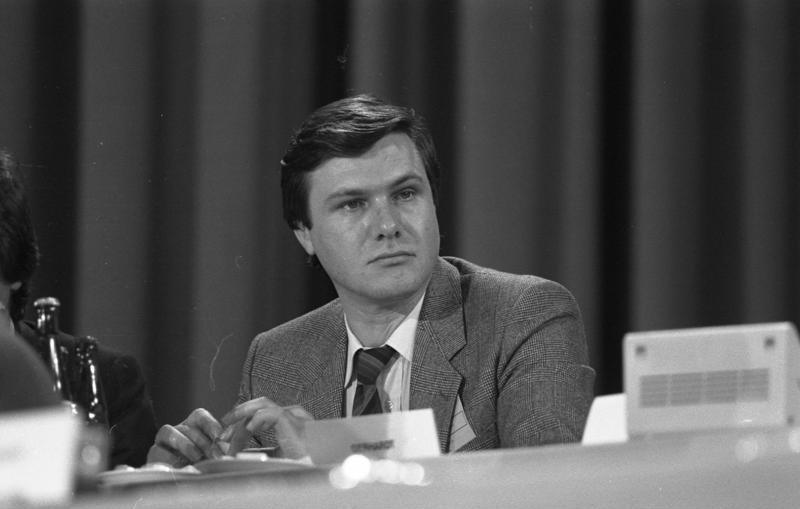
	First party	Second party
Candidate	Walter Wallmann	Hans Krollmann
Party	CDU	SPD
Last election	44 seats, 39.4%	51 seats, 46.2%
Seats won	47	44
Seat change	▲3	▼7
Popular vote	1,395,411	1,331,760
Percentage	42.1%	40.2%
Swing	▲2.7pp	▼6.0pp
	Third party	Fourth party
Candidate	Iris Blaul & Joschka Fischer	Wolfgang Gerhardt
Party	Greens	FDP
Last election	7 seats, 5.9%	8 seats, 7.6%
Seats won	10	9
Seat change	▲3	▲1
Popular vote	311,395	259,133
Percentage	9.4%	7.8%
Swing	▲3.5pp	▲0.2pp
- Results for the single-member constituencies.
Government before election
Third Börner cabinet
SPD–Green
Government after election
Wallmann cabinet
CDU–FDP

The 1987 Hessian state election was held on 5 April 1987 to elect the 12th Landtag of Hesse. The outgoing government was a coalition of the Social Democratic Party (SPD) and The Greens led by outgoing Minister-President Holger Börner, who retired at the election. The SPD campaign was led by finance minister Hans Krollmann, who ran to succeed him.

The government was defeated, with gains for the Greens offset by a significant swing against the SPD. The opposition Christian Democratic Union (CDU) became the largest party with 42% of votes and formed a coalition with the Free Democratic Party (FDP), ending 40 years of SPD rule in the state. CDU leader Walter Wallmann was elected Minister-President by the Landtag.

== Electoral system ==
The Landtag was elected via mixed-member proportional representation. 55 members were elected in single-member constituencies via first-past-the-post voting, and 55 then allocated using compensatory proportional representation. A single ballot was used for both. An electoral threshold of 5% of valid votes is applied to the Landtag; parties that fall below this threshold are ineligible to receive seats.

== Background ==
The previous election, held on 25 September 1983, was a snap election called after the Landtag elected in 1982 failed to form a government. The result was a strong victory for the SPD, who overtook the CDU as the largest party. The FDP also returned to the Landtag after losing their seats for the first time. The Greens, whose position as kingmaker caused the deadlock and fresh elections, retained their seats. Though the arithmetic was no better than in 1982, the SPD this time agreed to form a minority government with external support from the Greens. Holger Börner took office in June 1984. In October the following year, the SPD and Greens agreed to form a coalition government, marking the first involvement of the Greens in government in Germany. The coalition collapsed a little less than eighteen months later in February 1987 due to disputes over nuclear energy, leading to the election being called ahead of schedule in April.

== Parties ==
The table below lists parties represented in the 11th Landtag of Hesse.

Name		Ideology	Lead candidate	1983 result	
Name		Ideology	Lead candidate	Votes (%)	Seats
SPD	Social Democratic Party of Germany; Sozialdemokratische Partei Deutschlands	Social democracy	Hans Krollmann	46.2%	51 / 110
CDU	Christian Democratic Union of Germany; Christlich Demokratische Union Deutschlands	Christian democracy	Walter Wallmann	39.4%	44 / 110
FDP	Free Democratic Party; Freie Demokratische Partei	Classical liberalism	Wolfgang Gerhardt	7.6%	8 / 110
GRÜNE	The Greens; Die Grünen	Green politics	Iris Blaul & Joschka Fischer	5.9%	7 / 110

== Election result ==
Party	Votes	%	Swing	Seats			
Party	Votes	%	Swing	Con.	List	Total	+/-
Christian Democratic Union (CDU)	1,395,441	42.12	▲2.72	29	18	47	▲3
Social Democratic Party (SPD)	1,331,760	40.20	▼6.03	26	18	44	▼7
The Greens (GRÜNE)	311,395	9.40	▲3.46	0	10	10	▲3
Free Democratic Party (FDP)	259,133	7.82	▲0.21	0	9	9	▲1
German Communist Party (DKP)	9,168	0.28	▲0.02	0	0	0	0
Ecological Democratic Party (ÖDP)	4,627	0.14	New	0	0	0	New
Feminist Party of Germany (FRAUEN)	1,004	0.03	New	0	0	0	New
UngüLtiG	244	0.01	New	0	0	0	New
The Colourful (BUNTE)	190	0.01	New	0	0	0	New
The Responsible Citizens	129	0.00	New	0	0	0	New
Eco	123	0.00	New	0	0	0	New
Total	3,313,184	100.00		55	55	110	0
Invalid	33,808	1.01					
Turnout	3,346,992	80.30	▼3.23				
Registered voters	4,167,871						
