= 1950 Hessian state election =

German state election

- 19 November 1950

All 80 seats in the Landtag of Hesse 41 seats needed for a majority
- Turnout: 1,936,762 (64.9% ▼8.3pp)
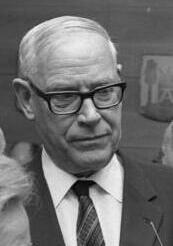

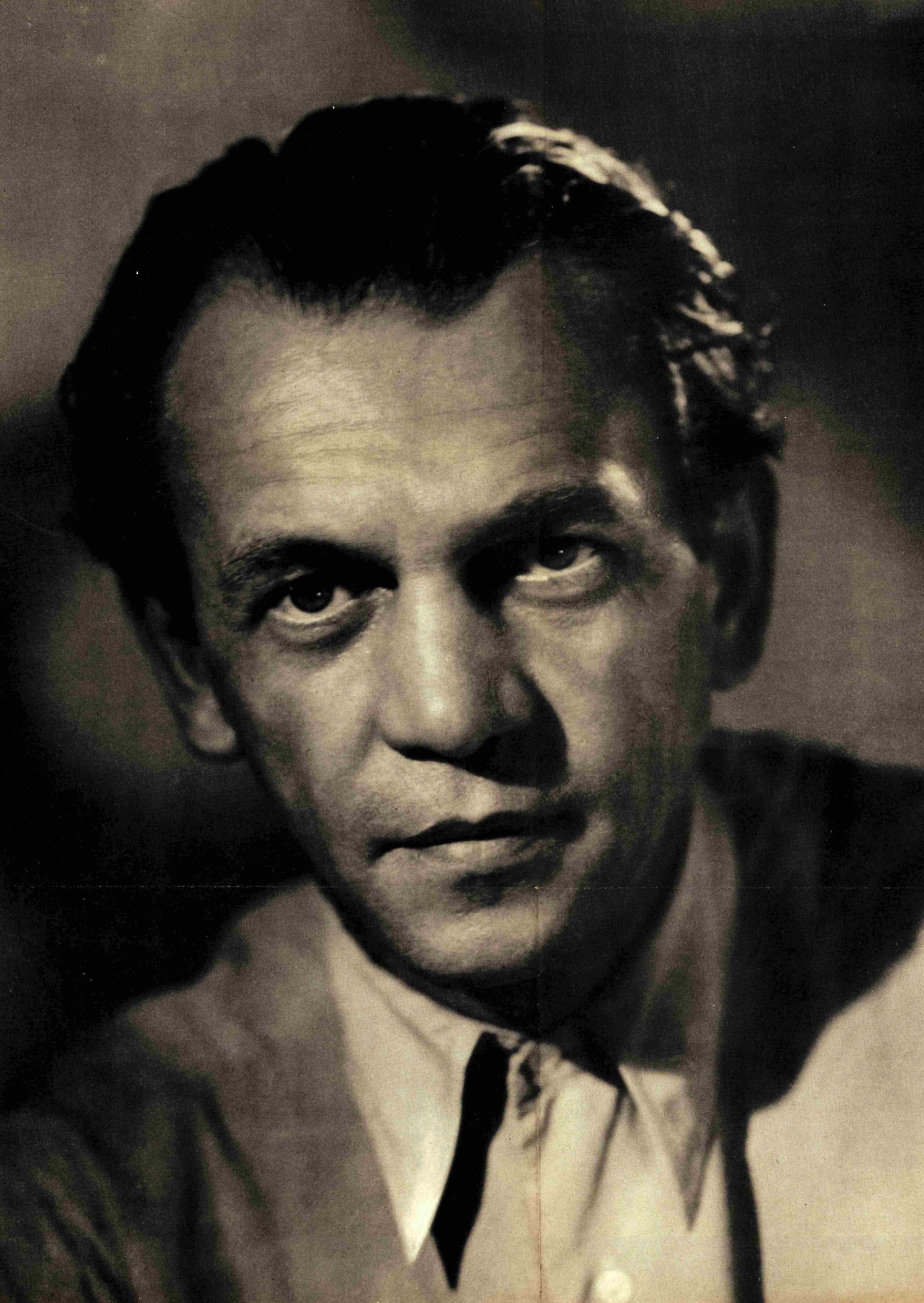

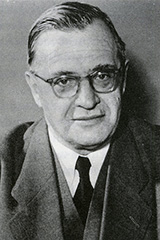
| | First party | Second party |
|---|---|---|
| Candidate | Georg-August Zinn | August-Martin Euler |
| Party | SPD | FDP–GB/BHE |
| Last election | 38 seats, 42.7% | 14 seats, 15.7% (Note: Results for the LDP.) |
| Seats won | 47 | 21 |
| Seat change | ▲9 | ▲7 |
| Popular vote | 821,268 | 588,739 |
| Percentage | 44.4% | 31.8% |
| Swing | ▲1.7pp | ▲16.1pp |
| | Third party | Fourth party |
| Candidate | Werner Hilpert |
| Party | CDU | KPD |
| Last election | 28 seats, 31.0% | 10 seats, 10.7% |
| Seats won | 12 | 0 |
| Seat change | ▼16 | ▼10 |
| Popular vote | 348,148 | 87,878 |
| Percentage | 18.8% | 4.7% |
| Swing | ▼12.1pp | ▼5.9pp |
- Results for the single-member constituencies.
Government before election
Stock cabinet
SPD–CDU
Government after election
First Zinn cabinet
SPD

The 1950 Hessian state election was held on 19 November 1950 to elect the 2nd Landtag of Hesse. The outgoing government was a grand coalition of the Social Democratic Party (SPD) and Christian Democratic Union (CDU) led by Minister-President Christian Stock, who retired at the election. He was succeeded as SPD lead candidate by Georg-August Zinn.

The SPD won a clear majority of seats thanks to quirks of the electoral system, which had been modified since 1946 to a form of mixed-member proportional representation. The Hessian CDU, who took a left-of-centre course in government with the SPD, were heavily defeated and pushed to third place with 19%. An alliance of the Free Democratic Party (FDP) and All-German Bloc/League of Expellees (GB/HBE) emerged as the second-largest party with 32%, but were unable to prevent the SPD from achieving its majority. Further, the Communist Party (KPD) slipped just below the 5% electoral threshold and lost their seats. After the election, Minister-President Stock retired and was succeeded by justice minister Georg-August Zinn, who led an SPD majority government.

== Electoral system ==
The Landtag was elected via mixed-member proportional representation. 48 members were elected in single-member constituencies via first-past-the-post voting, and 32 then allocated using compensatory proportional representation. A single ballot was used for both. An electoral threshold of 5% of valid votes is applied to the Landtag; parties that fall below this threshold are ineligible to receive seats.

== Background ==
In the previous election held on 1 December 1946, the SPD remained the largest party with 43%, followed by the CDU on 31%, FDP on 16%, and KPD on 11%. The SPD subsequently formed a grand coalition with the CDU.

== Parties ==
The table below lists parties represented in the 1st Landtag of Hesse.

| Name | | Ideology | Lead candidate | 1946 result | |
| Name | | Ideology | Lead candidate | Votes (%) | Seats |
|---|---|---|---|---|---|
| SPD | Social Democratic Party of Germany; Sozialdemokratische Partei Deutschlands | Social democracy | Georg-August Zinn | 42.7% | 38 / 90 |
| CDU | Christian Democratic Union of Germany; Christlich Demokratische Union Deutschlands | Christian democracy | Werner Hilpert | 31.0% | 28 / 90 |
| FDP | Free Democratic Party; Freie Demokratische Partei | Classical liberalism | August-Martin Euler | 15.7% | 14 / 90 |
| KPD | Communist Party of Germany; Kommunistische Partei Deutschlands | Communism | | 10.7% | 10 / 90 |

== Results ==
| Party | Votes | % | +/– | Seats | | | |
| Party | Votes | % | +/– | Con. | List | Total | +– |
|---|---|---|---|---|---|---|---|
| Social Democratic Party | 821,268 | 44.37 | +1.65 | 36 | 11 | 47 | +9 |
| Free Democratic Party–All-German Bloc/League of Expellees | 588,739 | 31.81 | +16.13 | 8 | 13 | 21 | +7 |
| Christian Democratic Union | 348,148 | 18.81 | –12.15 | 4 | 8 | 12 | –16 |
| Communist Party | 87,878 | 4.75 | –5.91 | 0 | 0 | 0 | –10 |
| National Democratic Party–German Reich Party | 1,989 | 0.11 | New | 0 | 0 | 0 | New |
| Hessian Farmers' and Peasants' Party | 1,219 | 0.07 | New | 0 | 0 | 0 | New |
| Bloc of Fatherland Unification | 765 | 0.04 | New | 0 | 0 | 0 | New |
| Independents | 1,081 | 0.06 | +0.06 | 0 | – | 0 | 0 |
| Total | 1,851,087 | 100.00 | – | 48 | 32 | 80 | –10 |
| Valid votes | 1,851,087 | 95.58 | | | | | |
| Invalid/blank votes | 85,675 | 4.42 | | | | | |
| Total votes | 1,936,762 | 100.00 | | | | | |
| Registered voters/turnout | 2,985,021 | 64.88 | | | | | |
