= 1974 Hessian state election =

German state election

← 1970	27 October 1974	1978 →

All 110 seats in the Landtag of Hesse 56 seats needed for a majority
- Turnout: 3,264,209 (84.8% ▲2.0pp)
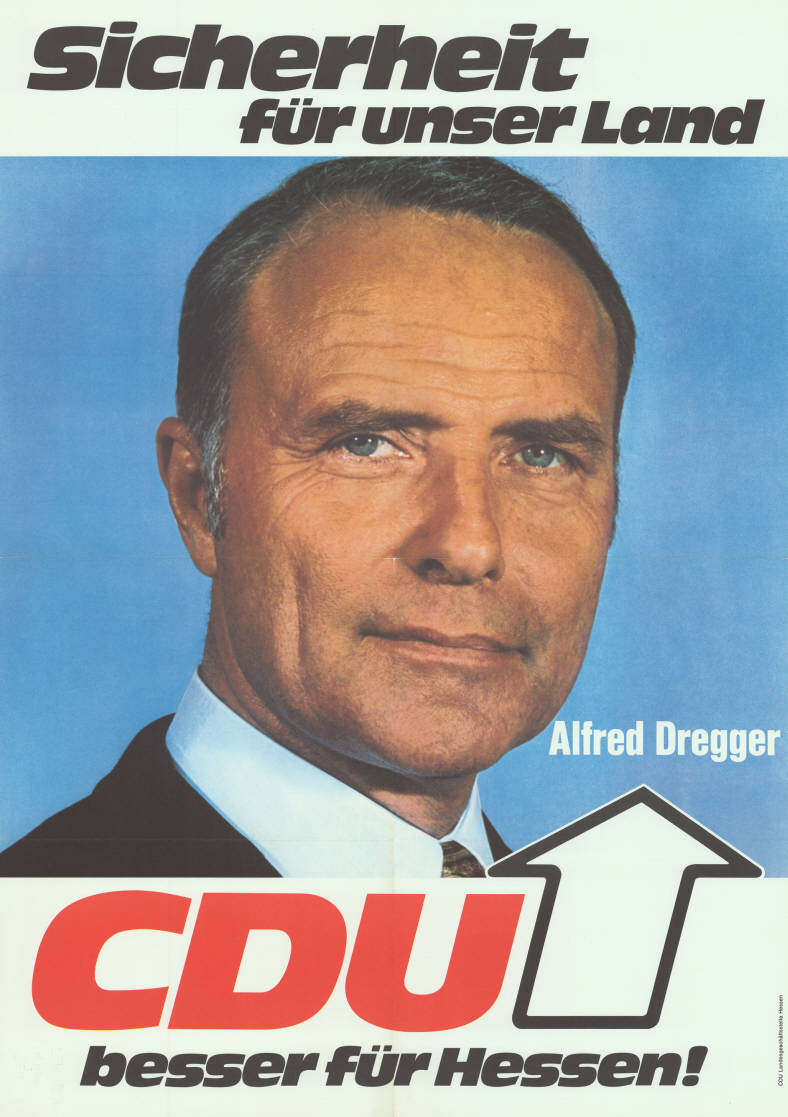

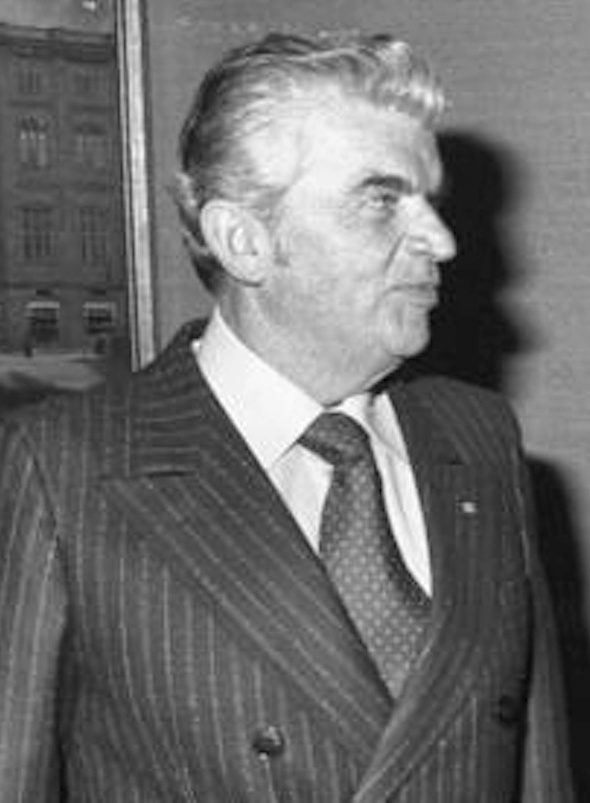

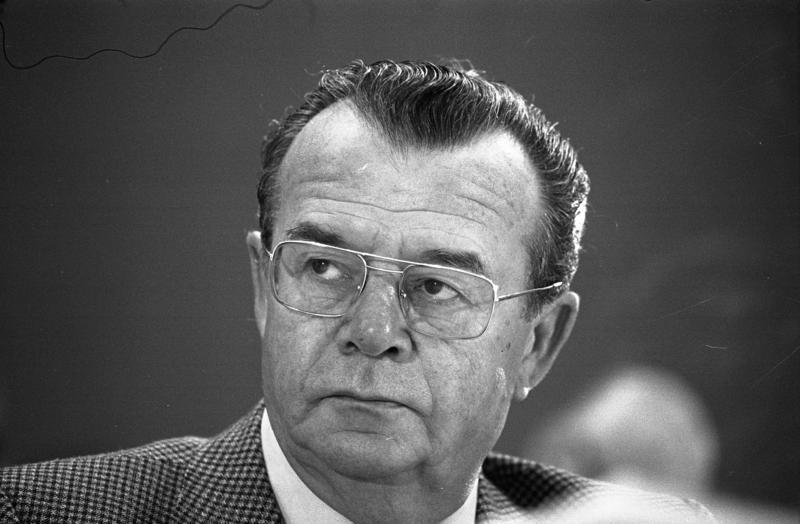
	First party	Second party	Third party
Candidate	Alfred Dregger	Albert Osswald	Heinz-Herbert Karry
Party	CDU	SPD	FDP
Last election	46 seats, 39.7%	53 seats, 45.9%	11 seats, 10.1%
Seats won	53	49	8
Seat change	▲7	▼4	▼3
Popular vote	1,528,793	1,394,123	238,726
Percentage	47.3%	43.2%	7.4%
Swing	▲7.6pp	▼2.7pp	▼2.7pp
- Results for the single-member constituencies.
Government before election
Second Osswald cabinet
SPD–FDP
Government after election
Third Osswald cabinet
SPD–FDP

The 1974 Hessian state election was held on 27 October 1974 to elect the 8th Landtag of Hesse. The outgoing government was a coalition of the Social Democratic Party (SPD) and Free Democratic Party (FDP) led by Minister-President Albert Osswald.

The opposition Christian Democratic Union (CDU) achieved a significant victory by becoming the largest party in Hesse for the first time. The state had long been considered a stronghold of the SPD. Despite this, the SPD and FDP retained a narrow majority between them and renewed their coalition for a second term.

== Electoral system ==
The Landtag was elected via mixed-member proportional representation. 55 members were elected in single-member constituencies via first-past-the-post voting, and 55 then allocated using compensatory proportional representation. A single ballot was used for both. An electoral threshold of 5% of valid votes is applied to the Landtag; parties that fall below this threshold are ineligible to receive seats.

== Background ==
In the previous election held on 8 November 1970, the CDU achieved a major swing and increased its vote share to just under 40%, offering a serious challenge to the SPD for the first time in decades. Though remaining the largest party with 46%, the SPD were deprived of their majority and formed a coalition government with the FDP.

== Parties ==
The table below lists parties represented in the 7th Landtag of Hesse.

Name		Ideology	Lead candidate	1970 result	
Name		Ideology	Lead candidate	Votes (%)	Seats
SPD	Social Democratic Party of Germany; Sozialdemokratische Partei Deutschlands	Social democracy	Albert Osswald	45.9%	53 / 110
CDU	Christian Democratic Union of Germany; Christlich Demokratische Union Deutschlands	Christian democracy	Alfred Dregger	39.7%	46 / 110
FDP	Free Democratic Party; Freie Demokratische Partei	Classical liberalism	Heinz Herbert Karry	10.1%	11 / 110

== Results ==
Party	Votes	%	+/–	Seats			
Party	Votes	%	+/–	Con.	List	Total	+–
Christian Democratic Union	1,528,793	47.32	+7.59	35	18	53	+7
Social Democratic Party	1,394,123	43.16	–2.75	20	29	49	–4
Free Democratic Party	238,726	7.39	–2.68	0	8	8	–3
National Democratic Party	32,713	1.01	–2.00	0	0	0	0
German Communist Party	28,699	0.89	–0.28	0	0	0	0
Communist Party of Germany (AO)	4,168	0.13	New	0	0	0	New
Communist League of West Germany	2,732	0.08	New	0	0	0	New
League of German Communists	352	0.01	New	0	0	0	New
European Labour Committees	23	0.00	New	0	0	0	New
Independents	91	0.00	0.00	0	–	0	0
Total	3,230,420	100.00	–	55	55	110	0
Valid votes	3,230,420	98.96					
Invalid/blank votes	33,789	1.04					
Total votes	3,264,209	100.00					
Registered voters/turnout	3,850,223	84.78					
