= Ruth Wagner =

German politician (1940–2025)

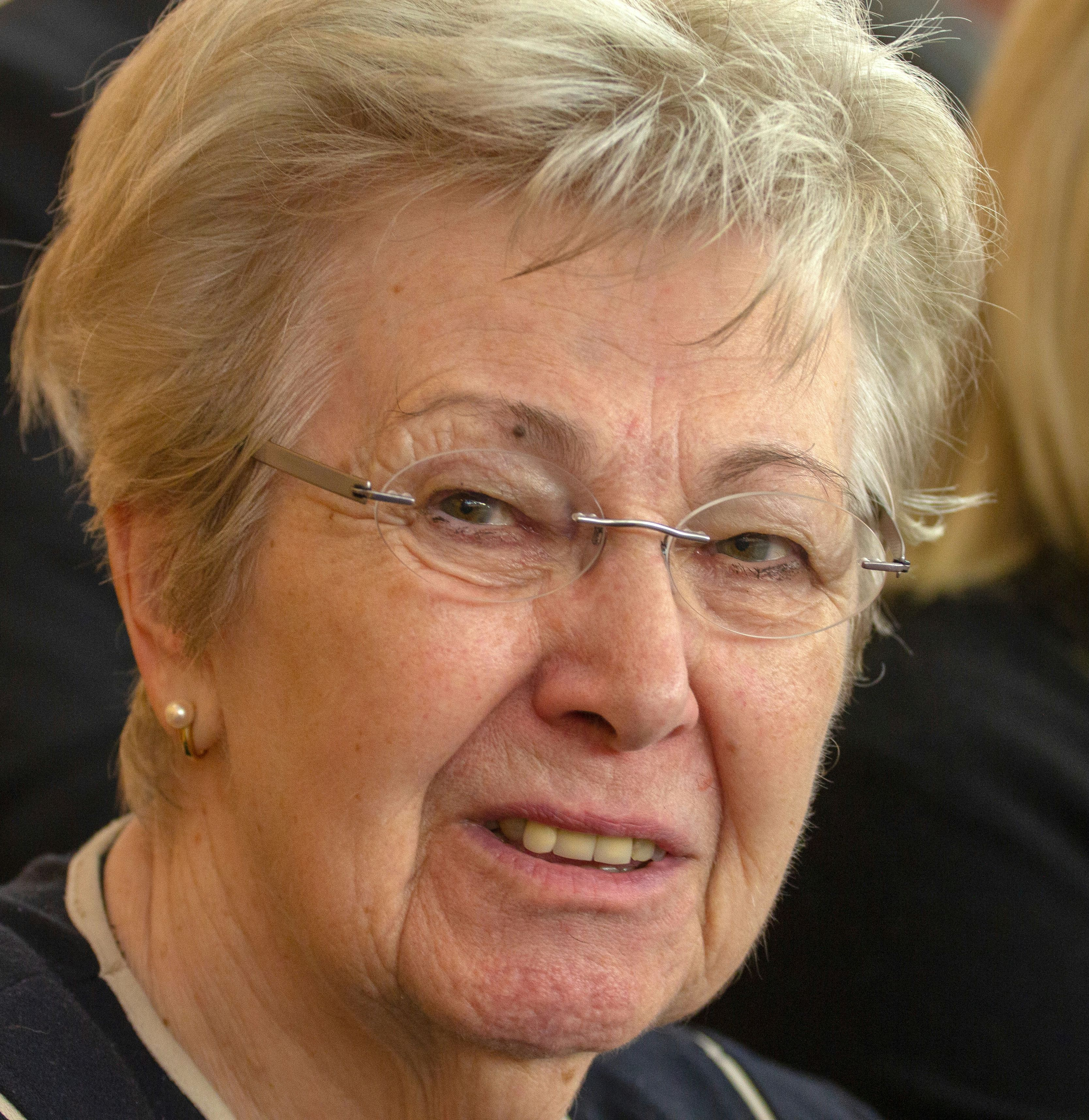
- Wagner in 2019
- Born: 19 October 1940; Riedstadt, Germany
- Died: 28 December 2025 (aged 85); Darmstadt, Hesse, Germany
- Education: Frankfurt University
- Occupations: Politician; Pedagogue
- Organizations: Landtag of Hesse; Hessian Ministry of Higher Education, Research and the Arts; Rheingau Musik Festival
- Political party: FDP

Ruth Wagner (18 October 1940 – 28 December 2025) was a German politician for the Free Democratic Party (FDP). She was a member of the Landtag of Hesse from 1978 to 1999, serving as vice president of the state parliament twice. She was Hessian minister of culture from 1999 to 2003, promoting education, especially independent universities, and the arts. She also worked as city counselor of Darmstadt and on the board of the federal FDP. Wagner held leading positions in several cultural institutions, a co-founder of the Rheingau Musik Festival, president of art associations and a commission for the history of the Jews in Hesse. She was nicknamed Mother Courage of Hesse.

== Life and career ==
Wagner was born on 18 October 1940 in Riedstadt. Her father died as a soldier in World War II, and her mother worked as a seamstress. Her mother convinced her to go for higher education, as the first girl from her village. She completed school with the Abitur at the Gymnasium Gernsheim in 1960. She studied German, history and political science at the Frankfurt University in order to become a teacher.

=== Teaching ===
Wagner taught at the Viktoriaschule in Darmstadt from 1968 to 1976. She served as deputy president of the Hessischer Philologenverband and Deutscher Lehrerverband Hessen from 1969 to 1975. She worked for the Hessian Institut für Bildungsplanung und Schulentwicklung on planning of school development from 1976 to 1978. She was a founding member of the Deutscher Bibliotheksverband in Hesse in 1980.

=== Politics ===
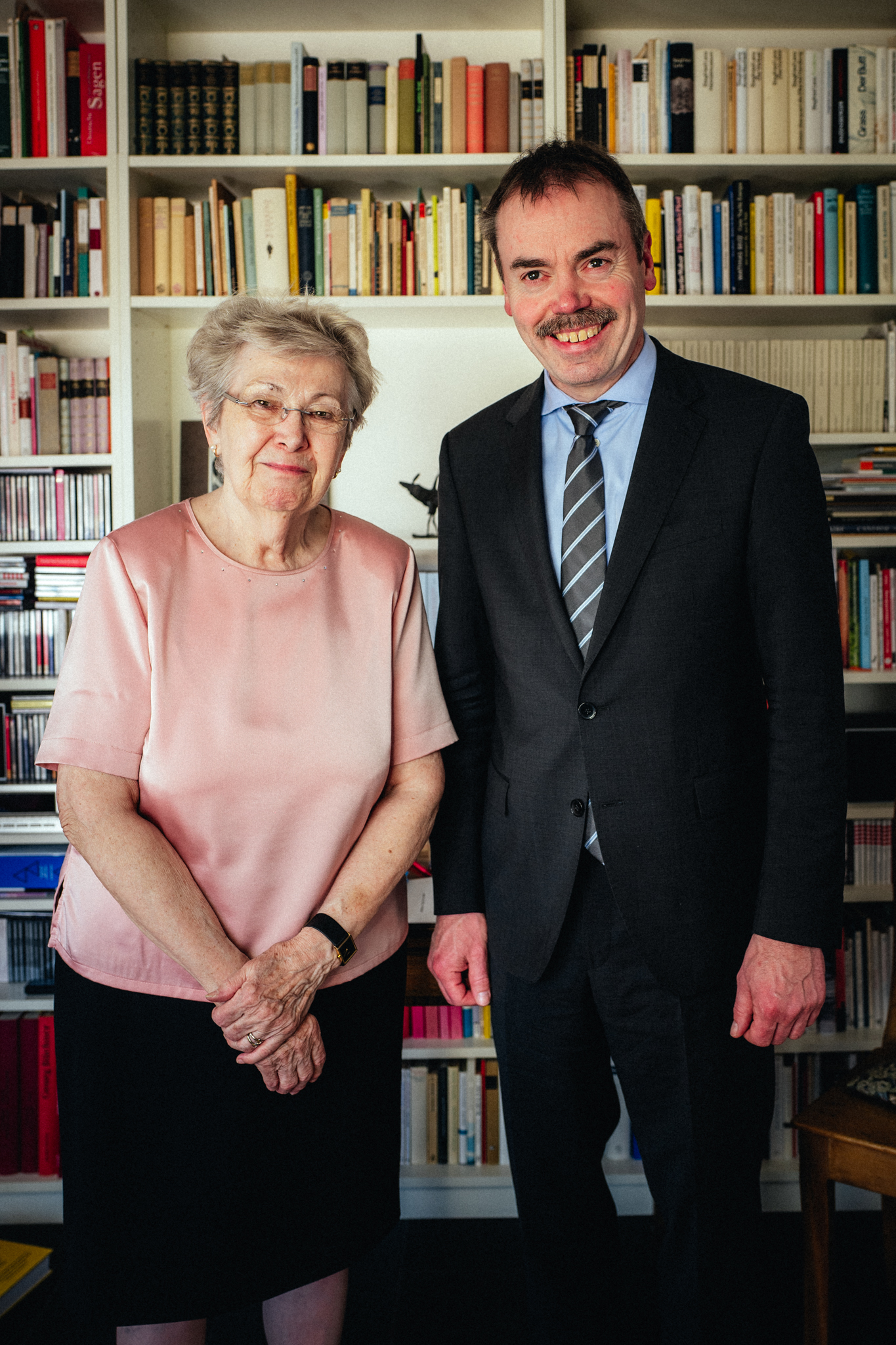
Wagner in 2020

Wagner entered the FDP in 1971. In 1977 she became both president of the Darmstadt section of the FDP, serving to 1990, and a member of the board of the FDP in Hesse. She held the position of a city counselor in Darmstadt from 1977 to 1980, 1989 to 1995 and since 2006.

In 1978 Wagner was elected to the Landtag of Hesse, the parliament of the state of Hesse, serving until 1999. When she became a member, her party was in a ruling coalition with the SPD, led by minister-president Holger Börner, followed by years when they were an opposition party. In 1987, the FDP headed by Wolfgang Gerhardt, returned to ruling, now with the CDU. She worked as vice president of its commission for public office matters from 1989 to 1991, and was the Landtag's vice president from 1987 to 1991 and again from 2003 to 2008. She was from 1987 vice president of the FDP in Hesse, and from 1987 to 1995 to 2005 its president. She was a member of the board of the federal FDP from 1988 to 2008.

In 1999, Wagner was instrumental in the election of Roland Koch as minister-president in Hesse. She became minister of Higher Education, Research and the Arts, her choice of ministry. She also served as vice president of the minister-president during the period.

She was instrumental in making the Technische Universität Darmstadt the first independent university, and focused on the autonomy of universities. In 2003, when the CDU won an absolute majority in parliament, she resigned from the post.

=== Public offices ===
Wagner was a founding member of the Rheingau Musik Festival. She was president of a commission for the history of the Jews in Hesse from 2005 to 2011. She encouraged the Tag des offenen Denkmals in Hesse. She was president of the Kulturfonds RheinMain until 2017, and president of the Kunstverein Darmstadt until 2020.

=== Personal life ===
Wagner, who lived in Darmstadt for most of her life, was an avid amateur painter.

She died in Darmstadt on 28 December 2025, at the age of 85. She was nicknamed Mother Courage of Hesse, for her firm stance in discussions.

== Awards ==
Wagner was honoured with the Commander's Cross of the Order of Merit of the Federal Republic of Germany. The minister-president of Hesse, Volker Bouffier, awarded her the Wilhelm Leuschner Medal of the State of Hesse for merits related to German re-unification on 5 November 2010.
