= 2003 Hessian state election =

State election in Hesse, Germany

2003 Hesse state election
- 2 February 2003

All 110 seats of the Landtag of Hesse 56 seats needed for a majority
- Turnout: 2,734,992 (64.6%) ▼1.8%
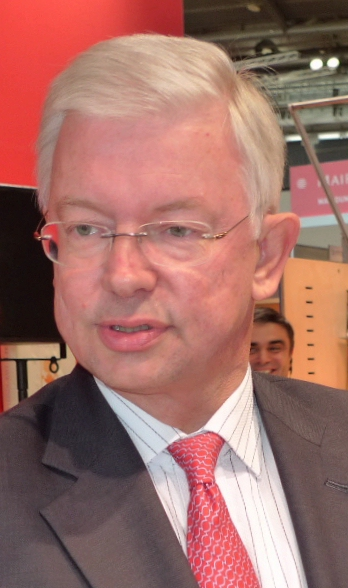

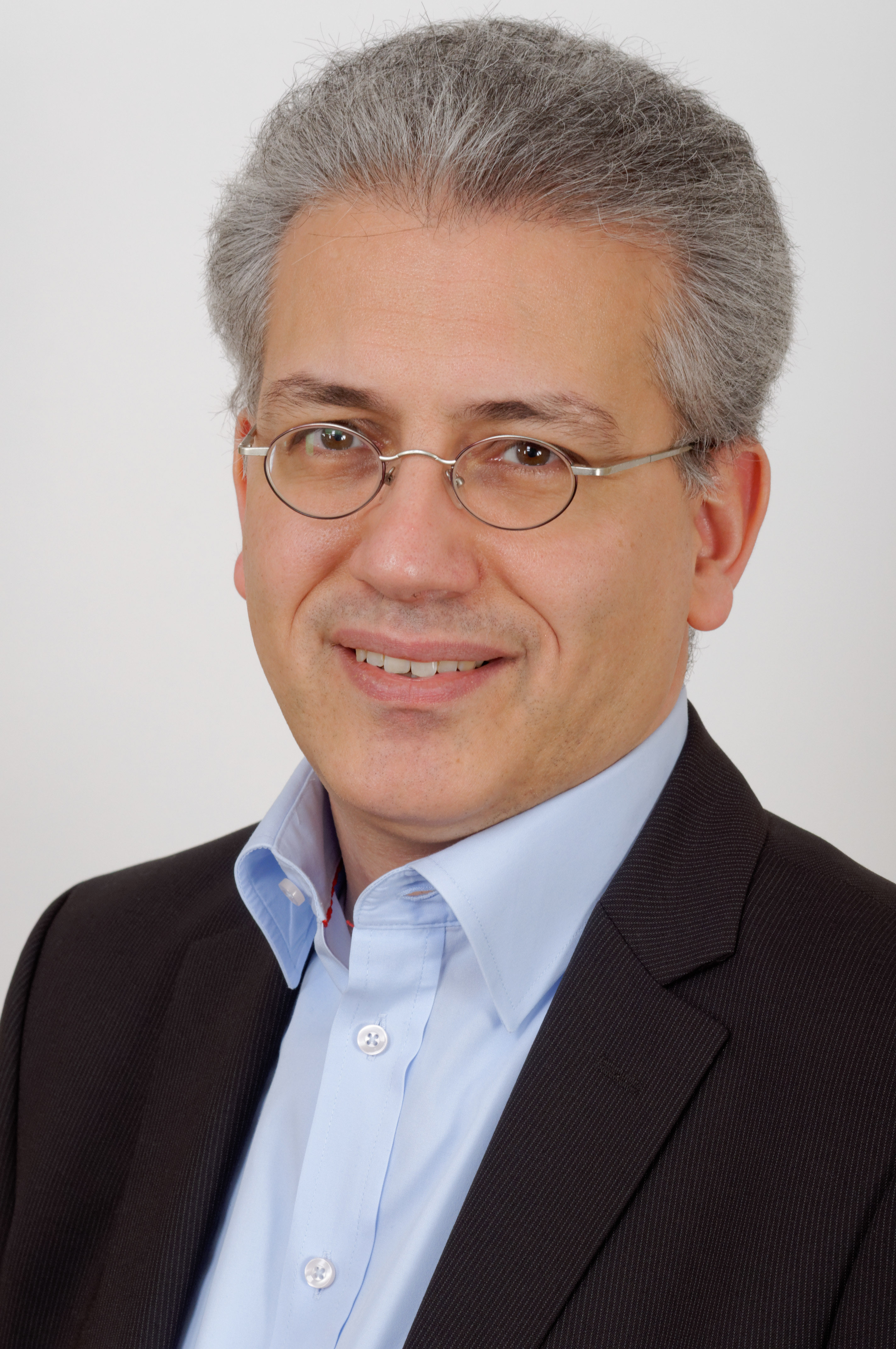

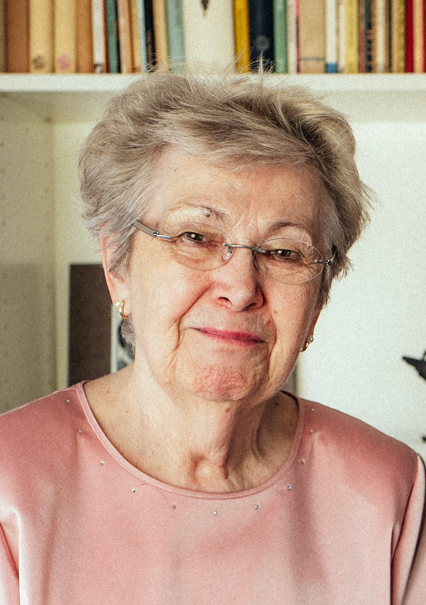
	First party	Second party
Leader	Roland Koch	Gerhard Bökel
Party	CDU	SPD
Last election	50 seats, 43.4%	46 seats, 39.4%
Seats won	56	33
Seat change	▲6	▼13
Popular vote	1,333,863	795,576
Percentage	48.8%	29.1%
Swing	▲5.4%	▼10.3%
	Third party	Fourth party
Leader	Evelin Schönhut-Keil; Tarek Al-Wazir	Ruth Wagner
Party	Greens	FDP
Last election	8 seats, 7.2%	6 seats, 5.1%
Seats won	12	9
Seat change	▲4	▲3
Popular vote	276,276	216,110
Percentage	10.1%	7.9%
Swing	▲2.9%	▲2.8%
- Results for the single-member constituencies.
Minister-President before election
Roland Koch
CDU
Elected Minister-President
Roland Koch
CDU

The 2003 Hessian state election was held on 2 February 2003 to elect the members of the Landtag of Hesse. The incumbent coalition government of the Christian Democratic Union (CDU) and Free Democratic Party (FDP) led by Minister-President Roland Koch was returned with an increased majority. The CDU recorded a 5.4% swing in its favour, winning an absolute majority of seats. It subsequently formed government alone, with Roland Koch continuing in office.

== Parties ==
The table below lists parties represented in the previous Landtag of Hesse.

Name		Ideology	Leader(s)	1999 result	
Name		Ideology	Leader(s)	Votes (%)	Seats
CDU	Christian Democratic Union of Germany; Christlich Demokratische Union Deutschlands	Christian democracy	Roland Koch	43.4%	50 / 110
SPD	Social Democratic Party of Germany; Sozialdemokratische Partei Deutschlands	Social democracy	Gerhard Bökel	39.4%	46 / 110
Grüne	Alliance 90/The Greens; Bündnis 90/Die Grünen	Green politics	Evelin Schönhut-Keil; Tarek Al-Wazir	7.2%	8 / 110
FDP	Free Democratic Party; Freie Demokratische Partei	Classical liberalism	Ruth Wagner	5.1%	6 / 110

== Opinion polling ==
Polling firm	Fieldwork date	Sample size	CDU	SPD	Grüne	FDP	Others	Lead
2003 state election	2 February 2003	–	48.8	29.1	10.1	7.9	4.1	19.7
Forsa	31 Jan 2003	?	49	29	11	8	3	20
Forsa	20–24 Jan 2003	1,012	51	29	10	7	3	22
Forsa	13–18 Jan 2003	1,078	50	31	10	5	4	19
Infratest dimap	16–19 Jan 2003	1,000	48	31	11	7	3	17
Forschungsgruppe Wahlen	13–16 Jan 2003	1,036	48	32	10	7	3	16
Forsa	6–10 Jan 2003	1,003	48	33	10	5	4	15
Infratest dimap	2–7 Jan 2003	1,000	47	33	10	5	5	14
Forsa	27 Dec–3 Jan 2003	1,120	47	32	12	5	4	15
Infratest dimap	2–4 Dec 2002	1,000	49	32	11	5	3	17
dimap	13 May 2002	?	45	35	6	9	5	10
Forsa	18 Jan 2001	?	40	39	8	7	6	1
Infratest dimap	28–31 Jan 2000	1,000	35	44	9	7	5	9
Ipos	19–21 Jan 2000	1,004	33	46	11	5	5	13
1999 state election	7 February 1999	–	43.4	39.4	7.2	5.1	4.9	4.0

== Election result ==
Summary of the 2 February 2003 election results for the Landtag of Hesse
Party	Constituency			Party list				Total seats	+/-
Party	Votes	%	Seats	Votes	%	+/-	Seats	Total seats	+/-
Christian Democratic Union	1,411,800	51.99	53	1,333,863	48.77	+5.36	3	56	▲6
Social Democratic Party	898,813	33.10	2	795,576	29.09	-10.28	31	33	▼13
Alliance 90/The Greens	230,261	8.48	0	276,276	10.10	+2.92	12	12	▲4
Free Democratic Party	148,632	5.47	0	216,110	7.90	+2.80	9	9	▲3
The Republicans	7,025	0.26	0	34,563	1.26	-1.42	0	0	0
Human Environment Animal Protection Party	4,815	0.18	0	20,600	0.75	+0.29	0	0	0
Airport Expansion Opponents	–			17,736	0.65	New	0	0	New
Party for a Rule of Law Offensive	3,074	0.11	0	14,545	0.53	New	0	0	New
Feminist Party of Germany	1,090	0.04	0	7,506	0.27	+0.04	0	0	0
Party of Bible-abiding Christians	1,465	0.05	0	6,674	0.24	+0.07	0	0	0
German Communist Party	2,552	0.09	0	5,908	0.22	+0.08	0	0	0
Ecological Democratic Party	378	0.01	0	2,683	0.10	+0.02	0	0	0
Civil Rights Movement Soliarity	873	0.03	0	1,643	0.06	+0.04	0	0	0
Socialist Equality Party	–			1,309	0.05	New	0	0	New
Independents	4,555	0.17	0	–				0	0
Socialist Alternative	356	0.01	0	–				0	New
Total	2,715,689	100.00	55	2,734,992	100.00		55	110	0
Invalid	82,845	2.96		63,542	2.27				
Turnout	2,798,534	64.62		2,798,534	64.62	-1.83			
Registered voters	4,330,792			4,330,792					

== Sources ==
- The Federal Returning Officer
