= 1958 Hessian state election =

German state election

- 23 November 1958

All 96 seats in the Landtag of Hesse 49 seats needed for a majority
- Turnout: 2,680,548 (82.3% ▼0.1pp)
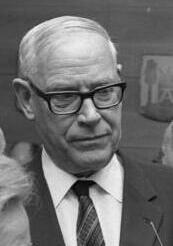

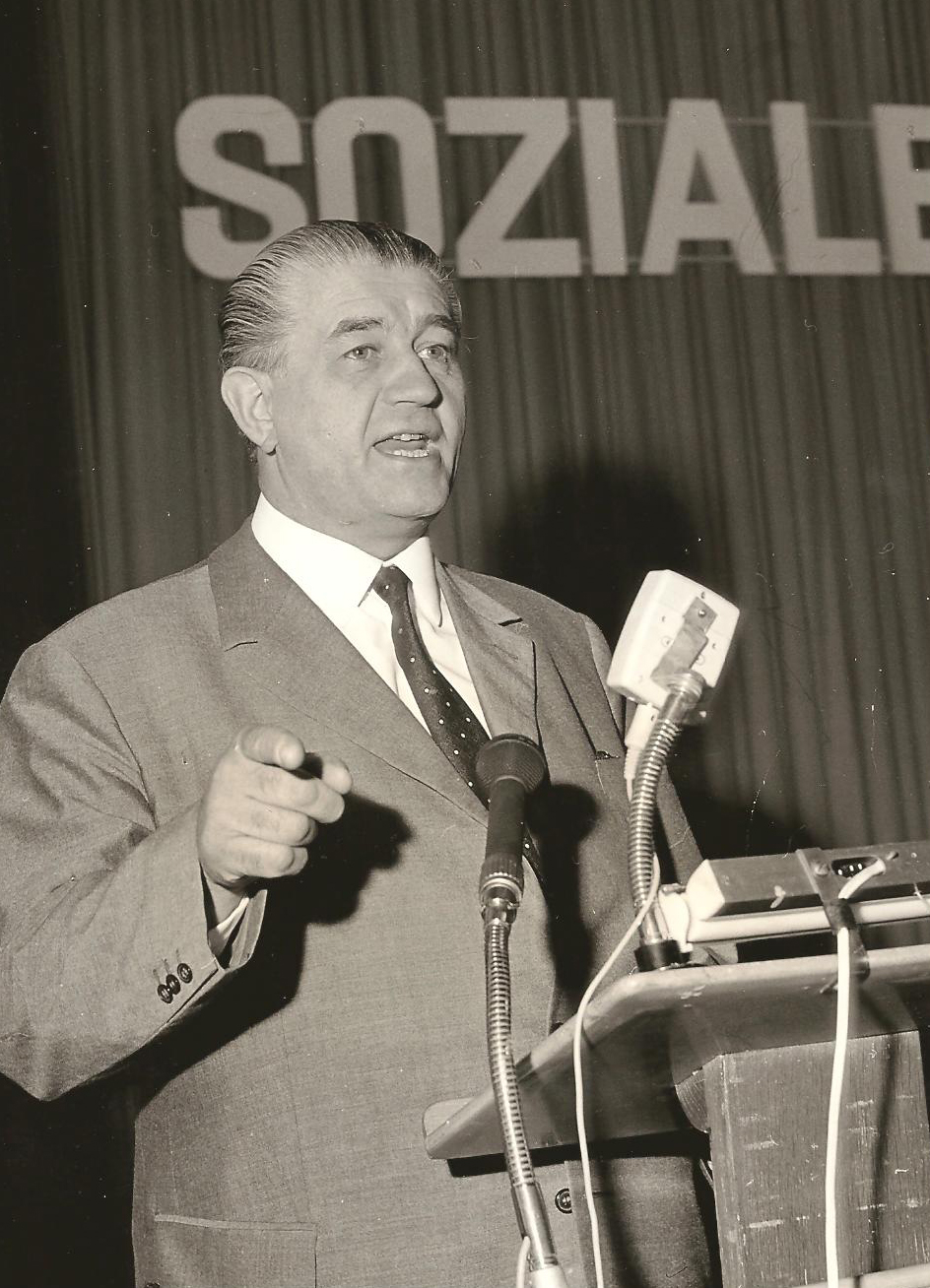
	First party	Second party
Candidate	Georg-August Zinn	Wilhelm Fay
Party	SPD	CDU
Last election	44 seats, 42.6%	24 seats, 24.1%
Seats won	48	32
Seat change	▲4	▲8
Popular vote	1,235,361	843,041
Percentage	46.9%	32.0%
Swing	▲4.3pp	▲7.9pp
	Third party	Fourth party
Candidate	Wolfram Dörinkel	Gotthard Franke
Party	FDP	GB/BHE
Last election	21 seats, 20.5%	7 seats, 7.7%
Seats won	9	7
Seat change	▼12	0
Popular vote	250,310	193,996
Percentage	9.5%	7.4%
Swing	▼11.0pp	▼0.3pp
- Results for the single-member constituencies.
Government before election
Second Zinn cabinet
SPD–GB/BHE
Government after election
Third Zinn cabinet
SPD–GB/BHE

The 1958 Hessian state election was held on 23 November 1958 to elect the 4th Landtag of Hesse. The outgoing government was a coalition of the Social Democratic Party (SPD) and All-German Bloc/League of Expellees (GB/BHE) led by Minister-President Georg-August Zinn.

The election saw major losses for the Free Democratic Party (FDP) matched by gains for the SPD and Christian Democratic Union (CDU), which established itself as the major opposition to the SPD-led government. The FDP finished on 10%, its worst result since the inaugural postwar elections in 1946. The SPD's coalition partner the GB/BHE remained steady on 7%, and the government was renewed for a second term.

== Electoral system ==
The Landtag was elected via mixed-member proportional representation. 48 members were elected in single-member constituencies via first-past-the-post voting, and 48 then allocated using compensatory proportional representation. A single ballot was used for both. An electoral threshold of 5% of valid votes is applied to the Landtag; parties that fall below this threshold are ineligible to receive seats.

== Background ==
In the previous election held on 28 November 1954, the SPD suffered small losses and fell to 43%, but remained clearly the largest party. The CDU emerged as the second largest party by a small margin as the FDP fell to 20%. The GB/BHE ran independently and won 8%, subsequently forming a coalition with the SPD.

== Parties ==
The table below lists parties represented in the 3rd Landtag of Hesse.

Name		Ideology	Lead candidate	1954 result	
Name		Ideology	Lead candidate	Votes (%)	Seats
SPD	Social Democratic Party of Germany; Sozialdemokratische Partei Deutschlands	Social democracy	Georg-August Zinn	42.6%	44 / 96
CDU	Christian Democratic Union of Germany; Christlich Demokratische Union Deutschlands	Christian democracy	Wilhelm Fay	24.1%	24 / 96
FDP	Free Democratic Party; Freie Demokratische Partei	Classical liberalism	Heinrich Kohl	20.5%	21 / 96
GB/BHE	All-German Bloc/League of Expellees and Deprived of Rights; Gesamtdeutscher Block/Bund der Heimatvertriebenen und Entrechteten	National conservatism	Gotthard Franke	7.7%	7 / 96

== Results ==
Party	Votes	%	+/–	Seats			
Party	Votes	%	+/–	Con.	List	Total	+–
Social Democratic Party	1,235,631	46.91	+4.30	42	6	48	+4
Christian Democratic Union	843,041	32.00	+7.87	6	26	32	+8
Free Democratic Party	250,310	9.50	–11.02	0	9	9	–12
All-German Bloc/League of Expellees	193,996	7.36	–0.33	0	7	7	0
German Party	93,260	3.54	+2.37	0	0	0	0
Deutsche Reichspartei	16,178	0.61	New	0	0	0	New
German Community	1,093	0.04	New	0	0	0	New
German People's Party	466	0.02	New	0	0	0	New
Independents	152	0.01	+0.00	0	–	0	0
Total	2,634,127	100.00	–	48	48	96	0
Valid votes	2,634,127	98.26					
Invalid/blank votes	46,691	1.74					
Total votes	2,680,818	100.00					
Registered voters/turnout	3,257,513	82.30					
