= 1995 Hessian state election =

State election in Hesse, Germany

1995 Hesse state election
- 19 February 1995

All 110 seats of the Landtag of Hesse 56 seats needed for a majority
- Turnout: 2,768,821 (66.3%) ▼4.5%
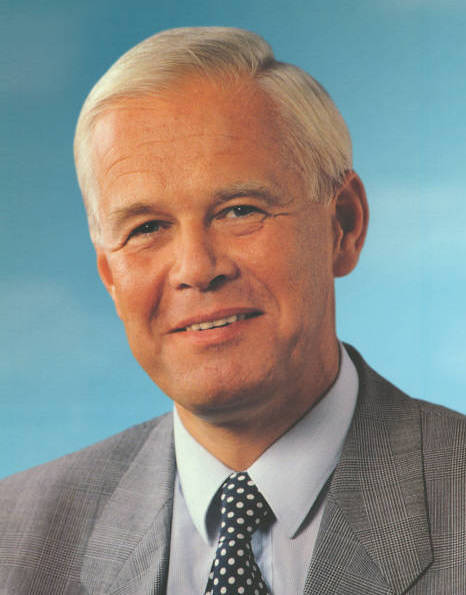

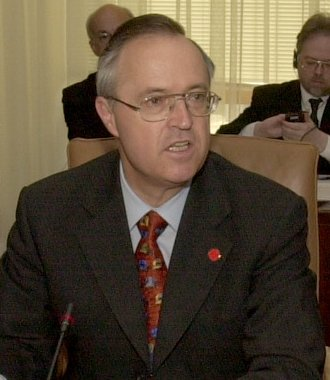

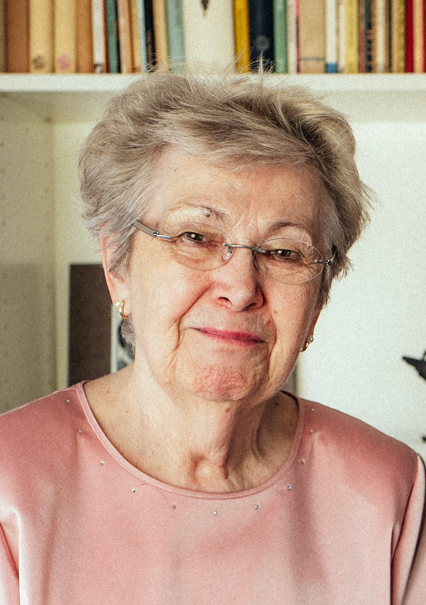
	First party	Second party
Leader	Manfred Kanther	Hans Eichel
Party	CDU	SPD
Last election	46 seats, 40.2%	46 seats, 40.8%
Seats won	45	44
Seat change	▼1	▼2
Popular vote	1,084,146	1,051,452
Percentage	39.2%	38.0%
Swing	▼1.0%	▼2.8%
	Third party	Fourth party
Leader	Iris Blaul; Rupert von Plottnitz	Ruth Wagner
Party	Greens	FDP
Last election	10 seats, 8.8%	8 seats, 7.4%
Seats won	13	8
Seat change	▲3	0
Popular vote	309,897	206,173
Percentage	11.2%	7.4%
Swing	▲2.4%	0.0%
- Results for the single-member constituencies.
Minister-President before election
Hans Eichel
SPD
Elected Minister-President
Hans Eichel
SPD

The 1995 Hessian state election was held on 19 February 1995 to elect the members of the 14th Landtag of Hesse. The outgoing government was a coalition of the Social Democratic Party (SPD) and The Greens led by Minister-President Hans Eichel.

The opposition Christian Democratic Union (CDU) returned as the largest party despite small losses. The SPD lost two seats, but the governing coalition was overall returned with a slightly increased majority due to gains made by the Greens. Hans Eichel was re-elected as Minister-President at the start of April.

The CDU has been the largest party in every election since the 1995 Hessian state election.

== Parties ==
The table below lists parties represented in the previous Landtag of Hesse.

Name		Ideology	Leader(s)	1991 result	
Name		Ideology	Leader(s)	Votes (%)	Seats
SPD	Social Democratic Party of Germany; Sozialdemokratische Partei Deutschlands	Social democracy	Hans Eichel	40.8%	46 / 110
CDU	Christian Democratic Union of Germany; Christlich Demokratische Union Deutschlands	Christian democracy	Manfred Kanther	40.2%	46 / 110
Grüne	Alliance 90/The Greens; Bündnis 90/Die Grünen	Green politics	Iris Blaul; Rupert von Plottnitz	8.8%	10 / 110
FDP	Free Democratic Party; Freie Demokratische Partei	Classical liberalism	Ruth Wagner	7.4%	8 / 110

== Election result ==
Party	Constituency			Party list				Total seats	+/-
Party	Votes	%	Seats	Votes	%	+/-	Seats	Total seats	+/-
Christian Democratic Union	1,154,821	41.88	30	1,084,146	39.16	-1.05	15	45	-1
Social Democratic Party	1,121,943	40.69	25	1,051,452	37.97	-2.86	19	44	▼2
Alliance 90/The Greens	264,117	9.58	0	309,897	11.19	+2.38	13	13	▲3
Free Democratic Party	129,745	4.71	0	206,173	7.45	-0.05	8	8	0
The Republicans	47,254	1.71	0	54,775	1.98	+0.32	0	0	0
The Grays – Gray Panthers	4,705	0.17	0	10,788	0.39	-0.17	0	0	0
League of Free Citizens	4,350	0.15	0	8,570	0.31	New	0	0	New
National Democratic Party	9,543	0.35	0	7,795	0.28	New	0	0	New
Party of Bible-abiding Christians	4,397	0.16	0	6,780	0.24	+0.01	0	0	0
Motorists' and Citizens' Interest Party	932	0.03	0	6,666	0.24	New	0	0	New
Ecological Democratic Party	3,521	0.13	0	5,248	0.19	-0.11	0	0	0
Statt Party	5,015	0.18	0	5,227	0.19	New	0	0	New
Natural Law Party	3,909	0.14	0	4,522	0.16	New	0	0	New
German Communist Party	1,261	0.05	0	3,291	0.12	New	0	0	New
For Non, First, and Protest Voters	369	0.01	0	2,199	0.08	New	0	0	New
German Homeland Party	306	0.01	0	808	0.03	New	0	0	New
Civil Rights Movement Soliarity	557	0.02	0	484	0.02	New	0	0	New
Independents	401	0.01	0	–				0	0
Christian Centre	119	0.00	0	–				0	New
Party of Willing Workers and Disadvantaged	39	0.00	0	–				0	New
Total	2,757,304	100.00	55	2,768,821	100.00		55	110	0
Invalid	75,725	2.67		64,208	2.27				
Turnout	2,833,029	66.27		2,833,029	66.27	-4.53			
Registered voters	4,275,027			4,275,027					

== Sources ==
- Landtagswahlen in Hessen 1946 — 2009
