= Wolfram Dörinkel =

German politician

Member of the Bundestag
- In office October 17, 1961 – October 17, 1965

Personal details
- Born: September 5, 1907 Bad Oeynhausen
- Died: November 26, 1975 (aged 68)
- Party: FDP

Wolfram Dörinkel (September 5, 1907 – November 26, 1975) was a German politician of the Free Democratic Party (FDP) and former member of the German Bundestag.

== Life ==
From 1954 until October 1, 1961 he was a member of the Hessian State Parliament. From October 10, 1957 until he left the state parliament, he was chairman of the FDP state parliament faction as successor to Oswald Adolph Kohut, and from 1958 he was also deputy chairman of the Committee for Economics and Transport.

In the 1961 federal elections, Dörinkel was elected to the German Bundestag via the state list of the FDP Hessen, of which he was a member until 1965.

== Literature ==
Herbst, Ludolf; Jahn, Bruno (2002). Vierhaus, Rudolf (ed.). Biographisches Handbuch der Mitglieder des Deutschen Bundestages. 1949–2002 [Biographical Handbook of the Members of the German Bundestag. 1949–2002] (in German). München: De Gruyter - De Gruyter Saur. p. 1715. ISBN 978-3-11-184511-1.
