= 1966 Hessian state election =

German state election

- 6 November 1966

All 96 seats in the Landtag of Hesse 49 seats needed for a majority
- Turnout: 2,868,446 (81.0% ▲3.2pp)
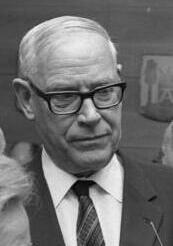

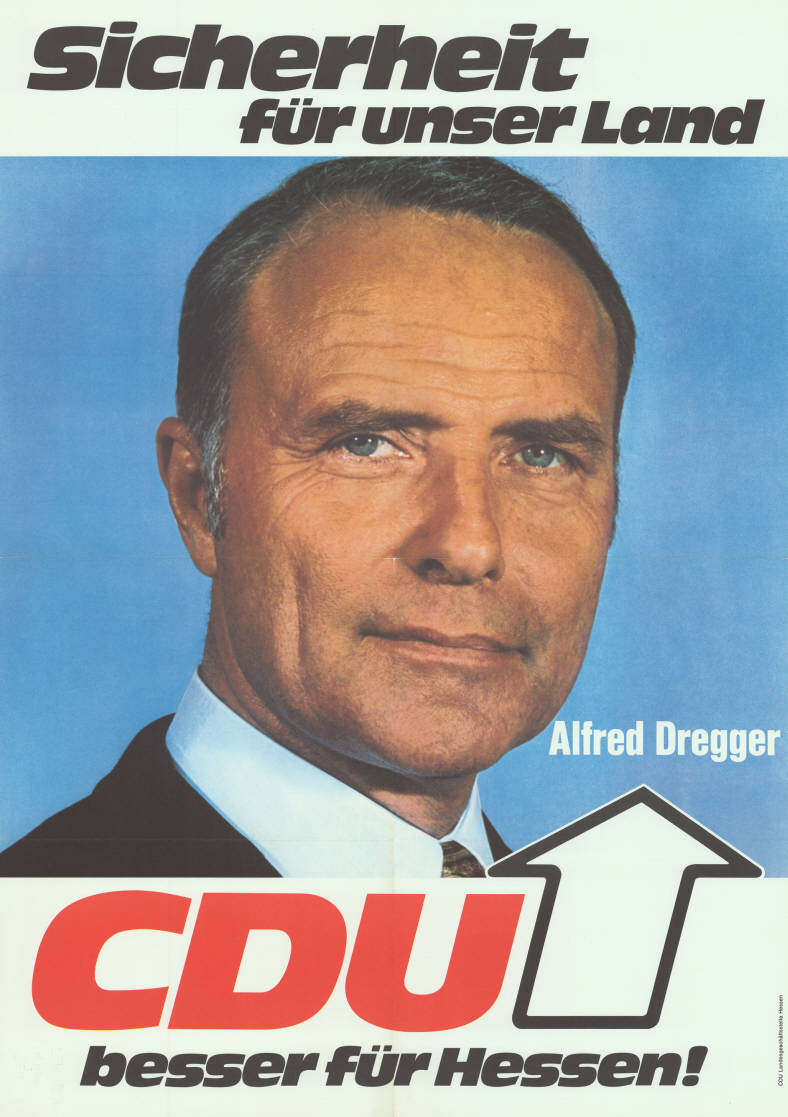
	First party	Second party	Third party
			FDP
Candidate	Georg-August Zinn	Alfred Dregger	Heinrich Kohl
Party	SPD	CDU	FDP
Last election	51 seats, 50.8%	28 seats, 28.8%	11 seats, 11.4%
Seats won	52	26	10
Seat change	▲1	▼2	▼1
Popular vote	1,442,230	745,409	293,394
Percentage	51.0%	26.4%	10.4%
Swing	▲0.2pp	▼2.5pp	▼1.0pp
	Fourth party	Fifth party
Candidate	Heinrich Fassbender
Party	NPD	GDP
Last election	Did not exist	6 seats, 6.3%
Seats won	8	0
Seat change	▲8	▼6
Popular vote	224,674	121,326
Percentage	7.9%	4.3%
Swing	New	▼2.0pp
- Results for the single-member constituencies.
Government before election
Fourth Zinn cabinet
SPD–GDP
Government after election
Fifth Zinn cabinet
SPD

The 1966 Hessian state election was held on 6 November 1966 to elect the 6th Landtag of Hesse. The outgoing government was a majority of the Social Democratic Party (SPD) and All-German Party (GDP) led by Minister-President Georg-August Zinn.

The SPD retained its majority and remained stable on 51%. The opposition Christian Democratic Union (CDU) slipped to 26%, and the Free Democratic Party (FDP) 10%. The GDP, which had been in government with the SPD since 1955, fell to 4% and lost its representation in the Landtag. In its place the new radical right-wing National Democratic Party (NPD), led by former FDP politician Heinrich Fassbender, won 8% and 8 seats. This marked the party's first entry into a state parliament and attracted great attention and concern both domestically and internationally. After the election, the SPD chose to govern alone and Minister-President Zinn continued in office.

== Electoral system ==
The Landtag was elected via mixed-member proportional representation. 48 members were elected in single-member constituencies via first-past-the-post voting, and 48 then allocated using compensatory proportional representation. A single ballot was used for both. An electoral threshold of 5% of valid votes is applied to the Landtag; parties that fall below this threshold are ineligible to receive seats.

== Background ==
In the previous election held on 11 November 1962, the SPD won an absolute majority of both votes and seats for the first time. This came to the detriment of both the CDU and GDP. Despite being able to govern alone, the SPD retained the GDP in its coalition.

== Parties ==
The table below lists parties represented in the 5th Landtag of Hesse.

Name		Ideology	Lead candidate	1962 result	
Name		Ideology	Lead candidate	Votes (%)	Seats
SPD	Social Democratic Party of Germany; Sozialdemokratische Partei Deutschlands	Social democracy	Georg-August Zinn	50.8%	51 / 96
CDU	Christian Democratic Union of Germany; Christlich Demokratische Union Deutschlands	Christian democracy	Alfred Dregger	28.8%	28 / 96
FDP	Free Democratic Party; Freie Demokratische Partei	Classical liberalism	Heinrich Kohl	11.4%	11 / 96
GDP	All-German Party; Gesamtdeutsche Partei	National conservatism		6.3%	6 / 96

== Results ==
Party	Votes	%	+/–	Seats			
Party	Votes	%	+/–	Con.	List	Total	+–
Social Democratic Party	1,442,230	51.00	+0.16	44	8	52	+1
Christian Democratic Union	745,409	26.36	–2.48	4	22	26	–2
Free Democratic Party	293,994	10.40	–1.05	0	10	10	–1
National Democratic Party	224,674	7.95	New	0	8	8	New
All-German Party	121,326	4.29	–2.05	0	0	0	–6
Total	2,827,633	100.00	–	48	48	96	0
Valid votes	2,827,633	98.58					
Invalid/blank votes	40,813	1.42					
Total votes	2,868,446	100.00					
Registered voters/turnout	3,543,079	80.96					
