= 1962 Hessian state election =

German state election

- 11 November 1962

All 96 seats in the Landtag of Hesse 49 seats needed for a majority
- Turnout: 2,681,995 (77.7% ▼4.6pp)
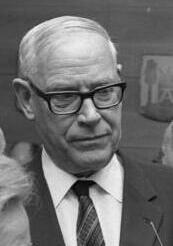

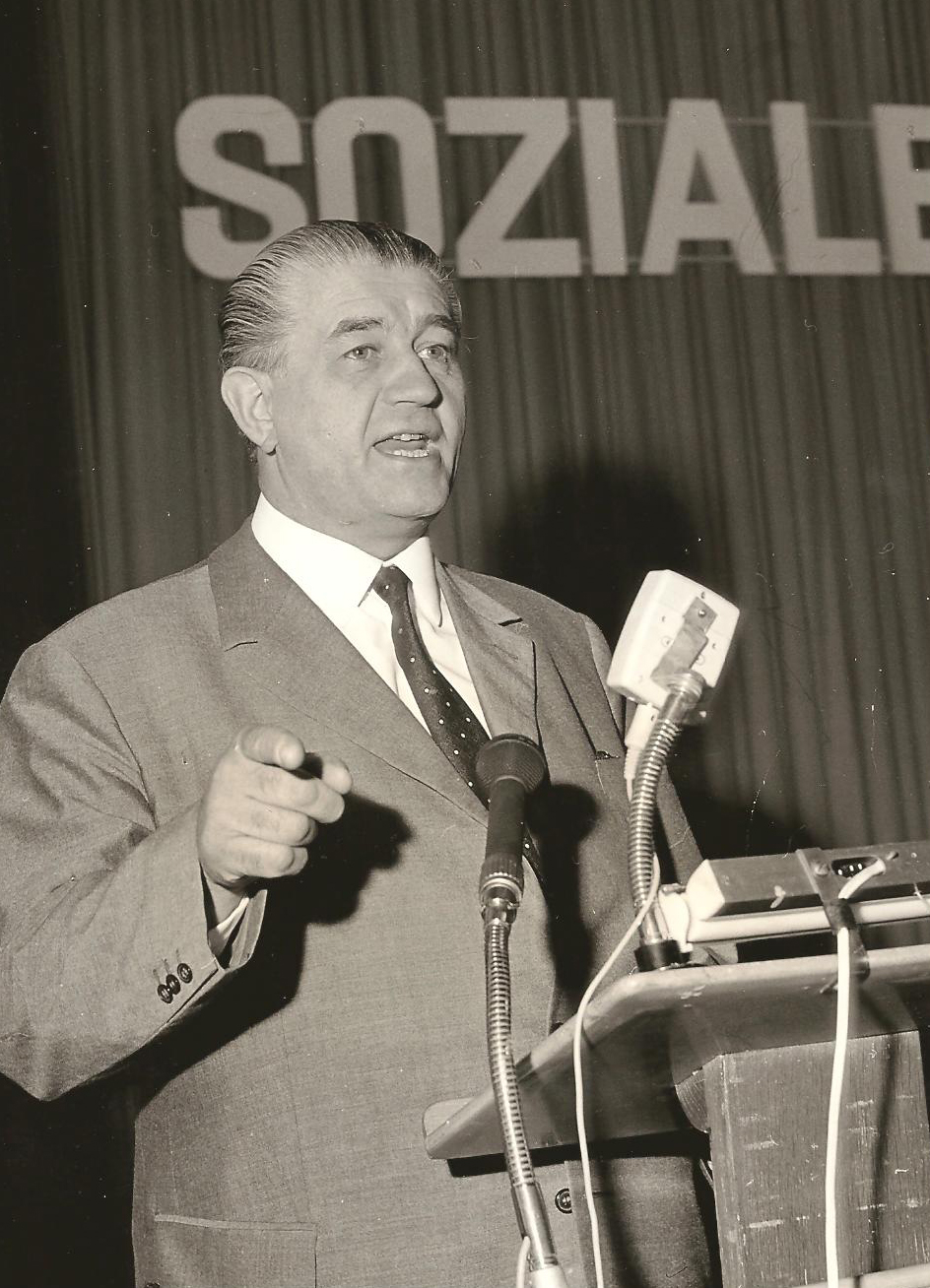
	First party	Second party
Candidate	Georg-August Zinn	Wilhelm Fay
Party	SPD	CDU
Last election	48 seats, 46.9%	32 seats, 32.0%
Seats won	51	28
Seat change	▲3	▼4
Popular vote	1,340,625	760,435
Percentage	50.8%	28.8%
Swing	▲3.9pp	▼3.2pp
	Third party	Fourth party
Candidate	Heinrich Kohl	Gustav Hacker
Party	FDP	GDP
Last election	9 seats, 9.5%	7 seats, 10.9% (Note: Aggregate of GB/BHE (7.4%) and DP (3.5%).)
Seats won	11	6
Seat change	▲2	▼1
Popular vote	301,783	167,090
Percentage	11.4%	6.3%
Swing	▲1.9pp	▼4.6pp
- Results for the single-member constituencies.
Government before election
Third Zinn cabinet
SPD–GDP
Government after election
Fourth Zinn cabinet
SPD–GDP

The 1962 Hessian state election was held on 11 November 1962 to elect the 5th Landtag of Hesse. The outgoing government was a coalition of the Social Democratic Party (SPD) and All-German Party (GDP) led by Minister-President Georg-August Zinn.

The result was a landslide for the SPD, which won an absolute majority of both votes and seats for the first time. The opposition Christian Democratic Union (CDU) slid to 29%, while the Free Democratic Party (FDP) recorded small gains. The SPD's coalition partner the GDP, formed by a merger of the GB/BHE and DP the previous year, retained six seats but failed to capture as many votes as the two partners had separately in 1958. Despite its majority, the SPD maintained its coalition with the GDP and continued in office.

== Electoral system ==
The Landtag was elected via mixed-member proportional representation. 48 members were elected in single-member constituencies via first-past-the-post voting, and 48 then allocated using compensatory proportional representation. A single ballot was used for both. An electoral threshold of 5% of valid votes is applied to the Landtag; parties that fall below this threshold are ineligible to receive seats.

== Background ==
In the previous election held on 23 November 1958, the SPD retained a clear first place with 44% of the vote despite a substantial swing to the CDU resulting from the collapse of the FDP vote, which fell to 10%. The SPD's coalition partner the GB/BHE remained steady on 7% and the government continued in office.

== Parties ==
The table below lists parties represented in the 4th Landtag of Hesse.

Name		Ideology	Lead candidate	1958 result	
Name		Ideology	Lead candidate	Votes (%)	Seats
SPD	Social Democratic Party of Germany; Sozialdemokratische Partei Deutschlands	Social democracy	Georg-August Zinn	46.9%	48 / 96
CDU	Christian Democratic Union of Germany; Christlich Demokratische Union Deutschlands	Christian democracy	Wilhelm Fay	32.0%	32 / 96
FDP	Free Democratic Party; Freie Demokratische Partei	Classical liberalism	Heinrich Kohl	9.5%	11 / 96
GDP	All-German Party; Gesamtdeutsche Partei	National conservatism	Gustav Hacker	10.9%	7 / 96

== Results ==
Party	Votes	%	+/–	Seats			
Party	Votes	%	+/–	Con.	List	Total	+–
Social Democratic Party	1,340,625	50.28	+3.94	44	7	51	+3
Christian Democratic Union	760,435	28.52	–3.17	4	24	28	–4
Free Democratic Party	301,783	11.32	+1.94	0	11	11	+2
All-German Party	167,090	6.27	–4.57	0	6	6	–1
German Peace Union	94,956	3.56	New	0	0	0	New
German Community	1,433	0.05	+0.01	0	0	0	0
Total	2,666,322	100.00	–	48	48	96	0
Valid votes	2,666,322	98.33					
Invalid/blank votes	45,192	1.67					
Total votes	2,711,514	100.00					
Registered voters/turnout	3,451,314	78.56					
