= 1954 Hessian state election =

German state election

- 28 November 1954

All 96 seats in the Landtag of Hesse 49 seats needed for a majority
- Turnout: 2,559,409 (82.4% ▲17.5pp)
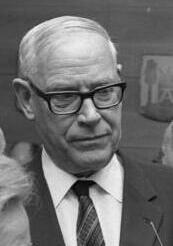

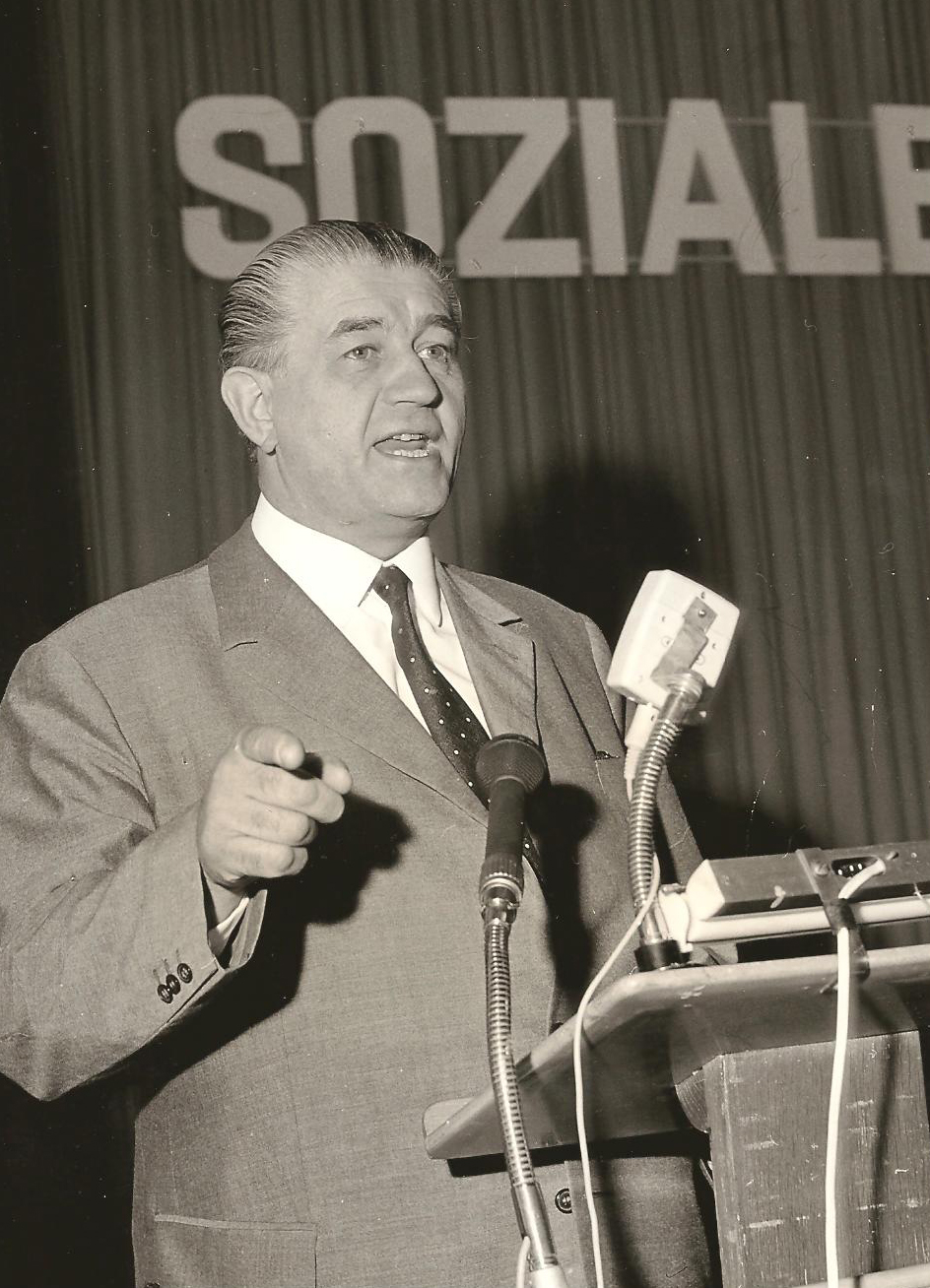

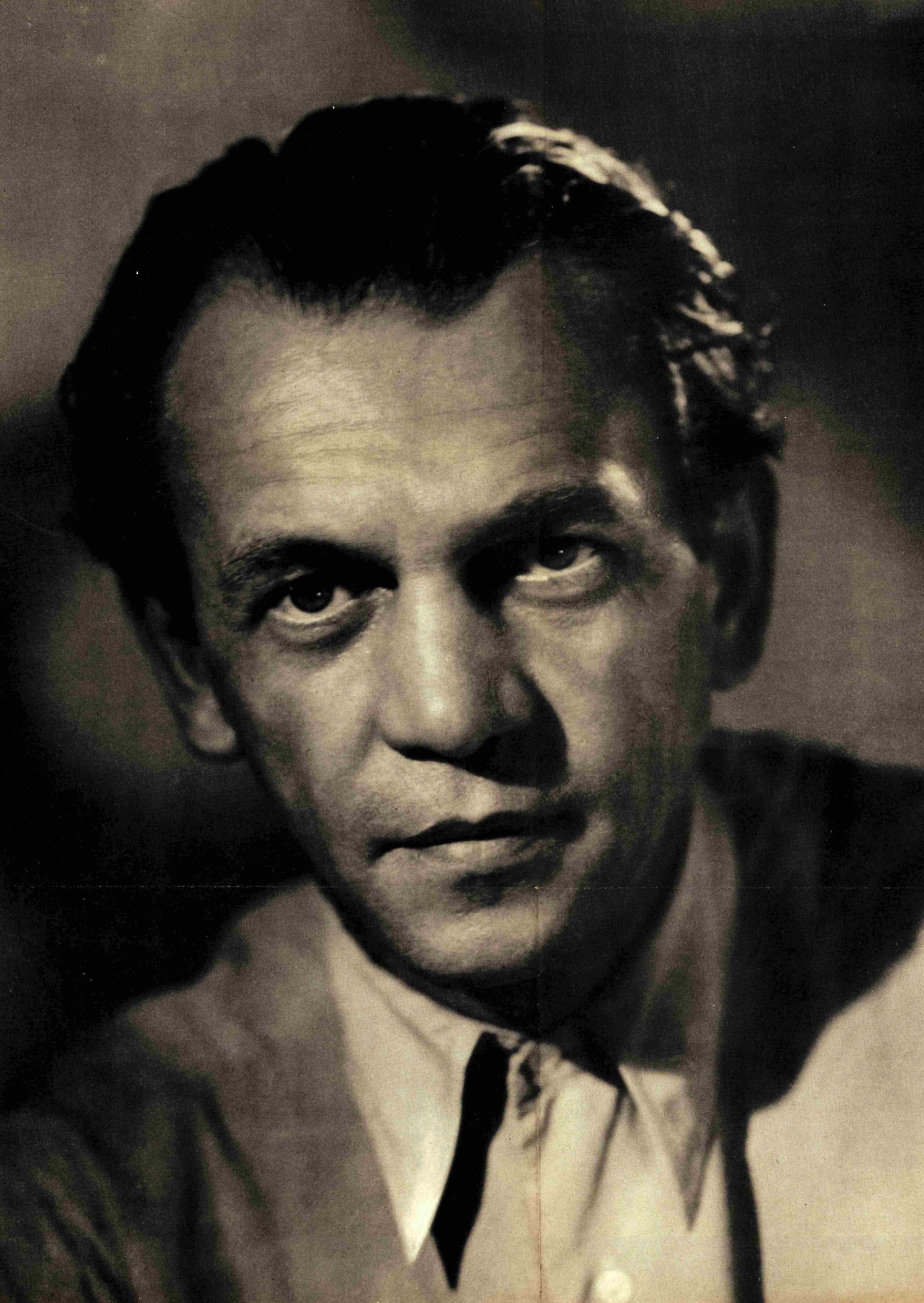
	First party	Second party
Candidate	Georg-August Zinn	Wilhelm Fay
Party	SPD	CDU
Last election	47 seats, 44.4%	12 seats, 18.8%
Seats won	44	24
Seat change	▼3	▲12
Popular vote	1,065,733	603,691
Percentage	42.6%	24.1%
Swing	▼1.8pp	▲5.3pp
	Third party	Fourth party
Candidate	August-Martin Euler	Gotthard Franke
Party	FDP	GB/BHE
Last election	(Note: Previously ran with GB/BHE, winning 31.8% and 21 seats (13 FDP).)	(Note: Previously ran with FDP, winning 31.8% and 21 seats (8 GB/BHE).)
Seats won	21	7
Seat change	▲8	▼1
Popular vote	513,421	192,390
Percentage	20.5%	7.7%
Swing	New	New
- Results for the single-member constituencies.
Government before election
First Zinn cabinet
SPD
Government after election
Second Zinn cabinet
SPD–GB/BHE

The 1954 Hessian state election was held on 28 November 1954 to elect the 3rd Landtag of Hesse. The outgoing government was a majority of the Social Democratic Party (SPD) led by Minister-President Georg-August Zinn.

The election saw the Free Democratic Party (FDP) displaced as the main opposition party by the Christian Democratic Union (CDU). The All-German Bloc/League of Expellees (GB/BHE), which in 1950 ran in alliance with the FDP, won 8%. Modifications to the electoral system saw the SPD deprived of its majority despite only minor losses, and the party formed a coalition with the GB/HBE.

== Electoral system ==
The Landtag was elected via mixed-member proportional representation. 48 members were elected in single-member constituencies via first-past-the-post voting, and 48 then allocated using compensatory proportional representation. A single ballot was used for both. The size of the Landtag was increased in this election from 80 to 96 by the addition of more compensatory seats. An electoral threshold of 5% of valid votes is applied to the Landtag; parties that fall below this threshold are ineligible to receive seats.

== Background ==
In the previous election held on 19 November 1950, the SPD won a majority of seats with 44% of the vote. An alliance of the FDP and GB/BHE made up the second largest group, winning 32%, followed by the CDU on 19%. This represented a major reversal in the two parties' positions compared to 1946. The Communist Party (KPD) narrowly fell below the 5% threshold and lost its seats. Georg-August Zinn became Minister-President in the new SPD majority government.

== Parties ==
The table below lists parties represented in the 2nd Landtag of Hesse.

Name		Ideology	Lead candidate	1950 result	
Name		Ideology	Lead candidate	Votes (%)	Seats
SPD	Social Democratic Party of Germany; Sozialdemokratische Partei Deutschlands	Social democracy	Georg-August Zinn	44.4%	47 / 80
FDP	Free Democratic Party; Freie Demokratische Partei	Classical liberalism	August-Martin Euler	31.8%	13 / 80
GB/BHE	All-German Bloc/League of Expellees and Deprived of Rights; Gesamtdeutscher Block/Bund der Heimatvertriebenen und Entrechteten	National conservatism	Gotthard Franke	31.8%	8 / 80
CDU	Christian Democratic Union of Germany; Christlich Demokratische Union Deutschlands	Christian democracy	Wilhelm Fay	18.8%	12 / 80

== Results ==
Party	Votes	%	+/–	Seats			
Party	Votes	%	+/–	Con.	List	Total	+–
Social Democratic Party	1,065,733	42.61	–1.76	41	3	44	–3
Christian Democratic Union	603,691	24.14	+5.33	5	19	24	+12
Free Democratic Party	513,421	20.53	New	2	19	21	+8
All-German Bloc/League of Expellees	192,390	7.69	New	0	7	7	–1
Communist Party	84,013	3.36	–1.39	0	0	0	0
German Party	29,309	1.17	New	0	0	0	New
Alliance of Germans	12,047	0.48	New	0	0	0	New
Free Opposition	416	0.02	New	0	0	0	New
Independents	253	0.01	–0.05	0	–	0	0
Total	2,501,273	100.00	–	48	48	96	+16
Valid votes	2,501,273	97.73					
Invalid/blank votes	58,136	2.27					
Total votes	2,559,409	100.00					
Registered voters/turnout	3,105,125	82.43					
