= 1970 Hessian state election =

German state election

- 8 November 1970

All 110 seats in the Landtag of Hesse 56 seats needed for a majority
- Turnout: 3,171,227 (82.8% ▲1.9pp)
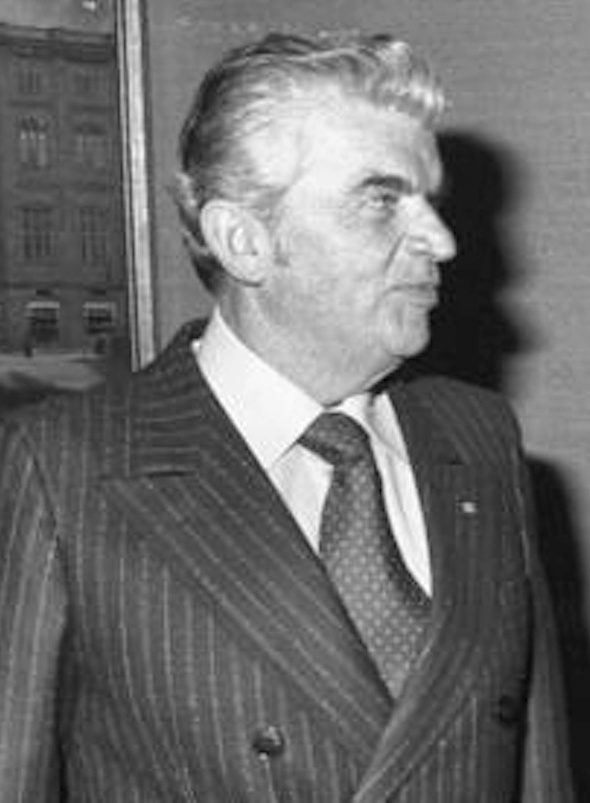

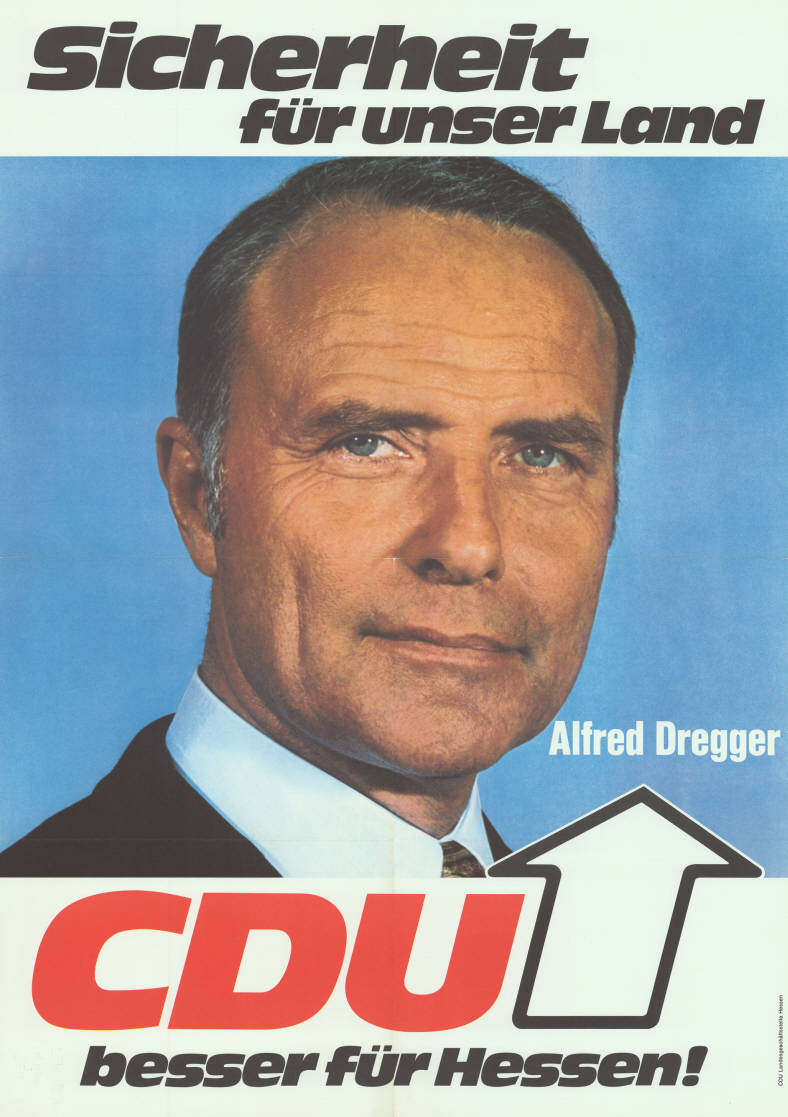

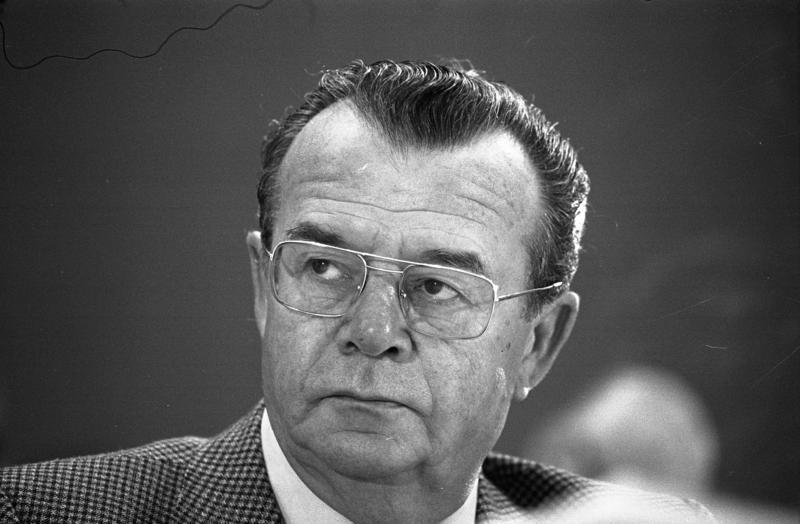
	First party	Second party
Candidate	Albert Osswald	Alfred Dregger
Party	SPD	CDU
Last election	52 seats, 51.0%	26 seats, 26.4%
Seats won	53	46
Seat change	▲1	▲20
Popular vote	1,442,201	1,248,543
Percentage	45.9%	39.7%
Swing	▼5.1pp	▲13.4pp
	Third party	Fourth party
Candidate	Heinz-Herbert Karry
Party	FDP	NPD
Last election	10 seats, 10.4%	8 seats, 7.9%
Seats won	11	0
Seat change	▲1	▼8
Popular vote	316,270	94,531
Percentage	10.1%	3.0%
Swing	▼0.3pp	▼4.9pp
- Results for the single-member constituencies.
Government before election
First Osswald cabinet
SPD
Government after election
Second Osswald cabinet
SPD–FDP

The 1970 Hessian state election was held on 8 November 1970 to elect the 7th Landtag of Hesse. The outgoing government was a majority of the Social Democratic Party (SPD) led by Minister-President Albert Osswald.

The opposition Christian Democratic Union (CDU), which had taken a hard line against the SPD under new leader Alfred Dregger, recorded a major swing of 13 percentage points in its favour, to the detriment of the SPD and National Democratic Party, the latter losing all its seats after a single term in the Landtag. The SPD remained the largest party with 46%, and subsequently formed a coalition with the Free Democratic Party, following in the footsteps of the federal government formed the previous year.

== Electoral system ==
The Landtag was elected via mixed-member proportional representation. The size of the Landtag was increased in this election from 96 to 110 members. 55 members were elected in single-member constituencies via first-past-the-post voting, and 55 then allocated using compensatory proportional representation. A single ballot was used for both. An electoral threshold of 5% of valid votes is applied to the Landtag; parties that fall below this threshold are ineligible to receive seats.

== Background ==
In the previous election held on 6 November 1966, the SPD retained its majority with 51% of the vote. The CDU and FDP both stagnated on 26% and 10% respectively, while the new right-wing NPD capitalised on discontent over the economy and the major parties and entered the Landtag with 8%. This marked the party's first success in an election and was followed by a string of similar showings in other states over the following two years. In October 1969, long-serving Minister-President Georg-August Zinn resigned after 19 years in office after suffering a severe stroke. He was succeeded by finance minister Albert Osswald.

== Parties ==
The table below lists parties represented in the 6th Landtag of Hesse.

Name		Ideology	Lead candidate	1966 result	
Name		Ideology	Lead candidate	Votes (%)	Seats
SPD	Social Democratic Party of Germany; Sozialdemokratische Partei Deutschlands	Social democracy	Albert Osswald	51.0%	52 / 96
CDU	Christian Democratic Union of Germany; Christlich Demokratische Union Deutschlands	Christian democracy	Alfred Dregger	26.4%	26 / 96
FDP	Free Democratic Party; Freie Demokratische Partei	Classical liberalism	Heinz Herbert Karry	10.4%	10 / 96
NPD	National Democratic Party of Germany; Nationaldemokratische Partei Deutschlands	German nationalism		7.9%	8 / 96

== Results ==
Party	Votes	%	+/–	Seats			
Party	Votes	%	+/–	Con.	List	Total	+–
Social Democratic Party	1,442,201	45.90	–5.10	38	15	53	+1
Christian Democratic Union	1,248,453	39.74	+13.38	17	29	46	+20
Free Democratic Party	316,270	10.07	–0.33	0	11	11	+1
National Democratic Party	94,531	3.01	–4.94	0	0	0	–8
German Communist Party	36,712	1.17	New	0	0	0	New
European Workers' Party	3,649	0.12	New	0	0	0	New
Total	3,141,816	100.00	–	55	55	110	+14
Valid votes	3,141,816	99.07					
Invalid/blank votes	29,411	0.93					
Total votes	3,171,227	100.00					
Registered voters/turnout	3,828,701	82.83					
