= Werner Hilpert =

German politician (1897–1957)

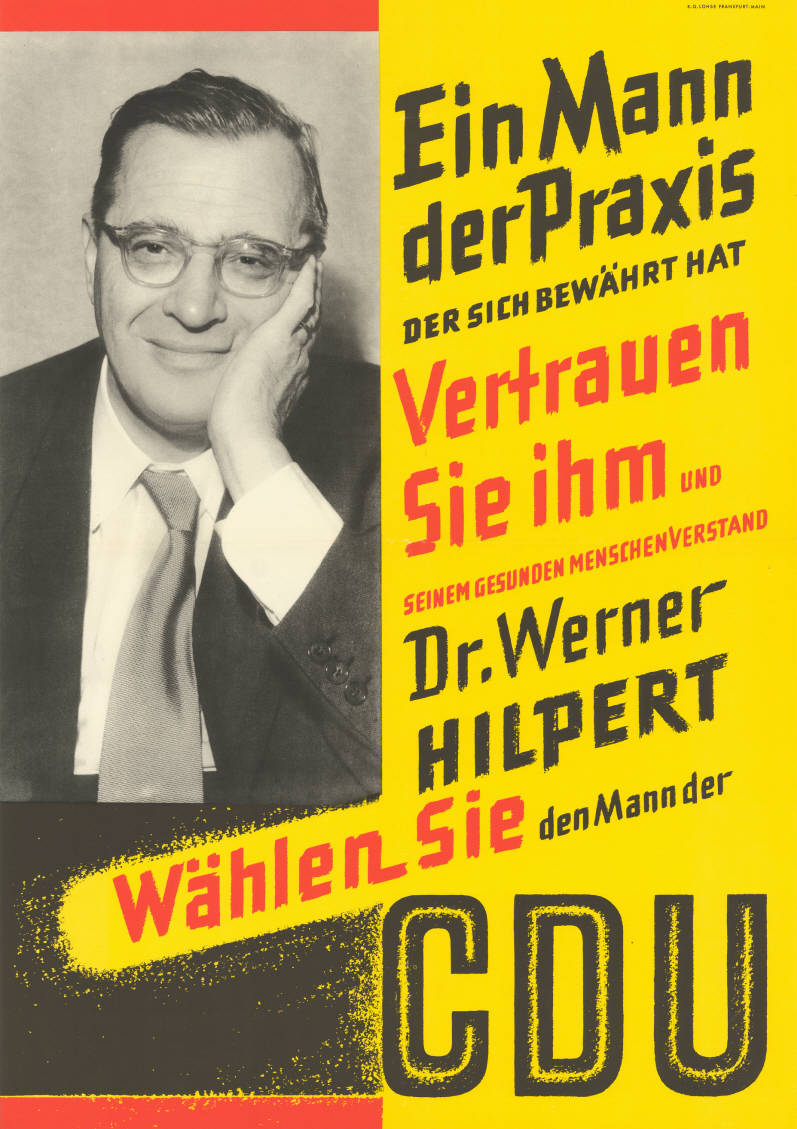
- Werner Hilpert on a campaign poster for the 1946 state election

Member of the Bundestag
- In office 7 September 1949 – 10 October 1949

Personal details
- Born: 17 January 1897 Leipzig
- Died: 24 February 1957 (aged 60) Oberursel, Hesse, Germany
- Party: CDU

Werner Johannes Hilpert (17 January 1897 in Leipzig; died 24 February 1957 in Oberursel) was a German politician of the Centre Party and CDU, and is largely considered one of the founding fathers of the Federal Republic of Germany.

== Early life ==
Werner Hilpert was born in Leipzig on 17 January 1897 as the first son of Johann Baptist und Martha (Rabe) Hilpert. His father held various jobs at the firm Giesecke & Devrient ranging from engraver to manager. After experiencing considerable success throughout his time at Gymnasium, Hilpert was awarded a scholarship and began studying economics, legal science, and philosophy at the university in April 1916.

Hilpert's studies were interrupted only four months later by World War I. He was drafted in July 1916 and fought in Romania and France. He received both the Friedrich-August-Medal and Iron Cross (second class) for his service. After returning home in November 1918 Hilpert continued his studies, receiving his doctorate in philosophy in July 1920. During this time he became a member of the Kartellverband katholischer deutscher Studentenvereine, to which he remained associated until his death.

Hilpert decided against a career in academia and began to work instead for the Statebank of Saxony. After working his way from the role of unsalaried clerk to department secretary, he began working as an assistant to the Union of Leipzig Retailers. At the end of 1922 he began working as a syndic whose job it was to regulate the financial issues of the enterprisers and employers of the retailers. Under his guidance the Leipzig Retailers Union attained a leading role among the retailer unions of Germany. During this time he worked with his colleague and close friend Otto Kitzinger to begin producing "Der Einzelhandelsdienst," a newspaper for retailers. Between 1922 and 1932 he also worked as the chief executive officer of the Linoleum Merchants Union, a cartel.

== Nazi-Era ==
Hilpert began working in politics in 1927 as a member of the Leipzig city council. During his time on the Leipzig city council, he preoccupied himself primarily with economic issues. In 1932, with his election as President of the Centre Party in Saxony, Hilpert began investing himself more deeply in the political realm.

The rise to power of the Nazis abruptly changed his living situation. He lost his position in the city council and was forced by the Nazis to give up his position in the Centre Party in the summer of 1933. He began working as a self-employed business consultant and, through this work, became intertwined with numerous Jewish businessmen and women. In spite of the anti-Jewish laws of the Nazis, Hilpert continued to try to provide Jewish business owners with the best working conditions he could secure.

His work for the Jewish community resulted in ongoing trouble for Hilpert with the Nazi Regime. Furthermore, Hilpert's role as President of the Catholic Action in Saxony from 1932 until 1937, in which he worked for the strengthening of Christian ethics throughout society, provided further conflict with the Nazis. Because of his role with the Catholic Action, Hilpert received notice in June 1934 that he was at risk of being arrested in connection with the Röhm-Putsch. On Kristallnacht in 1938, Hilpert's office was burned down.

As a member of a list constructed by the Nazis of potentially dangerous persons, Hilpert was arrested by the Gestapo on 1 September 1939. He spent the next five and a half years in Buchenwald concentration camp as a political prisoner. During this time he wore the number 5618 and performed forced labor. He was a member of the Buchenwald Resistance and came to know Eugen Kogon through their mutual work in the camp's tailor shop.

== Post-War ==
After spending nearly six years in Buchenwald, Hilpert seized the opportunity to take part in the restructuring of political and societal life in Germany. He took part in founding the CDU party in the federal state of Hesse in July 1945 and was elected President of the CDU Hesse in November of the same year. His primary goal was to overcome the religious division and class structure of Germany in order to create a unified party whose priority would be listening and responding to not only the middle class but also the working class.

Hilpert served as governor of Hesse until 1947, when he became Minister of Finance. He was a member of the Bundestag throughout the first legislative session until his resignation on 10 October 1949. He served as President and Finance Director of the Deutsche Bundesbahn from 1952 until his death in Oberursel on 24 February 1957.
