= Feminist Party of Germany =

Feminist Party of Germany Feministische Partei Die Frauen
- Abbreviation: DIE FRAUEN
- Presidium: Adelheid Wohlfart, Blanca Murillo-Polle, Sigrid Werner
- Founded: 10/11 June 1995
- Membership: ca. 400
- Ideology: Feminism
- Continental affiliation: Feminists United Network Europe
- Colors: Orange

Website
- http://www.feministischepartei.de

The Feminist Party of Germany (German: Feministische Partei Die Frauen) is a political party in Germany.

In the 2005 German federal election, the party won 0.1% of the popular vote and no seats. They repeated this result at the 2019 European Parliament election in Germany.

The feminist Party of Germany is a founding member of the Feminists United Network Europe (FUN Europe).

On October 30, 2010, the first European Conference of Feminist Parties took place in Valencia, Spain. An umbrella organization of feminist parties in Europe was founded. The Initiativa Feminista from Spain, the Partia Kobiet (women's party) from Poland and the Feministiskt initiativ from Sweden together with the feminist party DIE FRAUEN founded a coordination council as the umbrella organization of the feminist parties in Europe. FUN is the name of the network, which was expanded to include political groups from other countries.
