= 1991 Hessian state election =

1991 Hesse state election
- 20 January 1991

All 110 seats of the Landtag of Hesse 56 seats needed for a majority
- Turnout: 2,974,872 (70.8%) ▼9.5%
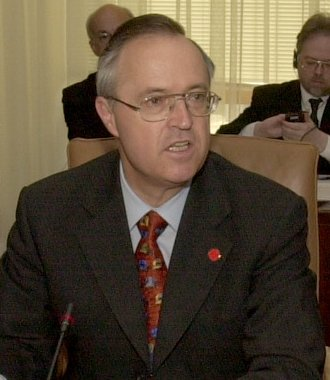

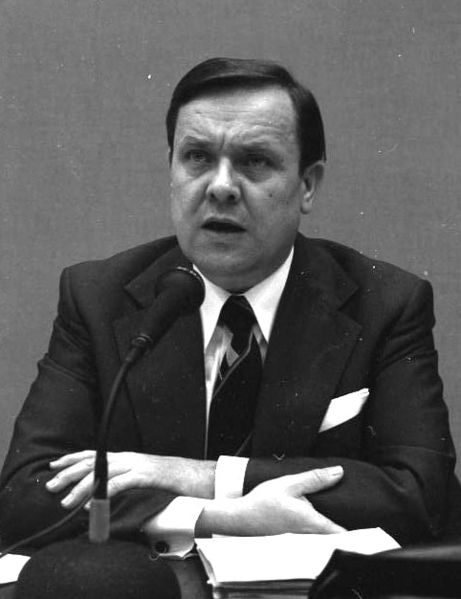

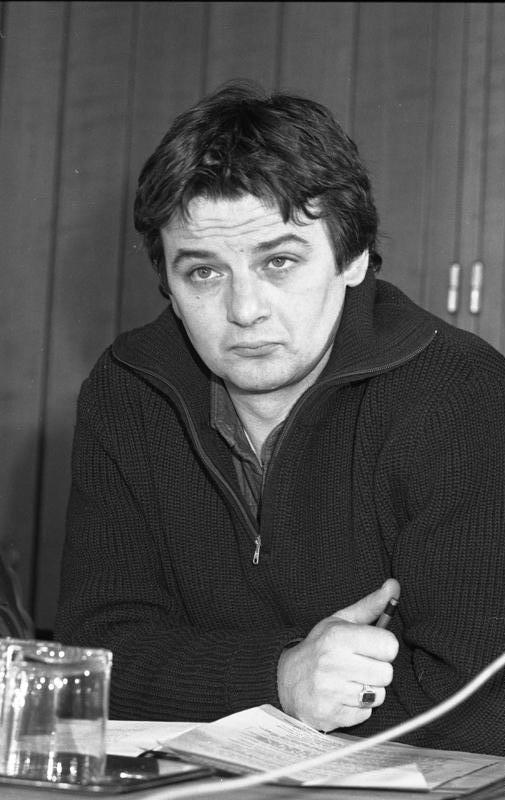

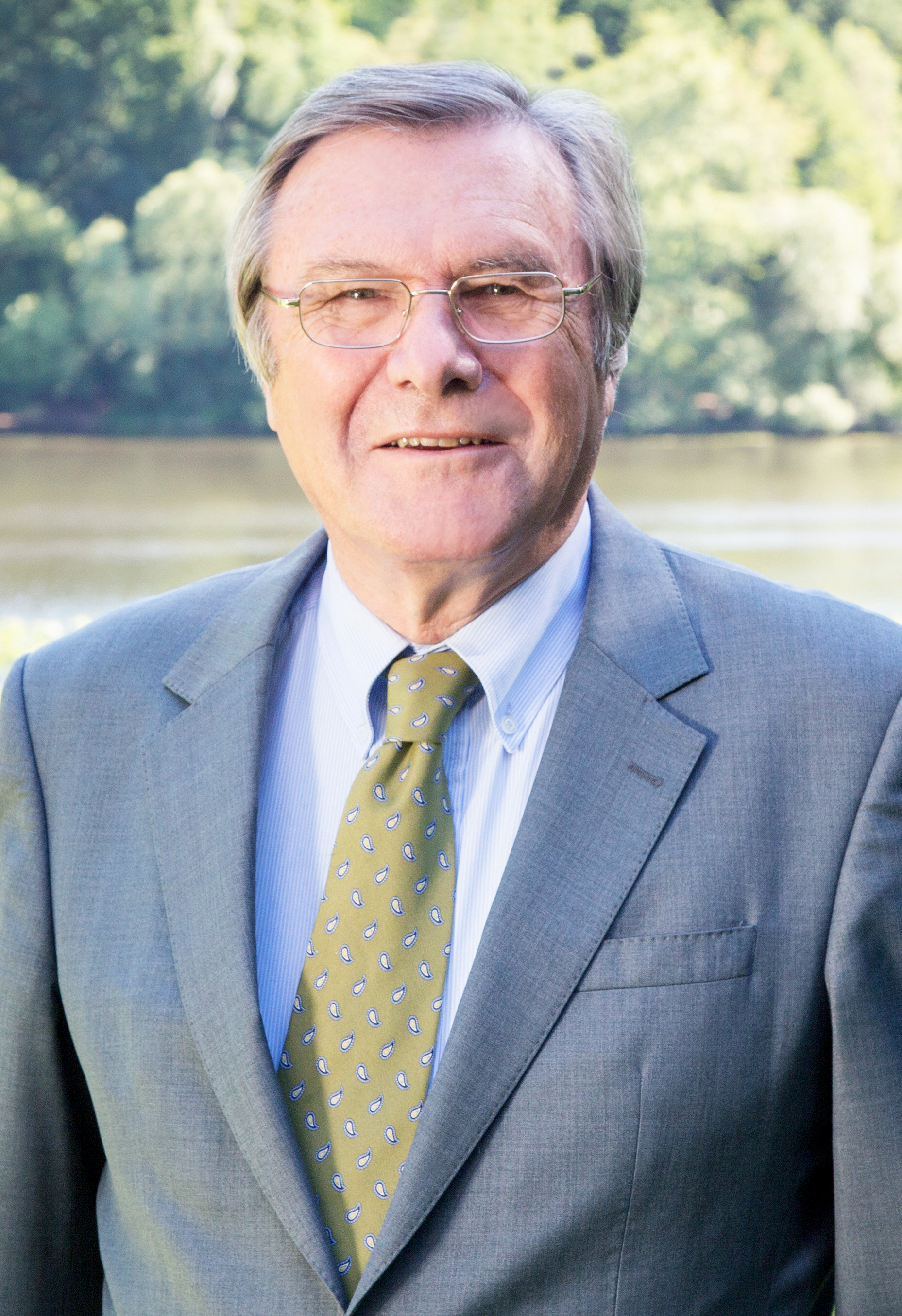
	First party	Second party
Leader	Hans Eichel	Walter Wallmann
Party	SPD	CDU
Last election	44 seats, 40.2%	47 seats, 42.1%
Seats won	46	46
Seat change	▲2	▼1
Popular vote	1,213,909	1,195,965
Percentage	40.8%	40.2%
Swing	▲0.6%	▼1.9%
	Third party	Fourth party
Leader	Iris Blaul; Joschka Fischer	Wolfgang Gerhardt
Party	Greens	FDP
Last election	10 seats, 9.4%	9 seats, 7.8%
Seats won	10	8
Seat change	0	▼1
Popular vote	262,161	220,115
Percentage	8.8%	7.4%
Swing	▼0.6%	▼0.4%
- Results for the single-member constituencies.
Minister-President before election
Walter Wallmann
CDU
Elected Minister-President
Hans Eichel
SPD

The 1991 Hessian state election was held on 20 January 1991 to elect the members of the 13th Landtag of Hesse. The outgoing government was a coalition of the Christian Democratic Union (CDU) and Free Democratic Party (FDP) led by Minister-President Walter Wallmann.

The opposition Social Democratic Party (SPD) became the most popular party on a small swing, tying with the CDU in terms of seats. The incumbent government narrowly lost its majority, ceding two seats to the SPD. The Greens finished narrowly ahead of the FDP and subsequently formed a coalition government with the SPD. Hans Eichel became Minister-President at the start of April.

== Parties ==
The table below lists parties represented in the previous Landtag of Hesse.

Name		Ideology	Leader(s)	1987 result	
Name		Ideology	Leader(s)	Votes (%)	Seats
CDU	Christian Democratic Union of Germany; Christlich Demokratische Union Deutschlands	Christian democracy	Walter Wallmann	42.1%	47 / 110
SPD	Social Democratic Party of Germany; Sozialdemokratische Partei Deutschlands	Social democracy	Hans Eichel	40.2%	44 / 110
Grüne	The Greens; Die Grünen	Green politics	Iris Blaul; Joschka Fischer	9.4%	10 / 110
FDP	Free Democratic Party; Freie Demokratische Partei	Classical liberalism	Wolfgang Gerhardt	7.8%	9 / 110

== Election result ==
Party	Constituency			Party list				Total seats	+/-
Party	Votes	%	Seats	Votes	%	+/-	Seats	Total seats	+/-
Social Democratic Party	1,289,735	43.58	31	1,214,909	40.84	+0.64	15	46	+2
Christian Democratic Union	1,246,046	42.10	24	1,195,965	40.20	-1.91	22	46	▼1
The Greens	212,795	7.19	0	262,161	8.81	-0.59	10	10	0
Free Democratic Party	185,413	6.27	0	220,115	7.40	-0.42	8	8	▼1
The Republicans	8,644	0.29	0	49,320	1.66	New	0	0	New
The Grays – Gray Panthers	9,273	0.31	0	16,521	0.56	New	0	0	New
Ecological Democratic Party	4,652	0.16	0	8,772	0.29	+0.16	0	0	0
Party of Bible-abiding Christians	137	0.00	0	7,109	0.24	New	0	0	New
Total	2,959,469	100.00	55	2,974,872	100.00		55	110	0
Invalid	69,471	2.29		54,068	1.79				
Turnout	3,028,940	70.80		3,028,940	70.80	-9.50			
Registered voters	4,278,151			4,278,151					

== Sources ==
- Landtagswahlen in Hessen 1946 — 2009
