= Christian Stock =

German politician

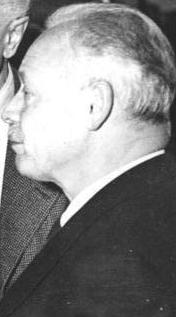
Christian Stock in 1947

Christian Stock (28 August 1884, Darmstadt, Grand Duchy of Hesse – 13 April 1967 in Seeheim-Jugenheim) was a German Social Democrat politician and the first Minister-President of the provisional state of Greater Hesse (later Hesse), which had been constituted in the aftermath of World War II.

Stock was over 82 at the time of his death, making him the oldest Minister-President that the Republic had had until then.
