= Albert Osswald =

German politician (1919–1996)

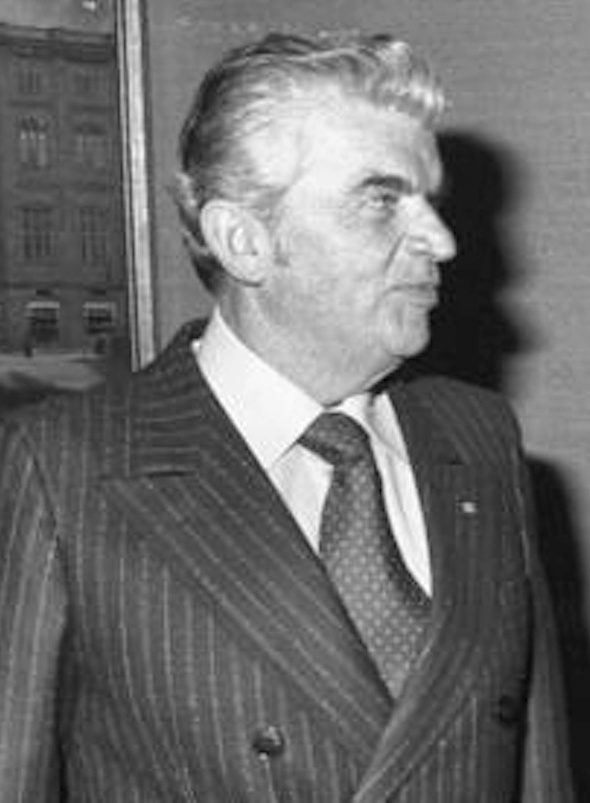
Osswald in 1975

Albert Osswald (16 May 1919 – 15 August 1996) was a German politician (SPD). He served as the 3rd Minister President of the state of Hesse from 1969 to 1976 and as the 27th President of the Bundesrat in 1975/76.

== Biography ==
Oswald was born as the son of a mason in Giessen. After elementary and secondary school in Giessen, he attended a vocational school for salesmen. During World War II he was a soldier of the German army.

In 1945, he joined the Social Democratic Party of Germany. After local offices in Giessen – from 1957 to 1963, he served as the Lord Mayor (Oberbürgermeister) of the city, he was elected to the parliament of Hesse in 1954. From 1962 to 1969, he served as minister in the government of Hesse, first as minister of economic affairs, later as minister of finance. Osswald was elected prime minister of Hesse in 1969, after the demission of Georg August Zinn. His government had an absolute majority in the beginning. From 1970 on, Osswald headed a coalition government of SPD and FDP. After a financial scandal involving the public bank Helaba, Osswald resigned as prime minister of Hesse in October 1976. He retired from all political offices in 1977.

A native and former mayor of Giessen, Osswald supported the creation of the city of Lahn in 1977 – born out of a merger of Gießen and Wetzlar, describing it as "Work of the Century" (Jahrhundertwerk), believing it would strengthen Central Hesse against the two major population centers of Kassel in the north of the state and Frankfurt in the south. However, the awkwardly performed merger would prove to be unpopular and following SPD's defeat in the 1977 local elections in Lahn to CDU opposed to the city of Lahn, his successor as Minister President Holger Börner (an in-party opponent to Lahn) rescinded the merger in 1979.

Osswald died during a hiking vacation in Schwangau in 1996.
