= Thomas Schäfer (politician) =

German politician (1966–2020)

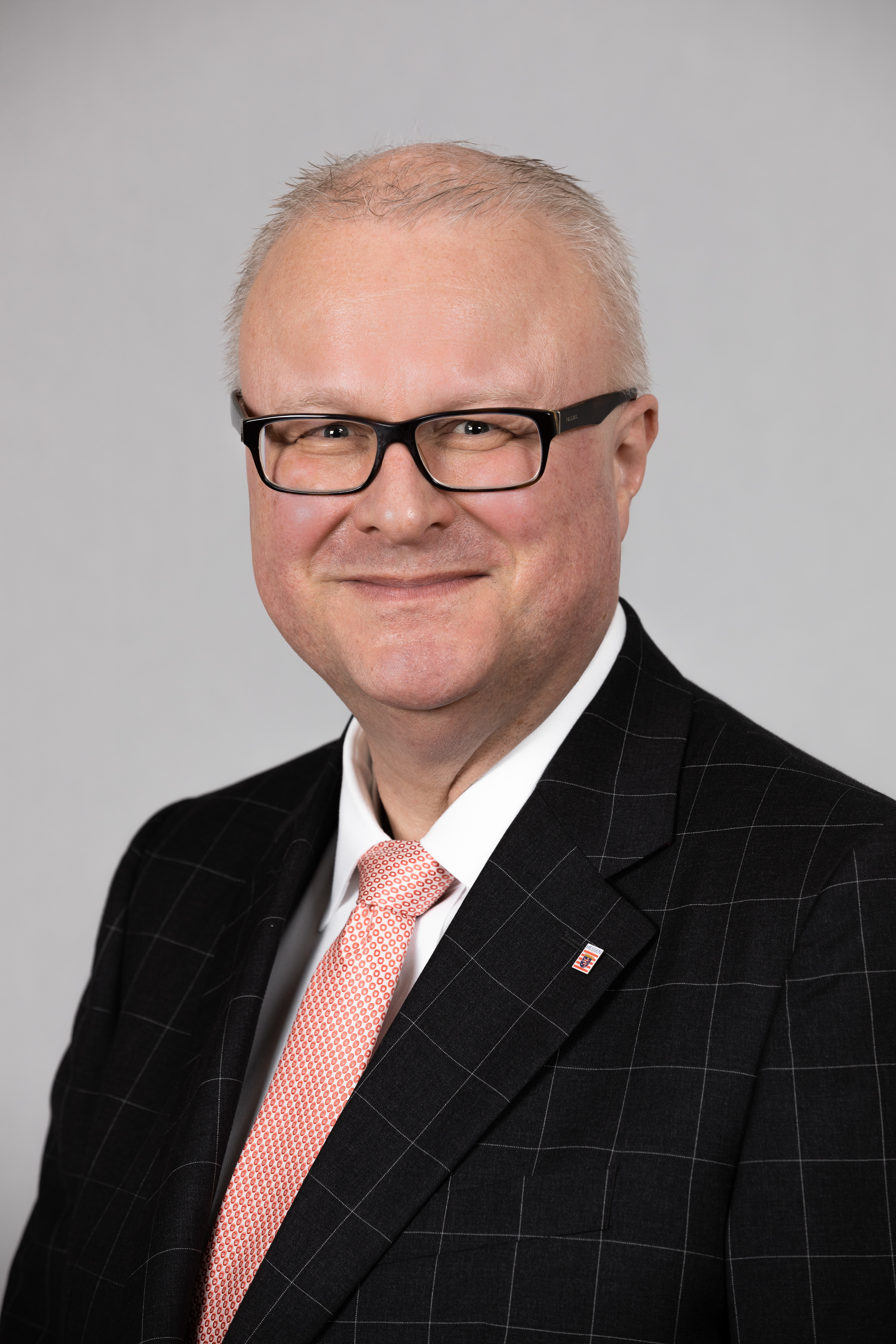
- Thomas Schäfer in 2019

Minister of Finance in Hesse
- In office 31 August 2010 – 28 March 2020
- Preceded by: Karlheinz Weimar
- Succeeded by: Michael Boddenberg

Personal details
- Born: 22 February 1966 Hemer, North Rhine-Westphalia, West Germany
- Died: 28 March 2020 (aged 54) Hochheim am Main, Hesse, Germany
- Party: CDU
- Education: University of Marburg
- Profession: Lawyer

Thomas Schäfer (German: [ˈtoːmas ˈʃɛːfɐ]; 22 February 1966 – 28 March 2020) was a German lawyer and politician for the Christian Democratic Union of Germany (CDU). He was Minister of Finance of Hesse between 2010 and 2020.

== Early life and education ==
Schäfer was born in Hemer and grew up in Biedenkopf. After completing the Abitur in 1985, he trained as a banker at the local savings bank. He studied law at the University of Marburg, graduating in 1997.

From 1995 to 1998, Schäfer taught private and public law at the Deutsche Angestellten-Akademie in Marburg. From 1998 onward he worked as a lawyer for the Commerzbank in Frankfurt am Main. In 1999, he earned a doctorate under the supervision of Werner Frotscher.

== Political career ==
in 1980, Schäfer joined the CDU/CSU youth organisation Junge Union and was a board member from 1985 to 1999. After the 1999 Hessian state election, Schäfer led the office of Christean Wagner, the minister of justice in Hesse, and from 2002 the office of Minister President Roland Koch. From November 2005 until 2009, he was secretary of state for Jürgen Banzer, minister of labour, family and health. During the 2008 financial crisis, he coordinated state efforts to rescue Opel, based in Rüsselsheim am Main, in conjunction with the other three states where Opel had plants. In February 2009, he became secretary of state for Karlheinz Weimar, the minister of finance.

In August 2010, Schäfer became Hesse's state minister of finance, the head of the Hessisches Ministerium der Finanzen, under the new minister president, Volker Bouffier. He was a member of the Hessischer Landtag, the state parliament, from 2014 onward. In 2018, he was re-elected, this time directly. He was regarded as a likely successor to Bouffier.

On 27 March 2020, he announced, together with the minister of economy, Tarek Al-Wazir, the state's financial help in the COVID-19 pandemic for freelancers and small businesses. Schäfer stated, "The fight against the Corona crisis will not fail because of money." ("Am Geld wird die Bekämpfung der Corona-Krise nicht scheitern.")

== Death ==
On the morning of 28 March 2020, his body was found next to the Cologne–Frankfurt high-speed rail line near Hochheim am Main, and police speculated that he had killed himself. Schäfer's death came "as a shock", as days prior he had expressed that his work was "a pleasure and an honour". He was known as a jovial man with good humor, though he had visibly lost weight for "some time". According to Bouffier, Schäfer was concerned about managing the financial response to the coronavirus pandemic. He was survived by his wife and two children. His successor as minister of finance is Michael Boddenberg.
