= Willi van Ooyen =

German politician

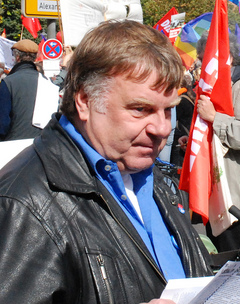
Van Ooyen in 2007

Willi van Ooyen (born 23 February 1947) is a German politician of the socialist Linke Party. He is a self-described Marxist.

== Life ==
Born in Weeze, Van Ooyen is the oldest of seven children. As a teenager he studied to be an electrician in the employ of the West-German Bundesbahn. He married in 1972, and moved to Frankfurt am Main where he studied history and education for a time at Johann Wolfgang Goethe University.

== Political career ==
In the mid-1960s when he was a teenager, van Ooyen started his lifelong affiliation with various far-left political groupings and causes. He was in the thick of the so-called '68 Generation.

In organized politics, his first major position was Hessian leader of the Marxist German Peace Union (Deutsche Friedensunion, DFU) as managing director—a partial successor of the banned Communist Party of Germany — in 1976. The GPU was always a minor party, and it changed its status to "political union" in 1984, the same year that Willi van Ooyen became federal leader of the party across the whole of West Germany. This organisation was mainly founded by East Germany.

He became affiliated with the new socialist party in Germany, Die Linke, in 2007, and was nominated as their candidate for minister-president in the 2008 Hessian state election. The Linke party won 5.1% of the vote and entered the Landtag.

The reason for the Hessian political crisis of 2008 (See Landtag of Hesse) was fundamentally the existence of the Linke bloc in the Landtag. Andrea Ypsilanti, leader of the SPD, had promised several times during the electoral campaign not to work together with the new leftist party Die Linke (The Left). A few weeks after election day, she was tempted to go for a SPD–Green coalition supported by The Left but under opposition from MP Dagmar Metzger (SPD) decided not to renege on her promise not to pursue such a venue. After a second unsuccessful attempt by Ypsilanti to take power, all parties agreed to dissolve the Landtag and call for early elections on 18 January 2009.

In the uproar in 2008, many German commentators played up the fact that the German Peace Union, of which vanOoyen was a longtime member and eventual federal leader, had been guided, advised, and financed by the East German communist government. The communist government had showered praise upon the German Peace Union while it still existed, and heavily funded it during the van Ooyen years and earlier. Van Ooyen defended his status as a beneficiary of communist funds in the 1970s–1980s by saying he was "naive".

He was again the Linke party's candidate for minister-president in the 2009 Landtag election in Hesse, where his party again won six seats.
