= Carmen Everts =

German civil servant (born 1968)

Carmen Everts (born 12 April 1968 in Wilhelmshaven) is a German politician, political scientist and civil servant, a former member of the Parliament of Hesse for the Social Democratic Party of Germany, and an expert on political extremism. In 2009, she was appointed by the government of Hesse as head of department at the Hessian State Agency for Civic Education, responsible for research on the communist dictatorship in East Germany and demographic research.

Everts studied law and political science, and earned a doctoral degree in political science in 1999. In her doctoral thesis, she analyzed political extremism in the far-right party Die Republikaner (REP) and the far-left party Partei des Demokratischen Sozialismus (PDS, now Die Linke). Her doctoral supervisor was Eckhard Jesse.

Carmen Everts has been a member of the SPD since 1989, and was chair of the local party in Kreis Groß-Gerau from 2003 to 2008. She was employed by the SPD in Hesse from 1999 until her election to parliament, from 2003 as a scientific adviser to the parliamentary group of the SPD.

In the 2008 Hesse state election, she was elected to the Parliament of Hesse.

On 3 November 2008, Everts declared, together with fellow MPs Silke Tesch, Jürgen Walter and Dagmar Metzger, that she would not support Andrea Ypsilanti as Prime Minister of Hesse, in a planned election. Ypsilanti, chair of SPD in Hesse, was supposed to form a government with support of the leftist extremist party Die Linke, the successor of the East German communist party. Everts stated her decision was based on her aversion to the party Die Linke, which she said has "extremist" elements. She has criticized the party Die Linke of having a "divided, negative attitude towards democracy and the rule of law". Without the support of her parliamentary group, Ypsilanti gave up her bid to become Prime Minister, leading to new elections in 2009.

Carmen Everts did not run for another term as a member of parliament in the 2009 election. She returned to her job as a scientific adviser to the SPD parliamentary group, before she was appointed as head of department at the Hessian State Agency for Civic Education in 2009.

Everts went to school with Jürgen Walter, the former vice chair of SPD in Hesse.

In 2010, she left the SPD.

== Publications ==
- Politischer Extremismus. Theorie und Analyse am Beispiel der Parteien REP und PDS. Weißensee-Verlag, Berlin 2000, ISBN 3-934479-24-3
