= Thorsten Schäfer-Gümbel =

German politician (born 1969)

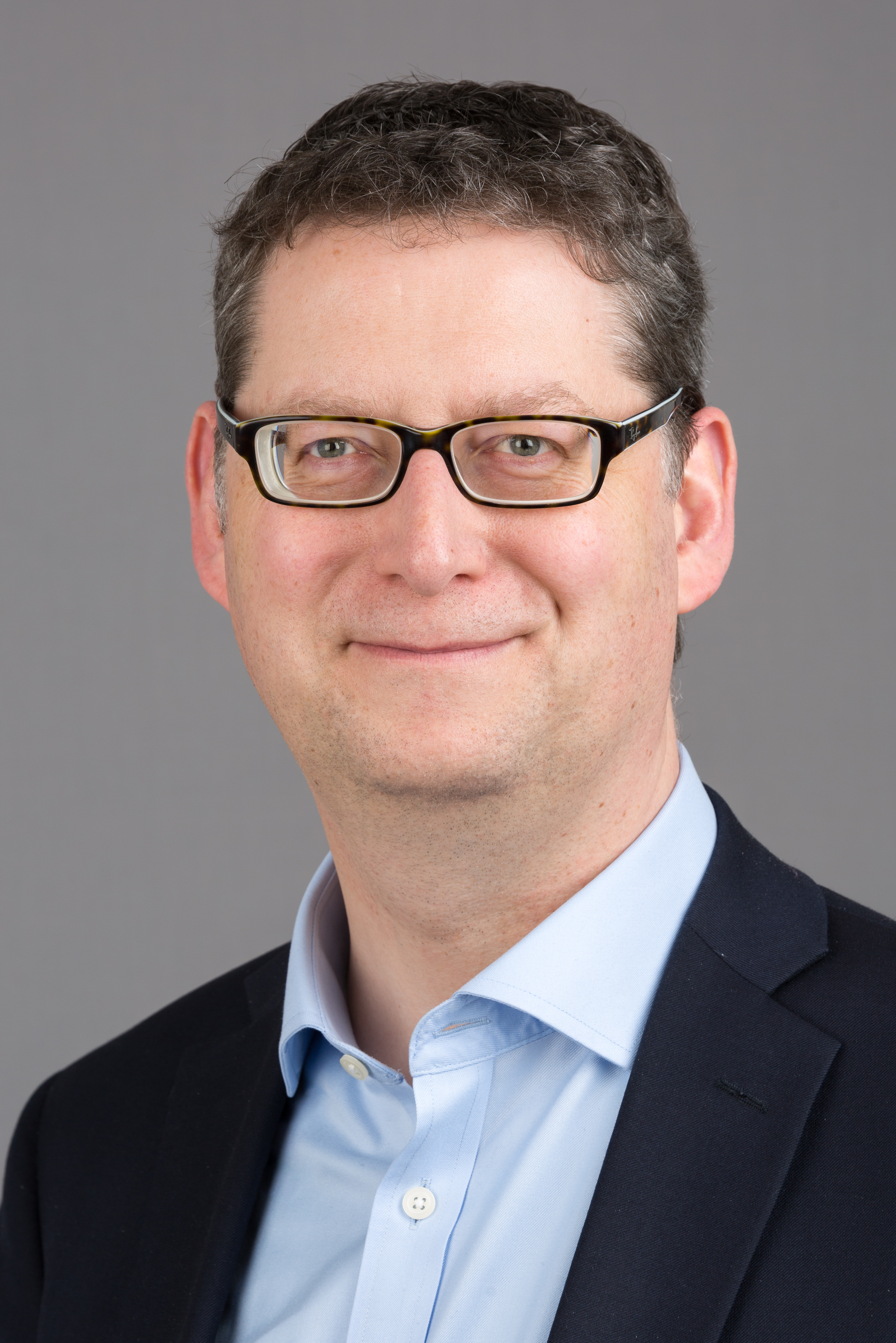
- Schäfer-Gümbel in 2020

Leader of the Social Democratic Party Acting
- In office 3 June 2019 – 1 October 2019 Serving with Malu Dreyer and Manuela Schwesig
- General Secretary: Lars Klingbeil
- Preceded by: Andrea Nahles
- Succeeded by: Saskia Esken and Norbert Walter-Borjans

Leader of the Social Democratic Party in Hesse
- In office 28 February 2009 – 1 October 2019
- Preceded by: Andrea Ypsilanti
- Succeeded by: Nancy Faeser

Deputy Leader of the Social Democratic Party
- In office 14 November 2009 – 1 October 2019 Serving with Ralf Stegner, Manuela Schwesig, Malu Dreyer, Natascha Kohnen and Olaf Scholz
- Leader: Sigmar Gabriel; Martin Schulz; Andrea Nahles
- Preceded by: Andrea Nahles
- Succeeded by: Kevin Kühnert

Member of the Hessian Landtag
- In office 5 April 2003 – 1 October 2019
- Succeeded by: Nadine Gersberg

Personal details
- Born: 1 October 1969 (age 56) Oberstdorf, West Germany
- Party: SPD

Thorsten Schäfer-Gümbel (né Schäfer; born 1 October 1969) is a former German politician of the Social Democratic Party (SPD) who has been serving as member of the management board of GIZ since 2019.

Schäfer-Gümbel notably was the leader of the opposition SPD party bloc in the Hessian state parliament. He lost his bid for the office of Minister-President of Hesse in the January 2009 Hessian state election, where he had challenged incumbent Roland Koch (CDU). Schäfer-Gümbel served as deputy leader of the SPD from December 2013. He was one of three ad interim successors of former SPD leader Andrea Nahles in the transition phase.

== Early life and education ==
Schäfer-Gümbel was born to a West German soldier stationed in southern Bavaria, in Oberstdorf. However, he grew up in Gießen (Hesse). He briefly studied Agrarian Science at Justus-Liebig-University Gießen, after which he changed to Political Science. Supported by a scholarship of the Friedrich Ebert Foundation, he graduated with a Master's degree in 1997, he took various minor political positions.

== Career ==
Schäfer-Gümbel was involved with the Social and Youth department of Gießen from the late 1990s. He became a local adviser to the SPD, a party which he had joined at the age of 17, and was also a local delegate of the SPD in the local government (Kreistag) in Gießen. He quickly moved up the ranks in the Hessian SPD party machine, and was a candidate on the SPD party list during the 2003 Landtag election. He gained a seat in 2003, and has been a member of the Hessian Landtag ever since. He was re-elected in the 2008 Landtag election and in the 2009 special election; however he was elected as part of the party list and not on a direct mandate, as he lost his local race to the CDU candidate.

In late 2008, following a political crisis and Andrea Ypsilanti's resignation, Schäfer-Gümbel became the SPD's party leader in Hesse and the SPD candidate for minister-president of Hesse. However, the SPD fared poorly in the subsequent 2009 special election, which allowed the CDU's Roland Koch to remain in office. Schäfer-Gümbel was the party leader of the opposition SPD from 29 January 2009.

Schäfer-Gümbel was a delegate to the Federal Convention for the purpose of electing the President of Germany in 2009, 2010, 2012 and 2017. He co-chaired the SPD's national conventions in Berlin (2011) Hanover (2012) and Augsburg (2013).

In the negotiations to form a Grand Coalition of Chancellor Angela Merkel's Christian Democrats (CDU together with the Bavarian CSU) and the SPD following the 2013 federal elections, Schäfer-Gümbel was part of the SPD delegation in the working group on energy policy, led by Peter Altmaier and Hannelore Kraft.

In March 2019, Schäfer-Gümbel announced that he would resign from active politics by the end of the year and instead join the management board of German development agency GIZ. He had been appointed for the job by Andrea Nahles and kept it until his promotion to GIZ Speaker of the Board in 2022.

== Personal life ==
Schäfer-Gümbel is married and has three children.

== Other activities ==
=== Corporate boards ===
- Helaba, Member of the Supervisory Board (since 2009)
- SV SparkassenVersicherung, Member of the Advisory Board (since 2015)

=== Non-profit organizations ===
- Business Forum of the Social Democratic Party of Germany, Member of the Political Advisory Board (since 2018)
- Friedrich Ebert Foundation (FES), Member
- Friends of the University of Giessen, Member of the Governing Board
- Skyliners Frankfurt, Member of the Board of Trustees (since 2015)
- Rheingau Musik Festival, Member of the Board of Trustees (since 2012)
- Neue Gesellschaft/Frankfurter Hefte, Member of the Advisory Board (since 2011)
- Protestant Church in Hesse and Nassau, Member of the Synod (since 2010)
- Hessischer Rundfunk, Member of the Broadcasting Council
- German United Services Trade Union (ver.di), Member
- Avicenna Award, Member of the Advisory Board (2006-2009)
