= Jürgen Lenders =

German politician (born 1966)

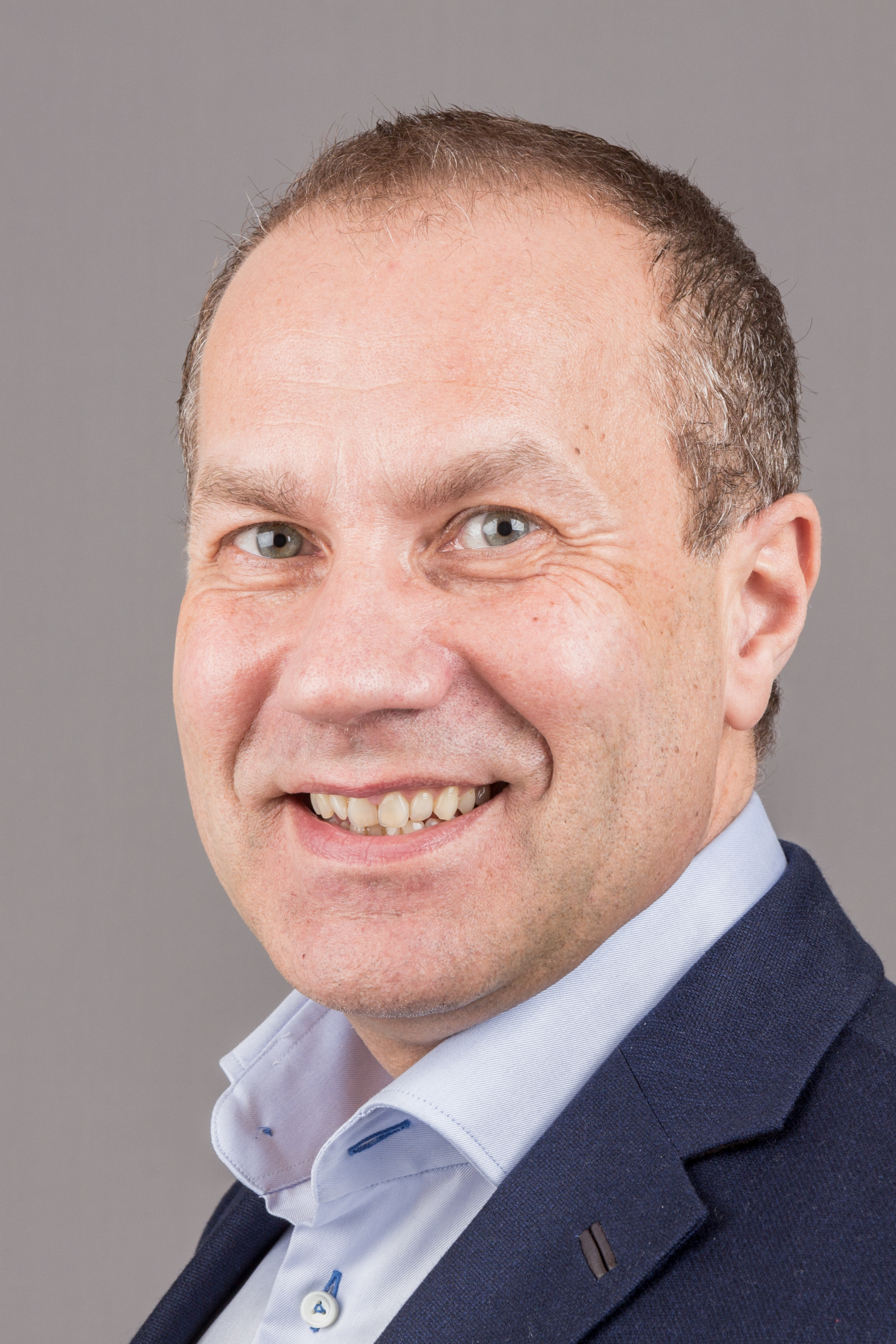

Member of the Bundestag
- In office 2021–2025

Personal details
- Born: 20 April 1966 (age 60) Krefeld
- Party: FDP

Jürgen Lenders (born 20 April 1966 in Krefeld, North Rhine-Westphalia) is a German politician for the FDP and has been a member of the German Bundestag, the federal parliament, from 2021 to 2025. He was a member of the state parliament of Hessen from 2008 to 2021.

== Education and profession ==
After graduating from secondary school, Lenders trained as a tradesman in the electrical trade. Following his military service, he returned to his old company and later worked as head of purchasing for a shopfitting company. In 1994, he started his own business.

== Political career ==
Lenders has been a member of the FDP since 1995 holding various board positions. Lenders is the founding chairman of the district association of the Young Liberals (JuLis) and has been the district chairman of the FDP in the Fulda district since 1997. From 2001 to 2005 he was a member of the FDP state executive committee. Since 2010, he has been the chairman of the FDP district association for northern and eastern Hessen. Lenders was a local councillor in the Fulda city parliament from 2003 to 2011, leading the FDP parliamentary group from 2004 to 2011. In the 2008 Hessian state elections on 27 January 2008, Jürgen Lenders became a member of the Hessen state parliament and was economic policy spokesman and treasurer of the FDP state parliamentary group. In the 2013 Hessian state elections, he stood in the constituency of Fulda I, as before in 1999, 2003, 2008 and 2009 when he was defeated in each case by Walter Arnold (CDU). However, on this occasion he succeeded in re-entering the state parliament via a party list position. He again became economic policy spokesman, transport policy spokesman and deputy parliamentary group chairman. He also ran in the 2018 Hessian state election in the constituency of Fulda I, this time losing to the new CDU candidate Thomas Hering. From 2015 to 2021, he was parliamentary manager of the FDP parliamentary group. He is a member of the Main Committee and deputy member of the Investigation Committee 20/1 (Dr. Walter Lübcke) since June 30, 2020.

At the federal level, Lenders is an assessor on the federal executive committee of the Liberal Gays and Lesbians (LiSL) and head of the working group Economy, small and medium-sized businesses and tourism of the parliamentary group conference.

=== Member of the German Parliament, 2021–2025 ===
Lenders was elected to the Bundestag in the 2021 German federal election, gaining a seat in the Bundestag via a list mandate. Subsequently he resigned from his state parliament mandate opening the way for his successor Lisa Deißler. 2021.

In parliament, Lenders served as a member of the Transport Committee.

In September 2024, Lenders announced that he would not stand in the 2025 federal elections but instead resign from active politics by the end of the parliamentary term.

== Other activities ==
From 1998 to 2011, Lenders was the 1st Chairman of the Fulda City Marketing Association Fulda and is now Honorary Chairman. From 2002 to 2011, Jürgen Lenders was an honorary judge at the Social Court of Fulda.

== Personal life ==
Lenders has lived in a registered civil partnership since 2010.
