= Silke Tesch =

German politician

Silke Tesch (born 5 July 1958 in Dautphetal-Holzhausen) is a German politician and a former member of the Parliament of Hesse for the Social Democratic Party of Germany (SPD).

On 5 April 2003, she was elected to the Parliament of Hesse. She was a member of the Bundesversammlung in 2004.

She was reelected to Parliament in the 2008 Hesse state election. On 3 November 2008, however, she declared, together with fellow SPD MPs Carmen Everts, Jürgen Walter and Dagmar Metzger, that she would not support Andrea Ypsilanti as Prime Minister of Hesse, in a planned election. Ypsilanti, chair of SPD in Hesse, was supposed to form a government with support of the leftist extremist (according to the Verfassungsschutz) party Die Linke, the successor of the Socialist Unity Party of Germany (SED). The SPD party had, before the election, vowed not under any circumstances to cooperate with Die Linke.

Without the support of her party, Silke Tesch could not run for another term as a member of parliament in the 2009 election.
