= Banzer (surname) =

Banzer is a surname. Notable people with the surname include:

- Bruno Banzer (born 1947), Swiss artistic gymnast
- Hugo Banzer (1926–2002), Bolivian politician
- Jürgen Banzer (born 1955), German politician
- Michelle Banzer (fl. 2000s), winner of Miss Kentucky USA 2007
