= Kaweh Mansoori =

German politician

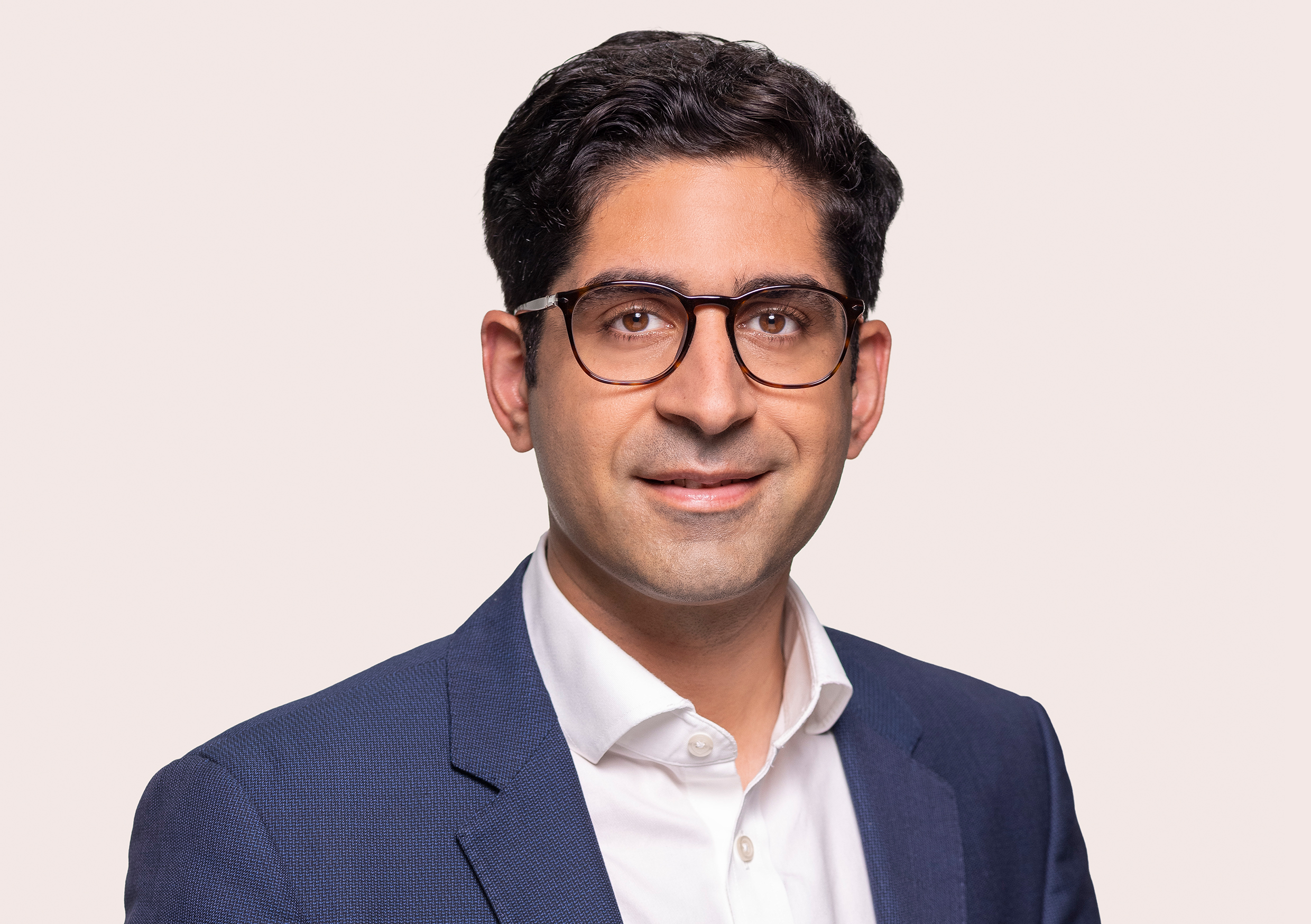

State Minister for Economic Affairs, Energy, Transport and Regional Development of Hesse
- Incumbent
- Assumed office 2024
- Minister-President: Boris Rhein
- Preceded by: Tarek Al-Wazir

Member of the Bundestag
- Incumbent
- Assumed office 2021

Personal details
- Born: 12 August 1988 (age 38) Gießen, West Germany (now Germany)
- Citizenship: German
- Party: SPD
- Education: University of Giessen

Kaweh Mansoori (born 12 August 1988) is a German lawyer and politician of the Social Democratic Party (SPD) who has been serving as State Minister of Economic Affairs, Energy, Transport and Housing in the government of Minister-President Boris Rhein of Hesse since 2024. From 2021 to 2023, he was a member of the Bundestag.

== Early life and education ==
Mansoori was born 1988 in the West German city of Gießen. He studied law at University of Giessen.

== Political career ==
=== Member of the German Parliament, 2021–2024 ===
Mansoori became member of the Bundestag in the 2021 federal elections, representing the Frankfurt am Main II district. In the negotiations to form a coalition government between the SPD, the Green Party and Free Democratic Party (FDP) following the elections, he was part of his party's delegation in the working group on equality, co-chaired by Petra Köpping, Ricarda Lang and Herbert Mertin.

In parliament, Mansoori served on the Committee on Labour and Social Affairs and the Committee on Legal Affairs.

Within his parliamentary group, Mansoori belonged to the Parliamentary Left, a left-wing movement.

=== Career in state government ===
In the negotiations to form a coalition government of the Christian Democratic Union (CDU) and the SPD following the 2023 state elections in Hesse, Mansoori was part of his party's delegation.

In the negotiations to form a Grand Coalition under the leadership of Friedrich Merz's Christian Democrats (CDU together with the Bavarian CSU) and the SPD following the 2025 German elections, Mansoori was part of the SPD delegation in the working group on economic affairs, industry and tourism, led by Jens Spahn, Hansjörg Durz and Alexander Schweitzer.

== Other activities ==
- Education and Science Workers' Union (GEW), Member
- German United Services Trade Union (ver.di), Member

== Personal life ==
Kaweh Mansoori and his partner, Josefine Koebe, a member of the Landtag of Hesse, have a son who was born in September 2026.
