= Tarek Al-Wazir =

German politician (born 1971)

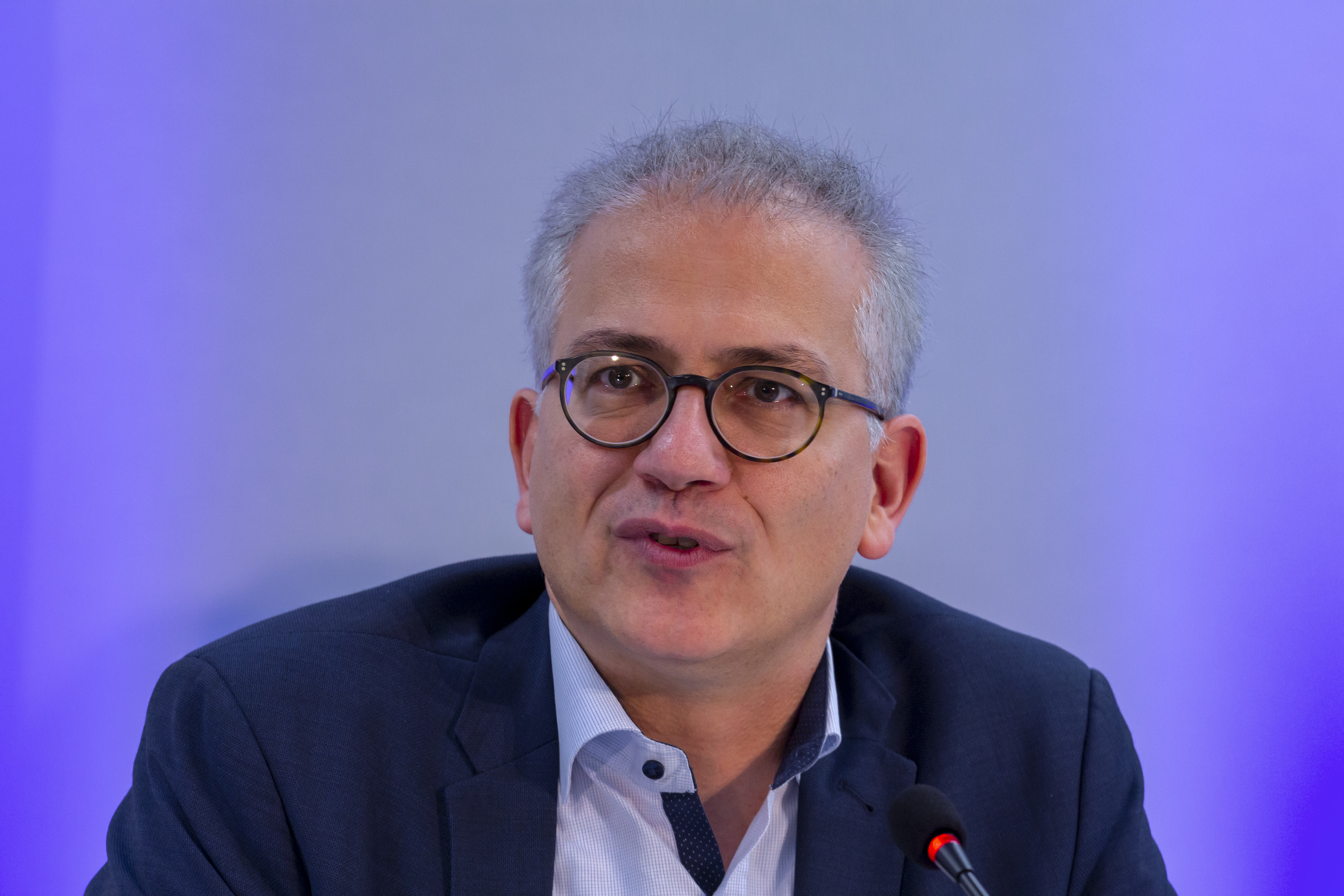
- Al-Wazir in 2019

Deputy Minister-President of Hesse
- In office 18 January 2014 – 18 January 2024
- Minister-President: Volker Bouffier; Boris Rhein
- Preceded by: Jörg-Uwe Hahn
- Succeeded by: Kaweh Mansoori

Minister for Economics, Energy, Transport and Housing of Hesse
- In office 18 January 2014 – 18 January 2024
- Minister-President: Volker Bouffier; Boris Rhein
- Preceded by: Florian Rentsch
- Succeeded by: Kaweh Mansoori

Member of the Bundestag for Hesse
- Incumbent
- Assumed office 25 March 2025
- Constituency: The Greens Party List

Member of the Landtag of Hesse
- In office 28 October 2018 – 25 March 2025
- Succeeded by: Andreas Ewald
- Constituency: Offenbach
- In office 19 February 1995 – 16 October 2017
- Constituency: Offenbach

Personal details
- Born: 3 January 1971 (age 55) Offenbach am Main, Hesse, West Germany
- Citizenship: Germany; Yemen
- Party: The Greens (since 1989)
- Children: 2
- Relatives: Abdullah al-Wazir (great-uncle)
- Education: Goethe University Frankfurt

Tarek Mohammed Al-Wazir (Arabic: طارق محمد الوزير; born 3 January 1971) is a German politician of Alliance '90/The Greens who has been serving as a member of the Bundestag since the 2025 elections, representing the Offenbach electoral district.

Prior to entering national politics, Al-Wazir served as deputy to the Hessian Minister-President, and Hessian Minister of Economics, Energy, Transport and Regional Development from 2014 to 2024. He was a member of the Landtag of Hesse and as co-chair of the Hesse's Green Party.

== Early life and education ==
Al-Wazir was born in Offenbach am Main, Hesse, the son of an upper-class Yemeni father and a teacher. He holds dual citizenship of Yemen and Germany. His parents divorced while he was a child, and he spent several years of his youth in the Yemeni capital (Sana'a) with his father, an experience he later described as very influential in his personal development.

After his Abitur in 1991, Al-Wazir studied political science in Frankfurt, where he earned a degree.

== Personal life ==
Al-Wazir is married to a Yemeni woman, with whom he has two sons. They also split time between Germany and Yemen.

Al-Wazir's surname has been an aptronym since he assumed ministerial office in 2014, as الوزير "al-wazīr" is Arabic for "the government minister."

== Political career ==
Al-Wazir joined the German Green Party in 1989, and has been a member ever since. From 1992 to 1994 he was chair of the party's youth organisation (Green Youth) in Hesse. He has been a member of the Landtag since 1995 and served as co-chair of the Hessian Green Party (with Kordula Schulz-Asche).

Al-Wazir was the leader of the Greens during the Hesse state election of 2008, and as such was the Green candidate for the position of Minister-President of Hesse. His party gained 7.5% of the votes. In the aftermath of the election, he pushed hard for a "red–green–red" coalition consisting of the Social Democratic Party (SPD), the Greens, and Die Linke. This would have succeeded if not for an internal revolt by SPD members, forcing a new election in January 2009. In the 2009 elections, he again stood as the Green candidate for minister-president. Surveys showed Al-Wazir to be Hesse's most popular politician at the time of the vote. This time his party, also benefitting from popular anger at the SPD, increased its share to 13.7% of the vote, but the Greens remained out of government.

On 18 January 2014, after the 2013 state elections, Al-Wazir became Deputy of the Hessian Minister-President Volker Bouffier and Hessian Minister of Economics, Energy, Transport and Regional Development in a Black-Green coalition. Thus they formed only the third CDU-Green government in Germany's 16 federal states and the first in a big and socially diverse region. As one of Hesse's representatives at the Bundesrat, Al-Wazir was a member of the Committee on Economic Affairs and the Committee on Transport.

Al-Wazir was a Green Party delegate to the Federal Convention for electing the president of Germany in 2017.

In the negotiations to form a so-called traffic light coalition of the Social Democratic Party (SPD), the Green Party and the Free Democratic Party (FDP) following the 2021 German elections, Al-Wazir was part of his party's delegation in the working group on mobility, co-chaired by Anke Rehlinger, Anton Hofreiter and Oliver Luksic.

=== Member of the German Parliament, 2025–present ===
In the 2025 German federal election, Al-Wazir was the Green direct candidate in Offenbach and 4th place on the state list.

== Other activities (selection) ==
=== Regulatory agencies ===
- Federal Network Agency for Electricity, Gas, Telecommunications, Post and Railway (BNetzA), member of the Advisory Board

=== Corporate boards ===
- Helaba, alternate member of the supervisory board
- HA Hessen Agentur GmbH, chair of the supervisory board
- Messe Frankfurt, member of the supervisory board
- Wirtschafts- und Infrastrukturbank Hessen (WIBank), chair of the advisory board

=== Non-profit organizations ===
- Hessischer Rundfunk, member of the broadcasting council
- Frankfurt Main Finance, member of the presidium
- Rheingau Musik Festival, Member of the Board of trustees
- Stiftung Schloss Ettersburg, member of the board of trustees
