= Jürgen Walter (politician) =

German lawyer and politician

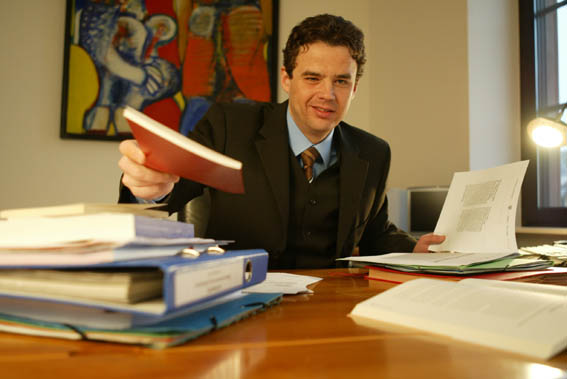
Jürgen Walter.

Jürgen Walter (born 23 August 1968 in Jugenheim) is a German lawyer and politician, and a former member of the Parliament of Hesse for the Social Democratic Party of Germany (SPD).

He completed his law studies in 1996, and has since worked as an attorney. Walter became a member of the SPD in 1987, and was chairman of Jusos in Hesse from 1996 to 1999. He was a member of the city council of Gernsheim from 1993 to 2002. Jürgen Walter is a member of the Netzwerk Hessen, which together with the Netzwerk Berlin strongly supported the policies of Chancellor Gerhard Schröder.

In 1999, Walter was elected to the Parliament of Hesse. Until 2003, he was Secretary General of SPD Hesse, and from 2003 until November 2008, he was vice chairman of SPD Hesse. From February 2003 to January 2008, he was chairman of the SPD parliamentary faction in the Hessian parliament.

In August 2006, he was a candidate for the nomination as top candidate (and Prime Minister candidate) of SPD in Hesse. He received 165 votes, while leftist Andrea Ypsilanti received 175 votes.

On 3 November 2008, he declared, together with fellow SPD MPs Carmen Everts, Silke Tesch and Dagmar Metzger, that he would not support Andrea Ypsilanti as Prime Minister of Hesse, in a planned election. Ypsilanti, chair of SPD in Hesse, was supposed to form a government with support of the leftist Die Linke. The SPD party had, before the election, vowed not under any circumstances to cooperate with Die Linke.

Without the support of his party, Jürgen Walter could not run for another term as a member of parliament in the 2009 election.
