= Josefine Koebe =

German politician (SPD) and economist

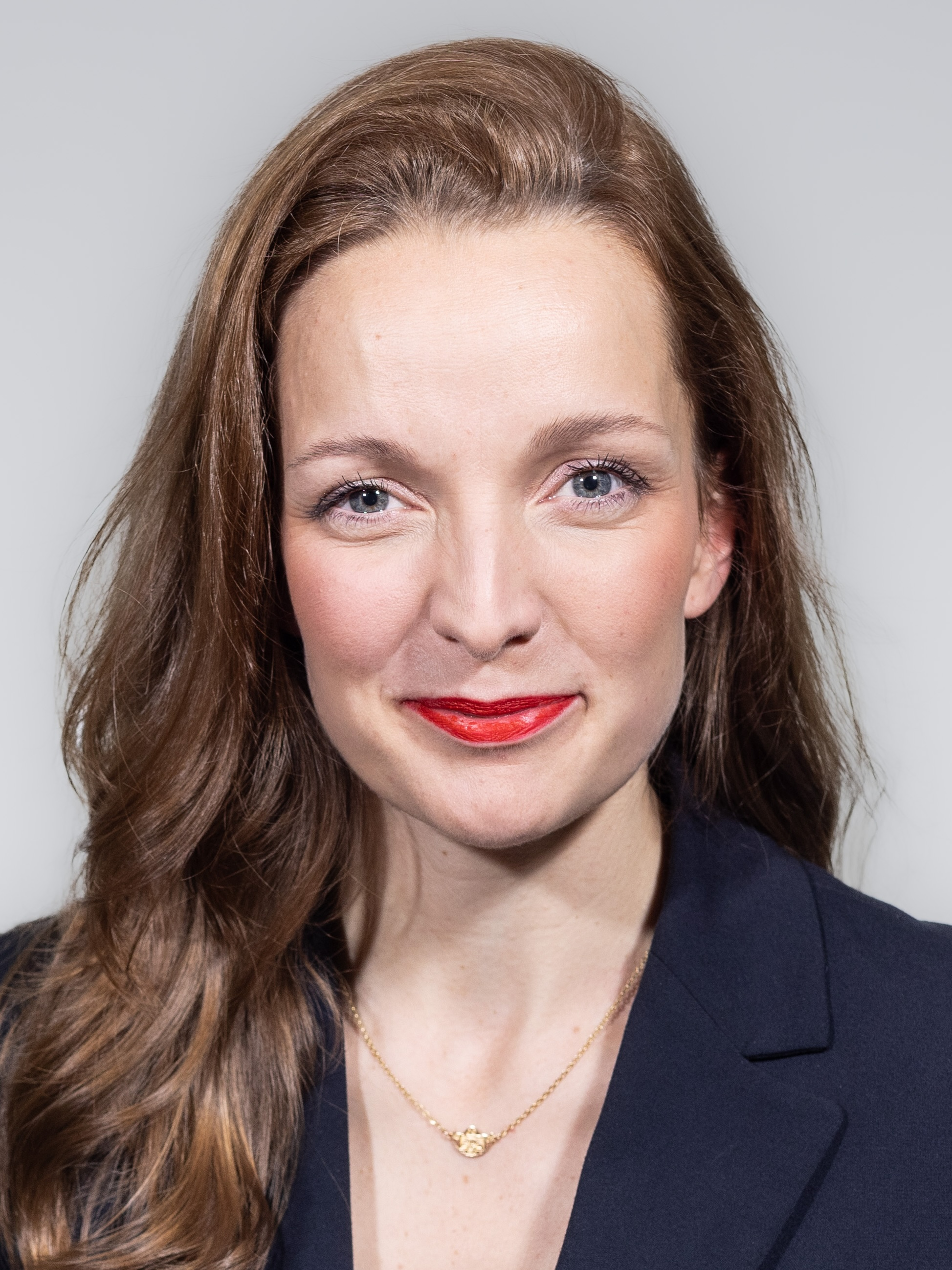
Josefine Koebe (2024)

Josefine Koebe (German: [jozeˈfiːnə ˈkøːbə]; born 3 July 1988) is a German economist and politician of the Social Democratic Party (SPD) who has been serving as a member of the State Parliament of Hesse since 2024. She is also the Secretary General of the SPD in Hesse.

== Early life and education ==
Koebe was born in Bensheim where she attended the Altes Kurfürstliches Gymnasium and graduated in 2007. She then studied International Economics at Tübingen and spent a two-semester exchange programme at Sciences Po Paris. After completing her bachelor's degree in 2012, she studied at HU Berlin in the Master's programme Economics and finished it in 2015. From March 2015 to October 2017, Koebe worked as deputy head of the parliamentary office of the then Erste Parlamentarische Geschäftsführerin (Chief Whip) of the SPD parliamentary group, Christine Lambrecht.

Koebe then began doctoral studies at the Universität Hamburg and was awarded her PhD in 2023 with a thesis on "Unintended Yet Effective: Evidence from Policy Reforms in Early Childhood Education and Care, Education and Environmental Economics". From January 2018 to December 2021, as part of her doctorate, she was a research assistant in the Education and Family Division at the Deutsche Institut für Wirtschaftsforschung (DIW) in Berlin.

== Early career ==
From October 2021 to March 2024, Koebe managed research collaborations in early education and the company's research and university network for Fröbel Bildung und Erziehung gGmbH.

== Political career ==
=== Early beginnings in Berlin and Hesse ===
Koebe has been a member of the SPD since 2013. Among other things, she was a member of the district executive Tempelhof-Schöneberg of the Berlin SPD for several years, the state executive of the Arbeitsgemeinschaft Sozialdemokratischer Frauen (Association of Social Democratic Women, ASF) Berlin and in the state committee for youth, education and family of the Berlin SPD.

In 2021, she was elected to the governing body (Magistrat) of the city of Bensheim as an honorary alderwoman (Stadträtin). She was elected deputy chair of the local SPD association the same year. In the Bergstraße SPD county association, she was elected deputy chairperson on 6 November 2021 at the party congress in Wald-Michelbach and also chairperson of the ASF in the same year. She has been a member of the state board of the Sozialdemokratische Gemeinschaft für Kommunalpolitik (Social Democratic Community for Local Politics, SGK Hesse) since July 2023. On 2 September 2023, she was elected to the executive committee of the SPD district of Southern Hesse at the party congress in Offenbach.

Due to her election to the state parliament, she resigned from the Bensheim municipal governing body in December 2023. Due to her responsibilities in state politics, she declined to run again for deputy chair of the Bensheim SPD association in 2025, but she remains a member of the executive committee.

=== Career in state politics ===
In the 2023 Hessian state election, Koebe stood as a candidate in the Bergstraße II constituency and was elected to the Landtag of Hesse, which was constituted in January 2024, via the SPD state list.

Koebe was elected as the deputy chair of the Budget Committee. Additionally, she serves as the spokesperson for early childhood education for the SPD parliamentary group and is a member of the Subcommittee on Financial Controlling and Administrative Management, as well as a deputy member of the State Youth Welfare Committee, the Administrative Committee of the Staatstheater Darmstadt, and the Investigation Committee 21/1 (COVID-19). At the beginning of the legislative period, she was a member of the Committee on Science and Culture for several months.

Since 2024, Koebe has been a member of the Board of Administration as a representative of the State of Hesse, Deputy Chairwoman of the Risk and Credit Committee and a member of the WI-Bank Committee of Landesbank Hessen-Thüringen (Helaba).

=== Secretary General of the SPD Hesse, 2024–present ===
On 9 March 2024, Koebe was elected Secretary General of the Hessian SPD at the party conference in Frankfurt am Main, serving under the leadership of chairman Sören Bartol.

== Personal life ==
Josefine Koebe has five children, including a son born in September 2026 to her and her partner, Kaweh Mansoori, Hesse's minister for economic affairs.

== Links ==
- Website of Dr. Josefine Koebe, MdL
