= Nadine Gersberg =

German politician (born 1977)

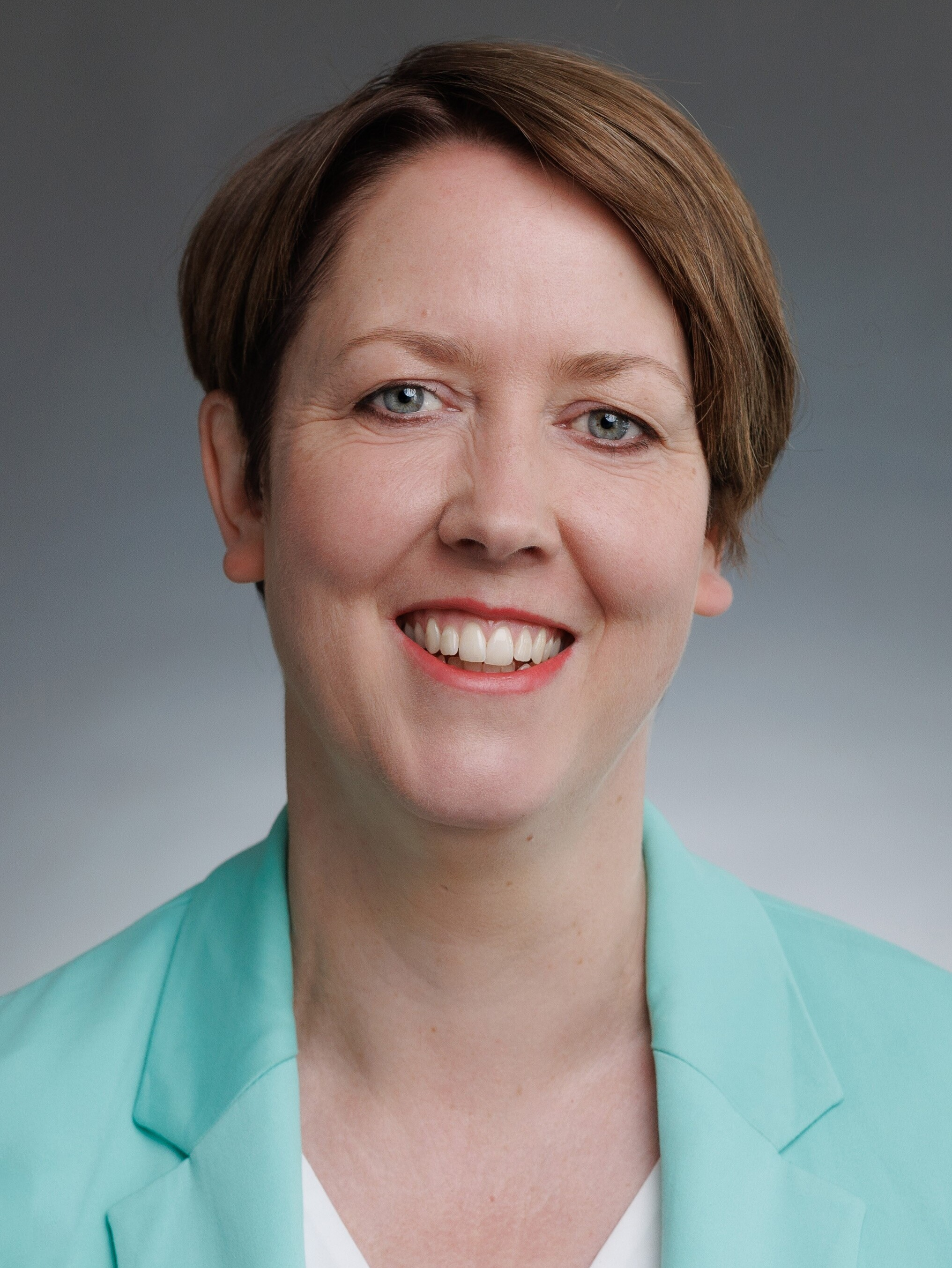
- Gersberg in 2022

Member of the Landtag of Hesse
- Incumbent
- Assumed office 4 September 2019
- Preceded by: Thorsten Schäfer-Gümbel

Personal details
- Born: 29 July 1977 (age 48)
- Party: Social Democratic Party (since 2002)

Nadine Gersberg (born 29 July 1977) is a German politician serving as a member of the Landtag of Hesse since 2019. She is the deputy chairwoman of the Social Democratic Party in Offenbach am Main.
