= Andreas Ewald =

German politician (born 1988)

Member of the Landtag of Hesse
- Incumbent
- Assumed office 6 April 2025
- Preceded by: Tarek Al-Wazir

Personal details
- Born: 27 November 1988 (age 37)
- Party: Alliance 90/The Greens (since 2014)

Andreas Ewald (born 27 November 1988) is a German politician serving as a member of the Landtag of Hesse since 2025. From 2024 to 2025, he served as co-chairman of Alliance 90/The Greens in Hesse.
