= 2009 Hessian state election =

State election in Hesse, Germany

2009 Hesse state election
| ← 2008 | 18 January 2009 | 2013 → |

All 118 seats of the Landtag of Hesse 60 seats needed for a majority
- Turnout: 2,591,872 (61.0%) ▼3.3%
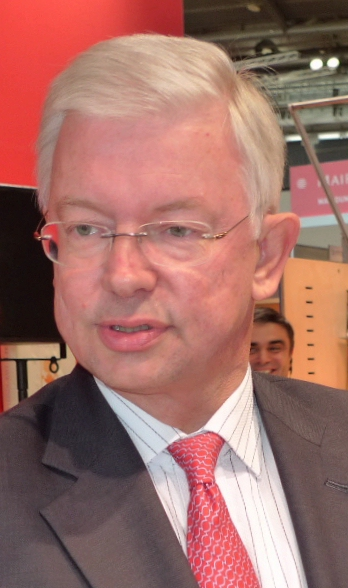

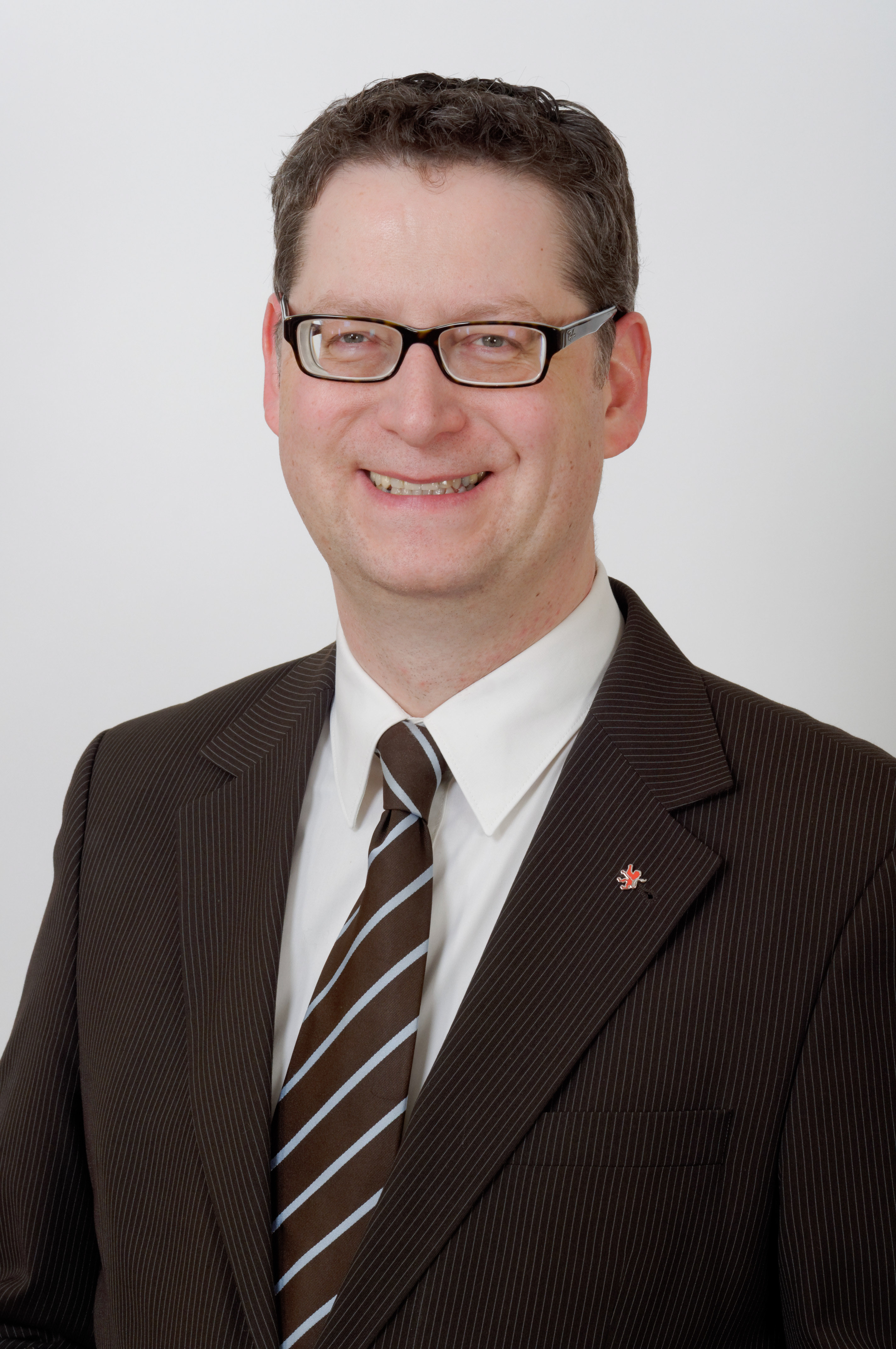

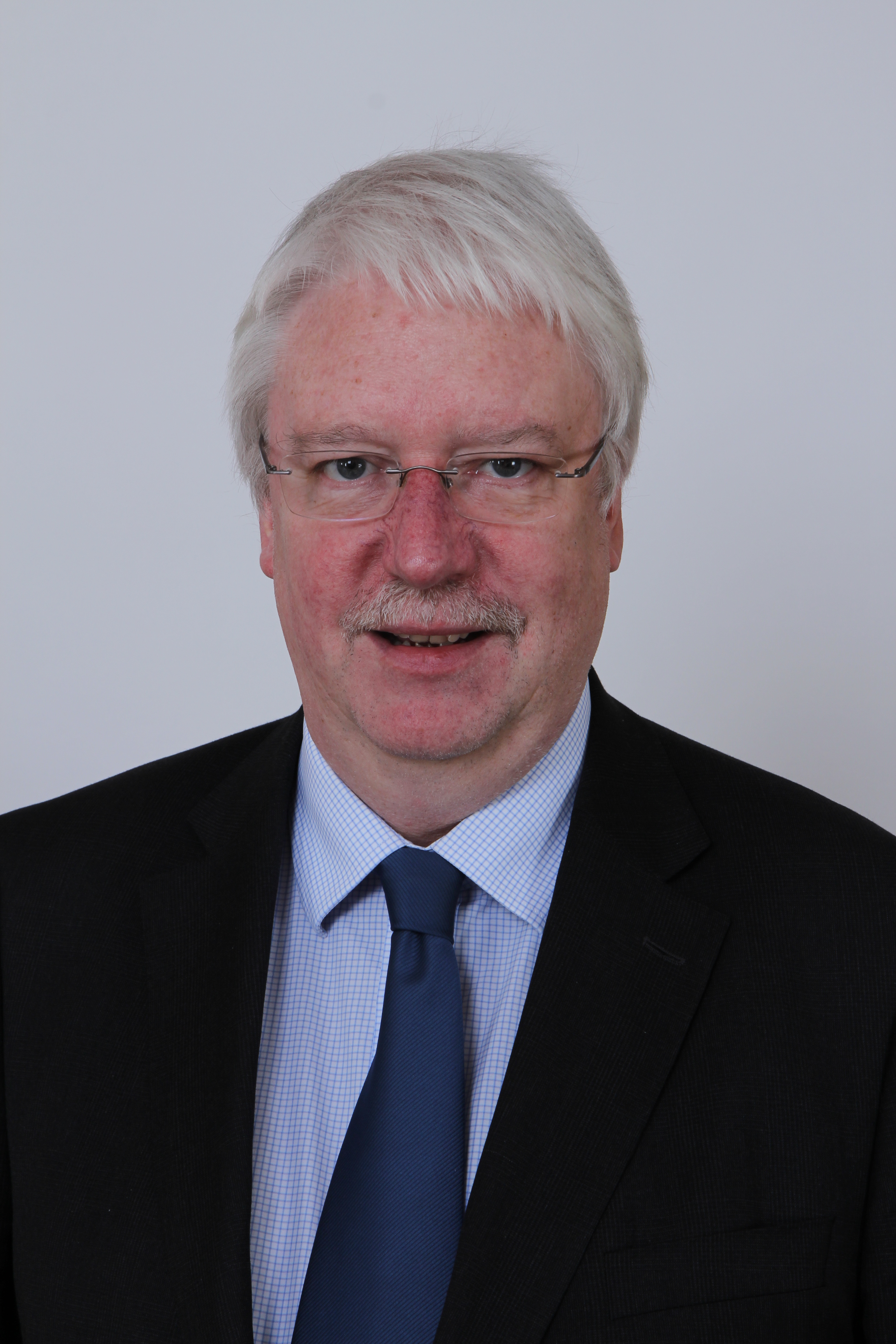

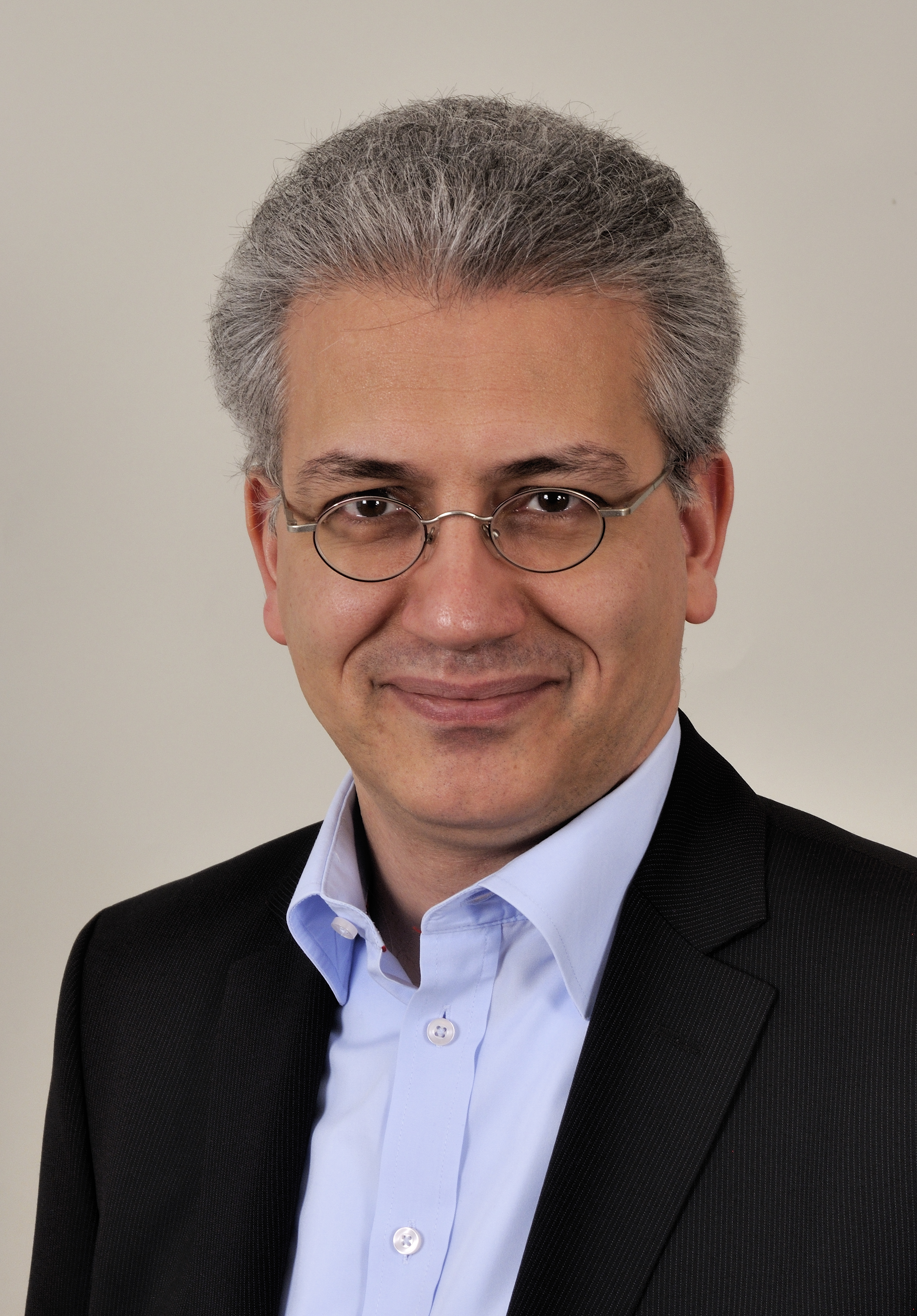

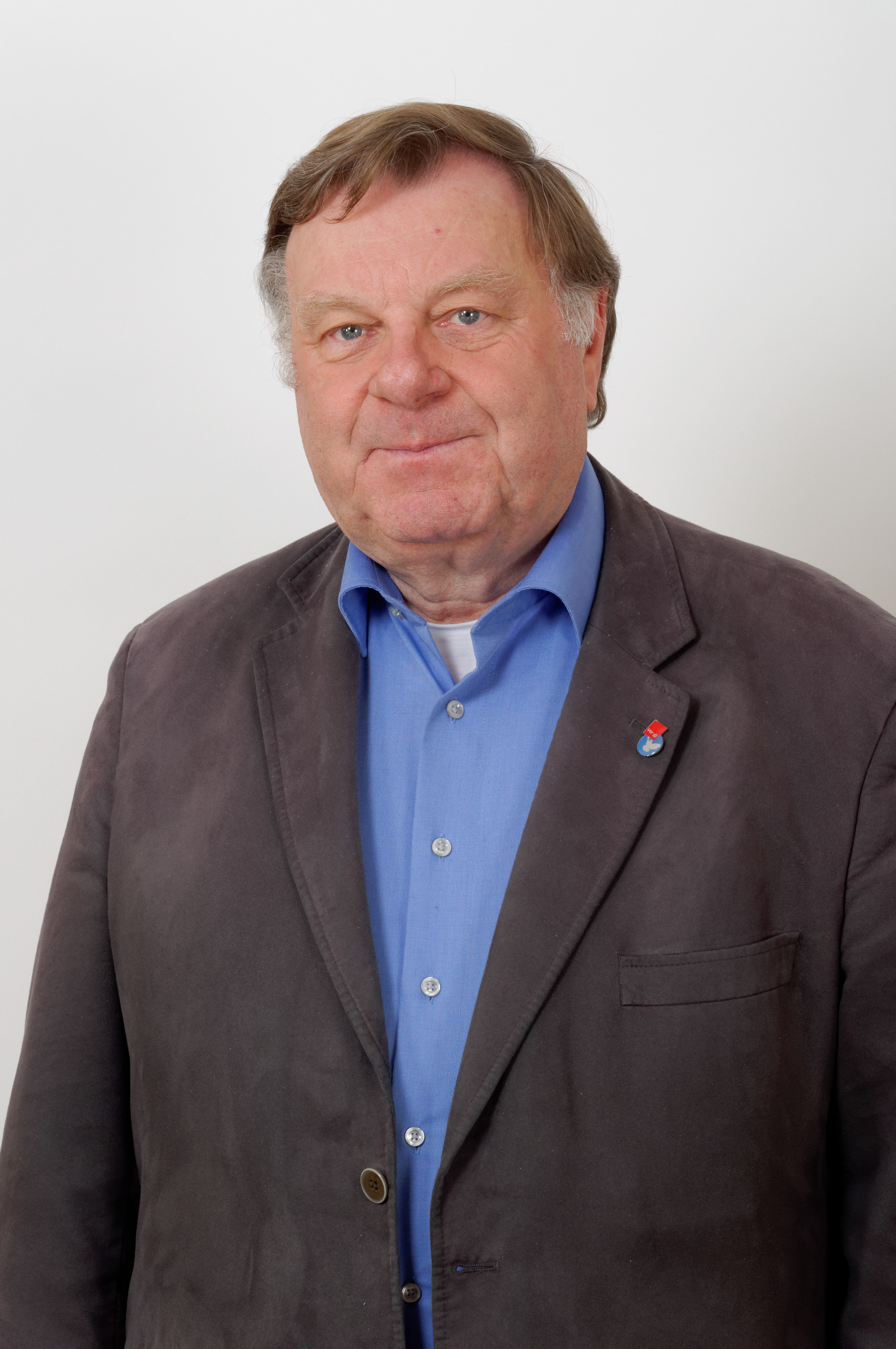
| | First party | Second party | Third party |
|---|---|---|---|
| Leader | Roland Koch | Thorsten Schäfer-Gümbel | Jörg-Uwe Hahn |
| Party | CDU | SPD | FDP |
| Last election | 42 seats, 36.8% | 42 seats, 36.7% | 11 seats, 9.4% |
| Seats won | 46 | 29 | 20 |
| Seat change | ▲4 | ▼13 | ▲9 |
| Popular vote | 963,763 | 614,648 | 420,426 |
| Percentage | 37.2% | 23.7% | 16.2% |
| Swing | ▲0.4% | ▼13.0% | ▲6.8% |
| | Fourth party | Fifth party |
| Leader | Tarek Al-Wazir | Willi van Ooyen |
| Party | Greens | Left |
| Last election | 9 seats, 7.5% | 6 seats, 5.1% |
| Seats won | 17 | 6 |
| Seat change | ▲8 | 0 |
| Popular vote | 356,040 | 139,074 |
| Percentage | 13.7% | 5.4% |
| Swing | ▲6.2% | ▲0.3% |
- Results for the single-member constituencies.
Minister-President before election
Roland Koch
CDU
Elected Minister-President
Roland Koch
CDU

The 2009 Hessian state election was held on 18 January 2009 to elect the members of the Landtag of Hesse. The election was called after the failure of all government formation attempts conducted after the 2008 state election held a year earlier. The Social Democratic Party (SPD) suffered major losses, falling from an effective tie with the Christian Democratic Union (CDU) to a 13.5-point deficit. The Free Democratic Party (FDP) and The Greens were the primary beneficiaries of the SPD's decline. After the election, the CDU formed a coalition government with the FDP, and Roland Koch was elected Minister-President.

== Background ==
The result of the 2008 Hessian state election was inconclusive, as neither the CDU–FDP or SPD–Green blocs had won a majority. This was due to the entry of The Left into the Landtag, with which the SPD was unwilling to cooperate, though both The Left and Greens supported a red-red-green coalition between the three parties. While a grand coalition between the CDU and SPD would command a comfortable majority, this option was very unpopular and was rejected by the SPD.

In October 2008, SPD leader Andrea Ypsilanti attempted to negotiate a red-red-green coalition, reneging on a pledge made earlier in the year not to do so. This caused a revolt within the Hessian SPD, resulting in Ypsilanti being deposed and the new leadership under Thorsten Schäfer-Gümbel seeking fresh elections.

CDU leader Roland Koch had served as Minister-President prior to the 2008 election, and continued in office in a caretaker capacity between the 2008 and 2009 elections. He could not be unseated due to the inability of the SPD to form a new government; in Hesse, the motion to remove a serving government simultaneously invests confidence in a proposed new government, and requires an absolute majority to pass.

== Parties ==
The table below lists parties represented in the previous Landtag of Hesse.

| Name | | Ideology | Leader(s) | 2008 result | |
| Name | | Ideology | Leader(s) | Votes (%) | Seats |
|---|---|---|---|---|---|
| CDU | Christian Democratic Union of Germany; Christlich Demokratische Union Deutschlands | Christian democracy | Roland Koch | 36.8% | 42 / 110 |
| SPD | Social Democratic Party of Germany; Sozialdemokratische Partei Deutschlands | Social democracy | Thorsten Schäfer-Gümbel | 36.7% | 42 / 110 |
| FDP | Free Democratic Party; Freie Demokratische Partei | Classical liberalism | Jörg-Uwe Hahn | 9.4% | 11 / 110 |
| Grüne | Alliance 90/The Greens; Bündnis 90/Die Grünen | Green politics | Tarek Al-Wazir | 7.5% | 9 / 110 |
| Linke | The Left; Die Linke | Democratic socialism | Willi van Ooyen | 5.1% | 6 / 110 |

== Opinion polling ==
| Polling firm | Fieldwork date | Sample size | CDU | SPD | FDP | Grüne | Linke | Others | Lead |
|---|---|---|---|---|---|---|---|---|---|
| 2009 state election | 18 January 2009 | – | 37.2 | 23.7 | 16.2 | 13.7 | 5.4 | 3.8 | 13.5 |
| Forsa | 6–9 Jan 2009 | 1,007 | 41 | 24 | 15 | 13 | 4 | 3 | 17 |
| Forschungsgruppe Wahlen | 6–8 Jan 2009 | 1,072 | 41 | 25 | 13 | 13 | 5 | 3 | 16 |
| Infratest dimap | 5–7 Jan 2009 | 1,000 | 42 | 24 | 13 | 13 | 5 | 3 | 18 |
| GMS | 15–17 Dec 2008 | 1,004 | 41 | 25 | 13 | 13 | 5 | 3 | 16 |
| Forsa | 8–12 Dec 2008 | 1,005 | 42 | 23 | 13 | 12 | 6 | 4 | 19 |
| Forschungsgruppe Wahlen | 1–4 Dec 2008 | 1,145 | 41 | 26 | 12 | 12 | 5 | 4 | 15 |
| Emnid | 28 Nov–3 Dec 2008 | 500 | 43 | 24 | 13 | 11 | 5 | 4 | 19 |
| Infratest dimap | 28 Nov–2 Dec 2008 | 1,000 | 41 | 23 | 13 | 14 | 6 | 3 | 18 |
| Infratest dimap | 4–5 Nov 2008 | 1,000 | 41 | 27 | 11 | 12 | 5 | 4 | 14 |
| Infratest dimap | 1–3 Sep 2008 | 1,000 | 39 | 28 | 12 | 11 | 7 | 3 | 11 |
| Forsa | 19–22 Aug 2008 | 1,001 | 28 | 26 | 12 | 11 | 8 | 5 | 12 |
| Forsa | 23 May–3 Jun 2008 | 1,005 | 40 | 27 | 11 | 9 | 8 | 5 | 13 |
| Forsa | 17 Mar–4 Apr 2008 | 1,007 | 40 | 28 | 10 | 9 | 8 | 5 | 12 |
| Emnid | 6 Apr 2008 | ? | 37 | 30 | 12 | 10 | 6 | ? | 7 |
| Emnid | 21 Feb–5 Mar 2008 | 1,000 | 37 | 35 | 9 | 7 | 7 | ? | 2 |
| 2008 state election | 27 January 2008 | – | 36.8 | 36.7 | 9.4 | 7.5 | 5.1 | 4.4 | 0.1 |

== Election result ==
Summary of the 18 January 2009 election results for the Landtag of Hesse
| Party | Constituency | | | Party list | | | | Total seats | +/- |
| Party | Votes | % | Seats | Votes | % | +/- | Seats | Total seats | +/- |
|---|---|---|---|---|---|---|---|---|---|
| Christian Democratic Union | 1,083,174 | 41.98 | 46 | 963,763 | 37.18 | +0.37 | 0 | 46 | +4 |
| Social Democratic Party | 767,068 | 29.73 | 9 | 614,648 | 23.71 | -12.97 | 20 | 29 | -13 |
| Free Democratic Party | 304,755 | 11.81 | 0 | 420,426 | 16.22 | +6.79 | 20 | 20 | +9 |
| Alliance 90/The Greens | 274,492 | 10.64 | 0 | 356,040 | 13.74 | +6.20 | 17 | 17 | +8 |
| The Left | 117,330 | 4.55 | 0 | 139,074 | 5.37 | +0.23 | 6 | 6 | 0 |
| Free Voters | 3,997 | 0.15 | 0 | 42,153 | 1.63 | +0.74 | 0 | 0 | 0 |
| National Democratic Party | 18,898 | 0.73 | 0 | 22,172 | 0.86 | -0.02 | 0 | 0 | 0 |
| The Republicans | 7,685 | 0.30 | 0 | 15,664 | 0.60 | -0.41 | 0 | 0 | 0 |
| Pirate Party | – | | | 13,796 | 0.53 | +0.28 | 0 | 0 | 0 |
| Civil Rights Movement Soliarity | 962 | 0.04 | 0 | 4,136 | 0.16 | +0.12 | 0 | 0 | 0 |
| Independents | 2,093 | 0.08 | 0 | – | | | | 0 | 0 |
| Total | 2,580,424 | 100.00 | 55 | 2,591,872 | 100.00 | | 63 | 118 | +8 |
| Invalid | 89,961 | 3.37 | | 78,513 | 2.94 | | | | |
| Turnout | 2,670,385 | 61.03 | | 2,670,385 | 61.03 | -3.29 | | | |
| Registered voters | 4,375,286 | | | 4,375,286 | | | | | |
