= Dagmar Metzger =

German lawyer and politician (born 1958)

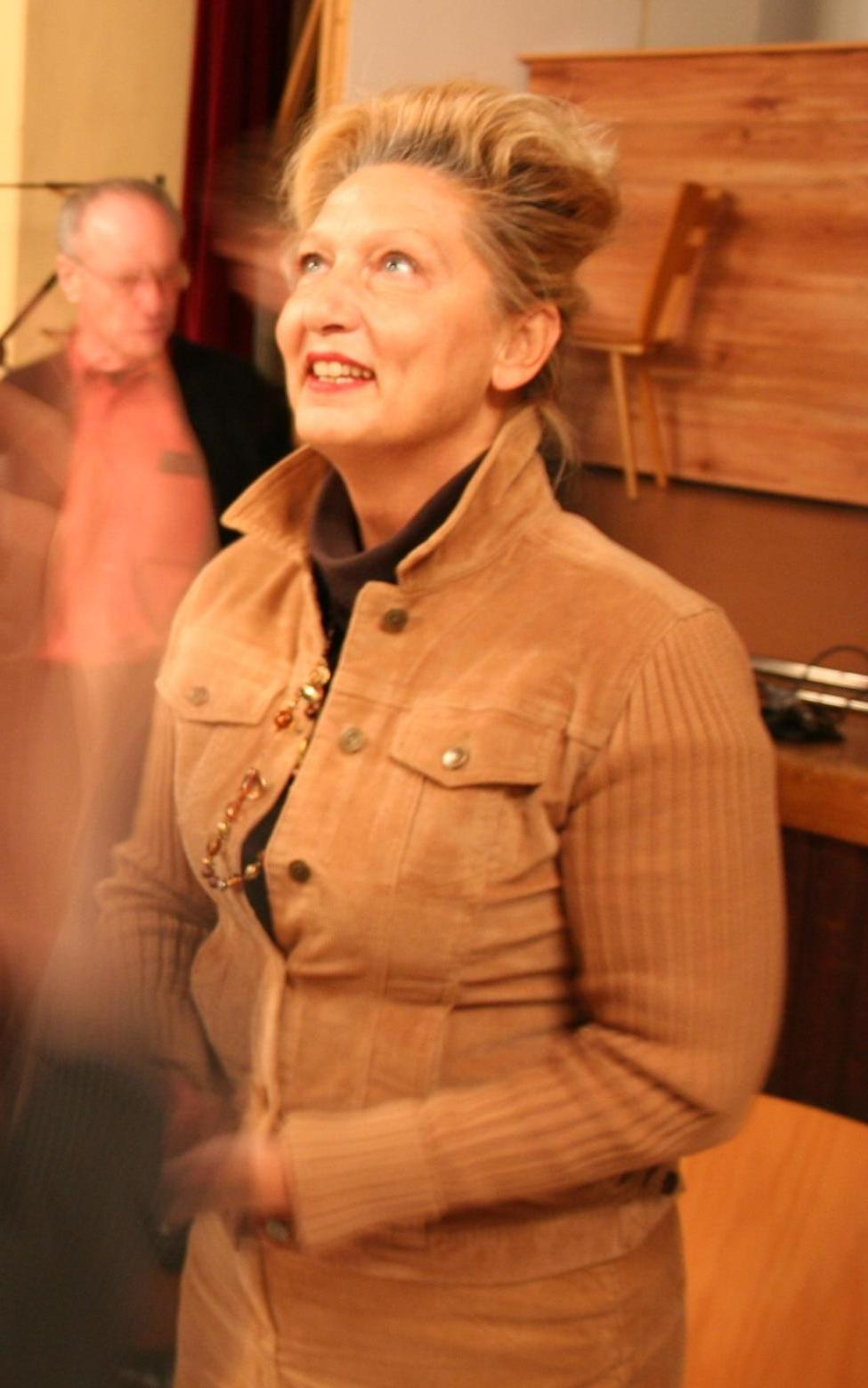
Metzger in 2007

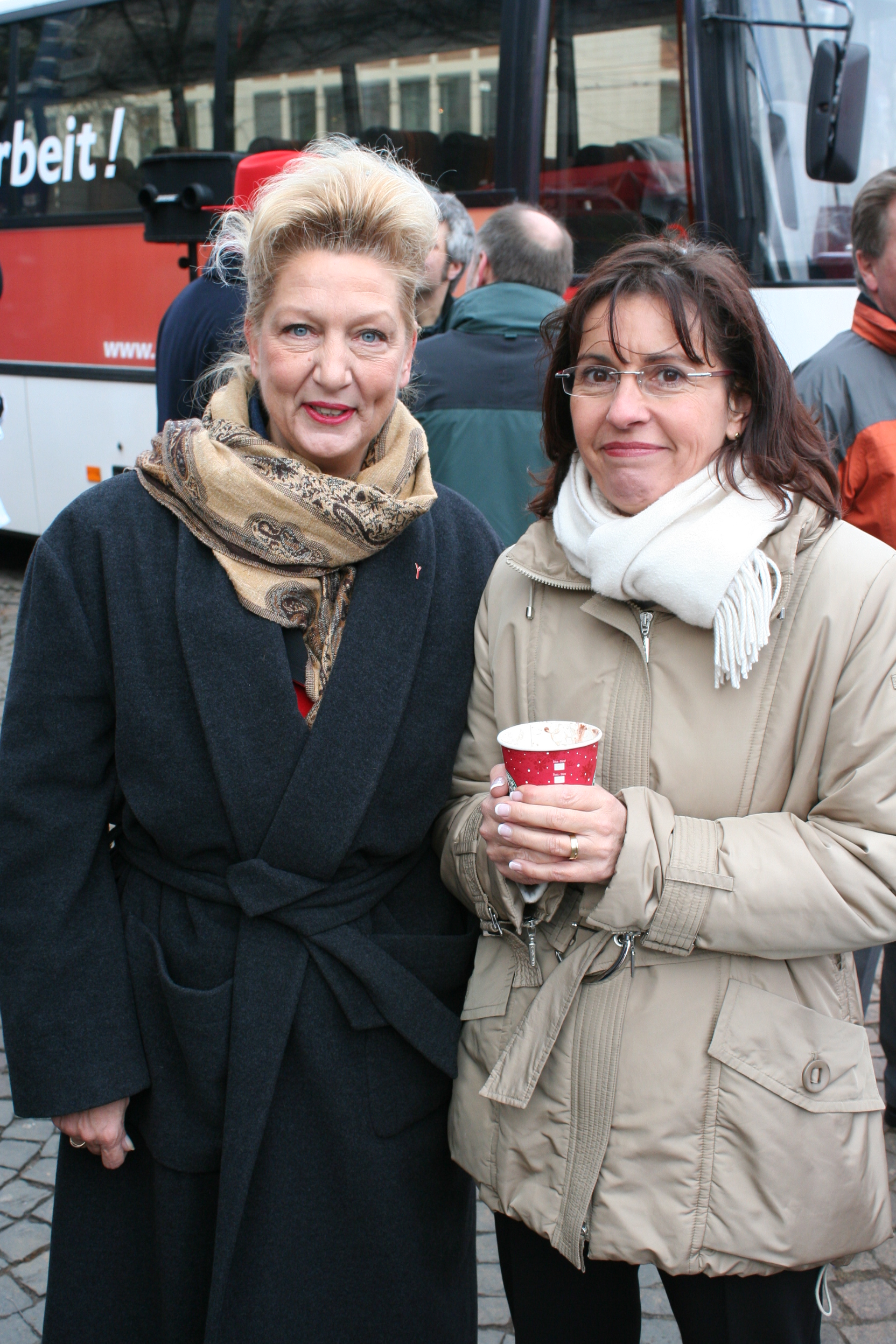
Dagmar Metzger and Andrea Ypsilanti during election campaign on Luisenplatz, Darmstadt

Dagmar Metzger (born 10 December 1958 in Berlin) is a German lawyer and politician, and a former member of the Parliament of Hesse for the Social Democratic Party of Germany (SPD).

She has been a member of the SPD since 1990, and was elected to the city council of Darmstadt in 1997. In the council, she headed the committee for culture and science from 2001 to 2006. Dagmar Metzer is the daughter-in-law of former Darmstadt mayor Günther Metzger.

In the 2008 Hesse state election, she was elected to the Parliament of Hesse.

She became known to a broader audience in March 2008, when she declared that she would not support Andrea Ypsilanti as Prime Minister of Hesse in the forthcoming election. Ypsilanti, chair of SPD in Hesse, intended to form a government with support of the far left party Die Linke, the successor of the East German communist party. The SPD party had vowed before the election not to cooperate with Die Linke under any circumstances. Her father-in-law also told journalists that Dagmar Metzger's father, a social democrat from Berlin, under threat of life had opposed the forced unification of SPD and the Communist Party of Germany to form the East German communist party.

In November 2008, Andrea Ypsilanti once again tried to form a government with support of Die Linke, but Metzger and her fellow SPD MPs Silke Tesch, Jürgen Walter and Carmen Everts declared they would not support Ypsilanti as Prime Minister if she formed a government with support of Die Linke, and the election of Ypsilanti as Prime Minister was canceled. This led to the 2009 Hesse state election in which Dagmar Metzger did not stand as a candidate.
