= Michael Boddenberg =

German politician

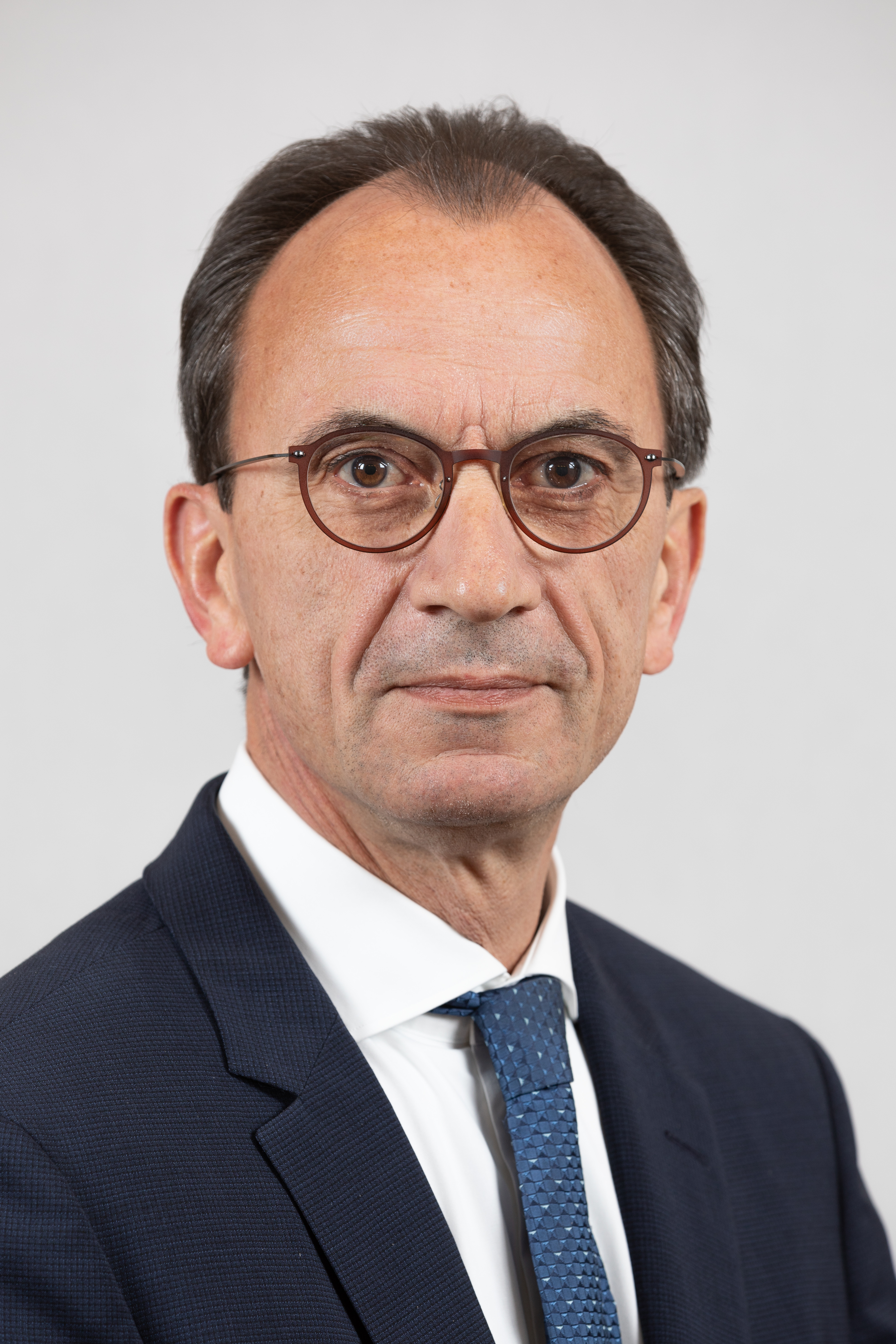
- Michael Boddenberg in 2019

Minister of Finance in Hesse
- Incumbent
- Assumed office 31 March 2020
- Preceded by: Thomas Schäfer

Personal details
- Born: 15 July 1959 (age 66) Troisdorf, North Rhine-Westphalia, West Germany
- Party: CDU
- Website: www.michael-boddenberg.de

Michael Boddenberg (born 15 July 1959) is a German politician of the Christian Democratic Union (CDU) who has been serving as Minister of Finance of Hesse since 3 April 2020.

== Career ==
Born in Troisdorf, Boddenberg completed school in 1978. He took the Meisterprüfung (Master exam) as a butcher in 1983.

Boddenberg was a member of the management of Mainfrost from 1984 to 1989. He was managing director of Fleischfeinkost Schäfer from 1995 to 2002. Simultaneously, he directed the private school for butchers and bakers J. A. Heyne in Frankfurt from 1989 to 2009. He was managing director of the Boddenberg, Heyne & Partner GmbH from 1993 to 2009.

== Political career ==
Boddenberg joined the Christian Democratic Union of Germany in 1985. He was a member of the Frankfurt am Main city council from 1993 to 1999. In 1999, he was elected to the Landtag, the parliament of Hesse. In 2001, he became Secretary General and managing director of the CDU in Hesse in 2001, serving until 2009. He served as speaker of economic politics for the CDU parliamentary group from 2004 to 2009.

Boddenberg was the Hessian State Minister for Federal Affairs and representative of Hesse to the federal government from 5 February 2009 to 18 January 2014, responsible for the relationship of state and national government. He then became the head of the CDU parliamentary group in the Landtag.

On 31 March 2020, Boddenberg was designated as State Minister of Finance in Hesse, succeeding Thomas Schäfer. He was sworn in on 3 April 2020. His successor as head of the CDU parliamentary group is Ines Claus. As one of the state's representatives at the Bundesrat, he serves on the Finance Committee.

Boddenberg was nominated by his party as delegate to the Federal Convention for the purpose of electing the President of Germany in 2022.

== Other activities ==
=== Corporate boards ===
- Fraport, Member of the Supervisory Board (since 2020)
- Central Cooperative of the European Meat Trade (ZENTRAG), Chairman of the Supervisory Board

=== Non-profit organizations ===
- Institute for Law and Finance, Goethe University Frankfurt, Member of the Board of Trustees
- Leibniz Institute for Financial Research (SAFE), Member of the Policy Council
- Hessischer Rundfunk (HR), Member of the Broadcasting Council
- Rheingau Musik Festival, Member of the Supervisory Board
