= Jürgen Banzer =

German politician

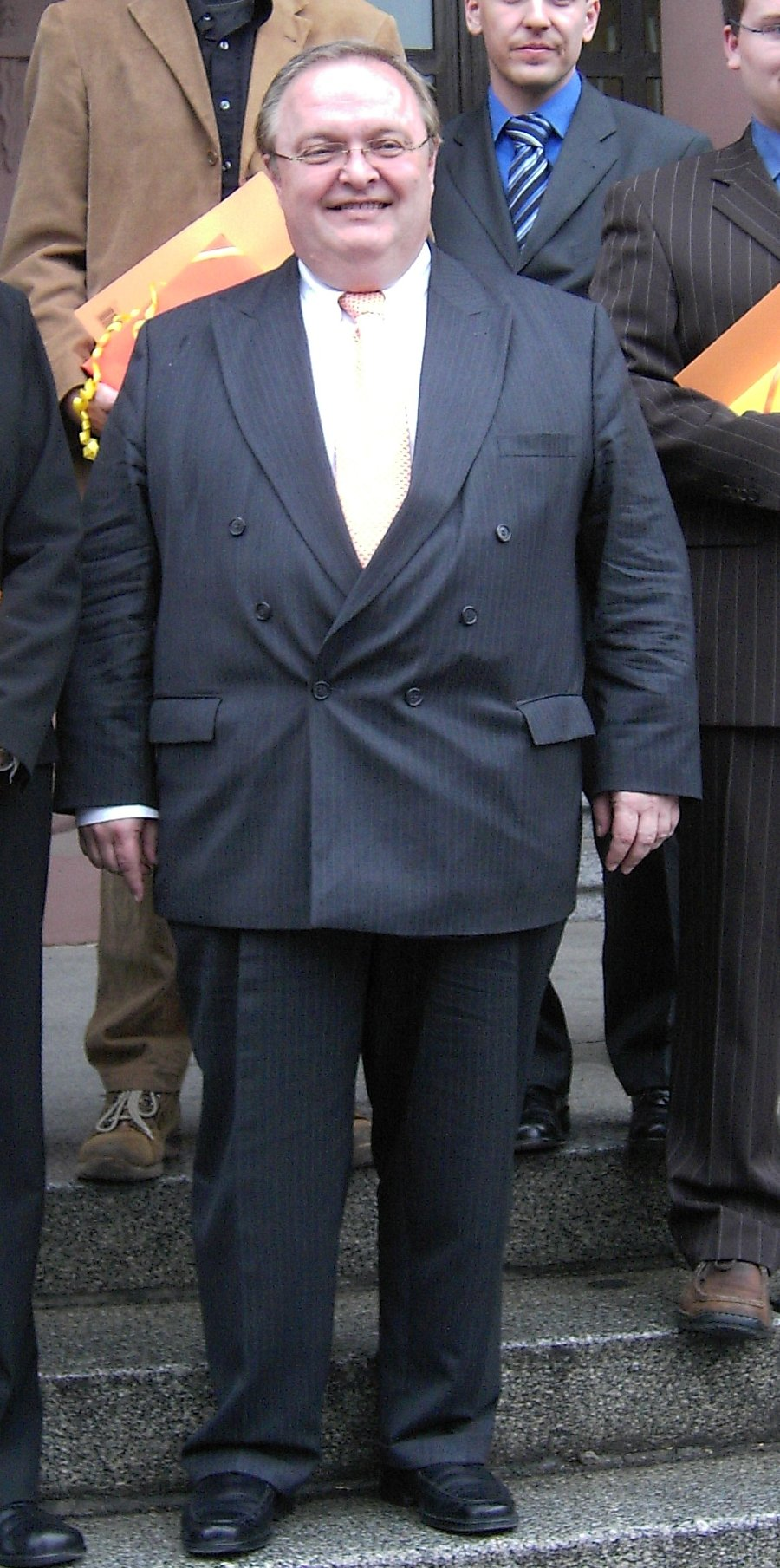

Jürgen Banzer (born 17 April 1955, in Würzburg) is a German politician. He is a representative of the German Christian Democratic Union and minister for work, family and health in the administration of Roland Koch in Hesse.

After visiting Holzhausenschule in Frankfurt and Bischof-Neumann-Schule in Königstein, Jürgen Banzer studied law at the Johann Wolfgang Goethe University Frankfurt am Main and catholic theology at the Sankt Georgen Graduate School of Philosophy and Theology.

Jürgen Banzer acted from 1991 to 2005 as Landrat in the Hochtaunuskreis. 2005 he became Justice minister in Hesse. 2008 he was Minister of Justice as well as Education minister. 2009 he took over responsibility for work family and health.

== See also ==
- List of German Christian Democratic Union politicians
