= Roland Koch =

German jurist and politician

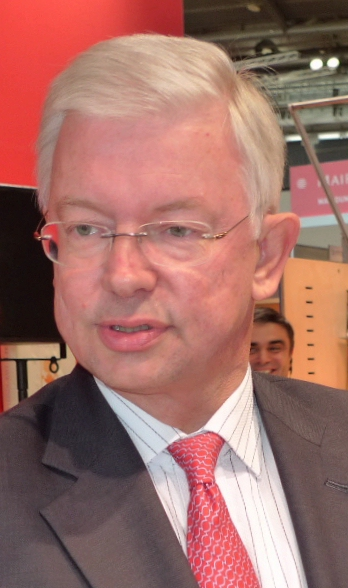
- Koch in 2008

Minister-President of Hesse
- In office 7 April 1999 – 31 August 2010
- Deputy: Ruth Wagner; Karin Wolff; Volker Bouffier; Jörg-Uwe Hahn
- Preceded by: Hans Eichel
- Succeeded by: Volker Bouffier

President of the Bundesrat
- In office 30 April 1999 – 31 October 1999
- Preceded by: Hans Eichel
- Succeeded by: Kurt Biedenkopf

Leader of the Christian Democratic Union in Hesse
- In office 25 January 1998 – 12 June 2010
- General Secretary: Siegbert Seitz; Herbert Müller; Otti Geschka; Michael Boddenberg; Peter Beuth
- Preceded by: Manfred Kanther
- Succeeded by: Volker Bouffier

Leader of the Christian Democratic Union in the Landtag of Hesse
- In office 13 July 1993 – 5 April 1999
- Preceded by: Manfred Kanther
- Succeeded by: Norbert Kartmann
- In office 27 November 1990 – 5 April 1991
- Preceded by: Hartmut Nassauer
- Succeeded by: Manfred Kanther

Member of the Landtag of Hesse for Main-Taunus I
- In office 5 April 1987 – 1 September 2010
- Preceded by: Karl-Heinz Koch
- Succeeded by: Christian Heinz

Personal details
- Born: 24 March 1958 (age 68) Frankfurt, West Germany
- Party: CDU
- Education: Goethe University Frankfurt
- Occupation: Jurist
- Website: roland-koch.de

Roland Koch (born 24 March 1958) is a German jurist and former conservative politician of the Christian Democratic Union (CDU). He was the 7th Minister President of Hesse from 7 April 1999, immediately becoming the 53rd President of the Bundesrat, completing the term begun by his predecessor as Minister President, Hans Eichel, until his resignation on 31 August 2010. During his time in office, Koch was widely regarded as one of Chancellor Angela Merkel's main rivals within the CDU.

== Early life and education ==
Koch was born in Frankfurt am Main. He studied law and graduated in 1985. In 1979, Koch became the youngest person to hold the office of chairman of the CDU in Main-Taunus district.

== Political career ==
From 1983 until 1987, Koch served as vice-chair of the federal youth organization of the CDU.

In the 1987 state elections, Koch was elected to the State Parliament of Hesse. From 1989 until 1997 he was also a member of the Main-Taunus district council and parliamentary leader of the local CDU group. In 1991 he became vice-chair of the CDU parliamentary group, and in 1993 its chair. Until then Koch had been a city council member in his hometown of Eschborn.

From 1998 onward, Koch was chair of the CDU in Hesse.

=== Minister-President of Hesse, 1999–2010 ===
In the state elections in 1999, the CDU began collecting signatures to document the resistance in the population to plans of the federal government to make dual citizenship easier for foreigners to obtain. Because some people viewed this as "collecting signatures against foreigners", this campaign was portrayed as "xenophobic". Koch won the election and displaced the incumbent, Hans Eichel. Under his leadership, the CDU achieved the best result for the party there in 60 years.

In 2003, Koch and Peer Steinbrück, the Social Democrat premier of North Rhine Westphalia, together drew up a plan to reduce tax breaks and subsidies, including those on coal by 12 percent over several years. The subsidies were a particularly sensitive issue in North Rhine-Westphalia, where most of the coal mines are located.

Ahead of the 2004 German presidential election, Koch publicly endorsed Wolfgang Schäuble as the Christian Democrats’s candidate to succeed incumbent President Johannes Rau.

Under the leadership of party chairwoman Angela Merkel, Koch was elected vice-chairman of the CDU in November 2006, alongside Jürgen Rüttgers, Annette Schavan and Christian Wulff. By 2007, he and Rüttgers, his counterpart from the state of North Rhine-Westphalia, agreed on approving a merger of their respective state-owned banks, WestLB and Landesbank Hessen-Thüringen (Helaba). WestLB was eventually broken up in 2012 after years of losses and controversy.

Prior to the Hesse state election of 2008 Koch was once again accused of using xenophobic tactics by pledging to get tough on youth crime, which is concentrated among immigrant and minority groups. In the course of the election he lost his party's majority in the Hessian Parliament, but remained acting Minister President as his SPD challenger Andrea Ypsilanti was unable to form a government. Since none of the parties was able to build a majority coalition, they decided to give the voters another chance to produce a workable result.

In the January 2009 election the FDP made significant gains which allowed Koch to form a conservative-liberal coalition government, reelecting him as the Minister President of the State of Hesse. Ahead of the 2009 federal elections, he was tipped as a potential finance or economics minister in a coalition government of CDU/CSU and FDP.

In his capacity as Minister-President, Koch held various other positions, including the following:

- Fraport, Chairman of the Supervisory Board (1999–2003)
- ZDF, Member of the Board of Directors (2002–2011)
- Hessische Kulturstiftung, Chairman of the Board of Trustees

On 25 May 2010 Koch announced his withdrawal from the active politics. At the time, he said he had informed Merkel of his plan to leave politics more than a year before. He resigned as Minister-President of Hesse on 31 August 2010. He hinted that he was departing politics in order to become active in the business world.

=== Political positions ===
Koch was seen as a rhetorically gifted politician; critics have accused him of populism. A sometimes polarizing figure on his party's right, Koch proved to be one of the main defenders of business and financial interests within his party. In 2010, Koch and Merkel clashed over budget cuts, as Koch proposed cutbacks in education and research that Merkel opposed. He also suggested that a law passed to provide a guaranteed child-care facilities for children under 3 would have to be reconsidered. In his final years as Minister-President, he largely worked smoothly with Merkel. Ahead of the Christian Democrats' leadership election in 2018, Koch publicly endorsed Friedrich Merz to succeed Angela Merkel as the party's chair.

On foreign policy, Koch forged a friendship with the Dalai Lama and supported the self-determination of Tibet.

== Life after politics ==
On 29 October 2010, Koch was announced as designated chief executive officer of Bilfinger Berger, Germany's second-largest builder. In the following years, he orchestrated a reshuffle at the company away from civil engineering and construction in favor of higher-margin industrial services. During his tenure, Bilfinger Berger also agreed with the United States Department of Justice in 2013 to pay $32 million to resolve U.S. criminal charges that it bribed Nigerian officials to obtain contracts on a gas project in the African nation. In August 2014, he stepped down from the position on mutually agreed terms after he took responsibility for two profit warnings.

In 2015, Koch opened a law firm in Frankfurt. Since 2017, he has also been a Professor of Management Practice in Regulated Environments at the Frankfurt School of Finance & Management.

Koch was a CDU delegate to the Federal Convention for the purpose of electing the President of Germany in 2017 in 2022.

In 2025, the representatives of public sector employers – Nancy Faeser and Karin Welge – appointed Koch as their arbitrator in a dispute with employees; appointed by the German Civil Service Federation and United Services Trade Union (ver.di), Hans-Henning Lühr served as his counterpart in the talks.

== Other activities ==
=== Corporate boards ===
- Dussmann Group Verwaltungs AG, Member of the Supervisory Board (since 2017)
- Vodafone Germany, Member of the Supervisory Board (since 2015)
- UBS Deutschland, Chairman of the Supervisory Board (2011–2021)

=== Non-profit organizations ===
- Ludwig Erhard Foundation, Chairman of the Board (since 2020)
- Konrad Adenauer Foundation (KAS), Member of the Board of Trustees
- American Chamber of Commerce in Germany (AmCham Germany), Member of the Board of Directors
- German Tuberous Sclerosis Association, Patron (since 2010)
- Rheingau Musik Festival, Chairman of the Board of Trustees
- Senckenberg Nature Research Society, Member of the Board of Trustees
- Städel Museum, Member of the Board of Trustees

== Recognition ==
- 2018 – Alfred Dregger Medal

== Controversy ==
In February 2018, Bilfinger announced it would sue Koch and other former executives of the company for at least 100 million euros ($123 million) in damages for alleged breaches of duty in compliance and mergers.

== Personal life ==
His father Karl-Heinz Koch was a politician in Hessen. Koch and his wife Anke have two sons. He is a Roman Catholic.

Political offices
Preceded by Hans Eichel (SPD)	Minister-President of Hesse; 1999–2010	Succeeded by Volker Bouffier (CDU)
