= Andrea Ypsilanti =

German politician (born 1957)

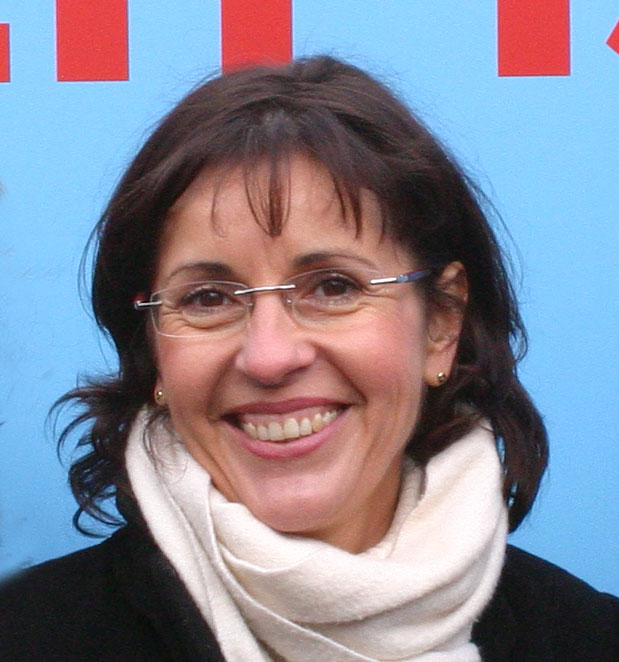

Personal details
- Born: Andrea Dill; 8 April 1957 (age 69) Rüsselsheim, Hesse, West Germany
- Party: Social Democratic Party
- Education: University of Frankfurt

Andrea Ypsilanti (née Dill; born 8 April 1957) is a German politician.

== Political career ==
Ypsilanti was a member of the Hessian Landtag (parliament) and served as chairperson of the Social Democratic Party (SPD) of Hesse from March 2003 to January 2009.

In the Hesse state elections of 2008, held on 27 January 2008, she was the SPD's candidate for the position of minister-president (Ministerpräsident), or prime minister, of Hesse. In that election, her party received 36.7 per cent of the vote - only 0.1 per cent less than the Christian Democratic Union (CDU) of incumbent Roland Koch, which had ruled the state since 1999. Thus, the Hesse SPD came in second, but gained the same number of representatives in the Landtag as the CDU. Overall, the 2008 election led to a deadlock in the state parliament, because neither the CDU and the Free Democratic Party (FDP), nor the SPD and the Green Party, had enough seats to constitute a parliamentary majority, thus enabling the formation of a coalition government. The reason for this was that the Die Linke had entered the Landtag for the first time ever with 5.3% of the vote. Hessian constitution allows for continued operation of the previous government in case of a hung parliament.

Before the 2008 election, Ypsilanti had promised on many occasions to never work together with the Left Party. However, after a "grand coalition" with the CDU was ruled out, Ypsilanti ultimately decided to cooperate with the Left Party in order to be elected prime minister and overcome the deadlock. The first attempt was abandoned after Dagmar Metzger, one of her own party's representatives in the Landtag, declared she would not vote for Ypsilanti because of the latter's cooperation with the Left Party.

A second attempt to elect Ypsilanti prime minister was scheduled for 4 November 2008. However, one day prior to the election, three other SPD representatives - Carmen Everts, Silke Tesch, and Jürgen Walter (vice chairman of the Hesse SPD) - also announced that they would vote against her, making it impossible for Ypsilanti to gain the needed majority. This, in turn, forced the dissolution of the Landtag and the scheduling of new elections for 18 January 2009. On 8 November 2008, Ypsilanti withdrew her candidacy in favor of Thorsten Schäfer-Gümbel, who became the SPD's new lead candidate (Spitzenkandidat).

Preliminary election results on 18 January 2009 indicated that the CDU and the (FDP) together won 64 seats in the parliament - five more than the 59 required - and thus could begin forming a governing coalition. At the same time the SPD lost 13 per cent of the vote compared to the previous election, falling to an historic low in Hesse and one of the worst showings by the party in a German state election. After the preliminary results were published, Ypsilanti announced her resignation as party chairperson.

In February 2010, Ypsilanti, together with Sven Giegold of the Green Party, Katja Kipping of the Left Party, and others, founded the Institut Solidarische Moderne, a left-wing think tank opposed to neoliberalism.

== Personal life ==
Ypsilanti grew up in Rüsselsheim as the daughter of a worker at the local Opel factory. After finishing school she worked as a secretary and then as a flight attendant for Lufthansa. From 1986 until 1992 she studied sociology, political science and education in Frankfurt, graduating with a master's in sociology. She wrote her thesis on the theme "Women and Power". After her divorce in 1992 she kept her Greek husband's last name Ypsilanti. She lives with her partner in Frankfurt.
