= Hessian Ministry of Economics, Energy, Transport and Housing =

Government of Hesse

Coordinates: 50°04′18″N 8°14′20″E

The Hessian Ministry of Economics, Energy, Transport and Housing (German: Hessisches Ministerium für Wirtschaft, Energie, Verkehr und Wohnen), abbreviated HMWEVW, is a state institution of the German State of Hesse. It has its headquarters in the state capital of Wiesbaden.

The offices for roads and transport are for the planning, construction and expansion and maintenance of federal highways, federal and state roads and have regional responsibility and jurisdiction over some of the planning of county and township roads on behalf of counties and municipalities . The Ministry is responsible for the planning approval of federal roads and highways. Further responsibilities include land planning and village renewal, and awarding the Rheingau Literatur Preis.
