= Jörg-Uwe Hahn =

German politician (born 1956)

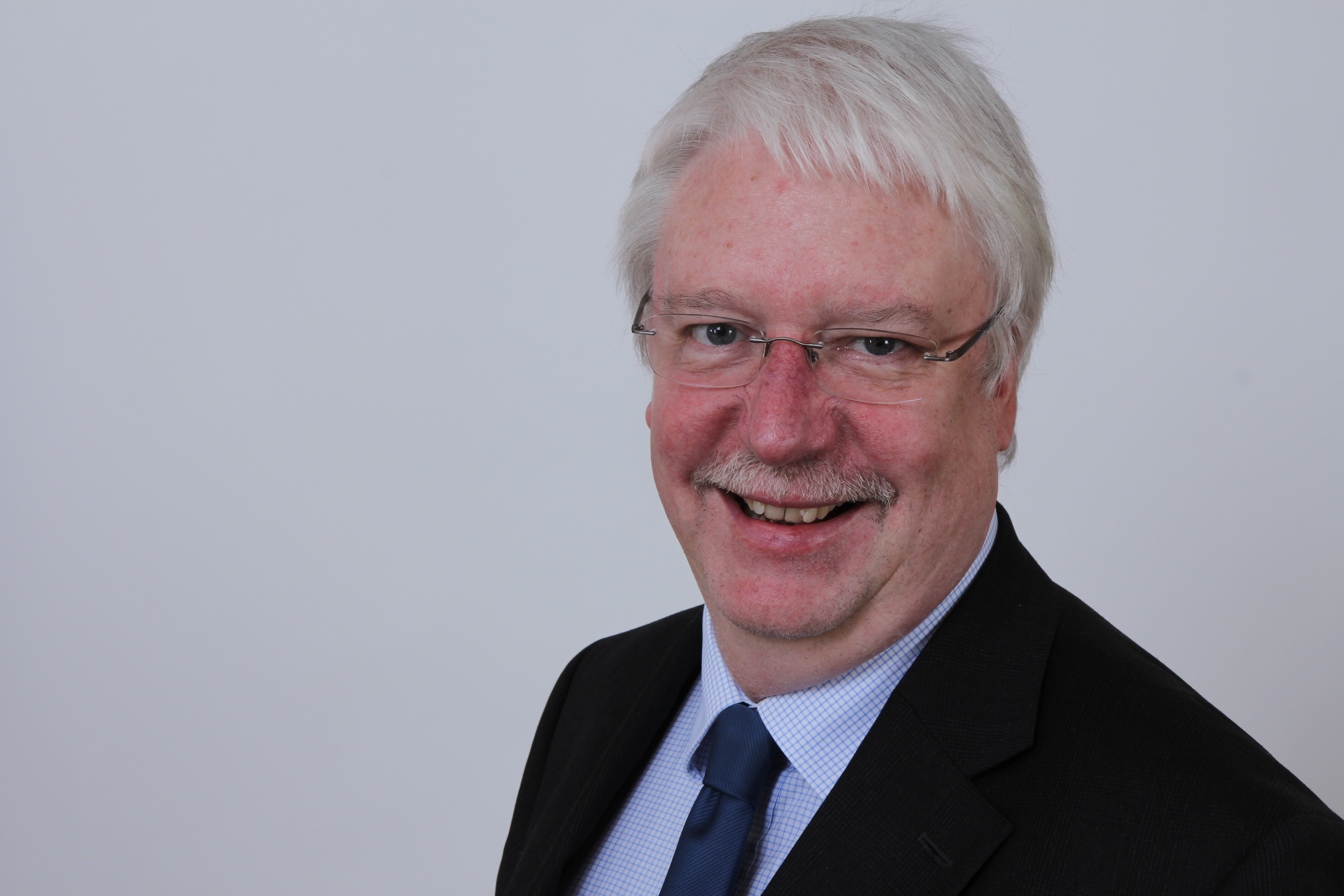
Jörg-Uwe Hahn (2013)

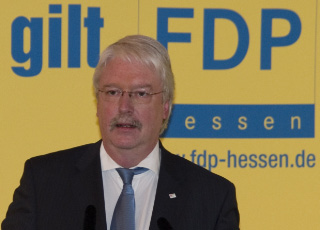
Jörg-Uwe Hahn (2013)

Jörg-Uwe Hahn (born 21 September 1956 in Kassel) is a German politician of the FDP.

== Life ==
Hahn studied German law in Frankfurt am Main. From 2009 until early 2014, Hahn was minister of justice in Hesse. After the FDP was dropped from the ruling coalition following the 2013 Hessian State election, Hahn resigned as leader of the Hessian FDP. Hahn is married and has two children.
