= 2008 Hessian state election =

State election in Hesse, Germany

2008 Hesse state election
- 27 January 2008

All 110 seats of the Landtag of Hesse 56 seats needed for a majority
- Turnout: 2,742,959 (64.3%) ▼0.3%
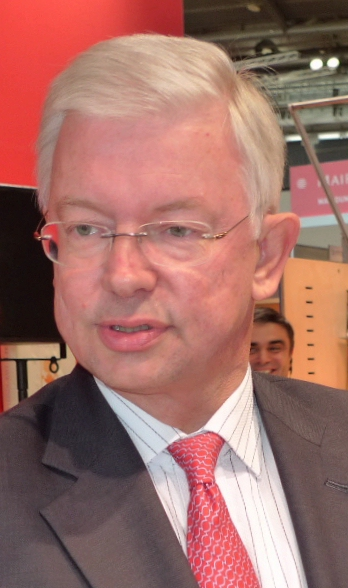

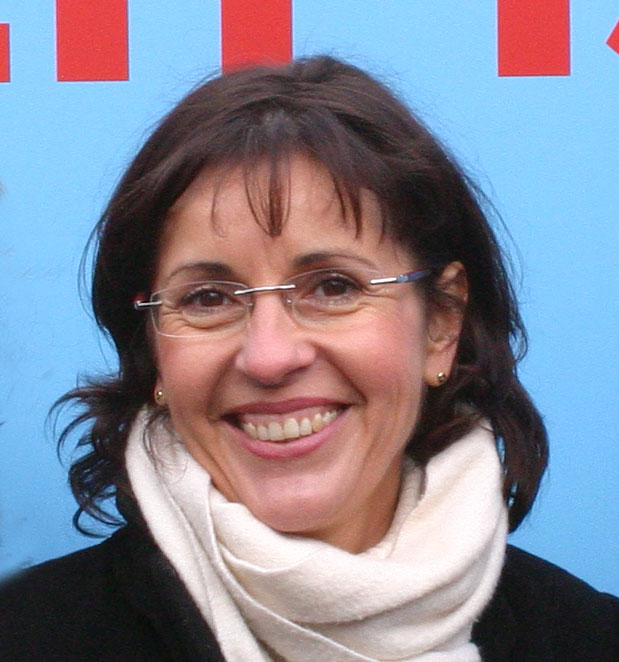

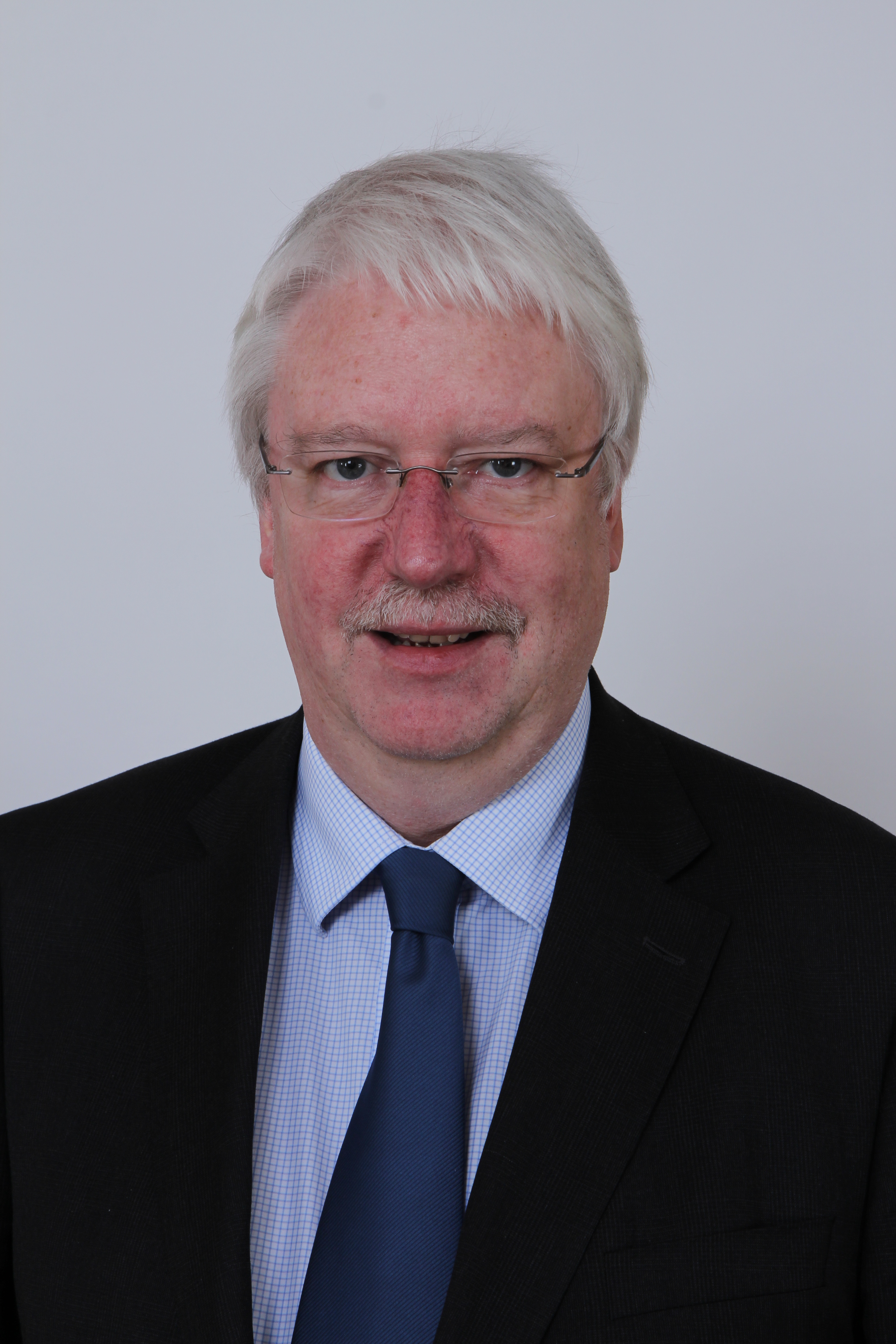

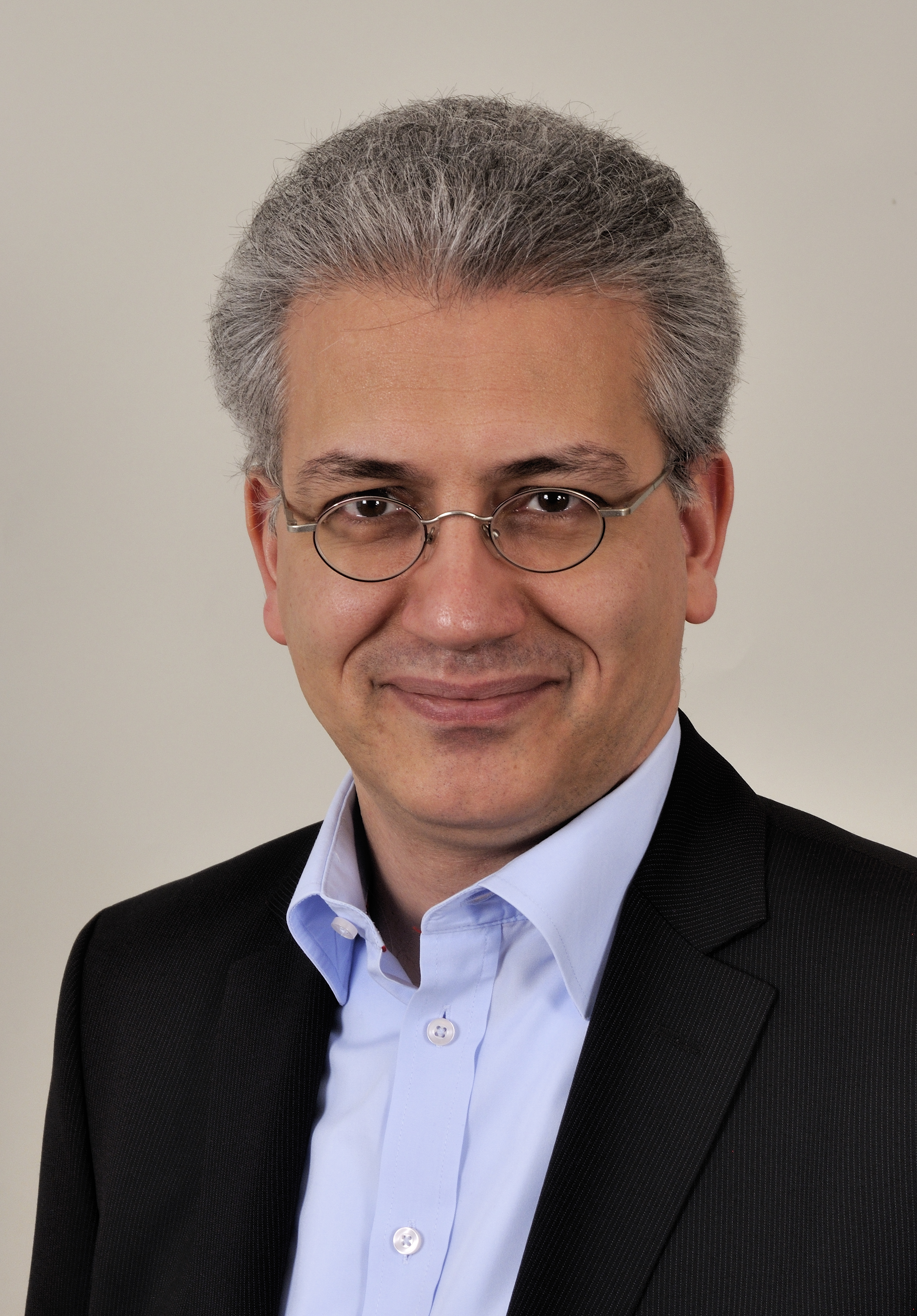

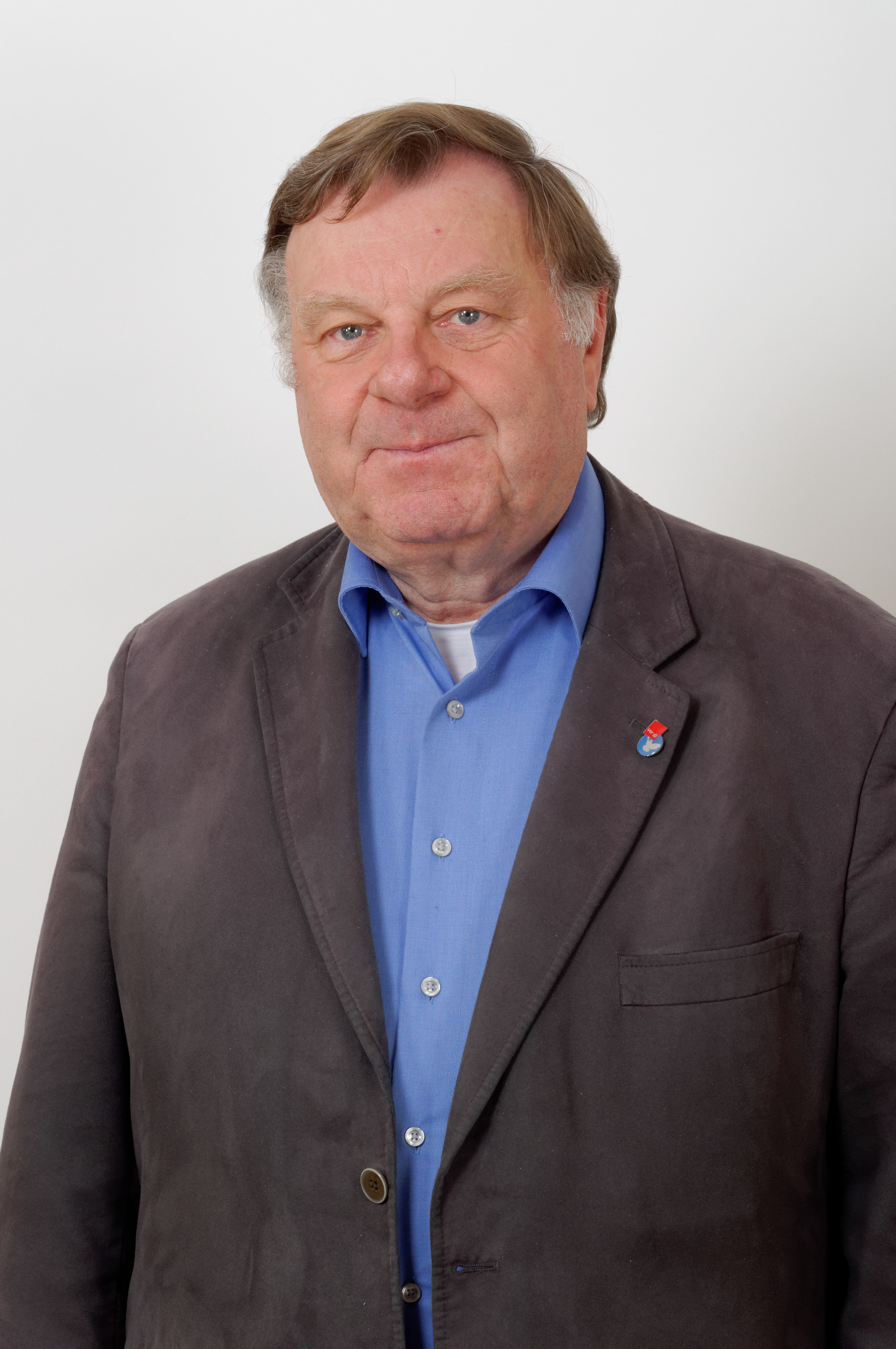
| | First party | Second party | Third party |
|---|---|---|---|
| Leader | Roland Koch | Andrea Ypsilanti | Jörg-Uwe Hahn |
| Party | CDU | SPD | FDP |
| Last election | 56 seats, 48.8% | 33 seats, 29.1% | 9 seats, 7.9% |
| Seats won | 42 | 42 | 11 |
| Seat change | ▼14 | ▲9 | ▲2 |
| Popular vote | 1,009,775 | 1,006,263 | 258,550 |
| Percentage | 36.8% | 36.7% | 9.4% |
| Swing | ▼12.0% | ▲7.6% | ▲1.5% |
| | Fourth party | Fifth party |
| Leader | Tarek Al-Wazir | Willi van Ooyen |
| Party | Greens | Left |
| Last election | 12 seats, 10.1% | Did not run |
| Seats won | 9 | 6 |
| Seat change | ▼3 | ▲6 |
| Popular vote | 206,610 | 140,769 |
| Percentage | 7.5% | 5.1% |
| Swing | ▼2.6% | ▲5.1% |
- Results for the single-member constituencies.
Minister-President before election
Roland Koch
CDU
Elected Minister-President
Roland Koch
CDU

The 2008 Hessian state election was held on 27 January 2008 to elect the members of the Landtag of Hesse. The incumbent Christian Democratic Union (CDU) government led by Minister-President Roland Koch lost its majority. The result of the election was extremely close but inconclusive, with the CDU winning just 3,500 votes (0.1%) more than the Social Democratic Party (SPD). Due to the entrance of The Left to the Landtag, neither the CDU–FDP or SPD–Green bloc garnered a majority. After a year of failed attempts to form government, a new election was held.

== Background and issues ==
The CDU won a majority in the 2003 state election, but lost popularity in the following years. In the 2008 election campaign, CDU Minister-President Roland Koch took a tough stance against immigrant youth violence as an electoral tactic. The political left criticised this as xenophobic. Other issues included minimum wage concerns, education, and controversy over the planned major expansion of the Rhine-Main airport.

The formation of The Left meant that a party to the left of the SPD and Greens stood a serious chance of entering the Landtag for the first time in decades. The party polled between 4 and 6 per cent in the lead-up to the election; it was unclear if the party would exceed the 5% threshold.

Polling data narrowed as the election approached; both the CDU and SPD and their junior partners the FDP and Greens were essentially tied. This meant that, if The Left entered the Landtag, it may hold the balance of power and make government formation difficult.

== Parties ==
The table below lists parties represented in the previous Landtag of Hesse.

| Name | | Ideology | Leader(s) | 2003 result | |
| Name | | Ideology | Leader(s) | Votes (%) | Seats |
|---|---|---|---|---|---|
| CDU | Christian Democratic Union of Germany; Christlich Demokratische Union Deutschlands | Christian democracy | Roland Koch | 48.8% | 56 / 110 |
| SPD | Social Democratic Party of Germany; Sozialdemokratische Partei Deutschlands | Social democracy | Andrea Ypsilanti | 29.1% | 33 / 110 |
| Grüne | Alliance 90/The Greens; Bündnis 90/Die Grünen | Green politics | Tarek Al-Wazir | 10.1% | 12 / 110 |
| FDP | Free Democratic Party; Freie Demokratische Partei | Classical liberalism | Jörg-Uwe Hahn | 7.9% | 9 / 110 |

== Opinion polling ==
| Polling firm | Fieldwork date | Sample size | CDU | SPD | Grüne | FDP | Linke | Others | Lead |
|---|---|---|---|---|---|---|---|---|---|
| 2008 state election | 27 January 2008 | – | 36.8 | 36.7 | 7.5 | 9.4 | 5.1 | 3.4 | 0.1 |
| AMR Düsseldorf | 23–24 Jan 2008 | 1,000 | 37 | 38 | 7 | 10 | 5 | ? | 1 |
| Forsa | 22–24 Jan 2008 | 1,006 | 38–39 | 37–38 | 6–7 | 9–10 | 4–5 | 3–4 | 1 |
| Forsa | 14–18 Jan 2008 | 1,005 | 38 | 38 | 7 | 9 | 5 | 3 | Tie |
| Forschungsgruppe Wahlen | 14–17 Jan 2008 | 1,100 | 38 | 37 | 8 | 8 | 5 | 4 | 1 |
| GMS | 15–16 Jan 2008 | 1,010 | 39 | 34 | 8 | 9 | 5 | 5 | 5 |
| Infratest dimap | 14–16 Jan 2008 | 1,000 | 38 | 37 | 7 | 8 | 6 | 3 | 1 |
| Forschungsgruppe Wahlen | 7–9 Jan 2008 | 1,000 | 40 | 36 | 7 | 8 | 5 | ? | 4 |
| Infratest dimap | 3–8 Jan 2008 | 1,000 | 40 | 35 | 9 | 9 | 4 | 3 | 5 |
| Emnid | 10 Dec–2 Jan 2008 | 800 | 42 | 32 | 10 | 8 | 5 | 3 | 10 |
| AMR Düsseldorf | 29 Dec 2007 | 1,000 | 40 | 33 | 10 | 9 | 6 | 2 | 7 |
| Forsa | 3–7 Dec 2007 | 1,002 | 41 | 30 | 11 | 9 | 5 | 4 | 11 |
| Forschungsgruppe Wahlen | 3–5 Dec 2007 | 1,052 | 40 | 34 | 9 | 7 | 6 | 4 | 6 |
| Forsa | 18–21 Sep 2007 | 1,001 | 43 | 30 | 9 | 8 | 5 | 5 | 13 |
| Infratest dimap | 3–5 Sep 2007 | 1,000 | 42 | 32 | 10 | 8 | 4 | 4 | 10 |
| TNS Infratest | 9–11 Jul 2007 | 1,000 | 40 | 33 | 11 | 7 | 5 | 4 | 7 |
| Forsa | 11–26 Jun 2007 | 1,012 | 41 | 27 | 11 | 9 | 6 | 6 | 14 |
| Emnid | 30 Apr–16 May 2007 | 599 | 40 | 32 | 11 | 9 | 4 | 4 | 8 |
| Infratest dimap | 19–21 Mar 2007 | 1,001 | 38 | 34 | 10 | 9 | 4 | 5 | 4 |
| Forsa | 26 Feb–13 Mar 2007 | 1,027 | 43 | 27 | 11 | 9 | 4 | 6 | 16 |
| Forsa | 20 Nov–12 Dec 2006 | 1,023 | 42 | 27 | 10 | 9 | 5 | 7 | 15 |
| Forsa | 14 Sep–11 Oct 2006 | 1,170 | 41 | 27 | 12 | 11 | 3 | 6 | 14 |
| Forsa | 15 May–9 Jun 2006 | 1,225 | 39 | 31 | 11 | 9 | 5 | 5 | 8 |
| Infratest dimap | 10–15 Mar 2006 | 1,002 | 40 | 35 | 10 | 7 | 4 | 4 | 4 |
| Infratest dimap | 19 Oct 2003 | 1,000 | 52 | 28 | 11 | 5 | – | 4 | 24 |
| 2003 state election | 2 February 2003 | – | 48.8 | 29.1 | 10.1 | 7.9 | – | 3.4 | 19.7 |

== Election result ==
Summary of the 27 January 2008 election results for the Landtag of Hesse
| Party | Constituency | | | Party list | | | | Total seats | +/- |
| Party | Votes | % | Seats | Votes | % | +/- | Seats | Total seats | +/- |
|---|---|---|---|---|---|---|---|---|---|
| Christian Democratic Union | 1,068,358 | 39.13 | 28 | 1,009,775 | 36.81 | -11.96 | 14 | 42 | ▼14 |
| Social Democratic Party | 1,047,051 | 38.35 | 27 | 1,006,264 | 36.69 | +7.60 | 15 | 42 | ▲9 |
| Free Democratic Party | 196,004 | 7.18 | 0 | 258,550 | 9.43 | +1.52 | 11 | 11 | ▲2 |
| Alliance 90/The Greens | 206,250 | 7.55 | 0 | 205,610 | 7.53 | -2.57 | 9 | 9 | ▼3 |
| The Left | 106,975 | 3.92 | 0 | 140,769 | 5.13 | New | 6 | 6 | New |
| The Republicans | 39,126 | 1.43 | 0 | 27,724 | 1.01 | -0.25 | 0 | 0 | 0 |
| Free Voters | 36,212 | 1.33 | 0 | 24,327 | 0.89 | New | 0 | 0 | New |
| National Democratic Party | 17,627 | 0.65 | 0 | 24,004 | 0.88 | New | 0 | 0 | New |
| Human Environment Animal Protection Party | 8,833 | 0.32 | 0 | 15,909 | 0.58 | -0.17 | 0 | 0 | 0 |
| Family Party | 1,243 | 0.05 | 0 | 7,817 | 0.28 | New | 0 | 0 | New |
| Pirate Party | – | | | 6,962 | 0.25 | New | 0 | 0 | New |
| The Grays – Gray Panthers | 717 | 0.03 | 0 | 4,810 | 0.18 | New | 0 | 0 | New |
| Alliance for Germany | 238 | 0.01 | 0 | 3,130 | 0.11 | New | 0 | 0 | New |
| The Violets | – | | | 2,380 | 0.09 | New | 0 | 0 | New |
| Independent Citizen Politics | 595 | 0.02 | 0 | 1,775 | 0.06 | New | 0 | 0 | New |
| Civil Rights Movement Soliarity | 361 | 0.01 | 0 | 1,118 | 0.04 | -0.02 | 0 | 0 | 0 |
| Socialist Equality Party | – | | | 1,035 | 0.04 | -0.01 | 0 | 0 | 0 |
| Independents | 595 | 0.02 | 0 | – | | | | 0 | 0 |
| Total | 2,730,185 | 100.00 | 55 | 2,742,599 | 100.00 | | 55 | 110 | 0 |
| Invalid | 80,888 | 2.88 | | 68,114 | 2.42 | | | | |
| Turnout | 2,811,073 | 64.32 | | 2,811,073 | 64.32 | -0.30 | | | |
| Registered voters | 4,370,463 | | | 4,370,463 | | | | | |

== Outcome ==
The CDU's share of the vote fell to its lowest level since the 1966 election. The SPD, under its leader Andrea Ypsilanti, increased its share of the vote substantially, from 29% to 37%; the SPD claimed victory as a result. The other winner was The Left, who narrowly entered the Hesse Landtag with 5.1% of the vote. This was the second western state legislature which the party had entered, the first being Bremen in 2007. The party also won seats in neighbouring Lower Saxony in an election held the same day.

The SPD and the CDU both won 42 seats; the FDP won 11 and the Greens 9. With 56 seats needed for a majority, neither was able to form a government with their traditional partners. There was a several-month-long lull after the election. The Left was thus kingmaker, exactly the result it had hoped for.

A traffic light coalition (SPD, FDP, Greens) would have held a majority (62), but was rejected by FDP, saying that they will only form a coalition with CDU or go into opposition.

SPD leader Ypsilanti had long refused to negotiate with The Left, but in October 2008 began talks to include them in a three-party "red-green-red" coalition with herself as Minister-President. This was a controversial move which sparked a revolt in the SPD, as many members bitterly refused to participate in power-sharing with The Left. One day before the election for Minister-President in the Landtag, four members of the SPD parliamentary group indicated they would not vote for her, and called a vote of no-confidence on her leadership. After this point, it became clear a red-red-green coalition was not viable. New elections were subsequently scheduled for January 2009.
