= 1983 Hessian state election =

German state election

- 25 September 1983

All 110 seats in the Landtag of Hesse 56 seats needed for a majority
- Turnout: 3,404,656 (83.5% ▼2.8pp)
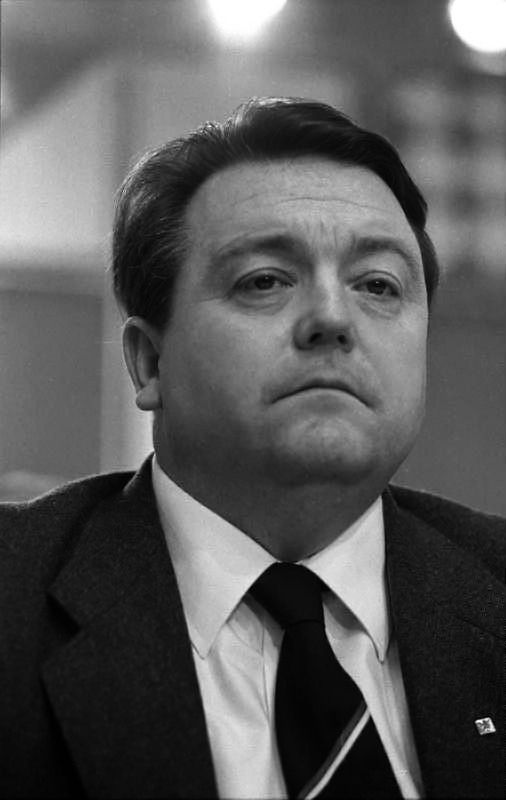

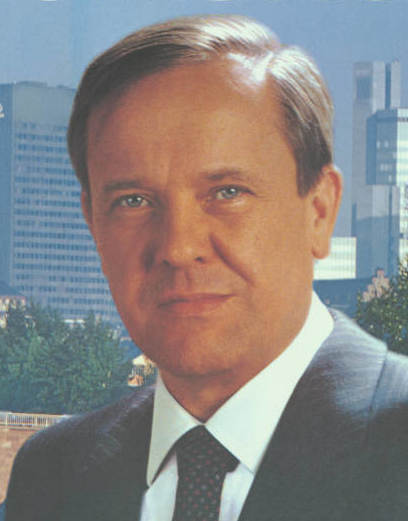

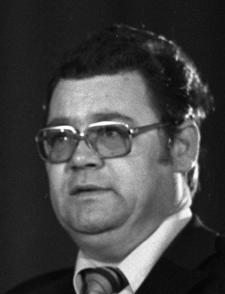
	First party	Second party
Candidate	Holger Börner	Walter Wallmann
Party	SPD	CDU
Last election	49 seats, 42.8%	52 seats, 45.6%
Seats won	51	44
Seat change	▲2	▼8
Popular vote	1,559,725	1,329,292
Percentage	46.2%	39.4%
Swing	▲3.4pp	▼6.2pp
	Third party	Fourth party
Candidate	Ekkehard Gries	Dirk Treber & Gertrud Schilling
Party	FDP	Greens
Last election	0 seats, 3.1%	9 seats, 8.0%
Seats won	8	7
Seat change	▲8	▼2
Popular vote	256,801	200,415
Percentage	7.6%	5.9%
Swing	▲4.5pp	▼2.1pp
- Results for the single-member constituencies.
Government before election
Second Börner cabinet
SPD
Government after election
Third Börner cabinet
SPD

The 1983 Hessian state election was held on 25 September 1983 to elect the 11th Landtag of Hesse. The outgoing government was a caretaker cabinet of the Social Democratic Party (SPD) led by Minister-President Holger Börner. The election was called after the Landtag's failure to elect a government after the 1982 election.

The snap election ended a prolonged political gridlock by making the SPD the largest party ahead of the Christian Democratic Union of Germany (CDU), though short of a majority. Following a historic 283-day cabinet formation process, Minister-President Holger Börner broke campaign promises and secured a confidence agreement with the Greens to form a minority government in June 1984. This arrangement ultimately evolved in October 1985 into Germany's first official red–green coalition.

== Electoral system ==
The Landtag was elected via mixed-member proportional representation. 55 members were elected in single-member constituencies via first-past-the-post voting, and 55 then allocated using compensatory proportional representation. A single ballot was used for both. An electoral threshold of 5% of valid votes is applied to the Landtag; parties that fall below this threshold are ineligible to receive seats.

== Background ==
The previous election, held on 26 September 1982, delivered an inconclusive result. Though the CDU and SPD remained first and second, respectively, with only slight losses, the FDP fell to 3% and lost their seats in the Landtag for the first time. At the same time, the new ecologist Green party entered with 8% and held the balance of power. The CDU offered to form a grand coalition, but Minister-President Börner refused and decided to continue his cabinet as a minority government, despite being the second largest party with no supporting partners. When the government's budget was defeated, Börner was forced to call early elections just a year after the last.

== Parties ==
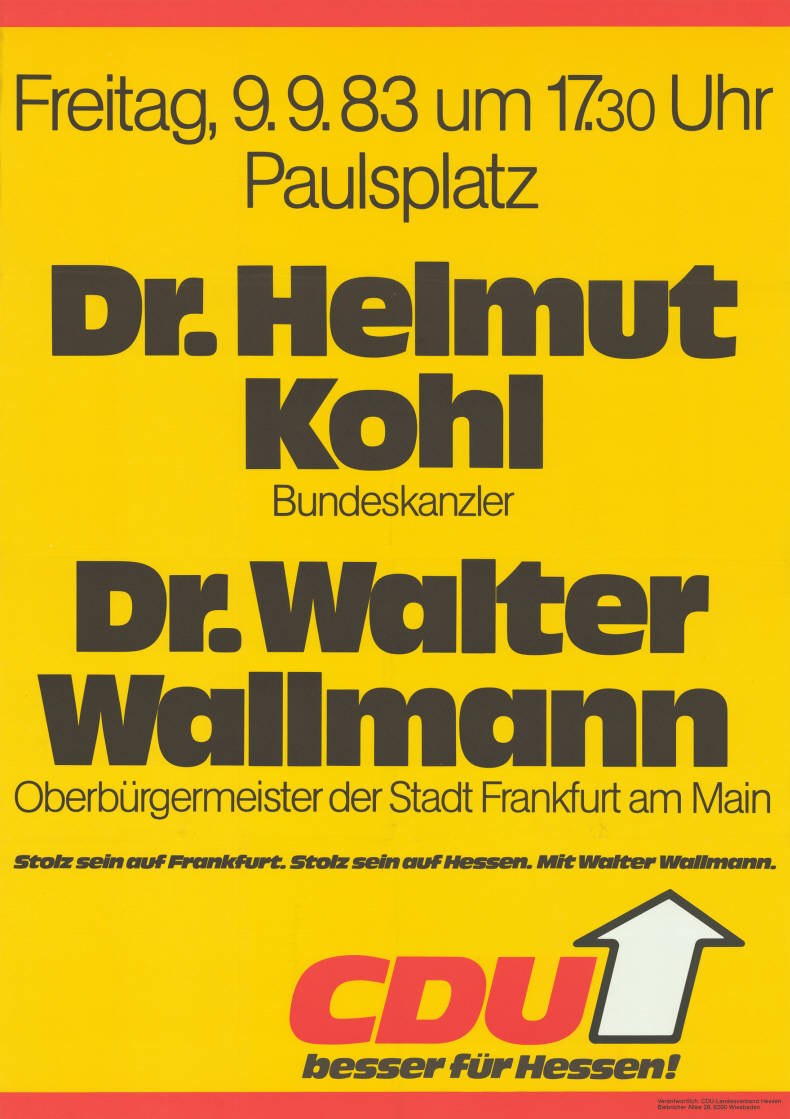
Poster for a rally in Frankfurt am Main held prior to the 1983 Hessian state elections, addressed by Kohl and Wallmann

The table below lists parties represented in the 10th Landtag of Hesse.

Name		Ideology	Lead candidate	1982 result	
Name		Ideology	Lead candidate	Votes (%)	Seats
CDU	Christian Democratic Union of Germany; Christlich Demokratische Union Deutschlands	Christian democracy	Walter Wallmann	45.6%	52 / 110
SPD	Social Democratic Party of Germany; Sozialdemokratische Partei Deutschlands	Social democracy	Holger Börner	42.8%	49 / 110
GRÜNE	The Greens; Die Grünen	Green politics	Dirk Treber & Gertrud Schilling	8.0%	9 / 110

== Election result ==
Party	Votes	%	Swing	Seats			
Party	Votes	%	Swing	Con.	List	Total	+/-
Social Democratic Party (SPD)	1,559,725	46.23	▲3.41	42	9	51	▲2
Christian Democratic Union (CDU)	1,329,292	39.40	▼6.22	13	31	44	▼8
Free Democratic Party (FDP)	256,802	7.61	▲4.53	0	8	8	▲8
The Greens (GRÜNE)	200,415	5.94	▼2.09	0	7	7	▼2
Liberal Democrats (LD)	13,553	0.40	New	0	0	0	New
German Communist Party (DKP)	8,697	0.26	▼0.11	0	0	0	0
Democratic Socialists (DS)	3,221	0.10	New	0	0	0	New
European Labour Party (EAP)	1,224	0.04	▼0.03	0	0	0	0
Foreigner Repatriation Action (AAR)	890	0.03	New	0	0	0	New
Federation of Socialist Workers (BSA)	35	0.00	New	0	0	0	New
Total	3,373,853	100.00		55	55	110	0
Invalid	30,803	0.90					
Turnout	3,404,656	83.54	▼2.83				
Registered voters	4,075,611						
