= Runway 18 West =

Runway at Frankfurt Airport

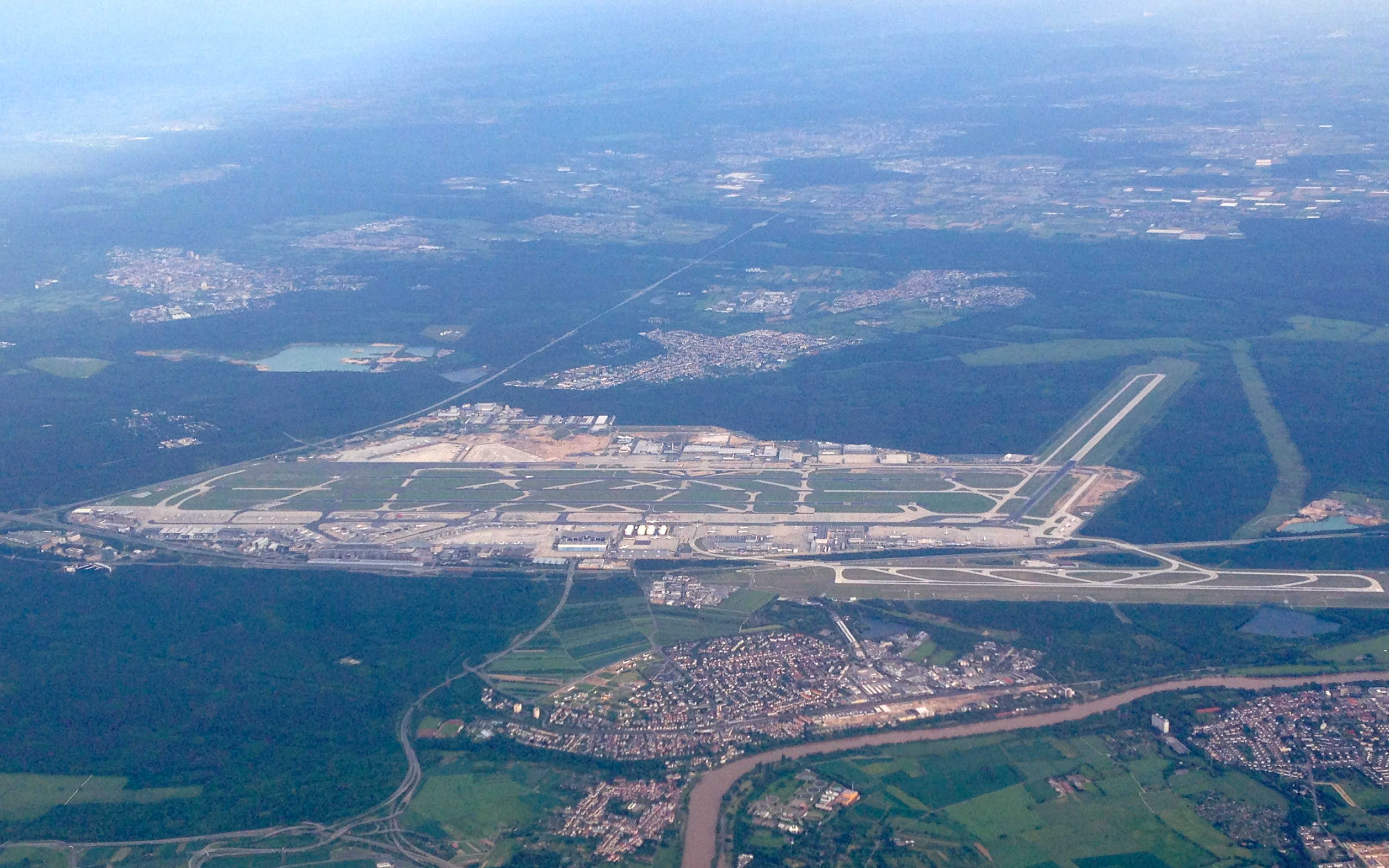
Frankfurt Airport with Runway 18 West on the right (photo taken June 2013 after construction of the Northwest Runway)

Runway 18 West (German Startbahn 18 West) is a 4000-meter-long runway that runs from north to south on the western edge of Frankfurt Airport. A small northern portion of the runway is located in the Frankfurt district of Flughafen, while the larger southern portion lies in the Rüsselsheim am Main district. Before going into operation in 1984, the runway met with considerable opposition, becoming an important symbol of the German environmental movement in the 1970s and 1980s.

== History ==
=== Planning ===
In 1962, Frankfurt Airport/Main AG, Frankfurt Rhein-Main Airport's operating company, decided to design a new arrivals terminal and a third runway. Dramatic growth in air traffic had pushed both the old airport buildings and adjoining railway system, which still exist to this day, to their limits. The Rhine-Main region was experiencing a steady economic upswing, thanks in no small part to the role played by Frankfurt Airport as a European airline hub.

Airport expansion was complicated because the site was completely surrounded by forests, including protected Bannwald areas. Other obstacles included the east-to-west Bundesautobahn 3 north of the airport, the north-to-south Bundesautobahn 5 to the east, an overhead power line to the west, and the now-closed U.S. Rhein-Main Air Base to the south. Only the southwest corner of the airport offered the possibility of building a new runway, running north to south. But this would entail both immense logging operations and extension of the airport to a municipal area not belonging to the Frankfurt metropolitan zone.

Economic factors took precedence over environmental considerations and on 28 December 1965, Flughafen AG applied for a construction permit for "Runway 18 West". In May 1966, the Hessian Parliament (Landtag) decided to build a new 4000-metre-long, north-south runway. Following the approval, Frankfurt Airport/Main AG decided in November 1967 to build the new runway at a cost of DM 78 million. At a time of increasing environmental awareness, more and more citizens grew skeptical about the airport expansion. Following planning approval by the Transportation Minister in March 1968, 44 legal actions for cancellation of the project (Anfechtungsklagen in German) were brought before the courts.

=== Lawsuits ===
Frankfurt Airport's Terminal Mitte (now Terminal 1) opened in March 1972 and the planning approval procedure for the new Runway 18 West was initiated the following year.

The result was more than 100 lawsuits brought before Hessian administrative courts. Runway opponents, who increasingly joined forces in citizens' initiatives (BI), were growing in number, as both reduced flights and the 1973 oil crisis mitigated the need for a new runway. Some runway opponents also feared it could be used by NATO.

Administrative courts dealt with the planned expansion for nearly a decade before construction approval was annulled for technical reasons. In March 1971, the Transportation Ministry issued a second planning approval order, which again ended up before the courts. At the end of 1978, a citizens' initiative (BI) against the expansion was founded, principally in the affected town of Mörfelden-Walldorf, but also in Frankfurt and areas surrounding the airport.

In July 1978, the Federal Administrative Court referred runway opponents' claims back to the Hessian Administrative Court. In December that year, the State of Hesse sold 303 hectares of land to Frankfurt Airport/Main AG for the construction of the new runway. The expected logging zone amounted to 129 hectares.

=== Intensification of the conflict ===
When the Hessian Administrative Court ruled in favor of the new runway construction on 21 October 1980, the legal dispute ended but resistance on the ground intensified.

On the planned site of Runway 18 West, opponents erected a citizens' initiative (BI) hut as of May 1980, using it as an information kiosk for people walking in the area. In July, Hessian Minister of Economics and Transport Heinz-Herbert Karry (FDP), ordered the "immediate implementation" of runway construction. In October however, the Hessian Administrative Court rejected this stop request, restoring the construction halt. Yet the first tree felling work began before the winter for technical reasons. First, a seven-hectare site was cleared directly at the airport site.

On 2 November 1980, 15,000 people, mainly environmentalists and students, as well as numerous elderly people from the region, demonstrated at the edge of the forest in Walldorf. Since planned occupation actions by protesters failed due to long-running police efforts, the citizens' initiative group decided to expand its "BI-Hütte" into a permanently inhabited village to be able to react more quickly and effectively to potential land seizure and clearing operations. As a result, several illegal huts were built, in addition to a hut church of the Walldorf parish, on airport grounds.

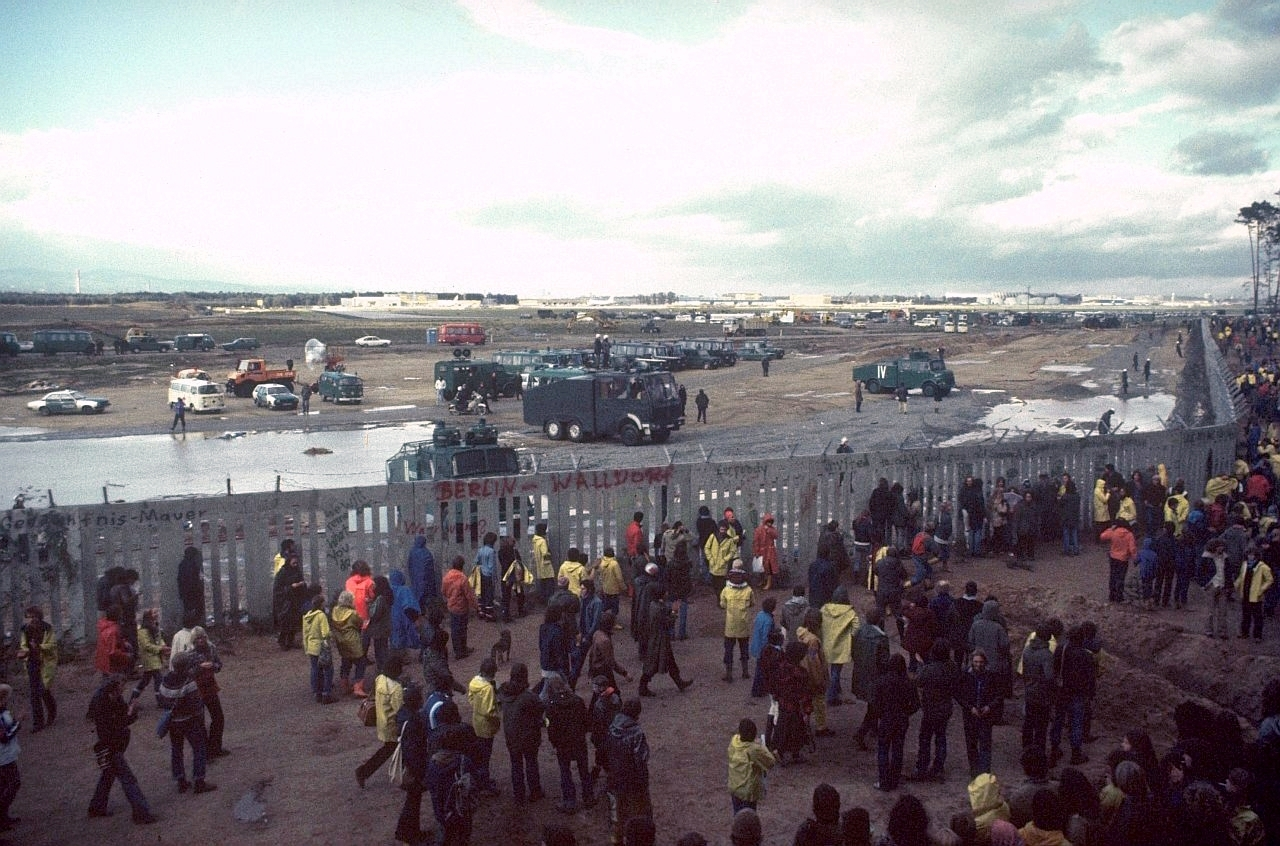
Concrete fence in front of the construction site

In May 1981, the Darmstadt city government president ordered that the site be seized. On 6 October, the previously cleared seven-hectare site was occupied by protesters then retaken by police. Hundreds had gathered on the site, excavated a triangular trench, and built a tower inside. The first hut village was evacuated on the morning of 2 November 1981; most protesters were removed peacefully. While the tower was more difficult to evacuate, squatters left it voluntarily the following evening. A few days after the site was cleared, a 2.5-metre-high concrete wall was erected to secure construction work.

While the hut village eviction itself was peaceful, thousands gathered in the woods outside police cordons during the day and several controversial police operations were carried out against the protesters. Late in the late evening of November 3, 1981, a police operation against an anti-runway demonstration took place on Rohrbachstraße in the Nordend district of Frankfurt, seriously injuring several demonstrators. After the removal of protesters, logging and construction work began under massive police protection. Repeated attacks by demonstrators took place against the concrete wall and police officers. Frequent attempts by runway opponents to build permanent hut villages were thwarted by the police.

A planned reoccupation of the Hüttendorf site on 7 November, after a rally attended by tens of thousands of protesters, was not carried out after disagreements within the movement over the question of violence. Instead of the planned mass crossing of the police cordons, fifty selected demonstrators with bare torsos were allowed onto the premises by police. In an event that would come to be called "Naked Saturday", four BI spokespersons then held an inconclusive discussion with Interior Minister Ekkehard Gries (FDP) on the cleared area of the hut village about halting the tree-felling work until a decision could be reached by the State Court. Another version of the day's events claims it was called Naked Saturday because many protesters were too lightly clothed for the colder-than-anticipated weather.

== Demonstrations ==
On 14 November 1981, over 120,000 people demonstrated in Wiesbaden against Runway 18 West. The Land returning officer was handed 220,000 signatures in support of a referendum. At the rally, Frankfurt Magistrate Director Alexander Schubart called for a "visit" to the airport the next day. The following day, runway opponents blocked airport entrances for hours. When the police used force against them, the demonstrators fled to the adjacent highway and erected barricades. In order to clear the motorway, the police deployed federal border protection units dispatched by helicopter.

For over a week, the city centre of Frankfurt and other cities in the Rhine-Main region were effectively shut down by daily protests. Police prevented protestors from occupying Frankfurt Central Station.

Alexander Schubart was sentenced to two years' imprisonment on probation for coercing the state government (Section 105, Section 125 and 240 StGB) and for his call for violence and discharged from the civil service. After ten years of legal battles, he was able to spend only eight months on probation and remain in the civil service.

The referendum request – the final remaining legal method to prevent runway construction – ended in 1982 with a decision by the Hessian Landtag under Minister-President Holger Börner (SPD), and rejection due to non-jurisdiction by the Hessian State Court.

In the following period, the runway movement, which had shrunk after the events of the autumn of 1981, primarily shifted to weekly "Sunday walks" to the concrete wall around the construction site. During these weekly demonstrations, repeated attempts were made to dismantle the wall, obstruct construction work, and attack police forces.

=== After construction ===
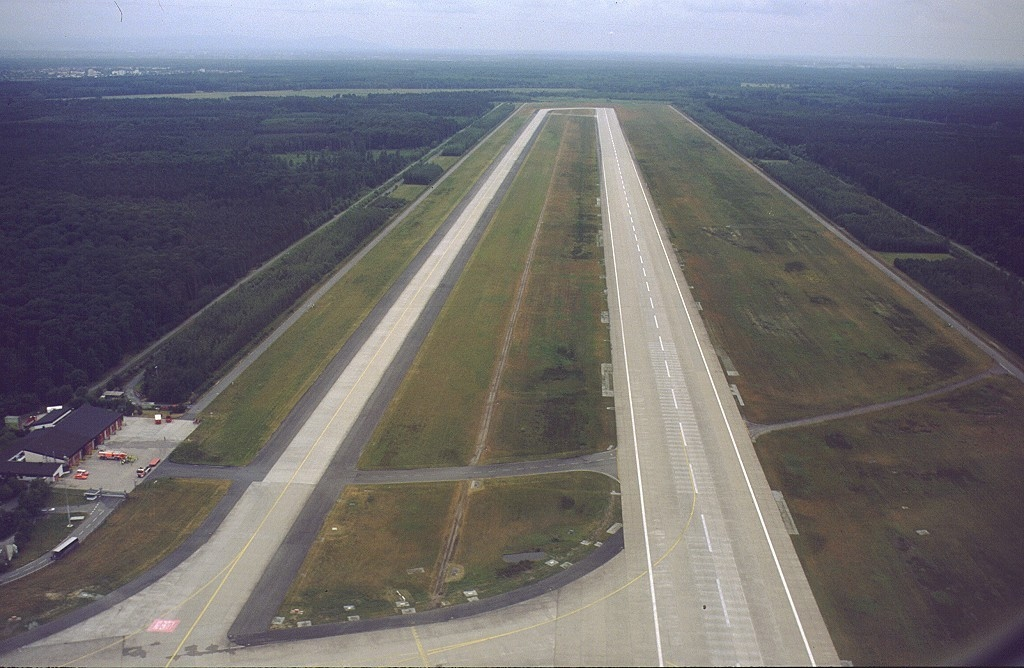
Runway 18 W from the north

On 12 April 1984, Runway 18 West began operating, although opening ceremonies were dispensed with. Two days later, approximately 15,000 people demonstrated against the commissioning of the runway at the perimeter wall in the forest.

On 2 November 1987, during a demonstration marking the sixth anniversary of the hut village evacuation, 14 police officers were shot at with a police firearm stolen from an earlier anti-nuclear demonstration in nearby Hanau on 8 November 1986. Nine police officers were hit, and officers Thorsten Schwalm and Klaus Eichhöfer were killed. The same night, a massive wave of searches and arrests began against the entire anti-runway movement. Runway opponents Andreas E. and Frank H. were indicted by the Federal Prosecutor's Office as the gunmen responsible for the two police deaths. Andreas E. was found guilty of manslaughter and sentenced to 15 years in prison. Frank H. was sentenced in 1991 to four and a half years in prison for offences unrelated to the fatal shootings. As a result of these events, the remnants of the protest movement against Runway 18 West fell apart.

In 2011, a fourth runway, the Northwest Runway, was built at Frankfurt Airport despite significant resistance from the public. A year after the fourth runway's construction, the website Airport Watch reported that weekly protests against the runway were occurring at the airport.

Initially, the original concrete perimeter wall remained as a relic of the Runway 18 West protests, a rare security barrier for a German airport in the period before September 11th. As of February 2018, the wall had been replaced with a modern, combined-wall-and-fence barrier, partly secured with NATO barbed wire. A section of the old wall, approximately 6 m long, has been preserved as a monument.

=== Flight specifications ===
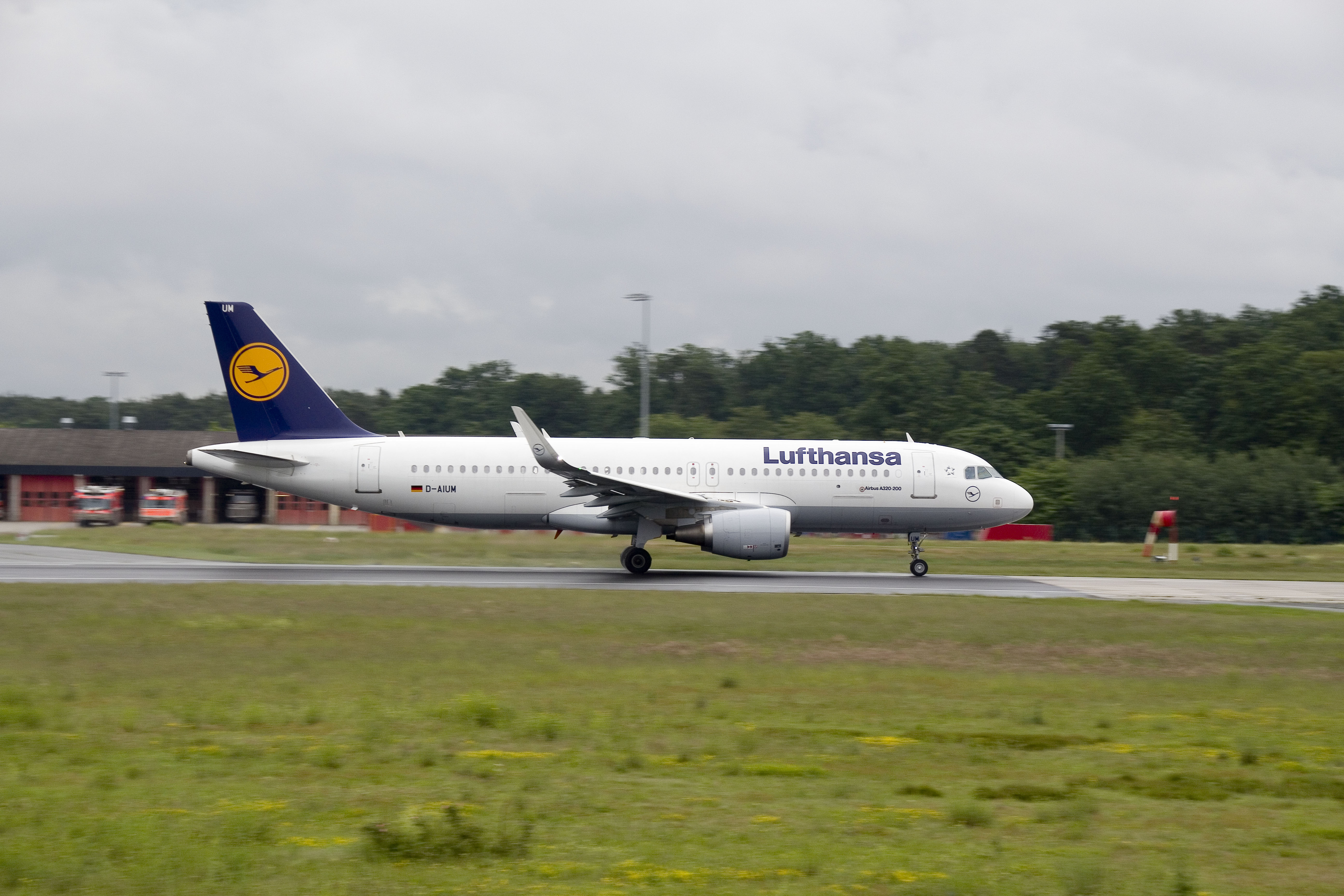
Lufthansa Airbus A320 readying for takeoff on Runway 18 West

Runway West is called '18' because it is faces almost exactly south, a course angle of 180 degrees. Because the Taunus Mountains prevent departures towards the north, only southbound takeoffs are permitted, in the direction of the Upper Rhine Plain. Since aircraft are supposed to take off against the wind, strong northerly winds limit or prevent takeoffs from the runway.

== Movies ==
- Keine Startbahn West – Trilogie eines Widerstandes (No Runway West - Trilogy of Resistance). 1981. Documentary film by Thomas Frickel and others.
- Keine Startbahn West – Eine Region wehrt sich (No Runway West - A Region Fights Back). 1982. Documentary film by Thomas Frickel and others.
- Wertvolle Jahre (Valuable years). 1989/90. Documentary film by Thomas Carlé and Gruscha Rode.

== Literature ==
- Wolf Wetzel: Tödliche Schüsse. Eine dokumentarische Erzählung (Deadly Shots. A Documentary Narrative). Unrast, Münster 2008, ISBN 978-3-89771-649-0.
- Horst Karasek: Das Dorf im Flörsheimer Wald. Eine Chronik gegen die Startbahn West (The Village in the Flörsheim Forest). A chronicle against the West runway. Luchterhand Verlag, Darmstadt/Neuwied 1981, ISBN 3-472-61368-8.
- Volker Luley: Trotzdem gehört uns der Wald! von einem, der auszog das Fürchten zu verlernen (Nevertheless, the Forest Belongs to Us! From Someone Who Set Out to Unlearn Fear). Saalbau Verlag, Offenbach 1981, ISBN 3-922-879-08-X.
- Bruno Struif (ed.): Kunst gegen StartbahnWest. Arbeiten von Betroffenen (Art vs. Runway West. Work of Those Affected). Anabas, casting 1982, ISBN 3-87038-094-2.
- Ulrich Cremer: Bauen als Urerfahrung: dargestellt am Beispiel des Hüttendorfes gegen die Startbahn West (Building as a Primal Experience: Illustrated by the Example of the Hut Village Against Runway West). E. Weiss Verlag, Munich 1982, ISBN 3-88753-009-8.
