= Norbert Kartmann =

German politician (1949–2026)

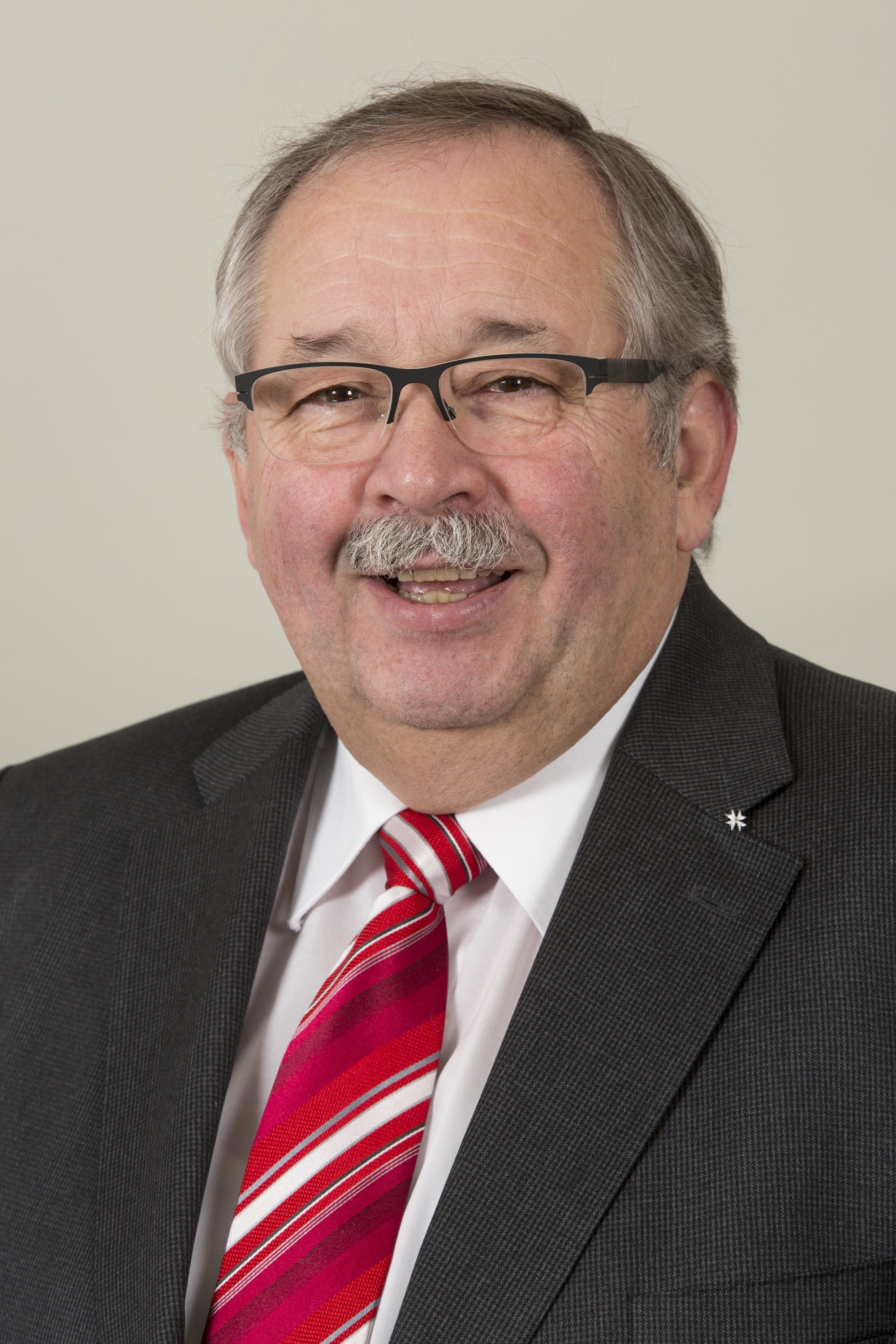
- Kartmann in 2013

President of the Landtag of Hesse
- In office 5 April 2003 – 17 January 2019
- Preceded by: Klaus Peter Möller
- Succeeded by: Boris Rhein

Member of the Landtag of Hesse
- In office 1 December 1982 – 31 December 2022

Personal details
- Born: 16 January 1949 Butzbach, Hesse, Allied-occupied Germany
- Died: 23 May 2026 (aged 77) Lich, Hesse, Germany
- Party: CDU
- Occupation: Teacher

Norbert Kartmann (16 January 1949 – 23 May 2026) was a German politician. A member of the Christian Democratic Union, he served in the Landtag of Hesse from 1982 to 2022 and was its president from 2003 to 2019.

Kartmann died in Lich on 23 May 2026, at the age of 77.
