= 1982 Hessian state election =

German state election

← 1978	26 September 1982	1983 →

All 110 seats in the Landtag of Hesse 56 seats needed for a majority
- Turnout: 3,498,407 (86.4% ▼1.3pp)
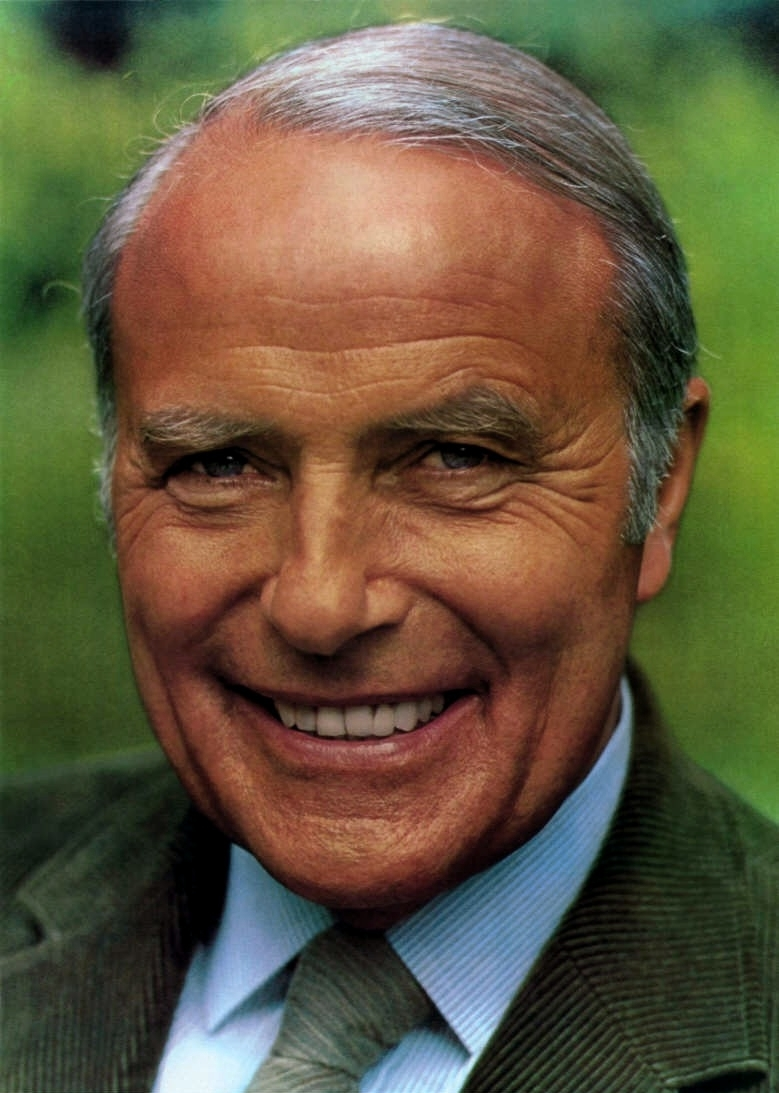

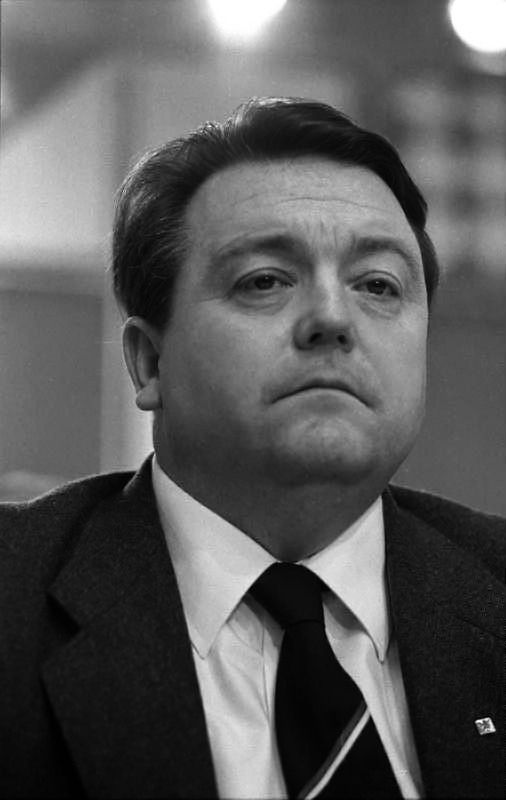

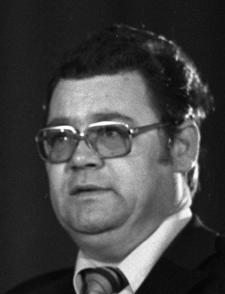
	First party	Second party
Candidate	Alfred Dregger	Holger Börner
Party	CDU	SPD
Last election	53 seats, 46.0%	50 seats, 44.3%
Seats won	52	49
Seat change	▼1	▼1
Popular vote	1,580,989	1,483,930
Percentage	45.6%	42.8%
Swing	▼0.4pp	▼1.5pp
	Third party	Fourth party
Candidate	Dirk Treber & Gertrud Schilling	Ekkehard Gries
Party	Greens	FDP
Last election	0 seats, 2.0% (Note: Aggregate of Green List Hesse (1.1%) and Green Action Future (0.9%).)	7 seats, 6.6%
Seats won	9	0
Seat change	▲9	▼7
Popular vote	278,450	106,901
Percentage	8.0%	4.1%
Swing	▲6.0pp	▼3.5pp
- Results for the single-member constituencies.
Government before election
Second Börner cabinet
SPD–FDP
Government after election
Second Börner cabinet
SPD

The 1982 Hessian state election was held on 26 September 1982 to elect the 10th Landtag of Hesse. The outgoing government was a coalition of the Social Democratic Party (SPD) and Free Democratic Party (FDP) led by Minister-President Holger Börner.

The election produced an inconclusive result, with neither the SPD nor the opposition Christian Democratic Union (CDU) achieving a majority. The FDP, who during the campaign voted to end cooperation with the SPD and opt for a coalition with the CDU post-election, fell below the 5% electoral threshold and lost their representation in the Landtag for the first time. Balance of power was held by the new Green party, who won 8%. As neither party was willing to work with the Greens, Holger Börner attempted to continue in office as a minority government; however, his budget was defeated in the Landtag and new elections were called just a year later in 1983.

== Electoral system ==
The Landtag was elected via mixed-member proportional representation. 55 members were elected in single-member constituencies via first-past-the-post voting, and 55 then allocated using compensatory proportional representation. A single ballot was used for both. An electoral threshold of 5% of valid votes is applied to the Landtag; parties that fall below this threshold are ineligible to receive seats.

== Background ==
In the previous election held on 8 October 1978, the incumbent SPD–FDP coalition retained its majority and was renewed for a third term. The CDU remained the largest party, though there was a small swing from them to the SPD. Two small green parties ran for the first time and finished with about 1% each, becoming the largest non-parliamentary parties in the state. They federated into the new national party The Greens in 1980, which ran for the first time in 1982.

== Parties ==
The table below lists parties represented in the 9th Landtag of Hesse.

Name		Ideology	Lead candidate	1978 result	
Name		Ideology	Lead candidate	Votes (%)	Seats
CDU	Christian Democratic Union of Germany; Christlich Demokratische Union Deutschlands	Christian democracy	Alfred Dregger	46.0%	53 / 110
SPD	Social Democratic Party of Germany; Sozialdemokratische Partei Deutschlands	Social democracy	Holger Börner	44.2%	50 / 110
FDP	Free Democratic Party; Freie Demokratische Partei	Classical liberalism	Ekkehard Gries	6.6%	7 / 110

== Results ==
Party	Votes	%	+/–	Seats			
Party	Votes	%	+/–	Con.	List	Total	+–
Christian Democratic Union	1,580,989	45.62	–0.40	33	19	52	–1
Social Democratic Party	1,483,930	42.82	+1.47	22	27	49	–1
The Greens	278,450	8.03	+6.03	0	9	9	+9
Free Democratic Party	106,901	3.08	–3.49	0	0	0	–7
German Communist Party	12,625	0.36	–0.06	0	0	0	0
European Workers' Party	2,377	0.07	+0.05	0	0	0	0
Independents	221	0.01	+0.01	0	–	0	0
Total	3,465,493	100.00	–	55	55	110	0
Valid votes	3,465,493	99.06					
Invalid/blank votes	32,914	0.94					
Total votes	3,498,407	100.00					
Registered voters/turnout	4,050,661	86.37					
