= 1983 West German federal election =

← 1980	6 March 1983	1987 →

All 498 seats in the Bundestag (Note: As well as the 22 non-voting delegates for West Berlin, elected by the West Berlin Legislature.) 250 seats needed for a majority
- Registered: 44,088,935 ▲2.0%
- Turnout: 39,279,529 (89.1%) ▲0.5 pp
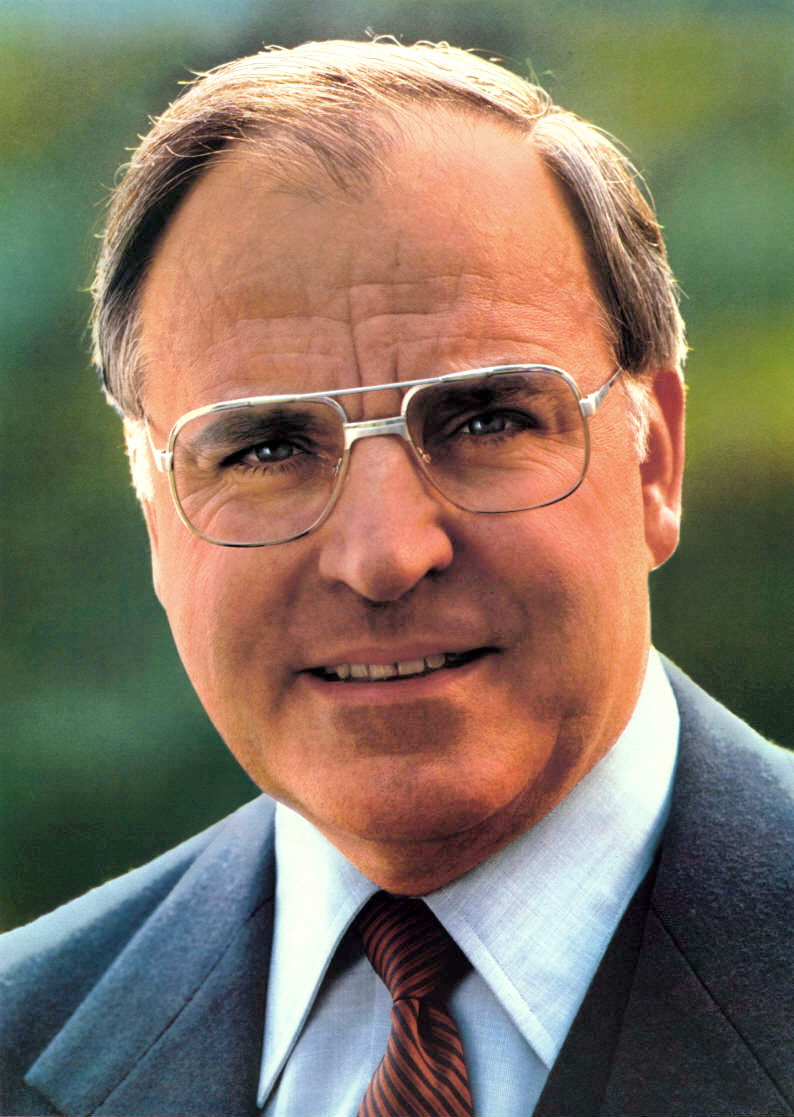

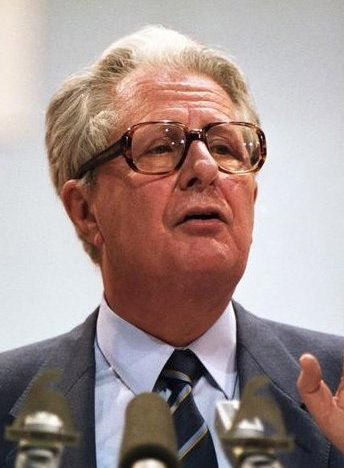

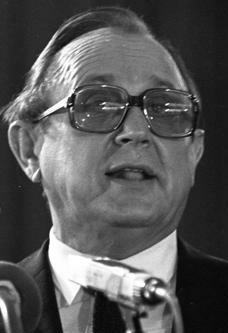

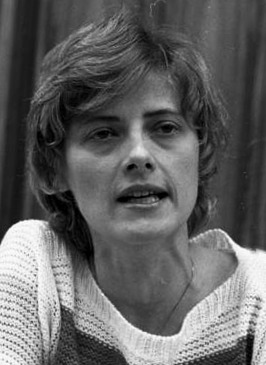
	First party	Second party
Candidate	Helmut Kohl	Hans-Jochen Vogel
Party	CDU/CSU	SPD
Last election	44.5%, 226 seats	42.9%, 218 seats
Seats won	244 (Note: As well as 11 non-voting delegates for West Berlin.)	193 (Note: As well as 9 non-voting delegates for West Berlin.)
Seat change	▲18	▼25
Popular vote	18,998,545	14,865,807
Percentage	48.8%	38.2%
Swing	▲4.3 pp	▼4.7 pp
	Third party	Fourth party
Candidate	Hans-Dietrich Genscher	Petra Kelly
Party	FDP	Greens
Last election	10.6%, 53 seats	1.5%, 0 seats
Seats won	34 (Note: As well as 1 non-voting delegate for West Berlin.)	27 (Note: As well as 1 non-voting delegate for West Berlin.)
Seat change	▼19	▲27
Popular vote	2,706,942	2,167,431
Percentage	6.9%	5.6%
Swing	▼3.7 pp	▲4.1 pp
- The left side shows constituency winners of the election by their party colours. The right side shows party list winners of the election for the additional members by their party colours.
Government before election
First Kohl cabinet
CDU/CSU-FDP
Government after election
Second Kohl cabinet
CDU/CSU-FDP

A federal election was held in West Germany on 6 March 1983 to elect the members of the 10th Bundestag. The CDU/CSU alliance led by Helmut Kohl remained the largest faction in parliament, with Kohl remaining Chancellor.

== Issues and campaign ==
The SPD/FDP coalition under Chancellor Helmut Schmidt was returned to power in the 1980 West German federal election. The coalition parties grew more and more apart over economic policies. Schmidt asked for and won a motion of no confidence on 5 February 1982. The FDP cabinet ministers resigned on 17 September 1982 and the SPD formed a minority government. On 1 October, Schmidt and the SPD government were dismissed from office by a constructive vote of no confidence by the votes of the CDU/CSU Union parties and a majority of the FDP deputies in the Bundestag. The Leader of the Christian Democratic Union and Leader of the CDU/CSU Group in the Bundestag Helmut Kohl succeeded Schmidt. The new coalition had a majority in the Bundestag but early elections were arranged to legitimize it. Neither the Bundestag itself nor the Chancellor has a right to dissolve the Bundestag, so Kohl did this by deliberately losing a vote of no confidence on 17 December 1982. Federal President Karl Carstens then dissolved the Bundestag and held new elections. The Federal Constitutional Court upheld the constitutionality of the dissolution.

The FDP was split by its change of coalition partners. The party leadership under Hans-Dietrich Genscher and Otto Graf Lambsdorff drove the new policy, but they were rejected by a minority under Gerhart Baum, Günter Verheugen and Ingrid Matthäus-Maier. The FDP was defeated in the 1982 Hessian state election on 26 September 1982, losing half its voters by gaining only 3.1 percent of the vote and failing to enter the state parliament thanks to an SPD campaign against the FDP's "betrayal in Bonn". The FDP was defeated again and lost all of its seats in the 1982 Bavarian state election on 10 October 1982.

Helmut Schmidt renounced his chancellor candidacy and was replaced by former Federal Minister of Justice Hans-Jochen Vogel. The SPD encountered difficulties because of the emergence of the Greens. A major issue in this election was the armament question after the NATO Double-Track Decision, something the SPD was deeply split on.

== Results ==
Party	Party-list			Constituency			Seats			
Party	Votes	%	Seats	Votes	%	Seats	Elected	West Berlin	Total	+/–
Social Democratic Party	14,865,807	38.18	125	15,686,033	40.38	68	193	9	202	–26
Christian Democratic Union	14,857,680	38.15	55	15,943,460	41.04	136	191	11	202	+17
Christian Social Union	4,140,865	10.63	9	4,318,800	11.12	44	53	0	53	+1
Free Democratic Party	2,706,942	6.95	34	1,087,918	2.80	0	34	1	35	–19
The Greens	2,167,431	5.57	27	1,609,855	4.14	0	27	1	28	+28
National Democratic Party	91,095	0.23	0	57,112	0.15	0	0	0	0	0
German Communist Party	64,986	0.17	0	96,143	0.25	0	0	0	0	0
European Workers' Party	14,966	0.04	0	7,491	0.02	0	0	0	0	0
Ecological Democratic Party	11,028	0.03	0	3,341	0.01	0	0	0	0	New
Christian Bavarian People's Party	10,994	0.03	0	2,068	0.01	0	0	0	0	0
Communist Party of Germany/Marxists–Leninists	3,431	0.01	0				0	0	0	New
Independent Social Democrats	3,333	0.01	0	450	0.00	0	0	0	0	New
League of West German Communists	2,129	0.01	0	686	0.00	0	0	0	0	New
Independents and voter groups				31,996	0.08	0	0	0	0	0
Total	38,940,687	100.00	250	38,845,353	100.00	248	498	22	520	+1
Valid votes	38,940,687	99.14		38,845,353	98.89					
Invalid/blank votes	338,841	0.86		434,176	1.11					
Total votes	39,279,528	100.00		39,279,529	100.00					
Registered voters/turnout	44,088,935	89.09		44,088,935	89.09					
Source: Bundeswahlleiter

Seat results – SPD in red, Greens in green, FDP in yellow, CDU/CSU in black

=== Results by state ===
==== Constituency seats ====
State	Total seats	Seats won		
State	Total seats	CDU	SPD	CSU
Baden-Württemberg	37	36	1	
Bavaria	45		1	44
Bremen	3		3	
Hamburg	7		7	
Hesse	22	17	5	
Lower Saxony	31	21	10	
North Rhine-Westphalia	71	39	32	
Rhineland-Palatinate	16	11	5	
Saarland	5	3	2	
Schleswig-Holstein	11	9	2	
Total	248	136	68	44

==== List seats ====
State	Total seats	Seats won				
State	Total seats	SPD	CDU	FDP	Grüne	CSU
Baden-Württemberg	37	22	3	7	5	
Bavaria	44	25		6	4	9
Bremen	2		2			
Hamburg	6		5		1	
Hesse	26	15	4	4	3	
Lower Saxony	32	16	8	4	4	
North Rhine-Westphalia	75	31	26	10	8	
Rhineland-Palatinate	15	7	5	2	1	
Saarland	3	2	1			
Schleswig-Holstein	10	7	1	1	1	
Total	250	125	55	34	27	9

== Post-election ==
The coalition between the CDU/CSU and the FDP returned to government, gaining 55.7% of the vote and 55.8% of the seats, with Helmut Kohl as Chancellor. This was the first election in which the Greens secured representation in the Bundestag, and the first which saw a fourth (fifth) party in the parliament since 1960.

== Sources ==
- The Federal Returning Officer
- Psephos
