= List of presidents of the Landtag of Hesse =

The following is a list of presidents of the Landtag of Hesse.

== Presidents of the Landtag of the People's State of Hesse ==
Name	Period	Party
Bernhard Adelung	1919–1928	SPD
Heinrich Delp	1928–1931	SPD
Ferdinand Werner	1931–1933	NSDAP
Philipp Jung	1933	NSDAP

== President of the Beratende Landesauschuss ==
Name	Period	Party
Otto Witte	1946	SPD

== President of the Verfassunggebende Landesversammlung ==
Name	Period	Party
Otto Witte	1946	SPD

== Presidents of the Landtag ==
Name	Period	Party
Otto Witte	July 15, 1946 – December 15, 1954	SPD
Heinrich Zinnkann	December 16, 1954 – November 30, 1962	SPD
Franz Fuchs	December 1, 1962 – November 30, 1966	SPD
Georg Buch	December 1, 1966 – December 3, 1974	SPD
Hans Wagner	December 3, 1974 – November 30, 1982	CDU
Jochen Lengemann	December 1, 1982 – October 13, 1983	CDU
Erwin Lang	October 13, 1983 – April 23, 1987	SPD
Jochen Lengemann	April 23, 1987 – July 22, 1987	CDU
Klaus Peter Möller	July 25, 1987 – April 4, 1988	CDU
Karl Starzacher	April 5, 1991 – April 4, 1995	SPD
Klaus Peter Möller	April 5, 1995 – April 4, 2003	CDU
Norbert Kartmann	April 5, 2003 - January 17, 2019	CDU
Boris Rhein	January 18, 2019-Incumbent	CDU

== See also ==
- List of presidents of the First Chamber of the States of the Grand Duchy of Hesse
- List of presidents of the Second Chamber of the States of the Grand Duchy of Hesse
