= Michael Ruhl =

German politician (born 1984)

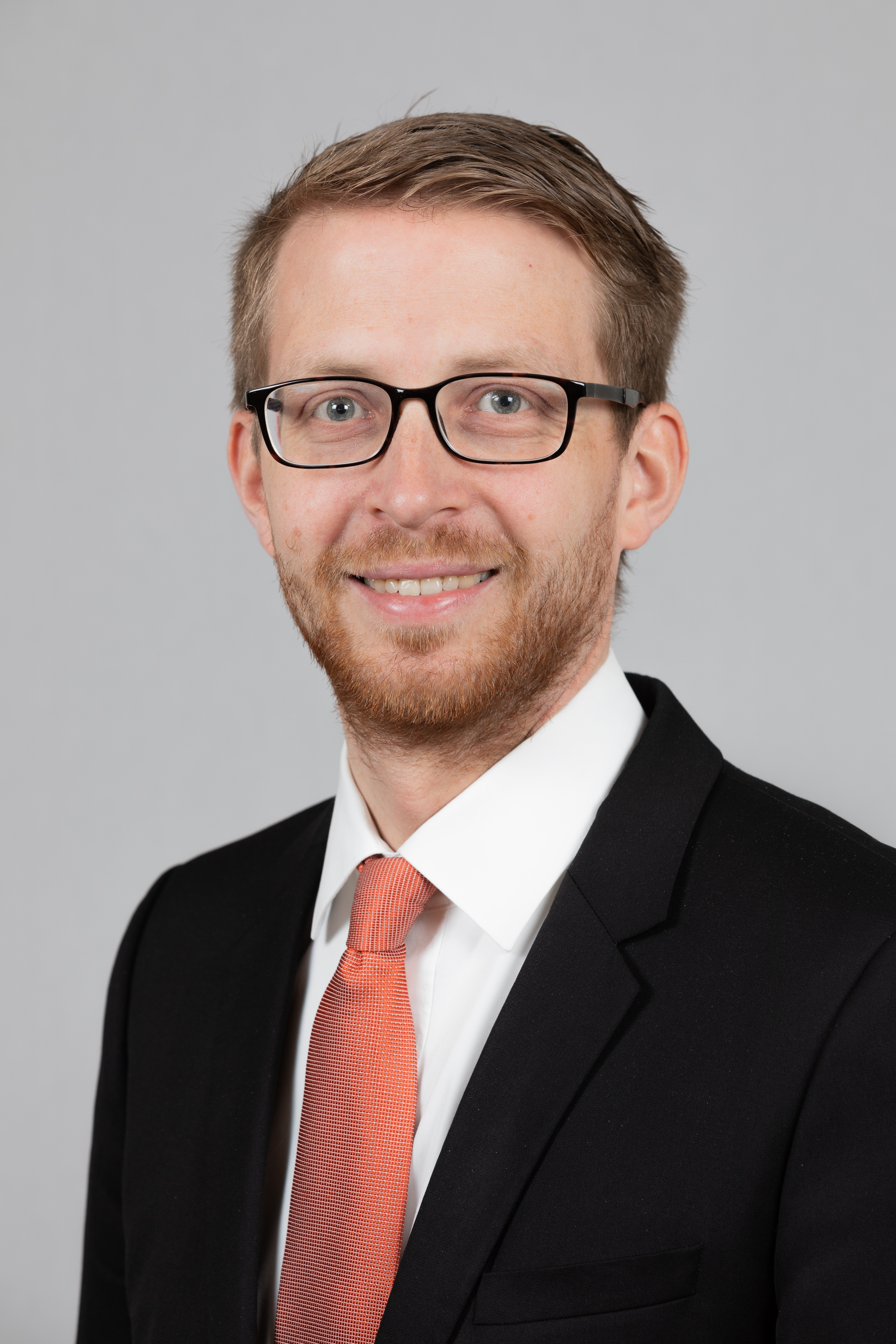
- Ruhl in 2019

Member of the Landtag of Hesse
- In office 18 January 2019 – 18 January 2024
- Preceded by: Kurt Wiegel
- Succeeded by: Jennifer Gießler
- Constituency: Vogelsberg

Personal details
- Born: 29 September 1984 (age 41)
- Party: Christian Democratic Union (since 2002)

Michael Ruhl (born 29 September 1984) is a German politician serving as state secretary of agriculture and environment of Hesse since 2024. From 2019 to 2024, he was a member of the Landtag of Hesse.
