= Astrid Wallmann =

German politician (born 1979)

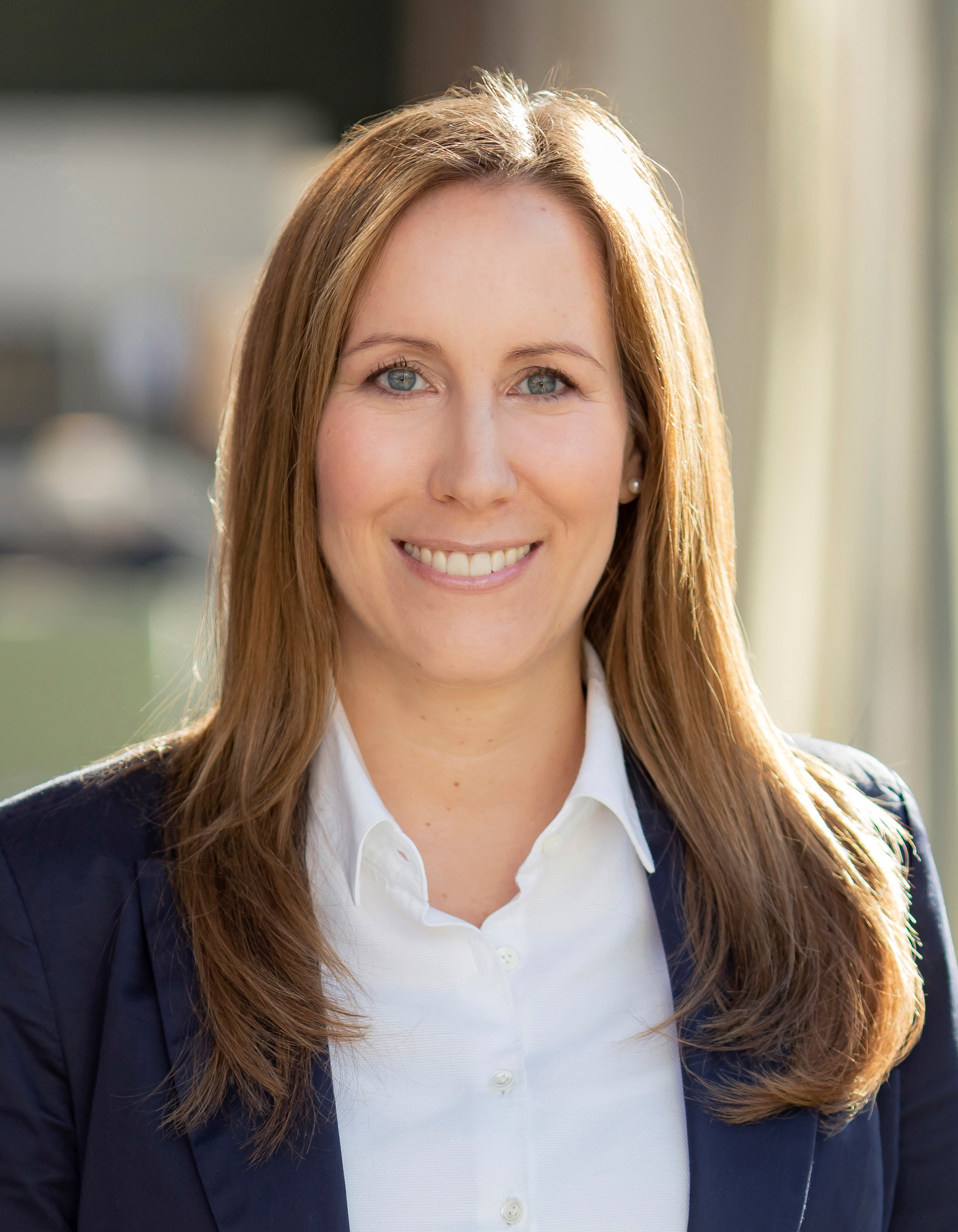
- Wallmann in 2019

President of the Landtag of Hesse
- Incumbent
- Assumed office 31 May 2022
- Preceded by: Boris Rhein

Personal details
- Born: 15 August 1979 (age 46)
- Party: Christian Democratic Union

Astrid Wallmann (born 15 August 1979) is a German politician serving as a member of the Landtag of Hesse since 2009. She has served as president of the Landtag since 2022.
