= Jennifer Gießler =

German politician (born 1993)

Member of the Landtag of Hesse
- Incumbent
- Assumed office 19 January 2024
- Preceded by: Michael Ruhl
- Constituency: Vogelsberg

Personal details
- Born: 16 October 1993 (age 32)
- Party: Christian Democratic Union

Jennifer Gießler (born 16 October 1993) is a German politician serving as a member of the Landtag of Hesse since 2024. She has served as chairwoman of the Christian Democratic Union in Lauterbach since 2024.
