= Karl Hillebrand =

German author (1829–1884)

Karl Hillebrand (17 September 1829 - 19 October 1884) was a German writer.

== Biography ==
He was born at Gießen, the son of Joseph Hillebrand, a literary historian and writer on philosophy.

Karl Hillebrand became involved, as a student in Heidelberg, in the Baden revolutionary movement, and was imprisoned in Rastatt in 1849. He succeeded in escaping and lived for a time in Strassburg, Paris—where for several months he was Heinrich Heine's secretary—and Bordeaux. He continued his studies, and after obtaining the doctor's degree at the Sorbonne, he was appointed teacher of German in the École militaire at St Cyr, and shortly afterwards, professor of foreign literature at Douai.

On the outbreak of the Franco-German War, he resigned his professorship and acted for a time as correspondent to The Times in Italy. He then settled in Florence, where he died on 19 October 1884.

== Writings ==
Hillebrand wrote with facility and elegance in French, English, and Italian, besides his own language. His essays, collected under the title Zeiten, Völker und Menschen (Berlin, 1874-1885), show clear discernment, a finely balanced cosmopolitan judgment, and grace of style.

He undertook to write the Geschichte Frankreichs von der Thronbesteigung Ludwig Philipps bis zum Fall Napoleons III, but only two volumes were completed (to 1848) (2nd edition, 1881–1882). In French he published Des conditions de la bonne comédie (1863), La Prusse contemporaine (1867), Études italiennes (1868), and a translation of O. Müller's Griechische Literaturgeschichte (3rd edition, 1883).

In English, he published Public Instruction in the United States (1869) and his Royal Institution Lectures on German Thought during the Last Two Hundred Years (1880). He also edited a collection of essays dealing with Italy, under the title Italia (4 volumes, Leipzig, 1874-1877).
