= Walter Wallmann =

German politician (1932–2013)

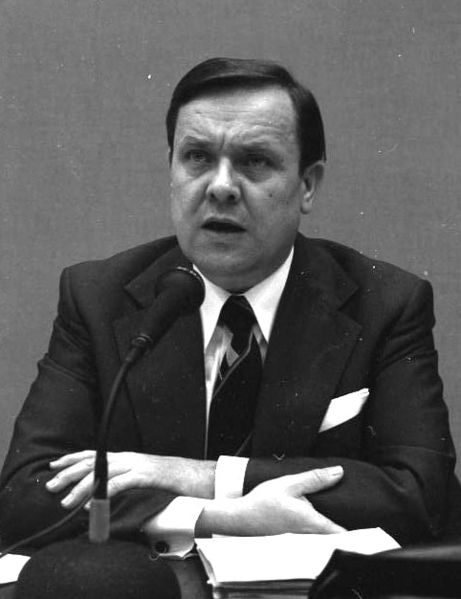

Mayor of Frankfurt
- In office 1977–1986
- Preceded by: Rudi Arndt
- Succeeded by: Wolfram Brück

Minister President of Hesse
- In office 23 April 1987 – 5 April 1991
- Preceded by: Holger Börner
- Succeeded by: Hans Eichel

President of the Bundesrat
- In office 15 May 1987 – 31 October 1987
- Preceded by: Holger Börner
- Succeeded by: Bernhard Vogel

Personal details
- Born: 24 September 1932 Uelzen, Prussia, Germany
- Died: 21 September 2013 (aged 80) Frankfurt, Germany
- Party: CDU

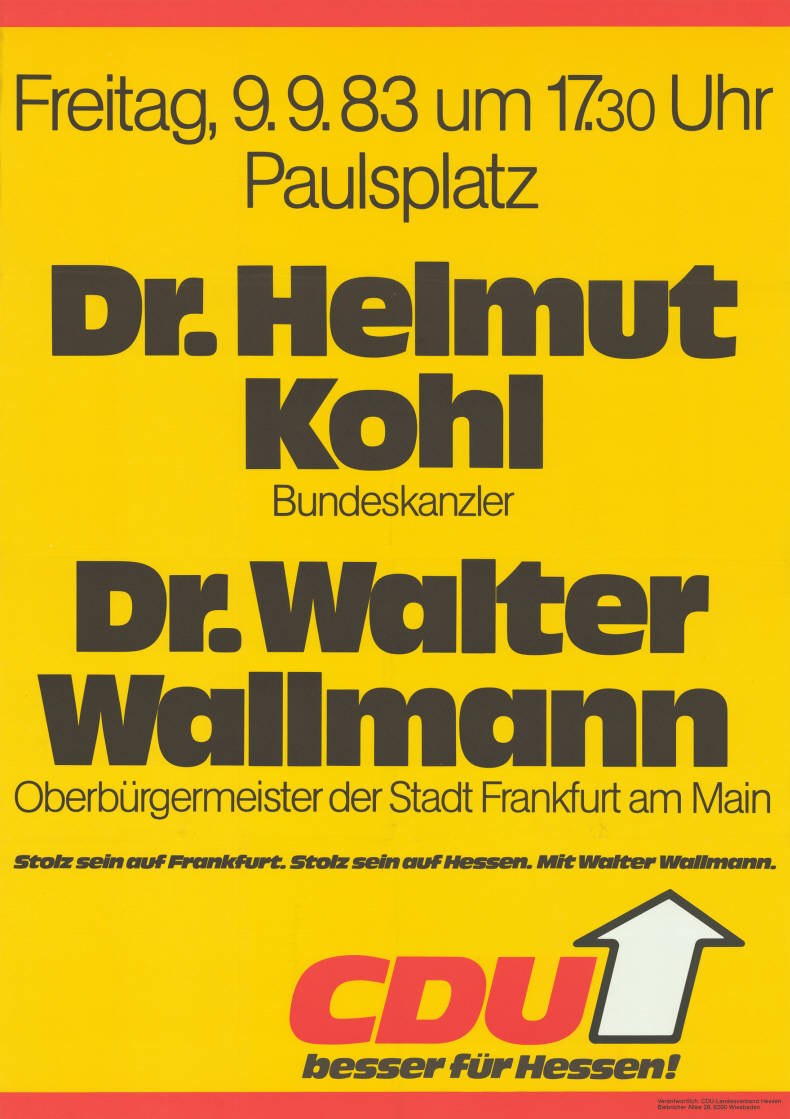
Poster for a rally prior to the 1983 Hessian state election, addressed by Kohl and Wallmann

Walter Wallmann (24 September 1932 – 21 September 2013) was a German lawyer and politician of the Christian Democratic Union (CDU). He served as the Mayor of Frankfurt between 1977 and 1986, and as Minister-president of Hesse from 1987 to 1991.

In 1966 and 1970, he was elected to the Landtag of Hesse from the CDU party list, before resigning in 1972 upon being elected to Bundestag, and again being elected in 1976.

In 1977, Wallmann resigned his Bundestag mandate upon CDU winning a majority in Frankfurt's urban elections to become the Mayor of Frankfurt (at the time, the mayor was not directly elected). Frankfurt had been governed by SPD since the end of World War II, so the election marked a turning point with CDU winning an absolute majority in the city elections. This was largely regarded as backlash to the SPD's urban policies (Frankfurter Häuserkampf), primarily directed against land speculation in the city's west end and possible gentrification, also his predecessor Rudi Arndt (SPD) had been willing to dynamite the rubbish of the World War II ruins of the Alte Oper opera house to build a modern office building on the site instead. CDU was also helped by local SPD's party donations' scandal, and Frankfurt suffering from a high crime rate, being dubbed as Bankfurt and Krankfurt (krank meaning sick in German) in the media.

Between 1986 and 1987 he was the first Federal Minister for Environment, Nature Conservation and Nuclear Safety. The ministry was established by chancellor Helmut Kohl on 6 June 1986 in response to the Chernobyl disaster and formed from departments of the Ministries of the Interior, of Agriculture and of Health. Important state regulations during his tenure were the change of the car tax law for the introduction of low emission cars and the detergent Act of 5 March 1987.

He left the Federal Ministry for Environment to become the 5th Minister President of Hesse (1987–1991). As Minister-President he also served as the 39th President of the Bundesrat from May to October 1987. He was a member of the Christian Democratic Union.

Political offices
Preceded by Holger Börner (SPD)	Minister-President of Hesse; 1987–1991	Succeeded by Hans Eichel (SPD)
