= List of presidents of the Second Chamber of the States of the Grand Duchy of Hesse =

The President of the Second Chamber of the States of the Grand Duchy of Hesse was the presiding officer of the lower chamber of that legislature.

Name	Period
Rudolf Eickemeyer	1820
Karl Christian Eigenbrodt	1820–1823
Friedrich Knapp	1823–1826
Ernst Schenck	1826–1833
Moritz Schmitt	June 1834
Karl Christian Eigenbrodt	1835–1839
Ernst Schenk	1839–1846
Andreas von Hesse	1846–1849
Joseph Hillebrand	1849–1850
Martin Mohr	1850
Wilhelm Goldmann	1851–1856
Friedrich Lotheissen	1856–1859
Friedrich Ludwig Klipstein	1859–1862
August Strecker	1862–1865
Wilhelm Gottlieb Soldan	1865–1866
Georg Buff	1866–1872
Carl Johann Hoffmann	1872–1874
Joseph Görz	1874–1879
August Kugler	1879–1892
Hermann Weber	1892–1896
Wilhelm Haas	1897–1911
Heinrich Köhler	1911–1918

== Sources ==
- Ruppel, Hans Georg and Groß, Birgit: Hessische Abegeordnete 1820–1930, Düsseldorf 1980, ISBN 3-922316-14-X
