= Joseph Hillebrand =

Joseph Hillebrand (24 August 1788 in Großdüngen (near Hildesheim) – 25 January 1871 in Bad Soden am Taunus) was a German novelist, philosopher and historian of literature.

== Biography ==
He was originally a Catholic, studied at Hildesheim and at Göttingen, and in 1815 entered the priesthood and taught at Hildesheim, but resigned his position on accepting Protestant views. Upon Hegel's departure from the University of Heidelberg in 1818, he was appointed a professor of philosophy there, and in 1822 took a like position at the University of Giessen. He was elected to the lower house of the Hessian chamber in 1847, where he took the side of the liberals and became president in 1848. When the sharp reaction after the revolutions of 1848 in Germany set in after July 1850, he was dismissed from his professorship and retired.

His most important work in the field of literary history was Die deutsche Nationallitteratur seit dem Anfang des 18. Jahrhunderts (German literature since the beginning of the 18th century, 3d ed. 1875). Of less importance are his philosophical works, which show tendencies toward the views of Jacobi: Die Anthropologie als Wissenschaft (The anthropology of science, 1822–23); Lehrbuch der Theoretischen Philosophie und Philosophischen Propädeutik (1826); Litterarästhetik (Literary Aesthetics, 1826); Universalphilosophische Prolegomena (1830); Der Organismus der Philosophischen Idee (1842); and Philosophie des Geistes (Philosophy of Intellect, 1835). Among his novels were Germanikus, a historical novel (2 vols., 1817); Eugenius Severus, a poetically decorated autobiographical tale covering up to his conversion to Protestantism and marriage (1818); Paradies und Welt, a philosophical novel describing a victory of the idealism of the heart over the commonplace prose of commonplace men (1822, 2nd ed., 1823).

== Family ==
He was the father of the German author Karl Hillebrand.
