= List of presidents of the First Chamber of the States of the Grand Duchy of Hesse =

The President of the First Chamber of the States of the Grand Duchy of Hesse was the presiding officer of the upper chamber of that legislature.

Name	Period
Friedrich zu Solms-Laubach	1820–1821
Albrecht zu Erbach-Fürstenau	1823–1824
Ernst Casimir zu Ysenburg-Büdingen	1826–1827
Otto zu Solms-Laubach	1829–1830
Emil von Hessen und bei Rhein	1832–1849
Friedrich Schenck	1849–1850
Otto zu Solms Laubach	1851–1856
Ludwig zu Hohensolms-Lich	1856–1866
Alfred zu Ernbach-Fürstenau	1866–1874
Karl von Schlitz	1875–1885
Alexander von Hessen und bei Rhein	1886–1888
Bruno zu Ysenburg-Büdingen	1889–1900
Emil von Schlitz	1900–1914
Karl zu Solms-Hohensolms-Lich	1914–1918

== Sources ==
- Ruppell, Hans Georg and Groß, Birgit: Hessische Abgeordnete 1820-1930, Düsseldorf 1980 ISBN 3-922316-14-X
