= Klaus Peter Möller =

German politician (1937–2022)

President of the Landtag of Hesse
- In office 5 April 1995 – 5 April 2003
- In office 28 July 1988 – 5 April 1991

Member of the Landtag of Hesse
- In office 24 May 1977 – 2003

Personal details
- Born: 8 August 1937 Darmstadt, Hesse, Germany
- Died: 20 January 2022 (aged 84)
- Party: CDU
- Education: German University of Administrative Sciences Speyer

Klaus Peter Möller (8 August 1937 – 20 January 2022) was a German politician. A member of the Christian Democratic Union of Germany, he served in the Landtag of Hesse from 1977 to 2003 and was its president from 1988 to 1991 and again from 1995 to 2003. He died on 20 January 2022, at the age of 84.
