= Holger Börner =

German politician (1931–2006)

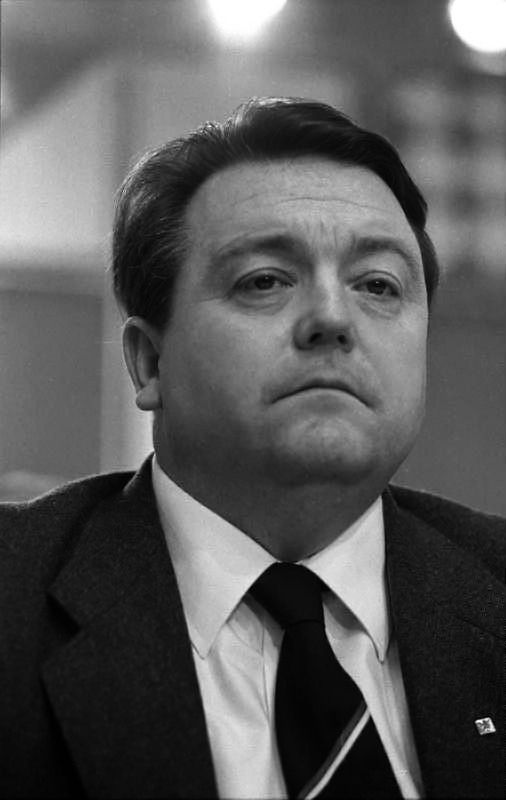
- Börner in 1978

Minister-President of Hesse
- In office 16 October 1976 – 23 April 1987
- Preceded by: Albert Osswald
- Succeeded by: Walter Wallmann

President of the Bundesrat
- In office 1 November 1986 – 23 April 1987
- Preceded by: Ernst Albrecht
- Succeeded by: Walter Wallmann

Member of the Landtag of Hesse
- In office 1 December 1978 – 5 April 1987
- Preceded by: Walter Schneider
- Succeeded by: Lisa Vollmer
- Constituency: Wahlkreis 05 (1978–1983); Kassel-Stadt II (1983–1987)

Member of the Bundestag; for Kassel
- In office 15 October 1957 – 22 October 1976
- Preceded by: Ludwig Preller
- Succeeded by: Karsten Voigt

Personal details
- Born: 7 February 1931 Kassel, Germany
- Died: 2 August 2006 (aged 75) Kassel, Germany
- Party: Social Democratic
- Children: 3
- Occupation: Construction worker, politician

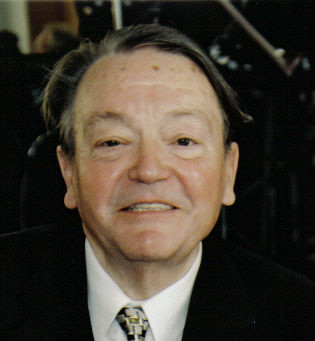
Börner in 2001

Holger Börner (7 February 1931 – 2 August 2006) was a German politician of the SPD.

He was the 4th Minister President of Hesse from 1976 until 1987. In this position, he served as the 38th President of the Bundesrat in 1986/87, but only served until the Landtag elections of 24 April 1987.

== Early life ==
Börner was born in Kassel, oldest of three children of Hermann (1906–1941) and Martha Börner (née Bengsohn) (1909–1997). His family had a social democratic history, reportedly his grandfather had moved from Berlin to Kassel due to Chancellor Otto von Bismarck's Anti-Socialist Laws. His father was a construction worker and a foreman at the construction company Gerdum & Breuer in Kassel and from 1931 to 1933, the chairman of the Wolfsanger SPD local association, before being sentenced to prison in a rigged trial and imprisoned in Emslandlager until 1935. He was later killed in Eastern Front near Smolensk on 14 October 1941 by Soviet partisans during bridge construction work. Börner's mother later served on the Kassel city council from 1946 to 1956 and again from 1962 to 1964.

After attending elementary and middle school, Börner became a construction worker after the Second World War, specializing in concrete. He became involved in the union early on and was most recently chairman of the works council of a Kassel construction company, for which he also worked as an auxiliary foreman.

== Political career ==
Son of a city councilwoman, Börner joined SPD in 1948, and was elected chairman of Kassel area Socialist Youth of Germany – Falcons. In 1950, he joined the executive committee of the city's party section.

In 1956, at the age of 25, Börner was elected to his hometown's city council, and resigned from his post as president of the Falcons.

In the 1957 federal election, he was the SPD candidate for Bundestag constituency nr. 127 - Kassel, which consisted of his hometown and the surrounding district of the same name. Despite CDU/CSU winning an absolute majority in the election, Börner won the election with 49.2 percent of the constituency vote and 48.9 percent of the party list vote. At the age of 26, he was the youngest member of Bundestag. He was elected to the seat again in 1961, 1965, 1969, 1972 and 1976, each time winning at least 51 percent of the vote. From 1962 to 1963, he was the head of SPD's youth wing JuSos.

His best result was in 1972, when he received 60.1 percent of constituency and 55.5 percent of party list vote. While in Bundestag, he was appointed as Parliamentary State Secretary to the Federal Minister of Transport Georg Leber in Kiesinger cabinet on 12 April 1967, he retained the post in the first Brandt cabinet until resigning on 4 February 1972, after being chosen by chancellor Willy Brandt to replace Hans-Jürgen Wischnewski as the party's federal executive director.

On 3 October 1976, Börner was re-elected to his Bundestag seat with 53.7 percent of constituency and 52.9 percent of party list vote. However, two weeks later, Minister President of Hesse Albert Osswald resigned on 16 October following a financial scandal involving public bank Helaba, and 45-year old Börner was chosen by SPD to succeed him as Minister President, so he resigned his Bundestag mandate and took over the state level social-liberal coalition, which was also in power at the federal level. In 1978, with the SPD and FDP winning a total of 57 out of 110 seats in Hesse Landtag, the coalition was returned, Börner was elected to the Landtag constituency nr. 5, which consisted of parts of Kassel. On 11 May 1981, his Deputy Minister President, Heinz-Herbert Karry (FDP) was assassinated by far-left Revolutionary Cells terror organization.

As Minister President, Börner was critical of the city of Lahn in central Hesse, calling it "rubble" (Scheißdreck). Lahn had been created under a 1976/77 state administrative reform by the merger of the cities of Giessen and Wetzlar, which his predecessor Osswald had been a supporter of. However, the city was unpopular with the public, and had led to CDU winning a majority at the local elections. Despite the city of Lahn being supported by his party, Börner adopted CDU's position in opposition to the city, "Wetzlar should become Wetzlar, and Giessen Giessen again." ("Wetzlar soll wieder Wetzlar, Gießen wieder Gießen werden") and had the merger overturned by 1979. In addition, under him the new Giessen region was created in central Hesse in 1981, carved out of the Darmstadt region.

In 1982, at federal level, the coalition between SPD and FDP at federal level collapsed. In the upcoming Hesse state elections on 26 September 1982, Börner campaigned against FDP's "betrayal in Bonn" and succeeded in FDP losing its representation in the Landtag entirely, falling under the 5-percent hurdle, while the Green Party entered the government, winning 9 seats. However, his SPD party won only 49 seats, 6 short of the 55-seat majority. Since the Green Party rejected a formal coalition, the only majority government possible was a CDU-SPD Grand coalition. However, since CDU had won 52 seats (3 more), Börner rejected it as it would have meant leaving the Minister President position to CDU, so his now all-SPD cabinet remained in office as a caretaker cabinet, being tolerated by the Greens until new elections were held on 25 September 1983. During the elections, he had rejected the idea of working with the Greens.

However, the election of 1983 resolved to only confirm the stalemate, with his SPD coming first at 51 seats, but still being 4 seats short of a majority, and FDP re-entering the Landtag. CDU and FDP wanted to form a black-yellow coalition implemented at federal level, but they only had 52 seats between them. So in 1984, Börner was re-elected to the Minister President as part of a minority government tolerated by the Greens. Finally, in October 1985, he managed to implement the first coalition between the SPD and the Greens in Germany, despite having promised earlier never to work with the Green Party. In this administration, Joschka Fischer was the first green party minister in Germany (minister of Environment and Energy). However, both the toleration phase and coalition period were determined by the Greens' internal conflicts between the "Fundis" (fundamentalists) and "Realos" (realists), and various conflicts between SPD and Greens. The coalition would ultimately prove to be short-lived, when in February 1987, it broke down due to disputes over operating license of Alkem fuel element factory in Hanau, so Börner dismissed Fischer from his post, and a new election was held on 5 April 1987, where Börner did not run again and was replaced by his Deputy Minister President Hans Krollmann as SPD candidate.

Börner supported nuclear energy, namely the building of Biblis Nuclear Power Plant in Southern Hesse. He was also critical of influx of Gastarbeiter from Turkey, saying it had to be stopped as they were not well-integrating.

During the Runway 18 West protests at Frankfurt Airport in 1980s, Börner said that during his construction worker days, the troublemakers would have been hit with roof battens. ("Wissen Sie, heute muss ich an öffentlichen Frieden denken. Vor 40 Jahren auf dem Bau hätte ich einen Angriff auf meine Person mit der Dachlatte beantwortet.")

Afterwards, until 2003, he was chairman of the Friedrich Ebert Stiftung.

Börner died of cancer at the age of 75 on 2 August 2006 and was survived by his wife Carola (married since 27 December 1950) and three children, sons Olaf and Fritjof and daughter Heike. He professed to have always carried a gun and took regular target practice.

Political offices
Preceded by Albert Osswald (SPD)	Minister-President of Hesse; 1976 – 1987	Succeeded by Walter Wallmann (CDU)
