= Ekkehard Gries =

German politician

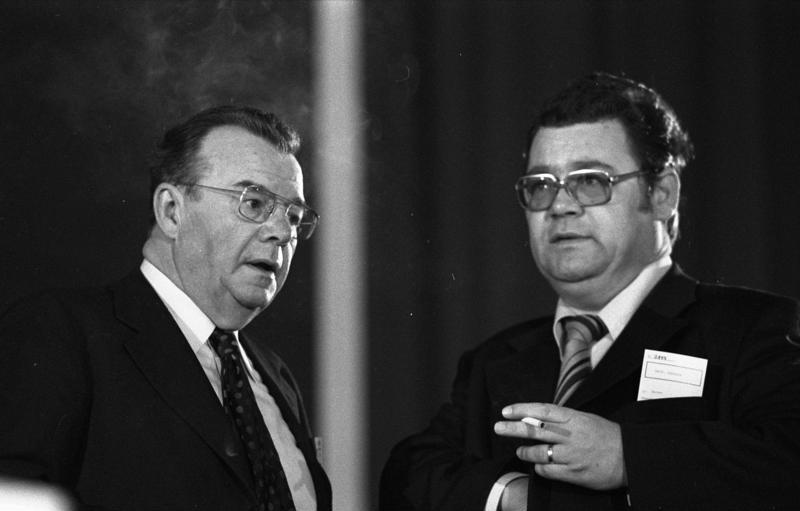
- Heinz-Herbert Karry and Ekkehard Gries 1976 in Frankfurt am Main

Member of the Bundestag
- In office 18 February 1987 – 10 November 1994

Personal details
- Born: 16 September 1936 Eichenberg
- Died: 30 July 2001 (aged 64)
- Party: FDP

Ekkehard Gries (16 September 1936 – 30 July 2001) was a German politician of the Free Democratic Party (FDP) and former member of the German Bundestag.

== Life ==
From 1987 to 1994, Gries was a member of the German Bundestag and transport policy spokesman for the FDP parliamentary group. He had entered parliament in both legislative periods via the state list of the FDP Hessen.

== Literature ==
Herbst, Ludolf; Jahn, Bruno (2002). Vierhaus, Rudolf (ed.). Biographisches Handbuch der Mitglieder des Deutschen Bundestages. 1949–2002 [Biographical Handbook of the Members of the German Bundestag. 1949–2002] (in German). München: De Gruyter - De Gruyter Saur. p. 1715. ISBN 978-3-11-184511-1.
