= Landtag of Hesse =

State legislature in Germany

Coordinates: 50.082°N 8.241°E

Landtag of Hesse Hessischer Landtag
- 21st Landtag of Hesse

Type
- Type: Landtag
- Established: 19 September 1946

Leadership
- President of the Landtag: Astrid Wallmann, CDU since 2022

Structure
- Seats: 133
- Political groups: Government (75) CDU (52) SPD (23) Opposition (58) AfD (25) Greens (22) FDP (8) Independent (3)

Elections
- Last election: 8 October 2023
- Next election: 2028

Meeting place
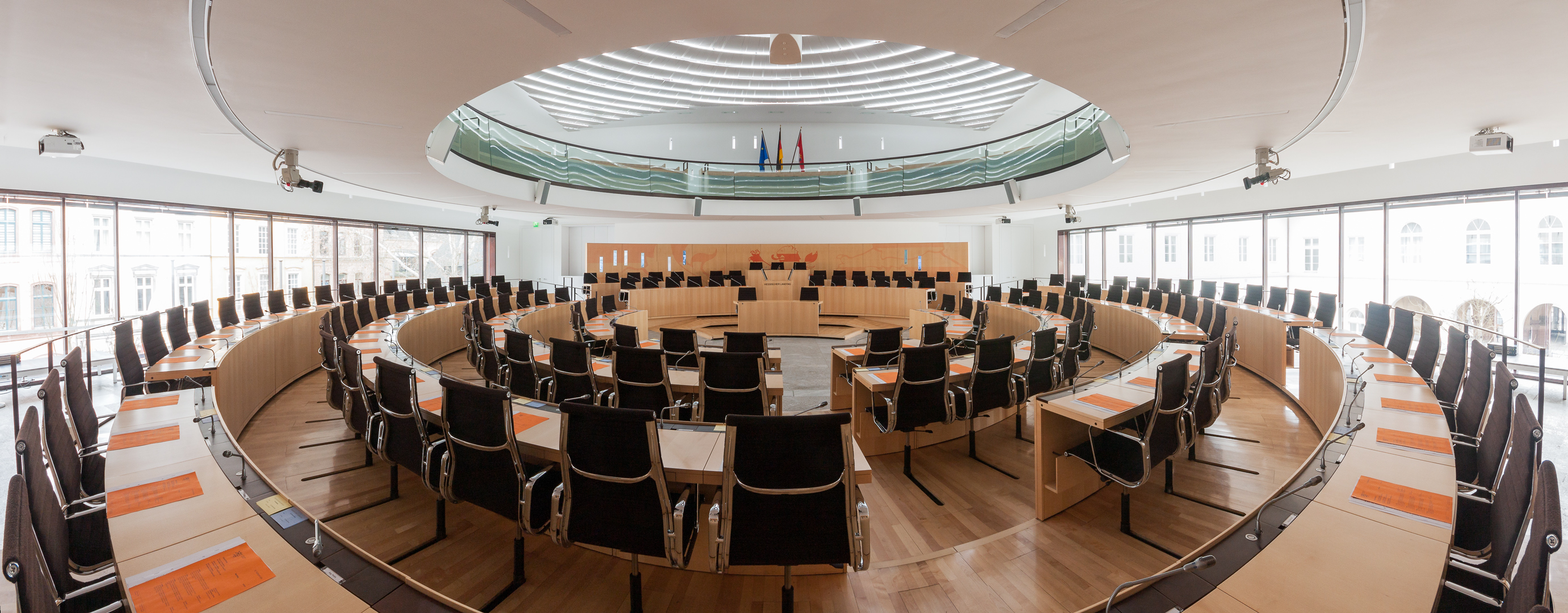
- Stadtschloss, Wiesbaden

Website
- www.hessischer-landtag.de

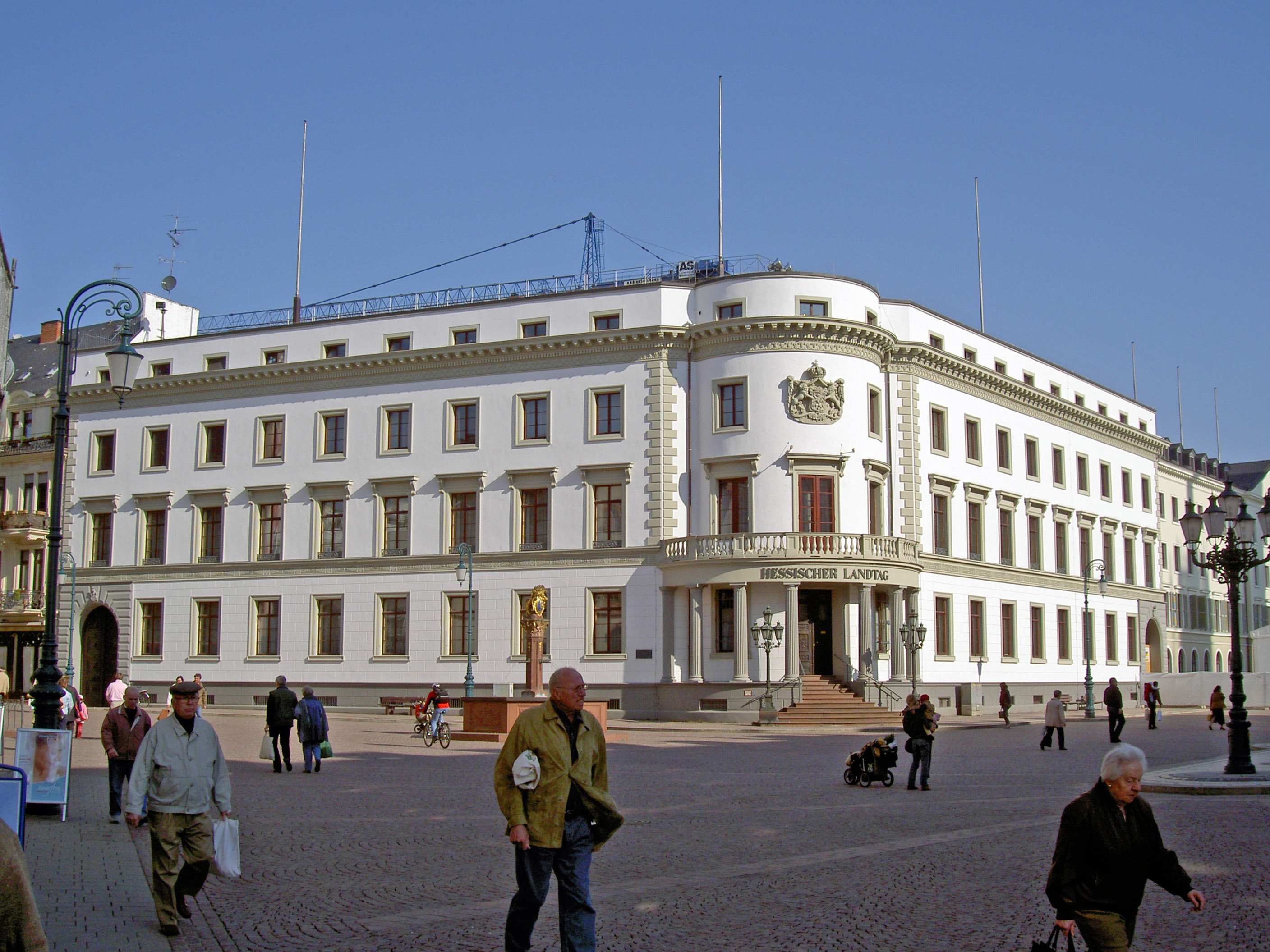
Landtag of Hesse

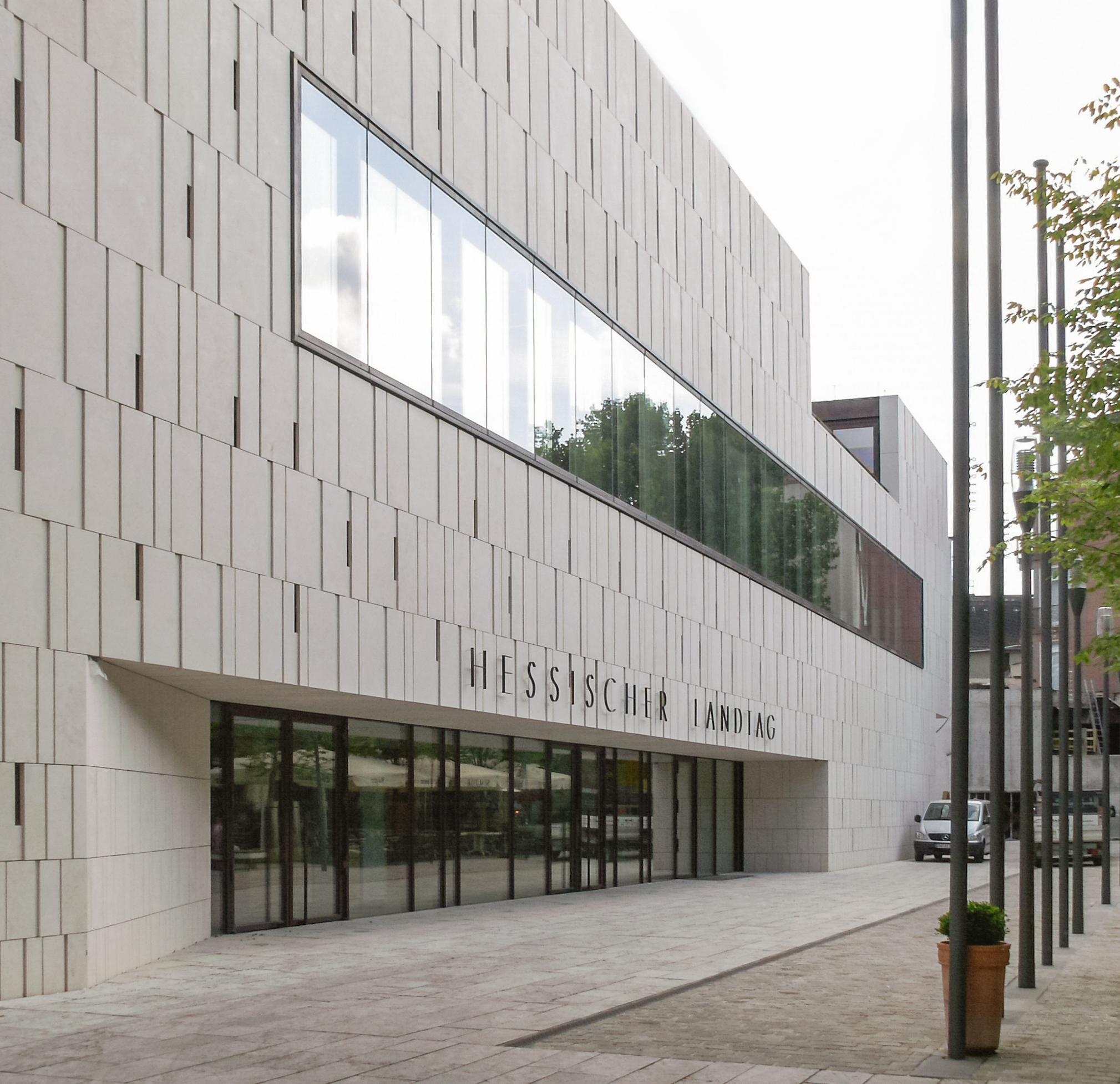
Landtag of Hesse, extension

The Landtag of Hesse (German: Hessischer Landtag) is the unicameral parliament of the State of Hesse in the Federal Republic of Germany. It convenes in the Stadtschloss in Wiesbaden. As a legislature it is responsible for passing laws at the state level and enacting the budget. Its most important function is to elect and control the state government. The constitution of the State of Hesse describes the role of the Landtag in sections 75 to 99.

The Landtag currently consists of 133 members of five parties. There is a coalition between the Christian Democratic Union and the SPD. The President of the Landtag is Astrid Wallmann and the Minister-President of Hesse is Boris Rhein.

The members are elected via a mixed-member proportional representation system, with a minimum of 5% vote share to receive any seats. The smallest allowed size of Landtag is 110 members (without overhang and levelling seats), of which 55 are elected first-past-the-post in single-member constituencies and others are elected by party list vote.

In Hesse, voting in Landtag elections is available for every German citizen aged 18 or over, who has primarily resided in the state for at least three months. To stand for election, a candidate is also required to have resided in the state for at least a year.

== Beratender Landesausschuss ==
After World War II, the state of Hesse was restored by the US military administration under the name of Greater Hesse. In 1945, the US military administration implemented the "Beratender Landesausschuss" (Advisory State Committee of Greater Hesse). The members of this pre-parliament were appointed and not elected.

| Party | Seats |
|---|---|
| CDU | 12 |
| SPD | 12 |
| LDP | 12 |
| KPD | 12 |
| total | 48 |

== Elections ==
=== Constitutional convention ===
On 30 June 1946 a Constitutional convention of Hesse ("Verfassungsgebenden Landesversammlung") was elected.

This election was won by the SPD, even if the SPD failed to capture a majority of seats. On 22 November 1945 the constitution for Greater Hesse (Staatsgrundgesetz des Staates Groß-Hessen) was introduced.

| Party | Seats |
|---|---|
| SPD | 41 |
| CDU | 36 |
| KPD | 7 |
| LDP | 6 |
| total | 90 |

=== 1st legislative period (1946 through 1950) ===
The first regular election on 1 December 1946 was also won by the SPD.

A grand coalition of SPD and CDU elected Christian Stock (SPD) the first freely elected Minister-President of Hesse after World War II.

| Party | Seats |
|---|---|
| SPD | 38 |
| CDU | 28 |
| LDP | 14 |
| KPD | 10 |
| total | 90 |

=== 2nd legislative period (1950 through 1954) ===
The second election on 19 November 1950 inaugurated the 37-year period of the so-called "red Hesse". The SPD achieved majority and the CDU, the former partner in the grand coalition, lost close to 60% of their seats. Until 1987, all governments of Hesse were headed by SPD politicians.

On 14 December 1950 the former Minister of Justice, Georg August Zinn (SPD), was elected as Minister-President of Hesse. Zinn was re-elected 4 times and was Minister-President until 3 October 1969.

| Party | Seats 1950 | Seats 1954 |
|---|---|---|
| SPD | 47 | 48 |
| FDP | 13 | 13 |
| CDU | 12 | 12 |
| GB/BHE | 8 | 7 |
| total | 80 | 80 |

=== 3rd legislative period (1954 through 1958) ===
The SPD lost its absolute majority in the third election on 28 November 1953, but governed in a coalition with the "All-German Bloc/League of Expellees and Deprived of Rights", a party representing the victims of the post-war expulsion of Germans.

| Party | Seats 1954 | Seats 1958 |
|---|---|---|
| SPD | 44 | 44 |
| CDU | 24 | 24 |
| FDP | 21 | 20 |
| GB/BHE | 7 | 7 |
| Non-Inscrits | 0 | 1 |
| total | 96 | 96 |

=== 4th legislative period (1958 through 1962) ===
The fourth election of 23 November 1958 resulted in the continuation of the previous coalition.

| Party | Seats |
|---|---|
| SPD | 48 |
| CDU | 32 |
| FDP | 9 |
| GB/BHE | 7 |
| total | 96 |

=== 5th legislative period (1962 through 1966) ===
Although the SPD won an absolute majority on 11 November 1962, Zinn decided to continue the SPD's coalition with the GDP (Gesamtdeutsche Partei, the new name of GB/BHE).

| Party | Seats 1962 | Seats 1966 |
|---|---|---|
| SPD | 51 | 51 |
| CDU | 26 | 26 |
| FDP | 11 | 12 |
| GDP | 6 | 5 |
| total | 94 | 94 |

=== 6th legislative period (1966 through 1970) ===
On 6 November 1966, the SPD elected a majority of MPs once more. Zinn was appointed one last time as Minister-President. On 3 October 1969, 68-year-old Zinn resigned and Albert Osswald (SPD) was elected as his successor.

| Party | Begin | End |
|---|---|---|
| SPD | 52 | 52 |
| CDU | 26 | 26 |
| FDP | 10 | 10 |
| NPD | 8 | 7 |
| Non-Inscrits | 0 | 1 |
| total | 96 | 96 |

=== 7th legislative period (1970 through 1974) ===
Headed by Alfred Dregger, the CDU was able to make an impressive jump in the election of 8 November 1970. The SPD lost its majority but agreed on a social–liberal coalition with the FDP, and Albert Osswald was reelected.

| Party | Seats |
|---|---|
| SPD | 53 |
| CDU | 46 |
| FDP | 11 |
| total | 110 |

=== 8th legislative period (1974 through 1978) ===
Alfred Dregger and his CDU were even more successful in the election on 27 October 1974. For the first time in the history of Hesse, the CDU overtook the SPD. Nevertheless, the social–liberal coalition remained in government, and Osswald remained Minister-President.

Two years later Osswald resigned because of the Helaba-scandal. Holger Börner (SPD) was elected as his replacement.

| Party | Seats 1974 | Seats 1978 |
|---|---|---|
| CDU | 53 | 53 |
| SPD | 49 | 49 |
| FDP | 8 | 7 |
| Non-Inscrits | 0 | 1 |
| total | 110 | |

=== 9th legislative period (1978 through 1982) ===
Expecting a majority, the results were disappointing for the CDU. In the period of RAF terrorism, the CDU stagnated and the SPD–FDP coalition was confirmed in the elections on 8 October 1978. On 11 May 1981, deputy Minister-President Heinz-Herbert Karry was assassinated by terrorists in his flat in Frankfurt am Main. This legislative period is also marked by the demonstrations against the extension of the Frankfurt Airport. Himself hard-pressed by activists in his car, Börner, previously a learned roofer, at the time said that 40 years ago, he would have answered such attacks directed at his person — meaning the anti-airport-activists (the later Greens) — with "roof battens". Börner thus entered Hesse history as the "man with a roof batten".

| Party | Seats |
|---|---|
| CDU | 53 |
| SPD | 50 |
| FDP | 7 |
| total | 110 |

=== 10th legislative period (1982 through 1983) ===
After the end of the social–liberal coalition in federal government, the FDP was not able to reach more than 5% in the Hessian Landtag, and so won no seats. At the same time, reaching the 5% threshold, the Greens (Die Grünen) made their entrance in a German parliament for the first time, but not long thereafter, they announced their fundamental opposition to form a coalition with one of the other political groups. For its part, the SPD was not willing to accept a grand coalition headed by the CDU. As a result, a snap election took place a year later.

| Party | Seats |
|---|---|
| CDU | 52 |
| SPD | 49 |
| Greens | 9 |
| total | 110 |

=== 11th legislative period (1983 through 1987) ===
The snap election on 25 August 1983 saw the return of the FDP to the Landtag, but neither the CDU nor the SPD won a majority.

| Party | Seats |
|---|---|
| SPD | 51 |
| CDU | 44 |
| FDP | 8 |
| Die Grünen | 7 |
| total | 110 |

Holger Börner was reelected as Minister-President, and in 1985 the first red–green alliance in Germany was formed. Joschka Fischer was nominated minister for environment and energy. The Green party at this time was divided in "fundamental" and "democratic" factions. These two groups were not able to agree on a common platform. The "red–green chaos" was the common description for these years. The coalition ended in February 1987.

=== 12th legislative period (1987 through 1991) ===
The 1987 election was a milestone. As a rule, the party ruling Germany lost votes in the state elections. CDU and FDP had lost all elections on state level since Helmut Kohl had been elected as chancellor. But the red-green-chaos lead to surprising results: on 5 April 1987, the CDU and the FDP won the elections and Walter Wallmann became the first CDU Minister-President of Hesse.

| Party | Seats |
|---|---|
| CDU | 47 |
| SPD | 44 |
| Die Grünen | 10 |
| FDP | 9 |
| total | 110 |

=== 13th legislative period (1991 through 1995) ===
The vote on 20 January 1991 was as close as the last one, but this time the SPD and the Greens obtained slightly more seats. Hand Eichel (SPD) became the new Minister-President, supported by a red–green alliance.

| Party | Seats |
|---|---|
| SPD | 46 |
| CDU | 46 |
| Die Grünen | 10 |
| FDP | 8 |
| total | 110 |

=== 14th legislative period (1995 through 1999) ===
After the elections on 19 February 1995, the red–green alliance continued.

| Party | Seats 1995 | Seats 1999 |
|---|---|---|
| CDU | 45 | 45 |
| SPD | 44 | 44 |
| Die Grünen | 13 | 13 |
| FDP | 8 | 7 |
| Non-Inscrits | 0 | 1 |
| total | 110 | 110 |

=== 15th legislative period (1999 through 2003) ===
On 7 February 1999, the CDU won the elections with a 4.2% margin. One of the main reasons given for this result is an unpopular red–green legislative project aimed at granting citizenship to aliens. This would have granted suffrage to millions of aliens (mainly Turks). According to surveys, 80% of these aliens would have voted for left-leaning parties. In order to put a stop to this project, the CDU organized a campaign and collected more than 5 million signatures.

Roland Koch (CDU) was appointed Minister-President of a CDU–FDP coalition.

| Party | Seats |
|---|---|
| CDU | 50 |
| SPD | 46 |
| Bündnis 90/Die Grünen | 8 |
| FDP | 6 |
| total | 110 |

=== 16th legislative period (2003 through 2008) ===
The election of 2 February 2003 was a disaster for the SPD. The CDU managed to get a majority even without the FDP. All but two constituencies were won, even in the north of Hesse, where the SPD had won every election in the 20th century.

| Party | Seats |
|---|---|
| CDU | 56 |
| SPD | 33 |
| Bündnis 90/Die Grünen | 12 |
| FDP | 9 |
| total | 110 |

=== 17th legislative period (2008 through 2009) ===
Like in 1982, the results of the election allowed no stable coalition to take the reins of government. Andrea Ypsilanti, leader of the SPD, had promised several times during the electoral campaign not to work together with the new leftist party Die Linke (The Left). A few weeks after election day, she was tempted to go for a SPD–Green coalition supported by The Left but under opposition from MP Dagmar Metzger (SPD) decided not to renege on her promise not to pursue such a venue. Roland Koch remained Minister-President, but without a majority in the parliament. After a second unsuccessful attempt by Ypsilanti to take power, all parties agreed to dissolve the Landtag and call for early elections on 18 January 2009.

| Party | Seats |
|---|---|
| CDU | 42 |
| SPD | 42 |
| FDP | 11 |
| Bündnis 90/Die Grünen | 9 |
| Die Linke | 6 |
| total | 110 |

=== 18th legislative period (2009 through 2013) ===
Andrea Ypsilanti resigned as the SPD's top candidate and Minister-President nominee. She was replaced by Thorsten Schäfer-Gümbel, an unknown backbencher and loyal supporter of Ypsilanti. The SPD announced that they were willing to form a governing coalition with Die Linke.

The early election on 18 January 2009 led to a stable majority of CDU and FDP. The SPD lost a third of their seats.

| Party | Seats |
|---|---|
| CDU | 46 |
| SPD | 29 |
| FDP | 20 |
| Bündnis 90/Die Grünen | 17 |
| Die Linke | 6 |
| total | 118 |

Seating of the 18th Landtag of Hesse (2009–2013)

=== 19th legislative period (2013 through 2018) ===
The elections of 22 September 2013 did not lead to a stable majority for any of the common coalitions. After several weeks of coalition talks, Volker Bouffier's CDU and Tarek Al-Wazir's Green Party formed the first black–green coalition in any German state.

| Party | Seats |
|---|---|
| CDU | 47 |
| SPD | 37 |
| Bündnis 90/Die Grünen | 14 |
| Die Linke | 6 |
| FDP | 6 |
| total | 110 |

=== 20th legislative period (2018 through 2023) ===
The black–green (CDU–Green) coalition government continued, but with only a one seat majority (69 of 137 seats). The far-right AfD won seats in the Landtag for the first time in history. With 19.8% of the vote, 66 votes behind the Greens, the SPD had their worst result ever in the state.

| Party | Percentage of Votes | Seats |
|---|---|---|
| CDU | 27.0% | 40 |
| Bündnis 90/Die Grünen | 19.8% | 29 |
| SPD | 19.8% | 29 |
| AfD | 13.1% | 19 |
| FDP | 7.5% | 11 |
| Die Linke | 6.3% | 9 |
| total | | 137 |

=== 21st legislative period (2023 through present) ===
| Party | Percentage of Votes | Seats |
|---|---|---|
| CDU | 34.6% | 52 |
| AfD | 18.4% | 28 |
| SPD | 15.1% | 23 |
| Bündnis 90/Die Grünen | 14.8% | 22 |
| FDP | 5.0% | 8 |
| total | | 133 |

Seating of the 21st Landtag of Hesse (2023–)

=== Next Hessian state election ===
The next election is set to take place no later than 2028.

== See also ==
- List of presidents of the Landtag of Hesse
