= Neckar-Zaber (electoral district) =

Federal electoral district of Germany

266 Neckar-Zaber
- Electoral district for the Bundestag
- Neckar-Zaber in 2025
- State: Baden-Württemberg
- Population: 331,600 (2019)
- Electorate: 230,738 (2021)
- Major settlements: Bietigheim-Bissingen; Remseck; Sachsenheim
- Area: 642.4 km^{2}

Current electoral district
- Created: 1980
- Party: CDU
- Member: Fabian Gramling
- Elected: 2021, 2025

Neckar-Zaber is an electoral constituency (German: Wahlkreis) represented in the Bundestag. It elects one member via first-past-the-post voting. Under the current constituency numbering system, it is designated as constituency 266. It is located in northern Baden-Württemberg, comprising the southern part of the Landkreis Heilbronn district and the northern part of the Ludwigsburg district.

Neckar-Zaber was created for the 1980 federal election. Since 2021, it has been represented by Fabian Gramling of the Christian Democratic Union (CDU).

== Geography ==
Neckar-Zaber is located in northern Baden-Württemberg. As of the 2021 federal election, it comprises the municipalities of Abstatt, Beilstein, Brackenheim, Cleebronn, Flein, Güglingen, Ilsfeld, Lauffen am Neckar, Leingarten, Neckarwestheim, Nordheim, Pfaffenhofen, Talheim, Untergruppenbach, and Zaberfeld from the Landkreis Heilbronn district, as well as the municipalities of Affalterbach, Benningen am Neckar, Besigheim, Bietigheim-Bissingen, Bönnigheim, Erdmannhausen, Erligheim, Freiberg am Neckar, Freudental, Gemmrigheim, Großbottwar, Hessigheim, Ingersheim, Kirchheim am Neckar, Löchgau, Marbach am Neckar, Mundelsheim, Murr, Oberstenfeld, Pleidelsheim, Sachsenheim, Steinheim an der Murr, Tamm, and Walheim from the Ludwigsburg district.

== History ==
Neckar-Zaber was created in 1980 and contained parts of the redistributed constituencies of Ludwigsburg and Heilbronn. In the 1980 through 1998 elections, it was constituency 170 in the numbering system. In the 2002 and 2005 elections, it was number 267. Since the 2009 election, it has been number 266.

Originally, the constituency had a configuration similar to its current borders, but lacking the municipalities of Flein, Talheim, and Leingarten from the Landkreis Heilbronn district. In the 1998 election, it acquired the Flein and Talheim municipalities. In the 2005 election, it acquired the Leingarten municipality.

Election	No.	Name	Borders
1980	170	Neckar-Zaber	Ludwigsburg district (only Affalterbach, Benningen am Neckar, Besigheim, Bietigheim-Bissingen, Bönnigheim, Erdmannhausen, Erligheim, Freiberg am Neckar, Freudental, Gemmrigheim, Großbottwar, Hessigheim, Ingersheim, Kirchheim am Neckar, Löchgau, Marbach am Neckar, Mundelsheim, Murr, Oberstenfeld, Pleidelsheim, Sachsenheim, Steinheim an der Murr, Tamm, and Walheim municipalities); Landkreis Heilbronn district (only Abstatt, Beilstein, Brackenheim, Cleebronn, Güglingen, Ilsfeld, Lauffen am Neckar, Neckarwestheim, Nordheim, Pfaffenhofen, Untergruppenbach, and Zaberfeld municipalities)
1983	170	Neckar-Zaber	
1987	170	Neckar-Zaber	
1990	170	Neckar-Zaber	
1994	170	Neckar-Zaber	
1998	170	Neckar-Zaber	Ludwigsburg district (only Affalterbach, Benningen am Neckar, Besigheim, Bietigheim-Bissingen, Bönnigheim, Erdmannhausen, Erligheim, Freiberg am Neckar, Freudental, Gemmrigheim, Großbottwar, Hessigheim, Ingersheim, Kirchheim am Neckar, Löchgau, Marbach am Neckar, Mundelsheim, Murr, Oberstenfeld, Pleidelsheim, Sachsenheim, Steinheim an der Murr, Tamm, and Walheim municipalities); Landkreis Heilbronn district (only Abstatt, Beilstein, Brackenheim, Cleebronn, Flein, Güglingen, Ilsfeld, Lauffen am Neckar, Neckarwestheim, Nordheim, Pfaffenhofen, Talheim, Untergruppenbach, and Zaberfeld municipalities)
2002	267	Neckar-Zaber	
2005	267	Neckar-Zaber	Ludwigsburg district (only Affalterbach, Benningen am Neckar, Besigheim, Bietigheim-Bissingen, Bönnigheim, Erdmannhausen, Erligheim, Freiberg am Neckar, Freudental, Gemmrigheim, Großbottwar, Hessigheim, Ingersheim, Kirchheim am Neckar, Löchgau, Marbach am Neckar, Mundelsheim, Murr, Oberstenfeld, Pleidelsheim, Sachsenheim, Steinheim an der Murr, Tamm, and Walheim municipalities); Landkreis Heilbronn district (only Abstatt, Beilstein, Brackenheim, Cleebronn, Flein, Güglingen, Ilsfeld, Lauffen am Neckar, Leingarten, Neckarwestheim, Nordheim, Pfaffenhofen, Talheim, Untergruppenbach, and Zaberfeld municipalities)
2009	266	Neckar-Zaber	
2013	266	Neckar-Zaber	
2017	266	Neckar-Zaber	
2021	266	Neckar-Zaber	
2025	266	Neckar-Zaber	

== Members ==
The constituency was first represented by Renate Hellwig of the Christian Democratic Union (CDU) from 1980 to 1998. Hans Martin Bury of the Social Democratic Party (SPD) was elected in 1998 and served one term. Eberhard Gienger of the CDU was representative from 2002 to 2021. He was succeeded by Fabian Gramling in 2021.

Election	Member	Party	%
1980	Renate Hellwig	CDU	46.0
1983	Renate Hellwig	CDU	53.6
1987	Renate Hellwig	CDU	48.3
1990	Renate Hellwig	CDU	44.5
1994	Renate Hellwig	CDU	43.6
1998	Hans Martin Bury	SPD	42.5
2002	Eberhard Gienger	CDU	44.5
2005	Eberhard Gienger	CDU	46.4
2009	Eberhard Gienger	CDU	42.0
2013	Eberhard Gienger	CDU	53.2
2017	Eberhard Gienger	CDU	40.0
2021	Fabian Gramling	CDU	30.4
2025	Fabian Gramling	CDU	39.3

== Election results ==
=== 2025 election ===
Federal election (2025): Neckar-Zaber
Notes:	Blue background denotes the winner of the electorate vote. Pink background denotes a candidate elected from their party list. Yellow background denotes an electorate win by a list member, or other incumbent. A ✓ or ✗ denotes status of any incumbent, win or lose respectively.						
Party	Candidate	Votes	%	±%	Party votes	%	±%
CDU	Fabian Gramling	76,390	39.3	▲8.9	64,629	33.1	▲8.2
SPD	Mario Sickinger	29,182	15.0	▼7.5	28,171	14.4	▼7.9
Greens	Lars Swiss	22,573	11.6	▼4.1	23,637	12.1	▼3.5
FDP	Andrey Belkin	7,695	4.0	▼8.4	12,296	6.3	▼10.3
AfD	Dieter Glatting	37,965	19.5	▲9.5	39,633	20.3	▲10.2
Left	Julia Schlembach	9,924	5.1	▲2.7	10,386	5.3	▲2.7
FW	Harald Kubitzki	5,081	2.6	▲0.3	2,854	1.5	▼0.3
dieBasis	Sven Kerzel	2,043	1.0	▼0.9	1,003	0.5	▼1.1
Tierschutzpartei					1,636	0.8	▼0.3
PARTEI				▼1.4	806	0.4	▼0.5
Team Todenhöfer							▼0.4
Pirates							▼0.3
ÖDP	Sascha Happy	992	0.5	▼0.1	459	0.2	▼0.1
Volt	Cornelia Hoffman	2,775	1.4		1,471	0.8	▲0.5
Bündnis C					329	0.2	▼0.0
Bürgerbewegung							▼0.5
BD					193	0.1	
Gesundheitsforschung							▼0.1
BSW					7,428	3.8	
Humanists							▼0.1
MLPD					82	0.0	▼0.0
Informal votes		1,272			879		
Total valid votes		194,620			195,013		
Turnout		195,892	85.7	▲4.8			
CDU hold	Majority			▲8.9			

=== 2021 election ===
Federal election (2021): Neckar-Zaber
Notes:	Blue background denotes the winner of the electorate vote. Pink background denotes a candidate elected from their party list. Yellow background denotes an electorate win by a list member, or other incumbent. A ✓ or ✗ denotes status of any incumbent, win or lose respectively.						
Party	Candidate	Votes	%	±%	Party votes	%	±%
CDU	Fabian Gramling	56,249	30.4	▼9.6	46,315	25.0	▼8.0
SPD	Thomas Utz	41,708	22.5	▲2.8	41,369	22.3	▲5.8
Greens	Lars Schweizer	29,015	15.7	▲3.2	29,048	15.7	▲2.5
FDP	Marcel Distl	22,792	12.3	▲3.5	30,783	16.6	▲1.9
AfD	Marc Jongen	18,478	10.0	▼2.6	18,702	10.1	▼3.0
Left	Emma Weber	4,357	2.4	▼2.2	4,851	2.6	▼2.6
FW	Jan Rittaler	4,218	2.3	▲0.6	3,248	1.8	▲0.8
dieBasis	Sven Kerzel	3,655	2.0		3,078	1.7	
Tierschutzpartei					2,054	1.1	▲0.3
PARTEI	Alexander Wezel	2,601	1.4		1,719	0.9	▲0.3
Team Todenhöfer					809	0.4	
Pirates					619	0.3	▼0.1
ÖDP	Gerd Bogisch	1,058	0.6		592	0.3	0.0
Volt					561	0.3	
Bündnis C					384	0.2	
Bürgerbewegung					283	0.2	
DiB	Wolfgang Schaible	610	0.3		250	0.1	0.0
Independent	Werner Hartmann	310	0.2				
Gesundheitsforschung					223	0.1	
NPD					220	0.1	▼0.2
Humanists					174	0.1	
Bündnis 21					57	0.0	
LKR					46	0.0	
MLPD					30	0.0	▼0.1
DKP					21	0.0	0.0
Informal votes		1,622			1,237		
Total valid votes		185,051			185,436		
Turnout		186,673	80.9	▼0.4			
CDU hold	Majority	14,541	7.9	▼12.4			

=== 2017 election ===
Federal election (2017): Neckar-Zaber
Notes:	Blue background denotes the winner of the electorate vote. Pink background denotes a candidate elected from their party list. Yellow background denotes an electorate win by a list member, or other incumbent. A ✓ or ✗ denotes status of any incumbent, win or lose respectively.						
Party	Candidate	Votes	%	±%	Party votes	%	±%
CDU	✓ Eberhard Gienger	73,689	40.0	▼13.2	60,898	32.9	▼12.3
SPD	Thomas Utz	36,327	19.7	▼6.7	30,472	16.5	▼4.5
AfD	Marc Jongen	23,215	12.6		24,212	13.1	▲7.6
Greens	Catherine Kern	23,092	12.5	▲3.1	24,282	13.1	▲2.6
FDP	Marcel Distl	16,191	8.8	▲5.7	27,145	14.7	▲8.0
Left	Walter Kubach	8,453	4.6	▲0.2	9,719	5.3	▲1.1
FW	Harald Kubitzki	3,128	1.7		1,818	1.0	▲0.4
Tierschutzpartei					1,444	0.8	0.0
PARTEI					1,197	0.6	
Pirates					771	0.4	▼1.8
NPD					574	0.3	▼0.8
ÖDP					555	0.3	▼0.1
Tierschutzallianz					425	0.2	
DM					260	0.1	
BGE					222	0.1	
DiB					219	0.1	
Menschliche Welt					212	0.1	
V-Partei³					209	0.1	
MLPD	Siegmar Herrlinger	287	0.2		125	0.1	0.0
DIE RECHTE					66	0.0	
DKP					12	0.0	
Informal votes		1,980			1,525		
Total valid votes		184,382			184,837		
Turnout		186,362	81.3	▲3.2			
CDU hold	Majority	37,362	20.3	▼6.5			

=== 2013 election ===
Federal election (2013): Neckar-Zaber
Notes:	Blue background denotes the winner of the electorate vote. Pink background denotes a candidate elected from their party list. Yellow background denotes an electorate win by a list member, or other incumbent. A ✓ or ✗ denotes status of any incumbent, win or lose respectively.						
Party	Candidate	Votes	%	±%	Party votes	%	±%
CDU	✓ Eberhard Gienger	92,693	53.2	▲11.1	79,372	45.3	▲12.3
SPD	Thorsten Majer	45,962	26.4	▲2.9	36,849	21.0	▲1.0
Greens	Andreas Roll	16,474	9.5	▼1.6	18,551	10.6	▼2.9
Left	Walter Kubach	7,697	4.4	▼1.0	7,271	4.1	▼2.3
FDP	Christian Meyer	5,404	3.1	▼11.6	11,799	6.7	▼13.8
AfD					9,703	5.5	
Pirates					3,810	2.2	▲0.4
NPD	Daniel Reiß	3,442	2.0	▲0.3	1,921	1.1	▼0.1
Tierschutzpartei					1,350	0.8	▲0.1
FW					1,051	0.6	
REP					738	0.4	▼0.7
ÖDP	Walter Frölich	2,608	1.5	▲0.8	705	0.4	▼0.1
RENTNER					645	0.4	
PBC					474	0.3	▼0.3
Volksabstimmung					299	0.2	0.0
PRO					190	0.1	
BIG					186	0.1	
Party of Reason					179	0.1	
MLPD					86	0.0	0.0
BüSo					79	0.0	0.0
Informal votes		2,854			1,876		
Total valid votes		174,280			175,258		
Turnout		177,134	78.1	▲2.0			
CDU hold	Majority	47,001	26.8	▲8.3			

=== 2009 election ===
Federal election (2009): Neckar-Zaber
Notes:	Blue background denotes the winner of the electorate vote. Pink background denotes a candidate elected from their party list. Yellow background denotes an electorate win by a list member, or other incumbent. A ✓ or ✗ denotes status of any incumbent, win or lose respectively.						
Party	Candidate	Votes	%	±%	Party votes	%	±%
CDU	✓ Eberhard Gienger	70,606	42.0	▼4.4	55,618	33.0	▼4.9
SPD	Thorsten Majer	39,430	23.5	▼10.7	33,711	20.0	▼11.9
FDP	Harald Leibrecht	24,682	14.7	▲7.6	34,641	20.6	▲7.7
Greens	Andreas Roll	18,626	11.1	▲4.5	22,773	13.5	▲4.1
Left	Walter Kubach	9,169	5.5	▲2.8	10,852	6.4	▲3.2
Pirates					3,041	1.8	
REP					1,954	1.2	▼0.2
NPD	Martin Krämer	2,798	1.7	▼0.2	1,941	1.2	▼0.1
Tierschutzpartei					1,161	0.7	
PBC					905	0.5	0.0
ÖDP	Armin Demele	1,177	0.7		785	0.5	
Independent	Roland Mackert	1,095	0.7				
DIE VIOLETTEN					353	0.2	
Independent	Manfred Egon Winkler	346	0.2				
Volksabstimmung					318	0.2	
DVU					108	0.1	
BüSo					85	0.1	0.0
ADM					68	0.0	
MLPD					60	0.0	0.0
Informal votes		2,745			2,300		
Total valid votes		167,929			168,374		
Turnout		170,674	76.2	▼5.8			
CDU hold	Majority	31,176	18.5	▲6.3			

=== 2005 election ===
Federal election (2005): Neckar-Zaber
Notes:	Blue background denotes the winner of the electorate vote. Pink background denotes a candidate elected from their party list. Yellow background denotes an electorate win by a list member, or other incumbent. A ✓ or ✗ denotes status of any incumbent, win or lose respectively.						
Party	Candidate	Votes	%	±%	Party votes	%	±%
CDU	✓ Eberhard Gienger	81,743	46.4	▲1.9	66,936	38.0	▼2.9
SPD	Thorsten Majer	60,239	34.2	▼8.5	56,306	31.9	▼2.8
FDP	Harald Leibrecht	12,581	7.1	▲1.2	22,695	12.9	▲4.3
Greens	Sebastian Engelmann	11,593	6.6	▲2.0	16,561	9.4	▼1.7
Left	Johannes Müllerschön	4,593	2.7	▲1.8	5,759	3.3	▲2.5
NPD	Siegfried Gärttner	3,259	1.9		2,188	1.2	▲1.0
REP					2,345	1.3	▼0.3
GRAUEN	Jutta Borcherding	1,909	1.1	▲0.4	1,246	0.7	▲0.4
Familie					1,093	0.6	
PBC					992	0.6	0.0
MLPD					138	0.1	
BüSo					111	0.1	
Informal votes		3,054			2,701		
Total valid votes		176,017			176,370		
Turnout		179,071	81.8	▼2.4			
CDU hold	Majority	21,504	12.2				
