= Kirchheim (Neckar) station =

Railway station in Kirchheim am Neckar, Germany

Kirchheim (Neckar)
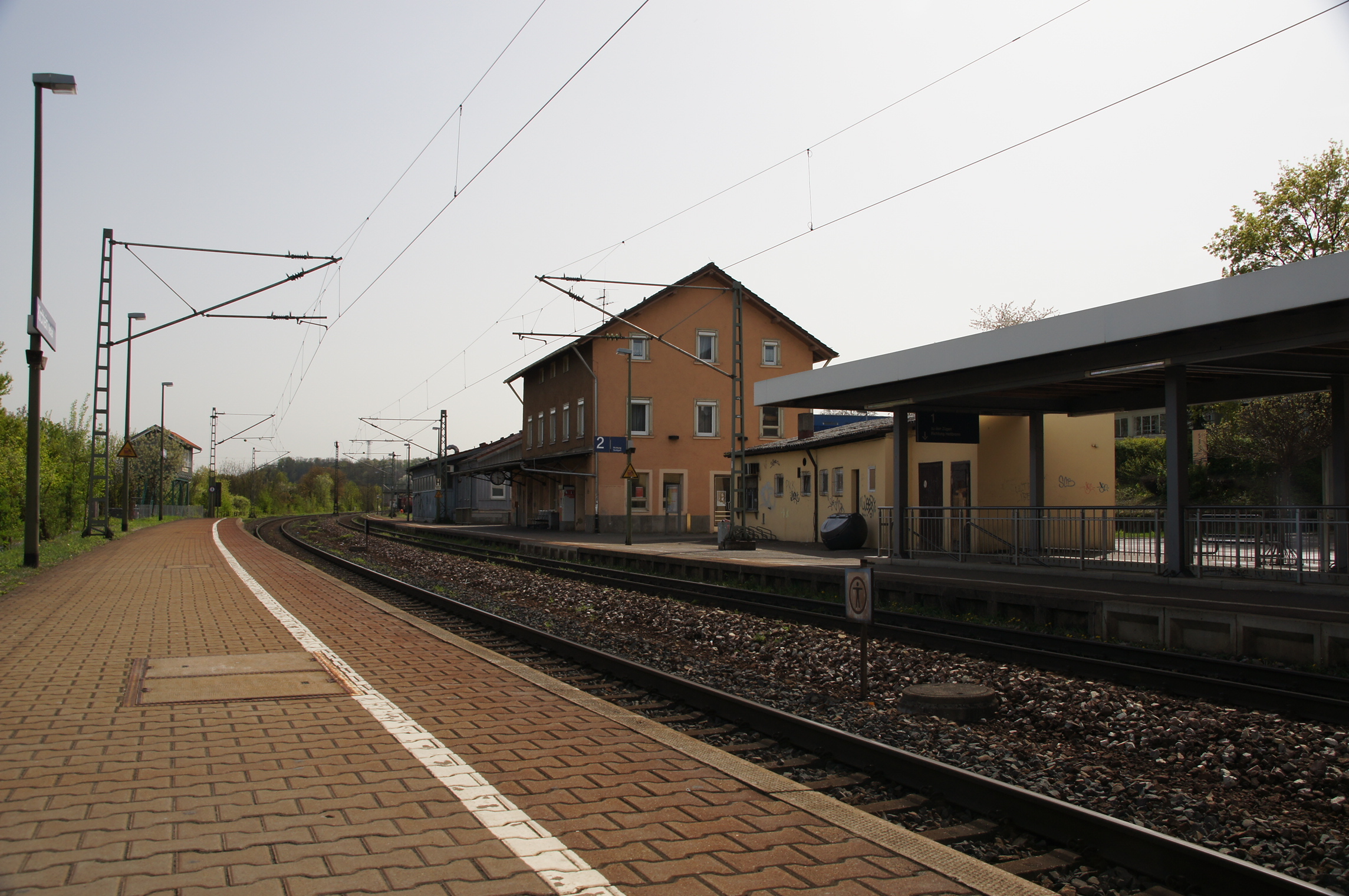
- Kirchheim station

General information
- Location: Bahnhofstraße 1, Kirchheim am Neckar, Baden-Württemberg; Germany
- Coordinates: 49°02′15″N 9°09′02″E
- Line: Franconia Railway
- Platforms: 2

Construction
- Accessible: Yes

Other information
- Station code: 3193
- DS100 code: TKM
- IBNR: 8003278
- Category: 5
- Fare zone: HNV: 156; : 5
- Website: www.bahnhof.de

History
- Opened: 25 July 1848
Location

Kirchheim (Neckar) station is located at line-kilometre 35.2 on the Franconia Railway (Frankenbahn) in Kirchheim am Neckar in the German state of Baden-Württemberg. According to the Railway Construction and Operating Regulations, it is considered to be a Haltepunkt (roughly: "halt"), not a station.

== History ==
The line from Stuttgart to Heilbronn was opened by the Royal Württemberg State Railways (Königlich Württembergischen Staats-Eisenbahnen) as the Northern Railway (Nordbahn). A station was built in the southeast of the village of Kirchheim with its approximately 1,700 inhabitants. Between Besigheim and Kirchheim, the line ran along the left (western) bank of the Neckar. North of Kirchheim, the railway runs through the Kirchheim Tunnel, which was built to reach Lauffen. Construction began in the Kirchheim district on 1 April 1846. Fischergasse and parts of the old walls at the Neckartor had to be demolished for the line.

The Northern Railway was opened on 25 July 1848. The now disused but preserved two-storey entrance building and the railway tracks were built above flood level. The station also had a postal depot. A stagecoach service ran between the postal depot and Kirchheim and Bönnigheim.

The population quickly recognised the advantage of the new means of transport. Craftsmen could travel quickly to markets in Heilbronn or Ludwigsburg and were able to sell their goods more easily. Day labourers did not have to live in the big cities next to their factories, but could instead live with their families and commute.

The Kirchheim Tunnel required a second bore for the doubling of the line. The State Railways took the second track between Bietigheim and Nordheim into operation on 15 September 1894.

The people of Neckarwestheim and Gemmrigheim had the disadvantage that they had to use a ferry over the Neckar at Kirchheim, despite its proximity to the station. They also had to pay a fare to use for each person and wagon. Discussions were initiated in 1894 between the mayors of Kirchheim, Neckarwestheim and Gemmrigheim. The three municipalities planned the construction of a bridge over the Neckar between Kirchheim and Gemmrigheim. In August 1895, King William II signed the planning permission. The bridge was inaugurated on 2 September 1897. This led to an increase in the amount of goods loaded at the station.

The post office established the first telephone connection in Kirchheim at the station in 1904. The State Railway took responsibility for the postal service off the stationmaster on 21 April 1906.

On 4 April 1945, the remaining troops of the Wehrmacht blew up the railway bridge over the Mühlgasse. The explosion was so strong that the surrounding houses were damaged. The Neckar bridge was demolished on 8 April 1945. Its reconstruction was delayed. The ferry service ran again between Kirchheim and Gemmrigheim until the opening of the new bridge in 1950.

Deutsche Bundesbahn electrified the Bietigheim–Heilbronn line on 1 June 1959.

== Operations ==
The station is served by Regionalbahn trains. Trains to Heilbronn, Neckarsulm and Würzburg stop at platform 1 and trains to Stuttgart stop at platform 2. In the late hours RE 8 trains on the Stuttgart–Würzburg route stop in Kirchheim.

Route		Frequency
MEX 12	Stuttgart – Ludwigsburg – Bietigheim – Kirchheim – Heilbronn (– Mosbach-Neckarelz)	Every 60 minutes
MEX 18	Tübingen – Reutlingen – Nürtingen – Wendlingen – Plochingen – Stuttgart – Ludwigsburg – Bietigheim-Bissingen – Kirchheim – Heilbronn – Neckarsulm – Bad Friedrichshall – Osterburken	Every 60 minutes

Kirchheim (Neckar) station is classified by Deutsche Bahn as a category 5 station.
