= Besigheim station =

Railway station in Besigheim, Germany

Besigheim
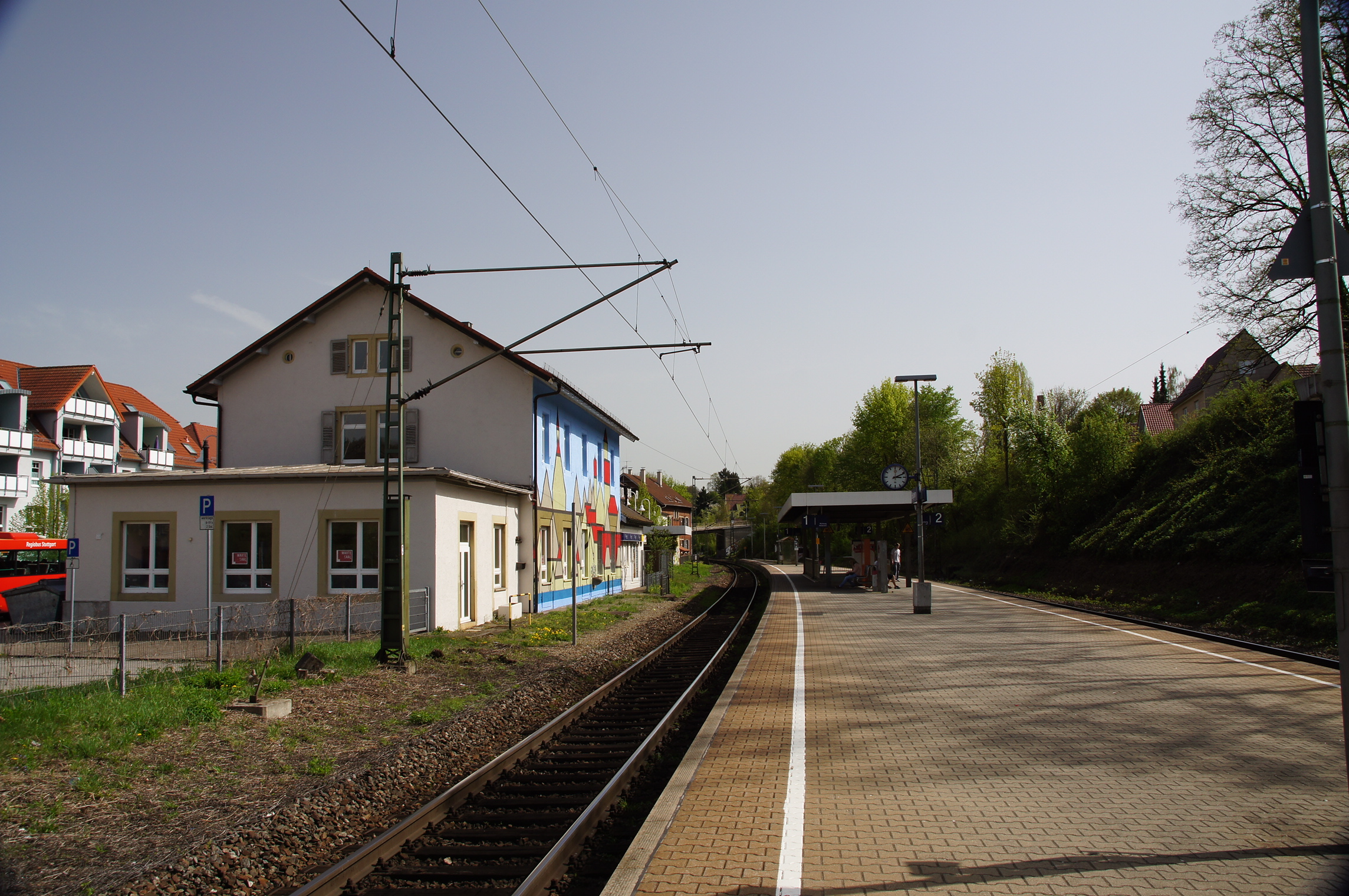
- Besigheim station

General information
- Location: Weinstraße 2, Besigheim, Baden-Württemberg; Germany
- Coordinates: 48°59′51″N 9°08′11″E
- Line: Franconia Railway
- Platforms: 2

Construction
- Accessible: No

Other information
- Station code: 588
- DS100 code: TBE
- IBNR: 8000925
- Category: 5
- Fare zone: : 4 and 5
- Website: www.bahnhof.de

History
- Opened: 25 July 1848
Location

Besigheim station is located at line-kilometre 29.8 on the Franconia Railway (Frankenbahn) in Besigheim in the German state of Baden-Württemberg. According to the Railway Construction and Operating Regulations, it is considered to be a Haltepunkt (roughly: "halt"), not a station.

== History ==
From the beginning of planning for the Northern Railway (Nordbahn), which would connect Stuttgart with Heilbronn, the Besigheim councilors showed a keen interest in a connection. The Besigheim Oberamt (council) at that time, including the Husarenhof, had approximately 2,400 inhabitants. The town’s leaders hoped that a route by Besigheim would promote rapid industrialisation.

The Northern Railway between Bietigheim and Heilbronn was opened on 25 July 1848 by the Royal Württemberg State Railways (Königlich Württembergischen Staats-Eisenbahnen). Besigheim station was situated about 500 metres outside the town in meadows and fields near the road to Löchgau. The two-storey entrance building remained the only building west of the bridge over the Enz until 1850. The town only began to grow in this direction later. It started with one house (now at Bahnhofstrasse 19) and the Zur Eisenbahn inn a year later, in 1851.

The council now expressed negative views on the railway and noted the disadvantages. The population consisted mostly of poor winemaking families. They received no benefit from a quick link to the major cities. On the contrary, the railway line reduced their ability to manage their vineyards, because the line ran right past them. Craft shops closed, since the factories offered higher wages. Transit traffic declined on the once important state road. The council noted that this not only affected the inns, which hosted the carters and travellers, but also the town administration, which reported declining revenues from its toll for road and bridge maintenance (Wegzoll).

The situation changed in 1868. With the building of a bridge across the Neckar, east of Besigheim, the inhabitants of the villages of Mundelsheim, Hessigheim and Ottmarsheim could now reach the town and the station more quickly. The number of passengers and the amount of goods dispatched rose—especially sugar and chicory.

In 1873, the Trikotwarenfabrik Mattes, Lutz & Müller knitwear factory was the first industrial company established in Besigheim. At the end of 1874, the local business association urged an extension of the station, but the state railway declined.

In 1880, the royal government declared that Besigheim’s toll for road and bridge maintenance was outdated. The town had to continue without the Wegzoll and lost a source of income.

In 1883, the old oil mill on the Neckar was converted into an industrial mill and it was renamed in 1889 as the Besigheimer Ölfabrik ("Besigheim oil factory"). After a major fire in 1904, the management decided to move to a new location north of the station (now BASF). This allowed a railway siding to be built to the factory.

In 1888, the post office moved into a new building in the immediate vicinity of the station. The vacant spaces in the station building were now available for the State Railways, once again delaying the need to enlarge the building.

The State Railways opened a second track between Bietigheim and Nordheim on 15 September 1894. It expanded the station building with a single-storey annex on its northern side in 1901.

There was an air raid on the railway tracks and Bietigheimer Straße on 1 April 1945. Four people were killed.

Deutsche Bundesbahn completed the electrification of the line between Bietigheim and Heilbronn on 1 June 1959. The station building received an additional single-storey annex on its southern side.

In the 1990s, the council increasingly campaigned for the reconstruction of the station forecourt. This was carried out in 1999. A new commercial building and parking for rail passengers emerged. Besigheim station was downgraded to a halt, as it no longer had any sidings.

== Operations ==
Trains to Heilbronn, Neckarsulm, Osterburken and Würzburg stop at platform 1 and trains to Stuttgart stop at platform 2.

Regional services (2025)
MEX 12	Tübingen – Reutlingen – Metzingen – Nürtingen – Plochingen – Stuttgart – Bietigheim-Bissingen – Besigheim – Heilbronn (– Mosbach-Neckarelz)	60 minutes	SWEG Bahn Stuttgart
MEX 18	Tübingen – Reutlingen – Metzingen – Nürtingen – Wendlingen – Plochingen – Stuttgart – Ludwigsburg – Bietigheim-Bissingen – Besigheim – Heilbronn – Neckarsulm – Bad Friedrichshall – Osterburken	60 minutes	SWEG Bahn Stuttgart

Besigheim station is classified by Deutsche Bahn as a category 5 station.
