= Neckarwestheim =

- Municipality
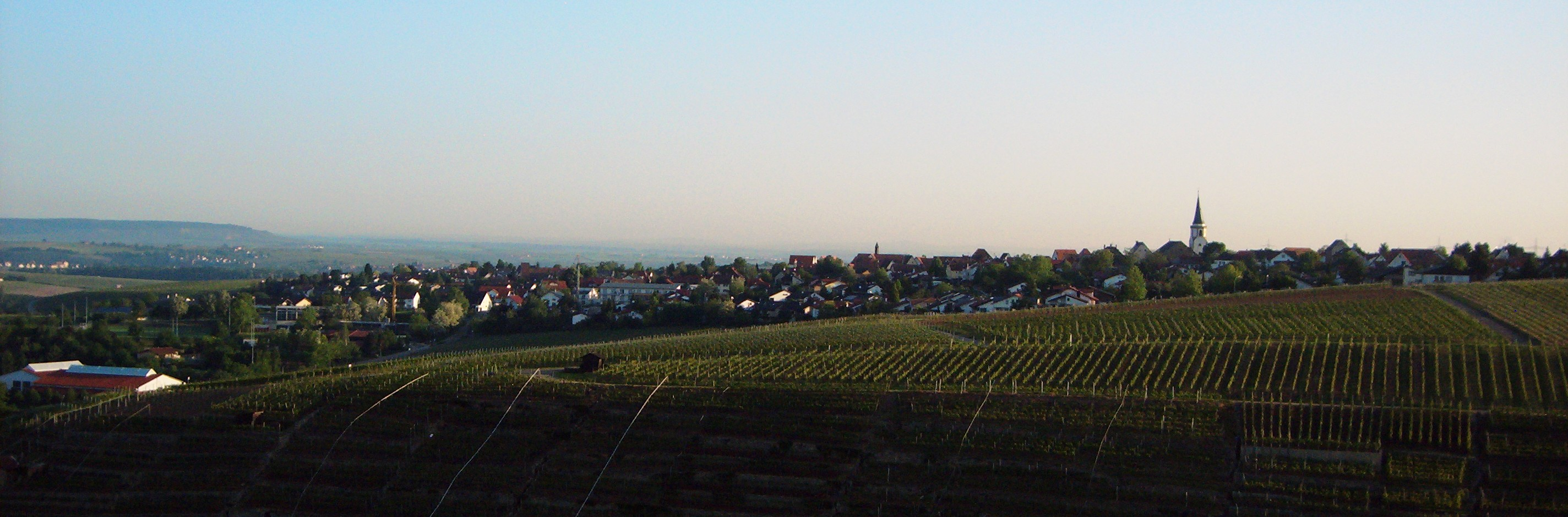

- Coat of arms

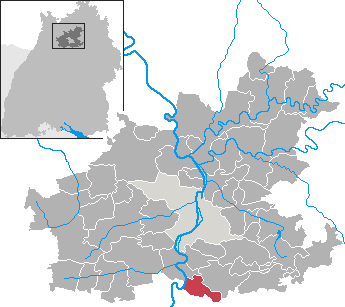
- Location of Neckarwestheim within Heilbronn district
- Interactive map of Neckarwestheim
- Location within Germany Location within Baden-Württemberg
- Coordinates: 49°3′N 9°11′E
- Country: Germany
- State: Baden-Württemberg
- Admin. region: Stuttgart
- District: Heilbronn

Government
  - Mayor (2024–32): Jochen Winkler

Area
  - Total: 13.97 km^{2} (5.39 sq mi)
- Elevation: 254 m (833 ft)

Population (2025-12-31)
  - Total: 3,979
  - Density: 284.8/km^{2} (737.7/sq mi)
- Time zone: UTC+01:00 (CET)
  - Summer (DST): UTC+02:00 (CEST)
- Postal codes: 74382
- Dialling codes: 07133
- Vehicle registration: HN
- Website: www.neckarwestheim.de

Neckarwestheim (German: [nɛkaʁˈvɛstˌhaɪ̯m]) is a municipality with 3524 inhabitants in the Heilbronn district, Baden-Württemberg, in south-west Germany. It is located on the Neckar river and is well known as the location of a nuclear power station, the Neckarwestheim Nuclear Power Plant.

== Geography ==
=== Geographical position ===
Neckarwestheim is located in the south of the District of Heilbronn.

=== Neighbouring municipalities ===
Neighbouring towns and municipalities of Neckarwestheim are (clockwise): Lauffen (Neckar), Ilsfeld (both in the same district), Großbottwar, Mundelsheim, Besigheim, Gemmrigheim and Kirchheim (Neckar) (all of the district of Ludwigsburg).

== History ==
Neckarwestheim was first mentioned on March 5, 1123, in a document of Holy Roman Emperor Henry V called Westheim. In 1673, the region was called Württemberg and the town was renamed to Kaltenwesten. On August 19, 1884, it was renamed in Neckarwestheim by a royal decree. In 1938 the district was named Heilbronn.

After World War II, the currently agricultural town received many refugees and exiles of the East. In the 1970s, the nuclear power station of Neckarwestheim was built on the previous area of a quarry. The taxes on this new power station enriched the municipal finances.

In 1995, Neckarwestheim was at the centre of attention in an internationally known scandal. The previous mayor, Horst Armbrust, was accused of having embezzled more than 40 million DM of the municipal funds. He put this money in different dubious investments and hoped for high yields. However, the money disappeared nearly without a trace. Armbrust was arrested and committed for trial on February 8, 1995. On January 24, 1996, he was sentenced by the Stuttgart district court to 8 1/2 years in prison for unfaithfulness and falsification of a document. On May 17, 1999, the Konstanz district court imposed this suspended sentence. By February 2005, the municipality succeeded in getting back around 13 million €. The court costs amount to 2 million €.

=== Religions ===
There is a separate Protestant parish in Neckarwestheim. The Catholic parish of Lauffen am Neckar is responsible for its Catholic Christians.

== Demographics ==
Population development:

Year	Inhabitants
1990	2,675
2001	3,505
2011	3,429
2021	4,091

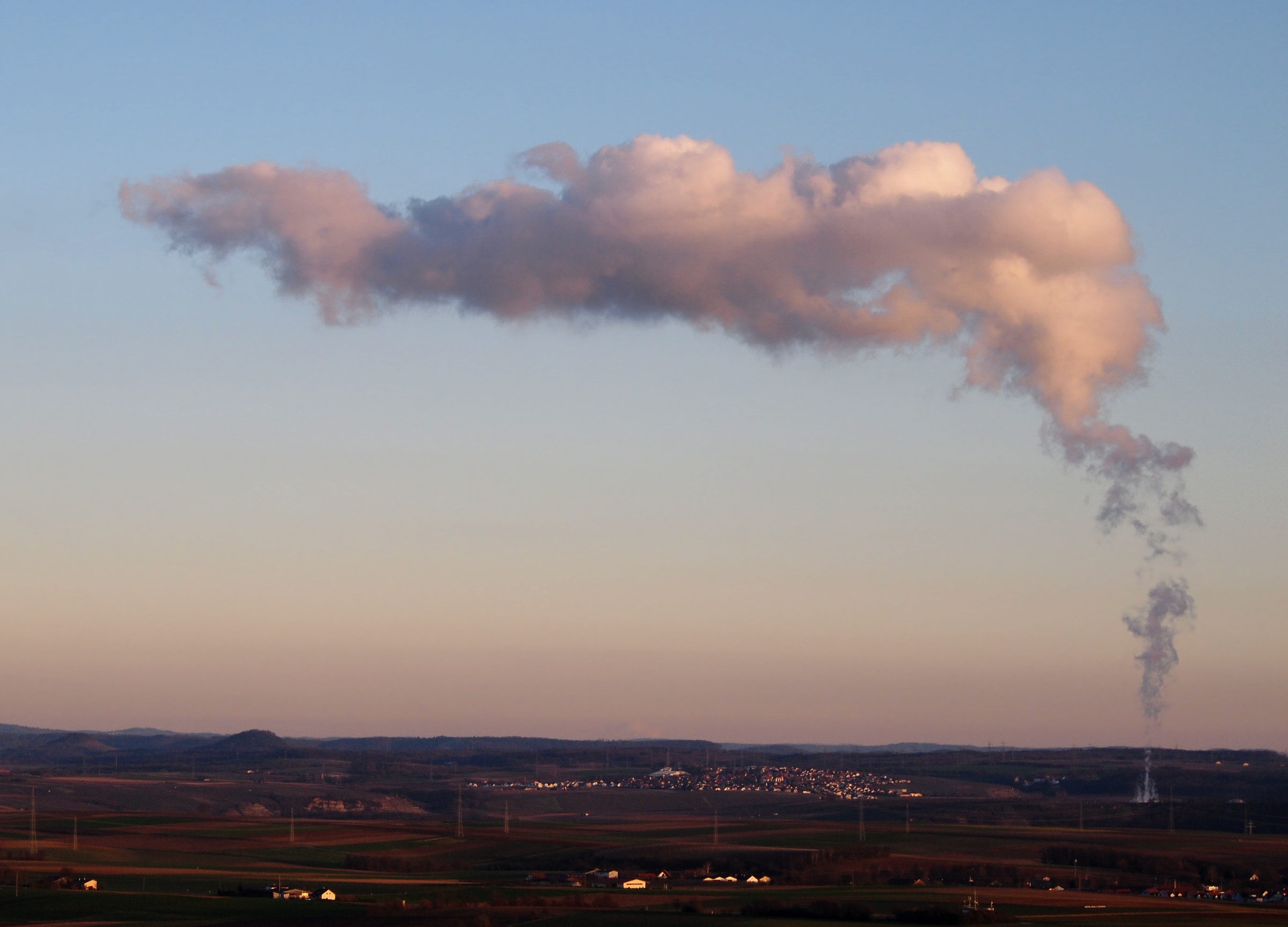
Neckarwestheim seen from Heuchelberg on a winter evening

== Nuclear power station ==
Neckarwestheim is the location of the nuclear power station Neckar (GKN) which has two pressurized water reactors, rated 741 and 1365 MW.

== Politics ==
=== Mayors ===
- 1977–1995: Horst Armbrust
- 1996–2016: Mario Dürr
- since 2016: Jochen Winkler

=== District council ===
In the communal election of June 13, 2004, the district council of Neckarwestheim got 12 seats. The result is as follows:

- CDU: 39.2% (-2.3), 5 seats (=)
- SPD: 33.5% (+3.4), 4 seats (=)
- Freie Bürgerbewegung Neckarwestheim: 27.3% (-1.0), 3 seats (=)

Further member of the district council and its chairman is the mayor.

=== Arms and flag ===
Blazon: In a split sign, in front a green wreath, behind in green a silver spade.

The flag of the municipality is green and white.

The spade was already shown in a seal of 1684. Until 1938 there was an arms with split sign and three branches. After the branches were replaced by the wreath of the 1684's arms. Simultaneous arms and flag were laid down and bestowed by the ministry of the interior on March 4, 1963.

=== Twin town ===
Neckarwestheim is twinned with:

- Ceton, France

== Culture and sights ==
=== Buildings ===
Liebenstein Castle was built in 1120. In 1982 it was bought by the municipality and passed on to an association. There is now a restaurant and a hotel at the castle. Next to the castle is a golf course.

== Economy and infrastructure ==
The most important enterprise of Neckarwestheim is its nuclear power station carried on by the EnBW.

=== Wine-growing ===
150 wine-growers of Neckarwestheim and Ilsfeld's district Schozach joined to the Wine-growing community Neckarwestheim eG. Neckarwestheim belongs to the wine area of Württemberg.

=== Traffic ===
Neckarwestheim is located near the A81 and the B27. The nearest stations are located in Lauffen (Neckar) and Kirchheim (Neckar).

=== Education ===
In the town there's a primary school. The local library has around 13,000 media at its disposal. Apart from three communal kindergartens there is also a Protestant one in the town.
