= Ingersheim =

- Municipality
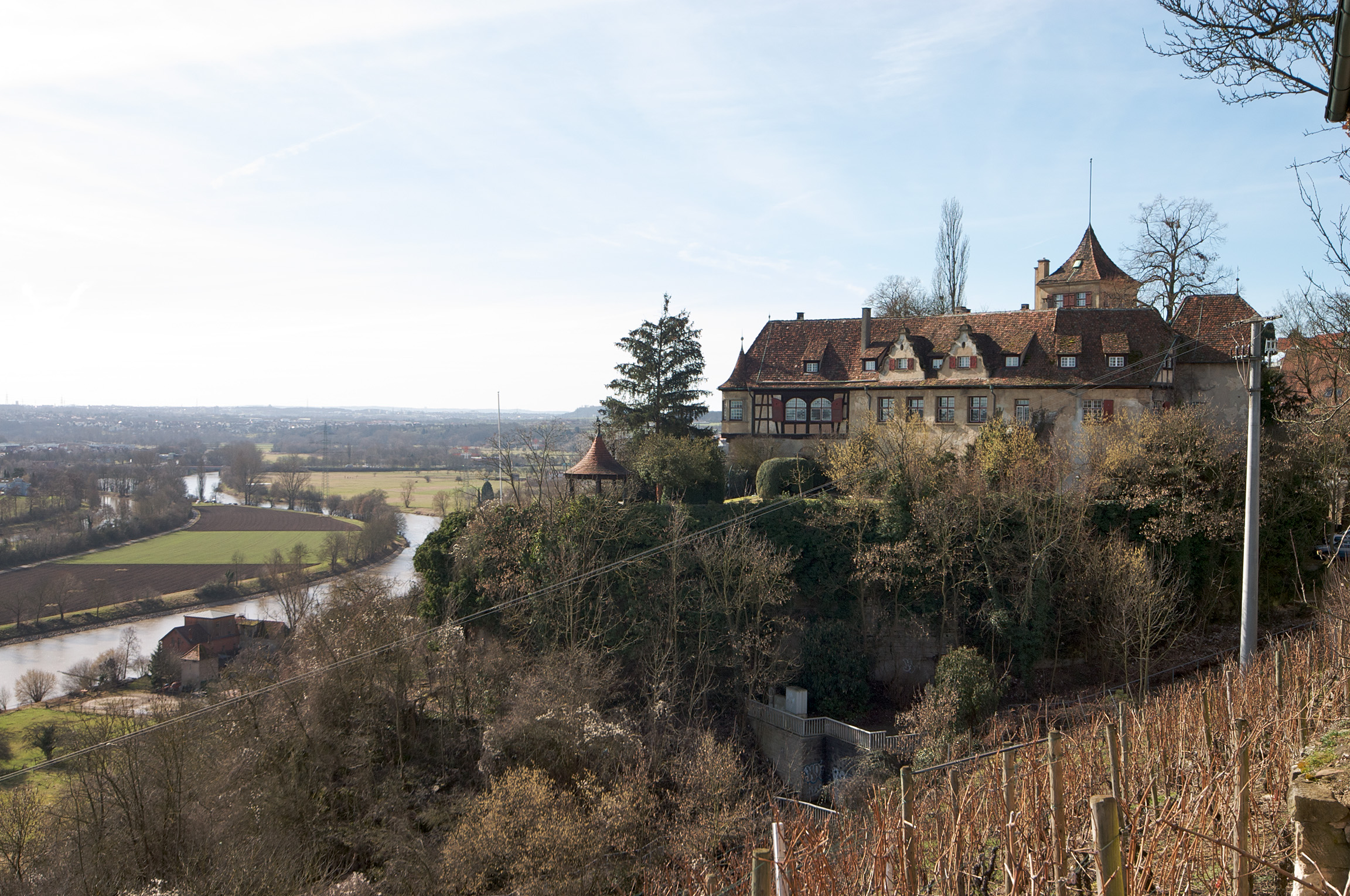
- Kleiningersheim Castle

- Coat of arms

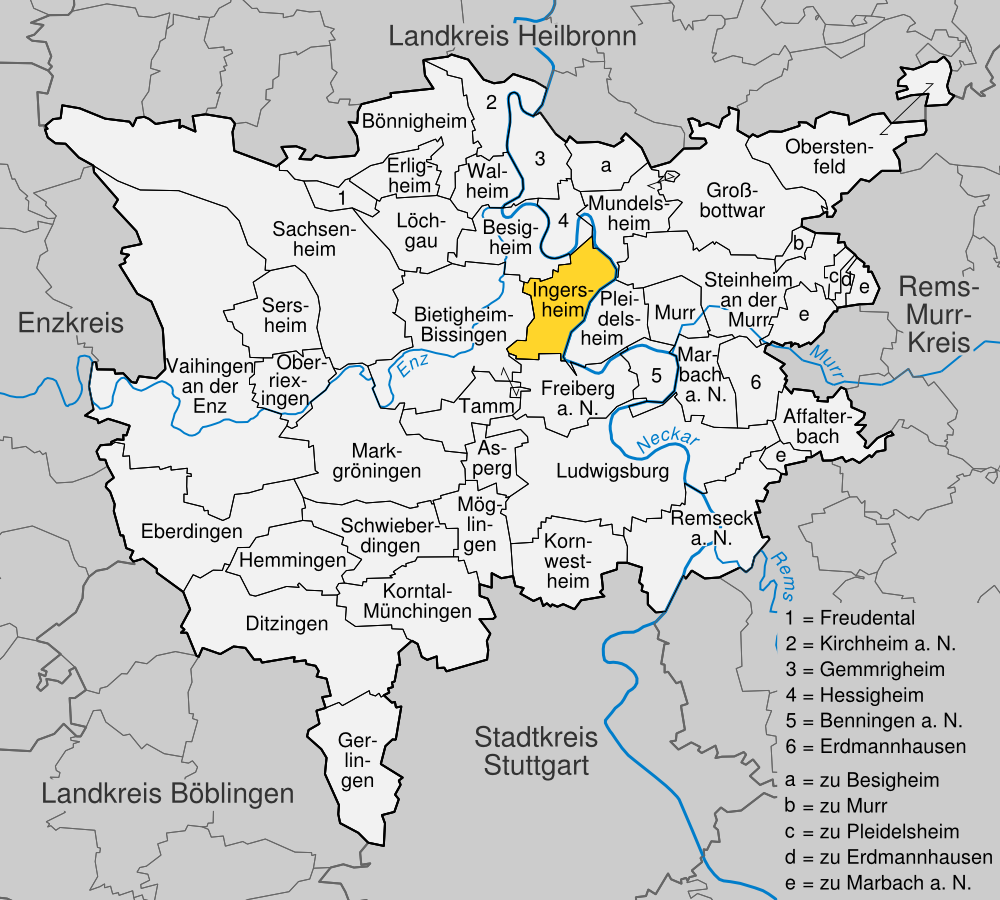
- Location of Ingersheim within Ludwigsburg district
- Interactive map of Ingersheim
- Location within Germany Location within Baden-Württemberg
- Coordinates: 48°57′40″N 9°10′55″E
- Country: Germany
- State: Baden-Württemberg
- Admin. region: Stuttgart
- District: Ludwigsburg

Government
  - Mayor (2020–28): Simone Haist

Area
  - Total: 11.55 km^{2} (4.46 sq mi)
- Elevation: 210 m (690 ft)

Population (2025-12-31)
  - Total: 6,277
  - Density: 543.5/km^{2} (1,408/sq mi)
- Time zone: UTC+01:00 (CET)
  - Summer (DST): UTC+02:00 (CEST)
- Dialling codes: 07142
- Vehicle registration: LB
- Website: www.ingersheim.de

Ingersheim (German pronunciation: [ˈɪŋɐshaɪm]; Swabian: Engersche) is a municipality in the district of Ludwigsburg in Baden-Württemberg in Germany, belonging to the Stuttgart Region.

== Geography ==
=== Geographical location ===
Ingersheim is located on the western bank of the Neckar about 20 kilometers north of Stuttgart. The lowest point is at 182 m above sea level at the Neckar, the highest point is at 310 m above sea level in the Gewand Bürkle. The eastern boundary of the district is essentially formed by the Neckar River, in the north by the Saalen Forest, in the west along the Bietigheim Forest and in the south by the Brandholz Forest.

=== Neighboring municipalities ===
The neighboring municipalities of Ingersheim are, the municipalities of Hessigheim in the north, Mundelsheim in the northeast, Pleidelsheim in the east, as well as the cities of Freiberg am Neckar in the south, Bietigheim-Bissingen in the west and Besigheim in the northwest. They all belong to the Ludwigsburg district as well.

=== Structure ===
Ingersheim consists of the formerly independent municipalities of Großingersheim and Kleiningersheim. The village Großingersheim belongs to the former municipality Großingersheim. The former municipality of Kleiningersheim includes the village of Kleiningersheim, the Talhof farm, and the mill of Kleiningersheim.

== History ==
=== Middle Ages ===
Ingersheim was first mentioned in a document of the Lorsch Monastery (Lorsch Codex) in 779. Whether it was Großingersheim or Kleiningersheim can no longer be determined. Most likely Großingersheim. In the area of Großingersheim, archaeological findings indicate an early medieval settlement from the Frankish-Merovingian period. In the early Middle Ages Ingersheim was a main settlement of the Counts of Calw with its own court.

At the beginning of the 15th century, Ingersheim became part of Baden, followed by Electoral Palatinate rule. In 1504 Ulrich von Württemberg took possession of the two present-day sub-villages, which have been part of Württemberg since then.

=== Modern times ===
After the foundation of the Kingdom of Württemberg, Ingersheim belonged to the Oberamt Bietigheim until 1810, and then to the Oberamt Besigheim. In 1938, in the course of a Württemberg territorial reform during the Nazi era, the suburbs of Groß- and Kleiningersheim, which had been formed in 1829, became part of the district of Ludwigsburg.

During World War II, Großingersheim was substantially destroyed in a bombing raid on December 16, 1944, and was initially occupied by French troops on April 21, 1945. After the war, however, the town became part of the American occupation zone and thus belonged to the newly founded state of Württemberg-Baden, which was absorbed into the current state of Baden-Württemberg in 1952.

Today's Ingersheim was formed on January 1, 1972, out of the two previously independent municipalities of Großingersheim and Kleiningersheim. The separation of the two "Ingersheims", which had only taken place in 1829, was thus reversed.

== Religions ==
Since the Reformation, Ingersheim has been predominantly Protestant. Even today, there is a Protestant parish in each of the two districts. While the Roman Catholic congregation in Pleidelsheim is responsible for the Catholics, there is a Methodist congregation in Ingersheim. The New Apostolic Church also has its own congregation in Ingersheim. In 1981, the previously independent congregations of the two districts were united in a new church in Großingersheim.

== Politics ==
The municipal council in Ingersheim has 18 members. The most recent municipal election on was held on 26 May 2019. The municipal council consists of the elected honorary municipal councillors and the mayor as chairman. The mayor is entitled to vote in the municipal council.

Party	% 2019	Seats 2019	% 2014	Seats 2014
FW	34.9	6	32.3	6
SPD-FB	22.9	4	25.0	4
CDU	16.9	3	23.4	4
WIR	11.5	2	10.8	2
MiT	8.1	2	-	-
FDP	5.7	1	-	-
GRÜNE	-	-	8.5	2

=== Mayors ===
- 1945-1964: Karl Braun (SPD)
- 1964-1996: Martin Maier
- 1996-2020: Volker Godel (FDP)
- since 2020: Simone Haist

=== Coat of arms ===
The municipal coat of arms shows on red a silver anchor with a silver rope. The municipal flag is white-red. Coat of arms and flag were awarded to the municipality on December 18, 1972.

The anchor is proven since the 18th century as a marker of both places, which already formed a common municipality until 1829. It refers to the navigation on the Neckar. Later, the Großingersheim coat of arms was "In gold a blue anchor with a blue rope," the Kleiningersheim one "In red a silver anchor." Kleiningersheim was also awarded a municipal flag in the colors white and red on June 11, 1955. After the renewed merger of Groß- and Kleiningersheim in 1972, the Großingersheim form of the anchor and the colors of Kleiningersheim were adopted.

=== Coat of arms of the two villages ===
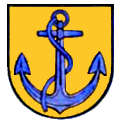
Großingersheim

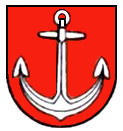
Kleiningersheim

=== Partnerships ===
The partner community since 1999 is the French community of the same name, Ingersheim in Alsace.
