= Fabian Gramling =

German politician (born 1987)

Fabian Gramling MdB
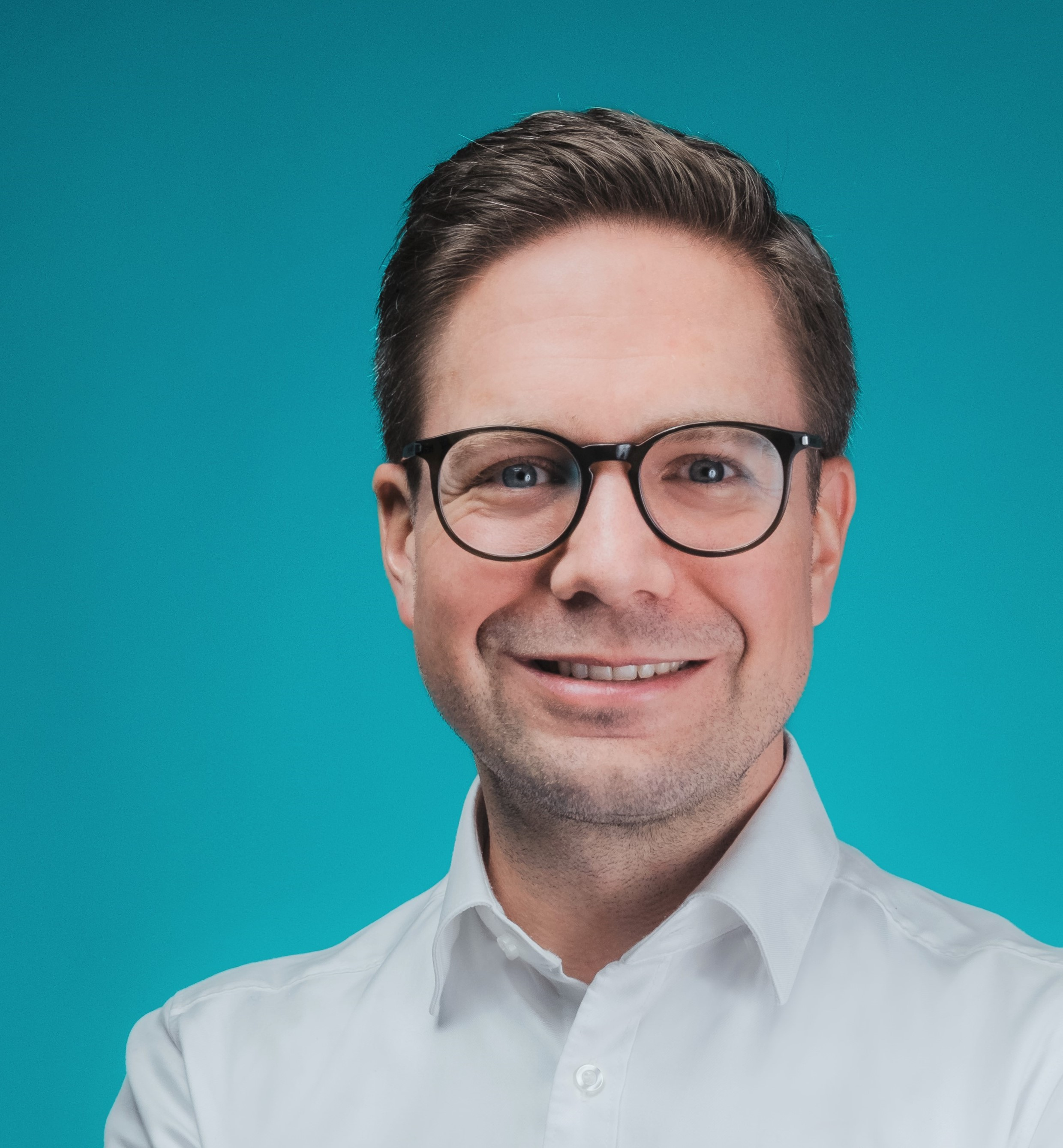
- Gramling in 2024

Member of the Bundestag; for Neckar-Zaber
- Incumbent
- Assumed office 26 October 2021
- Preceded by: Eberhard Gienger

Member of the; Landtag of Baden-Württemberg; for Bietigheim-Bissingen
- In office 2016–2021
- Preceded by: Thomas Reusch-Frey
- Succeeded by: Tobias Vogt

Personal details
- Born: 5 April 1987 (age 39) Stuttgart, West Germany
- Party: Christian Democratic Union

Fabian Benedikt Meinrad Gramling (born 5 April 1987 in Stuttgart) is a German politician of the CDU who has been serving as a member of the German Bundestag since 2021. He was previously a member of the Baden-Württemberg state parliament from 2016 to 2021.

== Education and early career ==
Having graduated from the Maximilian-Lutz-Realschule in Besigheim, Fabian Gramling apprenticed as a bank clerk at Kreissparkasse Ludwigsburg from 2004 to 2007. After completing his vocational training, he worked in customer services for six months before completing his general higher education entrance qualification at the business college in Stuttgart from 2007 to 2009. From 2009 to 2012, Gramling studied business administration at the Baden-Württemberg Cooperative State University (DHBW) in Stuttgart, specializing in accounting and controlling in cooperation with the auditing firm PricewaterhouseCoopers.

After completing his bachelor's degree, Gramling began working as an audit manager in the auditing department at PricewaterhouseCoopers. Gramling studied part-time at Pforzheim University of Applied Sciences from 2012 to 2015, where he obtained a Master of Arts specialising in taxation, accounting and business law. During his work in auditing, Gramling was a lecturer in trade tax at DHBW.

== Political career ==
=== Career in state politics ===
In the 2016 state parliamentary elections, Gramling won 25.7% of the vote for the CDU in the Bietigheim-Bissingen state parliamentary constituency and entered the Baden-Württemberg state parliament as a runner-up.

From 2016 to 2021, Gramling served as a member of the State Parliament of Baden-Württemberg. During that time, he was his parliamentary group’s spokesperson on labour policy. He represented the group in the committees on economics, labour and housing, as well as Europe and international affairs. Gramling was a member of the 16th Federal Assembly for the election of the Federal President as a delegate sent by the Baden-Württemberg state parliament.

At the 71st state party conference of the CDU Baden-Württemberg on 9 September 2017, Gramling was elected to the state executive of his party. He is Chairman of the CDU Stuttgart region and has been a member of the CDU district executive in the Ludwigsburg district since 2013. He was also a member of the state executive board from 2011 to 2017, deputy state chairman of the Junge Union Baden-Württemberg from 2015, and chairman of the Commission for Digitalisation, Innovation and Start-Ups. From 2011 to 2012, he was district chairman of the Junge Union in the Ludwigsburg district.

=== Member of the German Parliament (2021–present) ===
After the previous direct candidate, Eberhard Gienger, did not run again, Gramling was elected to the Bundestag in 2021, representing the Neckar-Zaber district. In parliament, he has since been serving on the Committee on Climate Action and Energy. Gramling won the direct mandate in the 2021 federal election with 30.4 per cent of the first votes.

For the CDU/CSU parliamentary group in the Bundestag, Gramling is a full Committee on Climate Protection and Energy member and a deputy member of the Committee on Economic Affairs and the Environment. In this capacity, he is his parliamentary group's rapporteur on games and video games.

In addition, he is the chairman of the association that promotes youth sports in the Ludwigsburg district and a member of the Urlaubskinder e.V. association.

== Political positions ==
During the COVID-19 pandemic in Germany, Gramling spoke out in favour of compulsory vaccination in November 2021. In April 2022, he campaigned in favour of a preventive vaccination law, as introduced to the Bundestag by the CDU/CSU parliamentary group.

Climate protection. In a press release, Gramling expressed his disappointment with the immediate action programme of the Climate Protection Minister, Robert Habeck, without, however, being specific. It remains unclear what Gramling has to criticise about the programme or what he would do better. Fabian Gramling rejects the protest methods of the Last Generation. Instead, he is in favour of using modern technologies for climate and environmental protection. In 2021, Gramling joined the Bundestag Committee on Climate Protection and Energy. In this context, he favours "innovations and technical solutions." Fabian Gramling calls for a hydrogen ramp-up in an article for the members' magazine of the Mittelstands- und Wirtschaftsunion. This would include a broadly diversified network, developing an import and transport infrastructure and utilising the country's own innovation potential.

Gramling is also a member of the Economic Committee of the German Bundestag and the Committee on the Environment, Nature Conservation, Nuclear Safety and Consumer Protection. In this role, he wants to show "that economy and ecology can go hand in hand." Fabian Gramling is in favour of establishing a hydrogen economy.

Concerning loot boxes, he favours more parental control and deposit limits.

Gramling has shown solidarity with farmers and their protests and is calling for the tax exemption on agricultural diesel to be retained. This would significantly reduce documentation requirements and provide investment security for livestock farmers when building stables.

== Other activities ==
- Nuclear Waste Disposal Fund (KENFO), Alternate Member of the Board of Trustees (since 2025)

== Personal life ==
Gramling is married, Catholic and lives in Bietigheim-Bissingen. In his youth, he played soccer for FV Löchgau. He is a supporter of VfB Stuttgart.
