= Freudental =

- Municipality
- Coat of arms

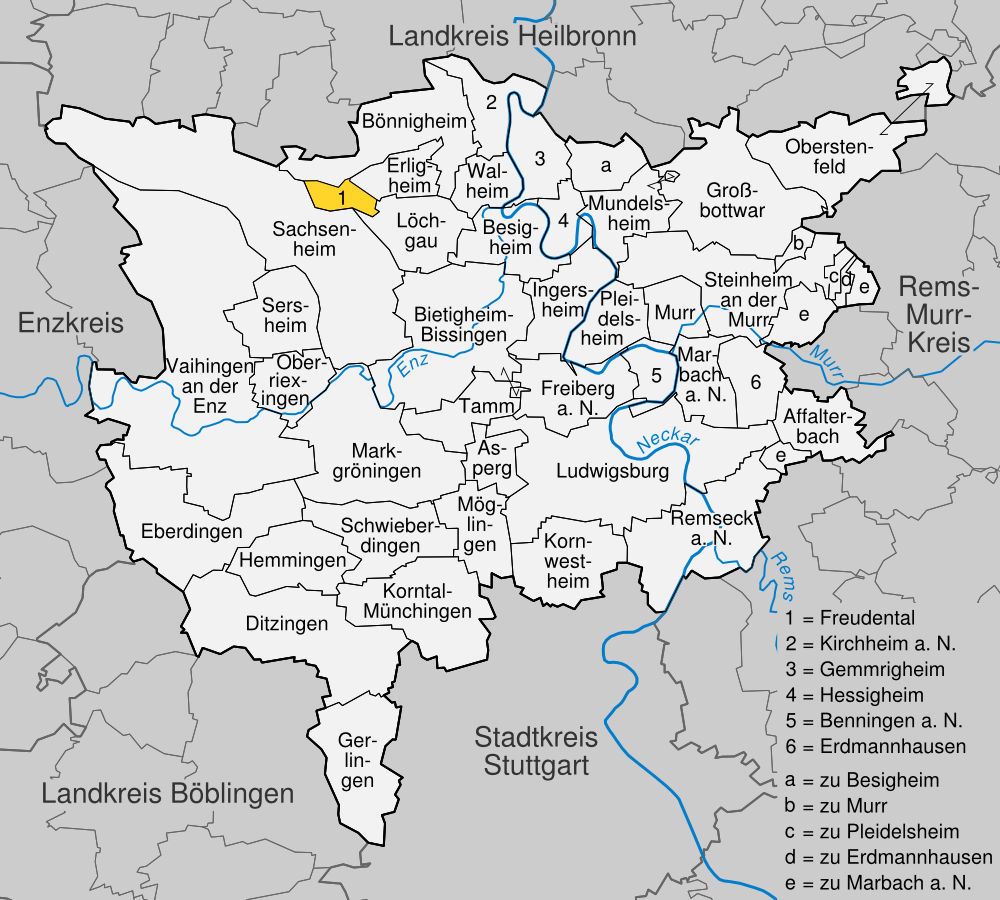
- Location of Freudental within Ludwigsburg district
- Interactive map of Freudental
- Location within Germany Location within Baden-Württemberg
- Coordinates: 49°0′32″N 9°3′32″E
- Country: Germany
- State: Baden-Württemberg
- Admin. region: Stuttgart
- District: Ludwigsburg

Government
  - Mayor (2020–28): Alexander Fleig

Area
  - Total: 3.07 km^{2} (1.19 sq mi)
- Elevation: 284 m (932 ft)

Population (2025-12-31)
  - Total: 2,554
  - Density: 832/km^{2} (2,150/sq mi)
- Time zone: UTC+01:00 (CET)
  - Summer (DST): UTC+02:00 (CEST)
- Postal codes: 74392
- Dialling codes: 07143
- Vehicle registration: LB
- Website: www.freudental.de

Freudental (German pronunciation: [ˈfʁɔʏdn̩taːl]) is a municipality in the district of Ludwigsburg, Baden-Württemberg, Germany.

== History ==
Freudental was first mentioned in 1304 in the stock records of the hospital in Esslingen. Similar to Besigheim and Löchgau it belonged to the Marquis of Baden, as a result of the Bavarian Succession War of 1504 it fell under Duke Ulrich of Württemberg and under the stewardship of the bailiff of Besigheim Konrad Schenk von Winterstetten. After changes and fragmentation of local government (1590/92 to 1685 Schaffelitzky of Mukkadell) in 1685 the town was solely owned by the Duke of Württemberg - Frederick Charles but soon sold again, to Baron Johann Gottlob von Zobel of Giebelstadt heir owner of the place. His heirs in turn sold the town in 1727 at the Landeshofmeisterin Wilhelmine of Würben. Around 1731–1733 Duke Eberhard Louis, acquired the town. The town was not incorporated into the Duchy of Württemberg, but protected as 'Hofkammergut' in the Württemberg 'Kameralverwaltung'. When the Württemberg Oberamt Besigheim was dissolved in 1938, Freudental came within the district of Ludwigsburg, where it remains.

== Religion ==
Freudental has been majority Protestant since the Reformation. Even today there is still a Protestant congregation in the town. There is also still a small community of the New Apostolic Church. The Catholics of the Roman Catholic community practice their religion in Besigheim.

From the first half of the 18th century there was a significant Jewish community in Freudental and by the mid-19th century more than 40 percent of the inhabitants were Jewish. In 1832 seat of Bezirksrabbinats Freudental. The town experienced - like many other Jewish rural communities - a decline in numbers towards the end of the 19th century. It was eventually eradicated by the persecution of the Jews during the Nazi regime. From the once significant community can still be seen the former synagogue built in 1770 in Freudental and the neighboring Jewish Schlössle, in which the first six Jewish families in the area from 1723 had apartments, and the Jewish cemetery (on Bönnigheimer Mountain). In memory of the persecuted and murdered Jewish citizens a memorial plaque is on the wall of the castle, more plaques have been placed since 1988 at the beginning and end of Strombergstrasse in remembrance of the centuries-old Jewish settlement in what was known locally as the "Jewish street".

During World War II many of the empty buildings which had once housed Jewish families were used to house refugee civilians from cities whose homes had been destroyed in allied bombing raids. After the war some of these refugees assisted the occupation forces in collecting reparations from the local farmers and landowners who had profited from the property 'vacated' by the Jewish population.

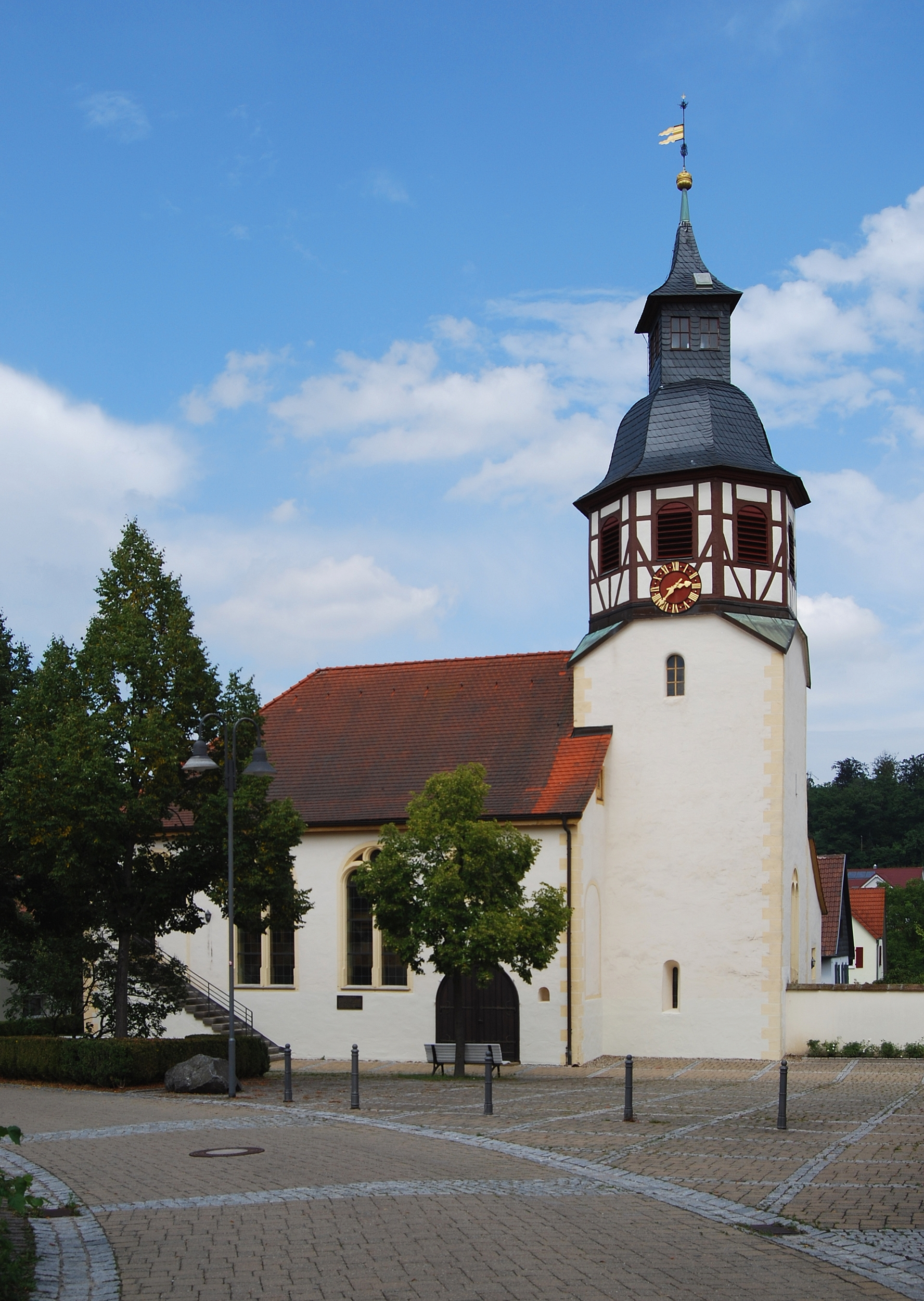
Evangelic church, 2013
