= Renate Hellwig =

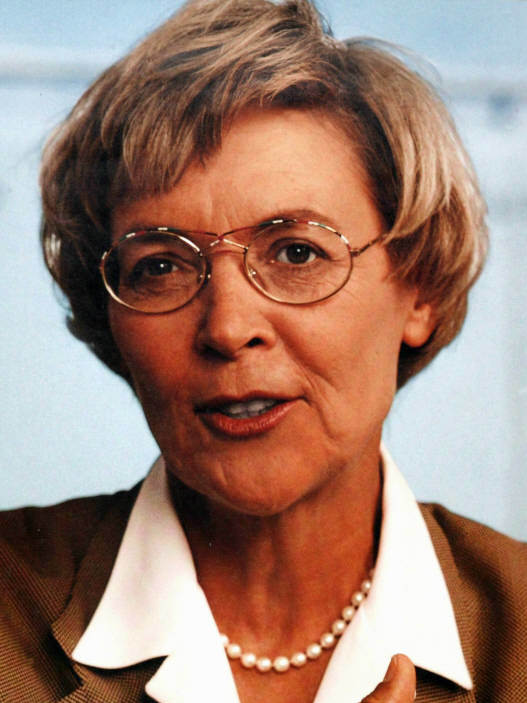
- Hellwig in 1998

Member of the Bundestag; for Neckar-Zaber
- In office 5 November 1980 – 26 October 1998
- Preceded by: Constituency established
- Succeeded by: Hans Martin Bury

Personal details
- Born: 19 February 1940 (age 86) Bytom, Upper Silesia, Germany
- Party: Christian Democratic Union

Renate Hellwig (born 19 February 1940 in Bytom, Upper Silesia) is a German politician from the Christian Democratic Union (CDU). She was a Member of the German Bundestag from 1980 to 1998.

== Education and career ==
Hellwig was born on 19 February 1940, the daughter of a Protestant goldsmith in Beuthen, Upper Silesia. She spent most of her youth in Munich, where she fled in 1945 with her mother.

Hellwig initially attended primary and secondary school, graduating from high school in Munich in 1959. She then studied law and economics, passing her state exams and receiving her doctorate in Munich in 1967. In 1968, she completed an internship with the European Community in Brussels, and one year later, she became a civil servant in the Federal Ministry of Labour and Social Affairs. From 1969 to 1972, she worked as a public relations officer in the Ministry of Education and Cultural Affairs of the state of Baden-Württemberg. From 1975 to 1980, she was State Secretary in the Ministry of Social Affairs, Health and the Environment of the state of Rhineland-Palatinate.

== Political activities ==
Hellwig joined the CDU in 1970, while still serving as a state secretary. From 1975 to 1989 she was a member of the federal executive committee of the Women's Union (Frauen-Union), and in 1985 she became a member of the federal executive committee of the CDU. From 1972 to 1975 she was a member of the Landtag of Baden-Württemberg, where she was a board member and spokesperson for higher education policy for the CDU parliamentary group. She represented the Stuttgart IV state constituency as a directly elected member of parliament. From 1980 to 1998 Hellwig was a member of the German Bundestag, and from 1983 to 1994 she was chairwoman of the European Commission and the EC Committee. She always won the direct mandate in the Neckar-Zaber constituency. In 2000 she was awarded the Medal of Merit of the State of Baden-Württemberg.

== Works ==
- Auslegung und Anwendung des Begriffs Unzuverlässigkeit im Gewerberecht. Univ., Diss.,München 1967
- Frauen verändern die Politik : eine gesellschaftspolitische Streitschrift. Verl. Bonn aktuell, Stuttgart 1975 ISBN 3-87959-040-0
- Unterwegs zur Partnerschaft : die Christdemokratinnen. Reihe: Frauen in der Politik. Seewald-Verl., Stuttgart 1984 ISBN 3-512-00706-6
- Der Deutsche Bundestag und Europa. mvg-Verl., München 1993 ISBN 3-87959-480-5

== Literature ==
- Rudolf Vierhaus, Ludolf Herbst (Hrsg.), Bruno Jahn (Mitarb.): Biographisches Handbuch der Mitglieder des Deutschen Bundestages. 1949–2002. Bd. 1: A–M. K. G. Saur, München 2002, ISBN 3-598-23782-0, S. 326.
- Ina Hochreuther: Frauen im Parlament. Südwestdeutsche Parlamentarierinnen von 1919 bis heute. 3. Auflage, Theiss-Verlag, Stuttgart 2012, ISBN 3-923476-15-9, S. 278f.
