= Erdmannhausen =

German municipality

- Municipality
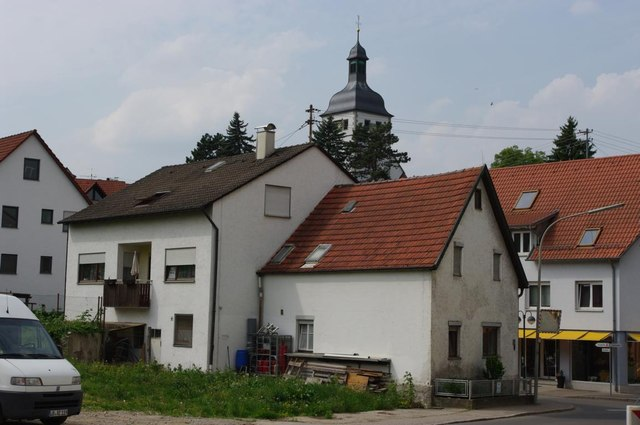
- Erdmannhausen, May 2011

- Coat of arms

- Location of Erdmannhausen within Ludwigsburg district
- Interactive map of Erdmannhausen
- Location within Germany Location within Baden-Württemberg
- Coordinates: 48°56′32″N 09°17′44″E
- Country: Germany
- State: Baden-Württemberg
- Admin. region: Stuttgart
- District: Ludwigsburg

Government
  - Mayor (2020–26): Marcus Kohler

Area
  - Total: 8.7 km^{2} (3.4 sq mi)
- Elevation: 269 m (883 ft)

Population (2025-12-31)
  - Total: 5,191
  - Density: 600/km^{2} (1,500/sq mi)
- Time zone: UTC+01:00 (CET)
  - Summer (DST): UTC+02:00 (CEST)
- Postal codes: 71729
- Dialling codes: 07144
- Vehicle registration: LB
- Website: www.erdmannhausen.de

Erdmannhausen (German pronunciation: [ɛʁtmanˈhaʊzn̩]) is a municipality in the district of Ludwigsburg in Baden-Württemberg in Germany.

== History ==
The village of Erdmannhausen became a possession of the Prince-Bishop of Speyer in 972, but would pass from the County of Calw to the County of Calw-Löwenstein, and then to the County of Württemberg. The Counts Württemberg began acquiring more and more of the village until it fully came under their control in 1425. From the 15th century to 1938, Erdmannhausen was assigned to the district of Marbach am Neckar, which was dissolved and replaced by Landkreis Ludwigsburg.

== Geography ==
The municipality (Gemeinde) of Erdmannhausen is located at the eastern extremity of the district of Ludwigsburg, in the German state of Baden-Württemberg, along the border with the Rems-Murr district. Erdmannhausen is physically located in the basin of the Neckar. Elevation above sea level in the municipal area ranges from a high of 378 meters (1,240 ft) Normalnull (NN) to a low of 198 meters (650 ft) NN.

== Politics ==
Erdmannhausen has one borough (Ortsteil), Erdmannhausen, and two villages, Bugmühle and Lemberghöfe. There are four abandoned villages, Äußeres Höfle, Eglolfshofen, Inneres Höfle, and Weikershausen.

=== Coat of arms ===
Erdmannhausen's coat of arms displays a crosier, in gold, upon a field of blue, below a yellow chief containing a black stag antler. The crosier is a reference to Murrhardt Abbey, which owned the Januariuskirche in Erdmannhausen, and the stag horn to Württemberg. This coat of arms was designed and accepted by Erdmannhausen's municipal council on 2 June 1954, and was confirmed on 19 October 1954 by the government of Baden-Württemberg and a municipal flag issued.

== Transportation ==
Erdmannhausen is connected to Germany's network of roadways by its local Landesstraßen and Kreisstraßen and to Germany's railway system by the Backnang–Ludwigsburg railway and the Stuttgart S-Bahn. Local public transportation is provided by the Verkehrs- und Tarifverbund Stuttgart.
