= Walheim =

- Municipality
- Coat of arms

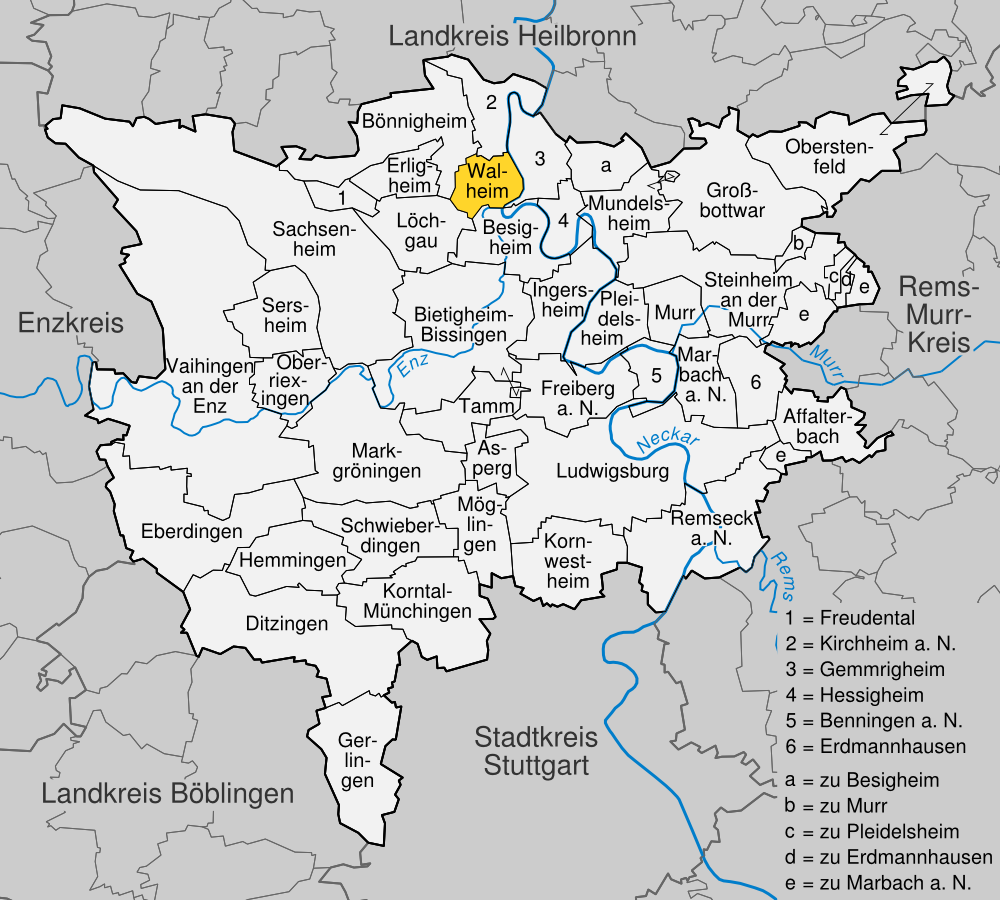
- Location of Walheim within Ludwigsburg district
- Interactive map of Walheim
- Location within Germany Location within Baden-Württemberg
- Coordinates: 49°0′42″N 9°9′10″E
- Country: Germany
- State: Baden-Württemberg
- Admin. region: Stuttgart
- District: Ludwigsburg

Government
  - Mayor (2018–26): Tatjana Scheerle

Area
  - Total: 6.14 km^{2} (2.37 sq mi)
- Elevation: 183 m (600 ft)

Population (2025-12-31)
  - Total: 3,305
  - Density: 538/km^{2} (1,390/sq mi)
- Time zone: UTC+01:00 (CET)
  - Summer (DST): UTC+02:00 (CEST)
- Postal codes: 74399
- Dialling codes: 07143
- Vehicle registration: LB
- Website: www.walheim.de

Walheim (German pronunciation: [ˈvaːlhaɪm]) is a town in the district of Ludwigsburg, Baden-Württemberg, Germany with a considerable viticulture. Besides the village Walheim there are no other places belonging to the municipal area of Walheim.

== Geography and climate ==
Walheim is situated in a height of 171 to 260 meters between the Neckar and the vineyards. The annual average temperature is 9.5 °C (49 °F) and the annual rainfall amounts to 700 L/m^{2}. Due to the mild climate the Walheim forest does not feature naturally located conifers, but mixed forest with a fairly big amount of oaks.

=== Historical geography ===
The abandoned village Dambach is situated in the municipal area of Walheim.

== History ==
Already in the Neolithic Age around 4000 to 2500 BC the area of Walheim was populated. A female skeleton found in 1980 has been dated to 1500 BC and therefore belongs to the Bronze Age. Starting 450 BC Celtic defense and living facilities have been built.

Many vestiges of the Romans can be found in Walheim: There are remnants of two Roman castra and a vast civil settlement. During the period of 85 to 120 AC the area of Walheim was an important emporium.

As from 233 AC the Alamanni began to settle the territory and in 496 AC the region became Franconian.

== Economy and infrastructure ==
Walheim is a town with a significant viticulture. Close by the town the Walheim power plant is located.

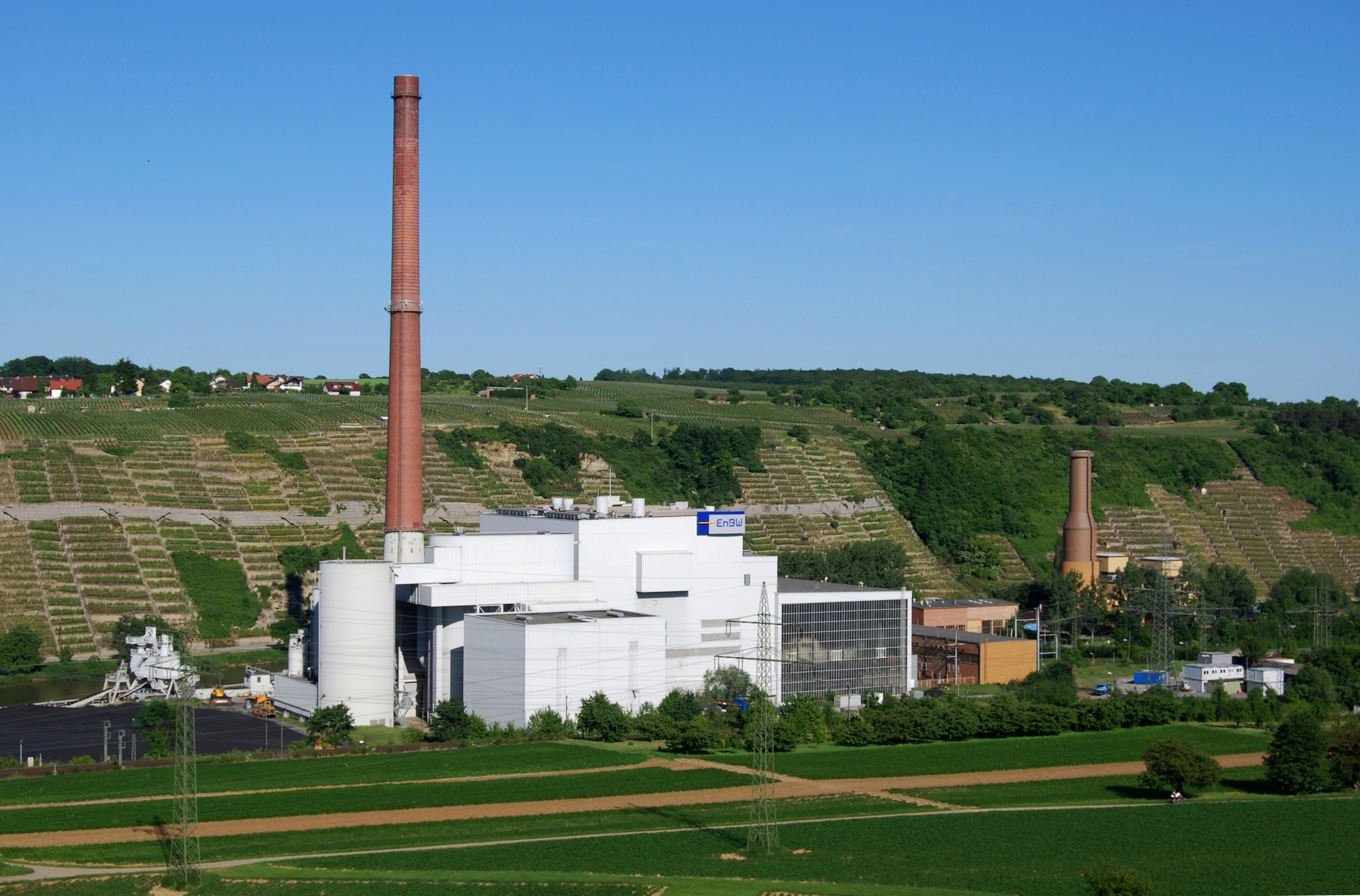
Walheim Power Plant

== Personalities ==
=== Sons and daughters of the community ===
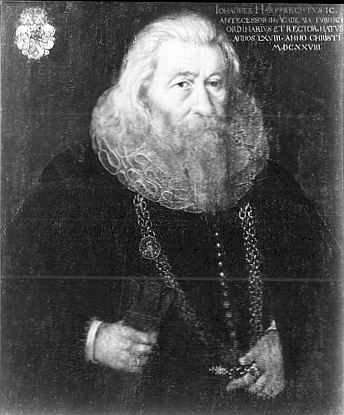
Johannes Christoph Harpprecht in 1628

- Johannes Christoph Harpprecht (1560-1639), professor of rights at the University of Tübingen

=== People who work or have worked in Walheim ===
- Philipp Ludwig Hermann Röder (1755-1831), from 1811 priest in Walheim
