= Pleidelsheim =

- Municipality
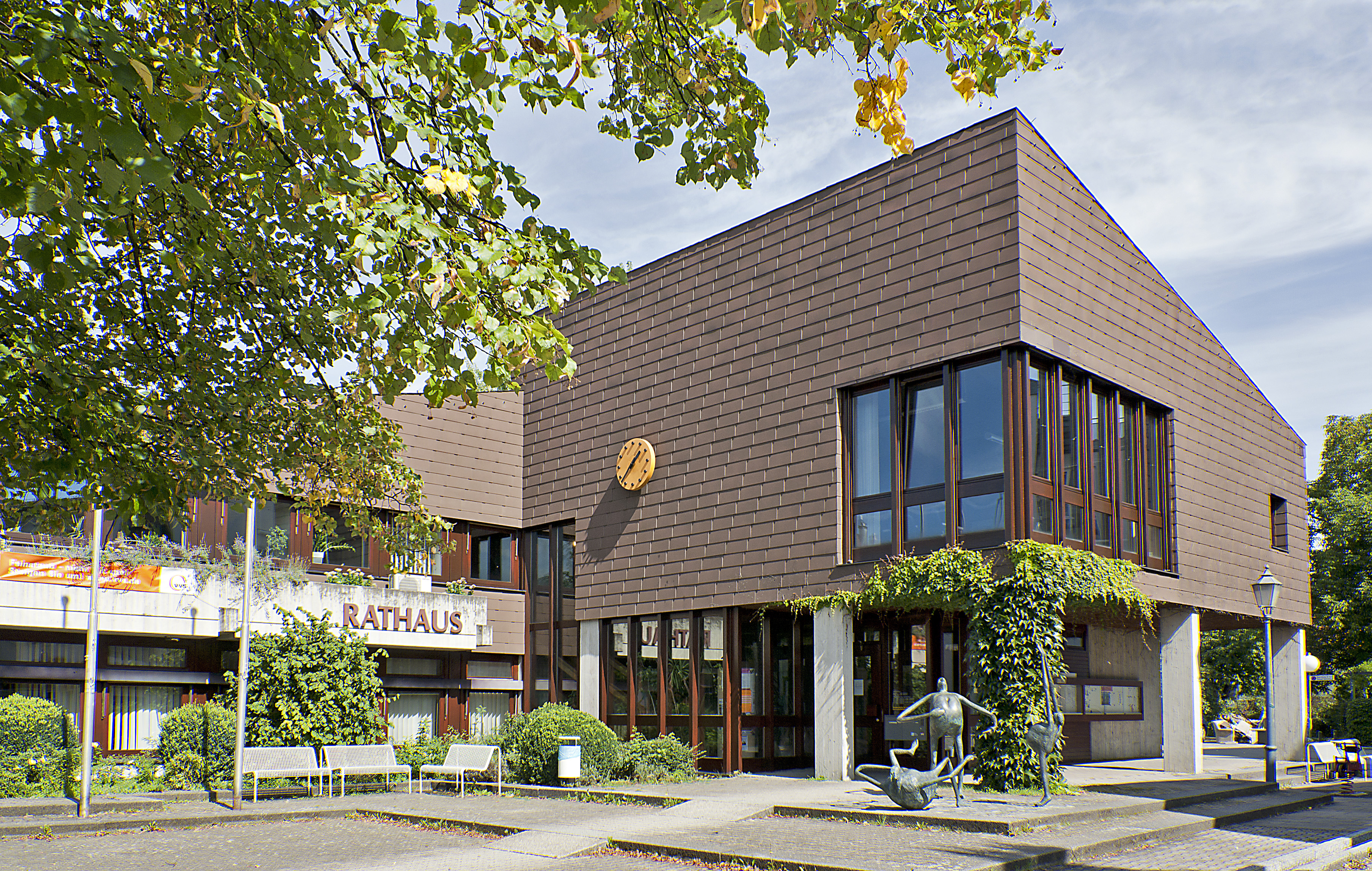
- New town hall

- Coat of arms

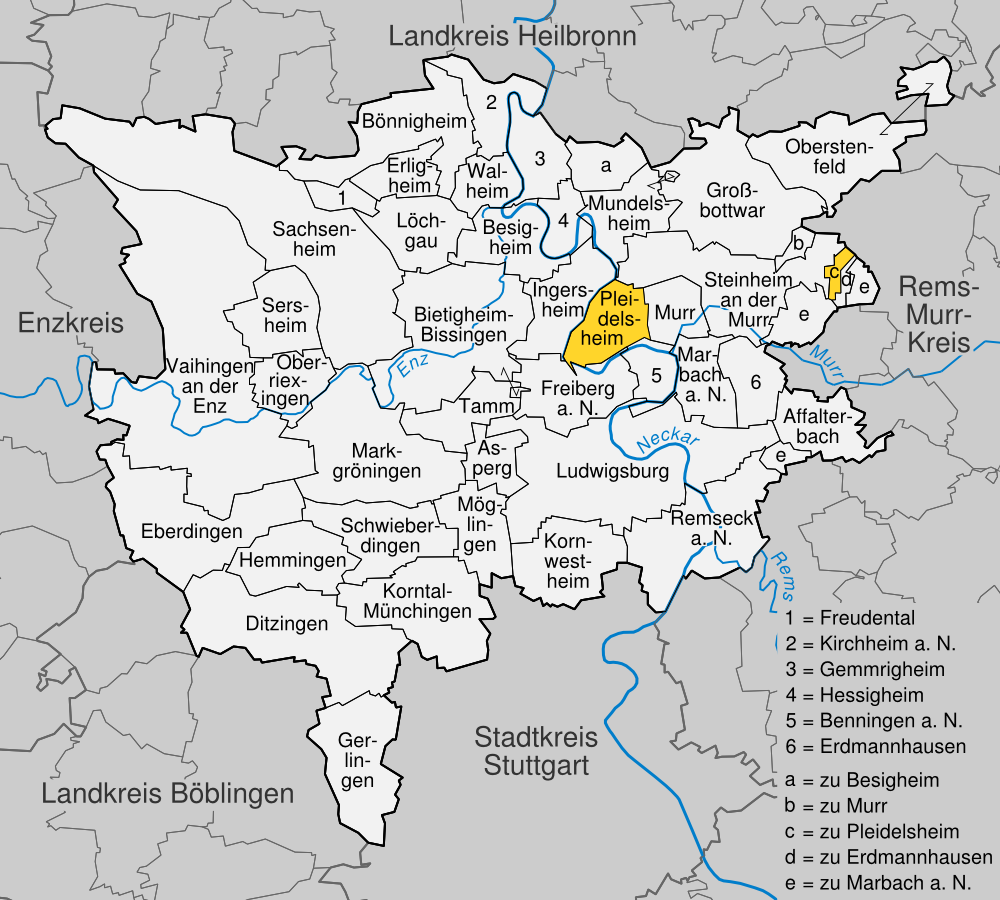
- Location of Pleidelsheim within Ludwigsburg district
- Interactive map of Pleidelsheim
- Location within Germany Location within Baden-Württemberg
- Coordinates: 48°57′41″N 9°12′15″E
- Country: Germany
- State: Baden-Württemberg
- Admin. region: Stuttgart
- District: Ludwigsburg

Government
  - Mayor (2017–25): Ralf Trettner

Area
  - Total: 10.18 km^{2} (3.93 sq mi)
- Elevation: 182–243 m (597–797 ft)

Population (2025-12-31)
  - Total: 6,096
  - Density: 598.8/km^{2} (1,551/sq mi)
- Time zone: UTC+01:00 (CET)
  - Summer (DST): UTC+02:00 (CEST)
- Postal codes: 74385
- Dialling codes: 07144
- Vehicle registration: LB
- Website: www.pleidelsheim.de

Pleidelsheim (German pronunciation: [ˈplaɪ̯dl̩sˌhaɪ̯m]; Alemannic German: Bleidelse) is a municipality in the state of Baden-Württemberg, about 30 km (19 mi) north of Stuttgart. Pleidelsheim is situated on the right bank of the Neckar river across from Ingersheim. This historical town has buildings that date back to the 14th century.

== Personality ==
=== Sons and daughters of the town ===
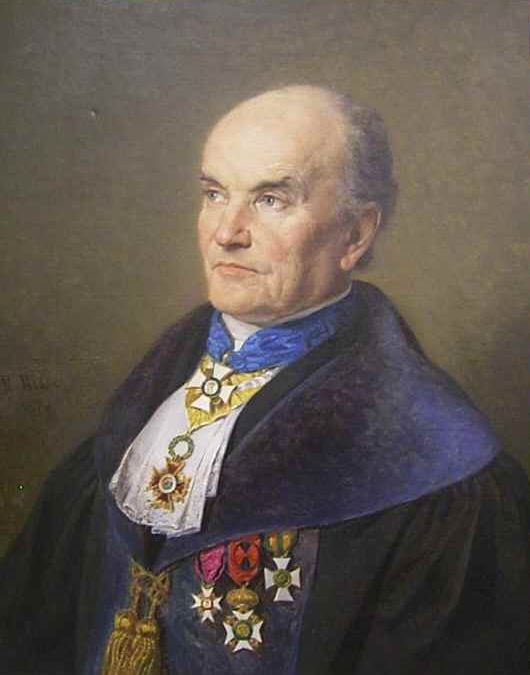
Adalbert Keller

- Johann David Wildermuth, (1807-1885, professor and high school teacher in Tübingen, husband of Ottilie Wildermuth
- Adelbert von Keller, (1812-1883), German scholar and linguist

=== Other personalities ===
- 1983 Arthur Boka, professional footballer of VfB Stuttgart, lived in Pleidelsheim.
