= Ludwigsburg (district) =

Coordinates: 48.9°N 9.2°E

- District
- Flag Coat of arms
- Country: Germany
- State: Baden-Württemberg
- Adm. region: Stuttgart
- Capital: Ludwigsburg

Government
  - District admin.: Dietmar Allgaier (CDU)

Area
  - Total: 687.17 km^{2} (265.32 sq mi)

Population (31 December 2022)
  - Total: 551,051
  - Density: 800/km^{2} (2,100/sq mi)
- Time zone: UTC+01:00 (CET)
  - Summer (DST): UTC+02:00 (CEST)
- Vehicle registration: LB and VAI
- Website: www.landkreis-ludwigsburg.de

Landkreis Ludwigsburg is a Landkreis (district) in the middle of Baden-Württemberg, Germany. Neighboring districts are (from north clockwise) Heilbronn, Rems-Murr-Kreis, the district-free city Stuttgart, and the districts Böblingen and Enz-Kreis.

== History ==
The district dates back to the Oberamt Ludwigsburg, which was created by the dukedom Württemberg in the beginning of the 19th century. After several small changes during the century, it was converted into a district in 1938. Several municipalities of the dissolved Oberämter Besigheim, Marbach and Waiblingen were added to the newly formed district.

As a result of the communal reform of 1973, the district gained about half of the dissolved district Vaihingen, and some few municipalities from the districts Backnang and Leonberg.

== Geography ==
The main river in the district is the Neckar, which divides the district into a big western part and a smaller eastern part.

== Partnerships ==
Starting in 1990 the district has a partnership with the district Chemnitzer Land (now part of the district of Zwickau) in Saxony. Even older is the partnership with the region Upper Galilee in Israel. Since 1992 the district has a partnership with the Hungarian Komitat Pest, however the official signing of the partnership contract took place in 2002. A friendship exists with the city Yichang in the province Hubei, China.

== Coat of arms ==
The imperial eagle in the coat of arms is taken from the arms of the city Markgröningen, which was an imperial city. It was later adopted by the city Ludwigsburg as well. The deer antler above the eagle is the symbol of Württemberg.

== Towns and municipalities ==
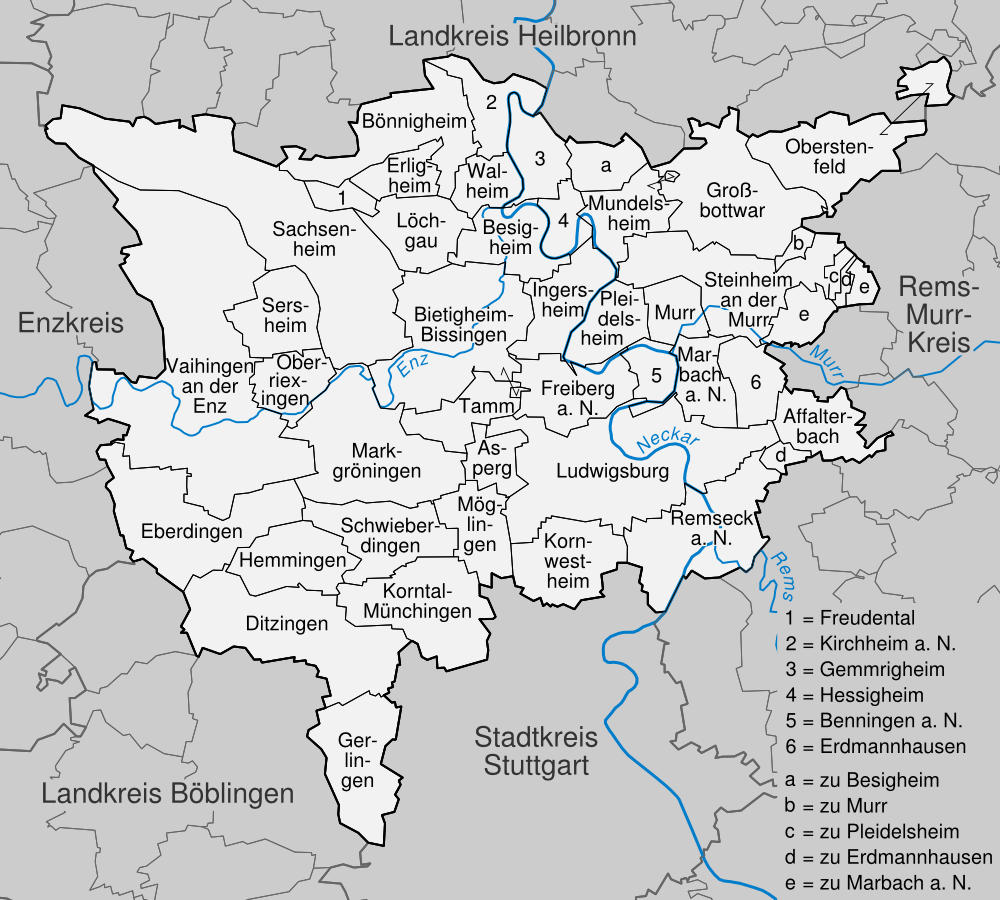
Clickable map of towns and municipalities in the district

Towns
1. Asperg
2. Besigheim
3. Bietigheim-Bissingen
4. Bönnigheim
5. Ditzingen
6. Freiberg am Neckar
7. Gerlingen
8. Großbottwar
9. Korntal-Münchingen
10. Kornwestheim
11. Ludwigsburg
12. Marbach am Neckar
13. Markgröningen
14. Oberriexingen
15. Remseck
16. Sachsenheim
17. Steinheim an der Murr
18. Tamm
19. Vaihingen (Enz)
Municipal federations
1. Besigheim
2. Bietigheim-Bissingen
3. Bönnigheim
4. Freiberg
5. Marbach am Neckar
6. Steinheim-Murr
7. Vaihingen
Municipalities
1. Affalterbach
2. Benningen
3. Eberdingen
4. Erdmannhausen
5. Erligheim
6. Freudental
7. Gemmrigheim
8. Hemmingen
9. Hessigheim
10. Ingersheim
11. Kirchheim am Neckar
12. Löchgau
13. Möglingen
14. Mundelsheim
15. Murr
16. Oberstenfeld
17. Pleidelsheim
18. Schwieberdingen
19. Sersheim
20. Walheim
