= Nordheim, Baden-Württemberg =

Nordheim
- Municipality
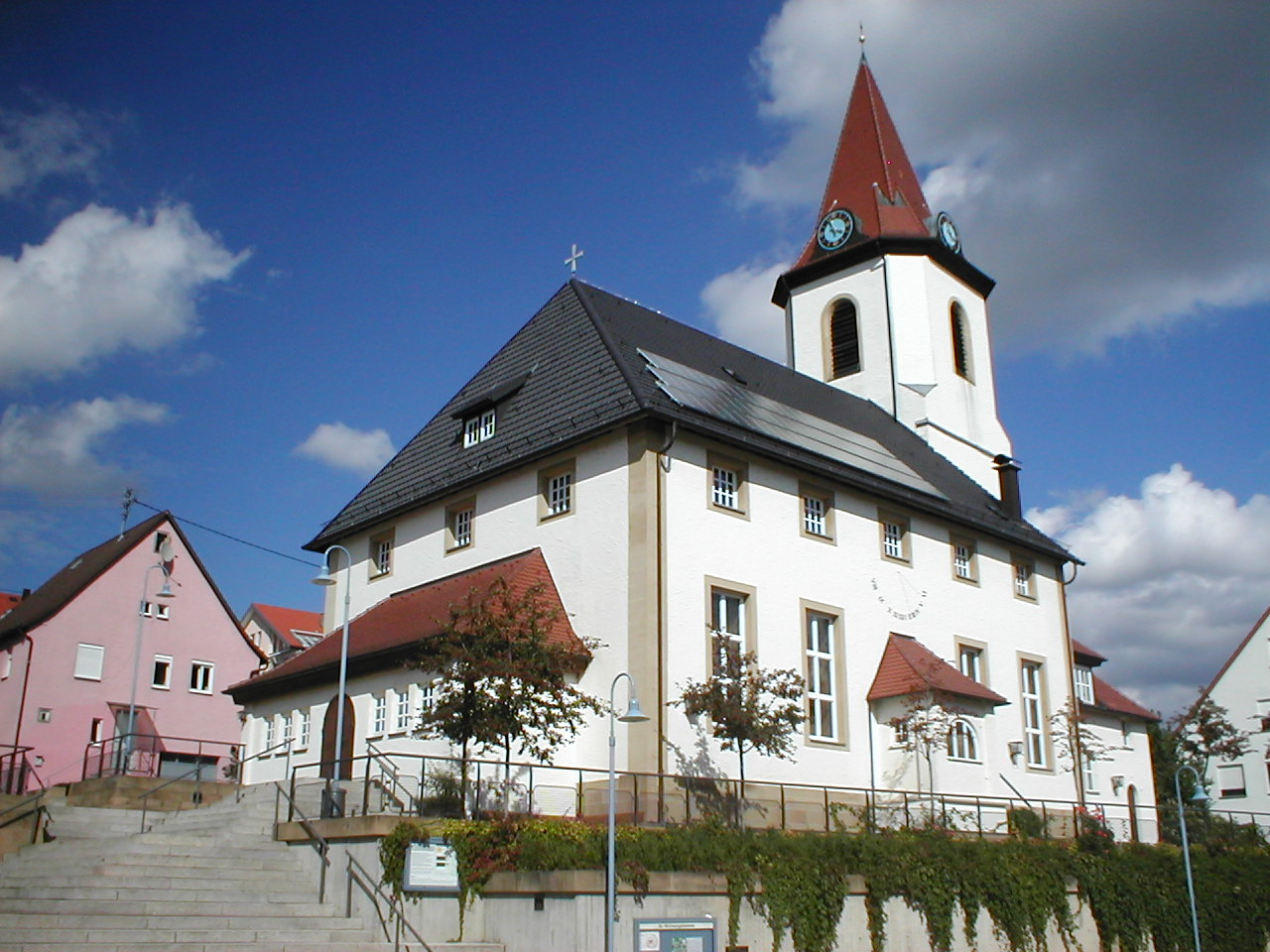
- Protestant Bartholomeus Church

- Coat of arms

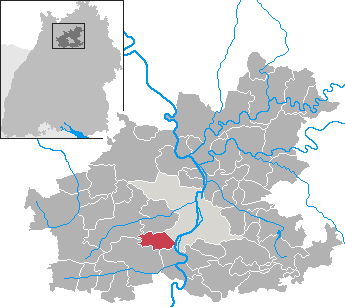
- Location of Nordheim within Heilbronn district
- Interactive map of Nordheim
- Location within Germany Location within Baden-Württemberg
- Coordinates: 49°7′N 9°8′E
- Country: Germany
- State: Baden-Württemberg
- Admin. region: Stuttgart
- District: Heilbronn
- Subdivisions: 2

Government
  - Mayor (2019–27): Volker Schiek

Area
  - Total: 12.71 km^{2} (4.91 sq mi)
- Elevation: 188 m (617 ft)

Population (2025-12-31)
  - Total: 8,531
  - Density: 671.2/km^{2} (1,738/sq mi)
- Time zone: UTC+01:00 (CET)
  - Summer (DST): UTC+02:00 (CEST)
- Postal codes: 74226
- Dialling codes: 07133 (Nordheim) und 07135 (Nordhausen)
- Vehicle registration: HN
- Website: www.nordheim.de

Nordheim (German pronunciation: [ˈnɔʁthaɪm]) is a town in the district of Heilbronn in Baden-Württemberg in Germany.

== Demographics ==
Population development:

Year	Inhabitants
1990	6.060
2001	7.308
2011	7.571
2021	8.407
