= Löchgau =

German municipality

- Municipality
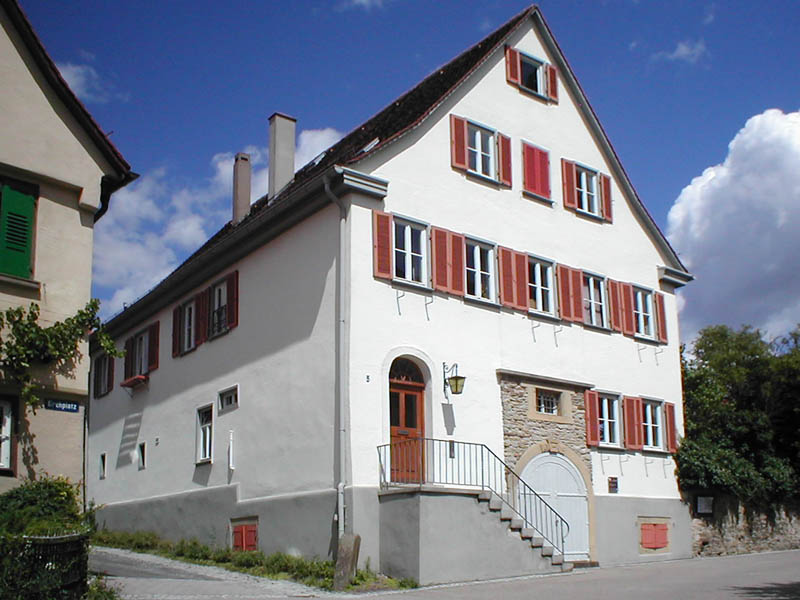
- Löchgau, July 2007

- Coat of arms

- Location of Löchgau within Ludwigsburg district
- Interactive map of Löchgau
- Location within Germany Location within Baden-Württemberg
- Coordinates: 49°0′6″N 9°6′30″E
- Country: Germany
- State: Baden-Württemberg
- Admin. region: Stuttgart
- District: Ludwigsburg

Area
  - Total: 10.95 km^{2} (4.23 sq mi)
- Elevation: 260 m (850 ft)

Population (2025-12-31)
  - Total: 5,837
  - Density: 533.1/km^{2} (1,381/sq mi)
- Time zone: UTC+01:00 (CET)
  - Summer (DST): UTC+02:00 (CEST)
- Postal codes: 74369
- Dialling codes: 07143
- Vehicle registration: LB
- Website: www.loechgau.de

Löchgau (German pronunciation: [ˈlœçˌɡaʊ̯]) is a municipality in the Ludwigsburg district of Baden-Württemberg, Germany.

== History ==
Löchgau was first mentioned in a document dated to between 1105 and 1120 as "Lochenheim". A noble family document as having been influential in the area since the early 12th century sold their share of the village to the Prince-Bishop of Speyer, who turned over the property to Maulbronn Monastery. The Margraviate of Baden made further donations of nearby property to Maulbronn in 1225, as did Rechentshofen Abbey in 1260. In 1416, fully half of Löchgau by the Venningen family to the Margrave of Baden, which was then pledged to the Electoral Palatinates in 1463, to the Duchy of Württemberg in 1504, and then to Baden again in 1529, and then finally and once again to Württemberg in 1595 along with Besigheim. Württemberg acquired the other half of the village from its various owners from 1407 to 1506. The village of Weißenhof was founded 2 kilometers (1.2 mi) south of Löchgau in 1739. In 1810, Löchgau was reassigned from the district of Bietigheim, which was dissolved, to Oberamt Besigheim. This district, too, was dissolved in 1938 and replaced with a new one, Landkreis Ludwigsburg. Löchgau doubled in size in the years after World War II.

== Geography ==
The municipality (Gemeinde) of Löchgau is located in the district of Ludwigsburg, in Baden-Württemberg, one of the 16 States of the Federal Republic of Germany. Löchgau is physically located in the basin of the Neckar. Elevation above sea level in the municipal area ranges from a high of 331 meters (1,086 ft) Normalnull (NN) to a low of 197 meters (646 ft) NN.

== Demographics ==
Population development:

Year	Inhabitants
1605	780
1816	1,321
1931	1,513
1950	2,221
1963	2,976
1970	3,925
1980	4,374
1990	4,938
2000	5,262
2010	5,384
2018	5,594

== Politics ==
Löchgau has one borough (Ortseil), Löchgau, and two villages: Petershöfe and Weißenhof. Löchgau is in a municipal association with Besigheim.

=== Coat of arms ===
Löchgau's coat of arms shows a large, yellow "L" next to a six-pointed star of the same color upon a field of blue. The "L" is a local motif that is documented as early as 1684. The star accompanying it first appeared in 1757. This coat of arms was designed based on the suggestions of the Central State Archive Stuttgart in 1921. A corresponding municipal flag was issued by the Ludwigsburg district office on 12 March 1980.

== Transportation ==
Löchgau is connected to Germany's network of roadways by its local Landesstraßen and Kreisstraßen. Local public transportation is provided by the Verkehrs- und Tarifverbund Stuttgart.
