= Mundelsheim =

- Municipality
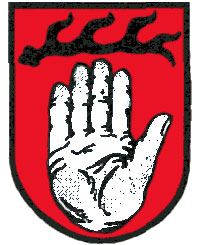
- Coat of arms

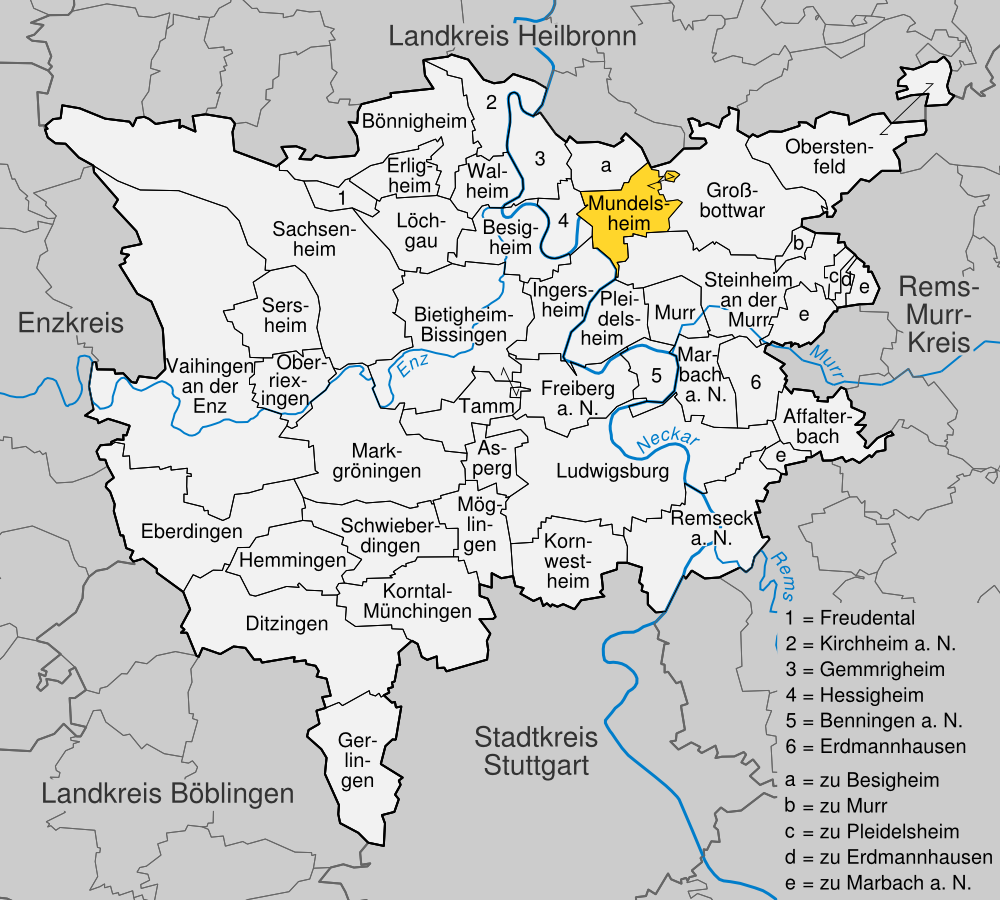
- Location of Mundelsheim within Ludwigsburg district
- Interactive map of Mundelsheim
- Location within Germany Location within Baden-Württemberg
- Coordinates: 49°0′0″N 9°12′23″E
- Country: Germany
- State: Baden-Württemberg
- Admin. region: Stuttgart
- District: Ludwigsburg

Government
  - Mayor (2018–26): Boris Seitz

Area
  - Total: 10.2 km^{2} (3.9 sq mi)
- Elevation: 195 m (640 ft)

Population (2025-12-31)
  - Total: 3,515
  - Density: 345/km^{2} (893/sq mi)
- Time zone: UTC+01:00 (CET)
  - Summer (DST): UTC+02:00 (CEST)
- Postal codes: 74395
- Dialling codes: 07143
- Vehicle registration: LB, VAI
- Website: mundelsheim.de

Mundelsheim (German pronunciation: [ˈmʊndl̩sˌhaɪ̯m]) is a municipality in the German state of Baden-Wuerttemberg. It is located in the Ludwigsburg district, about 30 km north of Stuttgart and 20 km south of Heilbronn, on the Neckar river. It belongs to the Stuttgart Metropolitan Region.

== History ==
Around the time of Christ's birth around the Neckar valley was populated by the Celts. With the Roman invasion, the area was incorporated into the Roman Empire. From the reign of the Roman remains of a Mithraic temple testify on the grounds of the industrial area Ottmarsheimer Höhe. This temple belonged to an extensive Roman settlement, which has been studied since the 1990s there at securing excavations of Antiquities and Monuments Office of the state Baden-Württemberg. A Roman villa has been discovered during the construction of the federal motorway 81.

In 500 AD, began the rule of the Alemanni was an Alemannic nobleman named Mundolf, who gave the place its present name: "Mundolfsheim" what was in the language changed over the centuries to "Mundelsheim". In 1245 the place "Mundelsheim" was first mentioned in records. After the disintegration of the Duchy of Swabia the community came into the possession of the Margrave of Baden. This gave him the 13th Century the Lords of Urbach fief. In 1422 Emperor Sigismund Mundelsheim awarded municipal law. The Lords of Urbach participated in many robberies on traveling merchants. Therefore, the imperial cities of Heilbronn and Schwäbisch Hall moved in 1440 before with an army of 600 men on horseback against Mundelsheim and destroyed the community.

1595 Mundelsheim was sold to the House of Württemberg. Until 1806 was Mundelsheim seat of an urban district that came up first in the rural district office Beilstein and then in the rural district office Marbach. When this was dissolved in 1938 in the course of municipal reform, the community fell to the rural district of Ludwigsburg, where it now belongs.

== Religion ==
While the Reformation had prevailed in the neighboring municipalities of Württemberg since 1534, the Baden districts such as Mundelsheim and Besigheim did not follow suit until much later. After the Peace of Augsburg in 1555, Margrave Karl II of Baden-Durlach implemented a uniform creed in his domain and introduced the Protestant faith in 1556. Today the Protestant parish of Mundelsheim belongs to the parish of Marbach.

There is also the Catholic parish of St. Wolfgang in Mundelsheim and a parish of the New Apostolic Church.

== Demographics ==
Population development:

Year	Inhabitants
1990	2,889
2001	3,152
2011	3,204
2021	3,460

== Coat of arms and flag ==
The municipal coat of arms shows a raised silver right hand in red under a lying black deer pole. The coat of arms was introduced after the transition to Württemberg and probably shows a hand raised to oath of subjects. The deer pole stands for belonging to Württemberg.

The municipal flag is white and red and was awarded on August 4, 1980.

== Culture and sights ==
=== Buildings ===
==== Nikolauskirche ====
Nikolauskirche was a chapel until 1602 and was expanded as a church at that time. In 1836 the tower was demolished and built with sandstone in the neoclassical style. A preciousness inside is the Weimer organ from 1784.

==== Kilianskirche ====
As early as 1247, Saint Kilian's church was mentioned in a papal document and belonged to the Oberstenfeld women's choir monastery. Badly damaged by an army from the free imperial cities of Heilbronn and Hall in 1440 and rebuilt in today's larger form, it houses worth seeing late Gothic frescoes from the years 1460 to 1470.

==== Grossbottwarer Tor ====
As a sign of the city gate granted in 1422, Mundelsheim was fortified by gates, walls and ditches. The only preserved gate is the Grossbottwarer Tor. It was part of the fortifications and at the same time the official residence of the "gatekeeper".

==== Hölderlin pharmacy ====
The house was built in 1747 by pastor Magister Johann Leonhard Hölderlin (uncle of the poet Friedrich Hölderlin). The two-storey plastered building has a hipped mansard roof in the Baroque style. A pharmacy has been operating here since 1832, which gave the building its name.

==== Municipal bakehouse ====
The older of the two remaining Municipal bakehouse was built in 1838 due to a ducal order for fire prevention. It is still used regularly as a bakehouse today.

=== Historical guided tour ===
The historical guided tour with 24 objects in the centre and other attractions in the outdoor area provides an insight into the history of the place. The tour begins on the market square in front of the community centre. There is an information board on which all the objects are listed. On the buildings and monuments are signs with brief explanations.

=== Museum in the tithe barn ===
The history society Geschichtsverein Mundelsheim has set up in the former tithe barn of the monastery Oberstenfeld a wine-growing exhibition. On display boards and display cases the visitors are explained the historical background. As additional stations, a cooper workshop and a wagon-maker workshop are set up.

== Economy and Infrastructure ==
The economy of Mundelsheim, like that of the whole region, is characterized by wine and fruit growing. A very well-known wine location is the Mundelsheimer "Käsberg". Like the other locations "Mühlbächer" and "Rozenberg", it belongs to the large Schalkstein location in the Württemberg Lowlands (Württembergisch Unterland) in the wine-growing region of Württemberg.

=== Traffic ===
Mundelsheim is connected to the rail traffic via bus connections to Besigheim and Freiberg. Besigheim has a train station on the Franconia Railway (Stuttgart – Würzburg). Freiberg is served by the S4 line (Backnang – Marbach – Stuttgart) of the Stuttgart S-Bahn.

Mundelsheim is located directly on the A 81 Heilbronn – Stuttgart motorway with its own motorway exit.

Mundelsheim can also be reached by ship. The Neckar-Personenschifffahrt maintains a landing stage directly on the Neckar Valley Cycle Path.

=== Newspaper ===
Mundelsheim Aktuell, the newsletter and public notice organ of the municipality, appears once a week on Fridays. The Bietigheimer Zeitung, the Ludwigsburger Kreiszeitung, the Neckar- und Enzbote, the Marbacher Zeitung and the Stuttgarter Zeitung regularly report on current events in Mundelsheim.

=== Public and social institutions ===
==== Kindergartens ====
There are three kindergartens in Mundelsheim: the two community kindergartens "Seelhofen" and "Dammweg" as well as a Protestant kindergarten.

==== Local library ====
The local library is in the old school. Children's and young people's books, adult literature, informative non-fiction books, travel guides and books on the topics of education, health, pets, gardening, handicrafts, cooking and baking are available for readers. Audiobooks, CDs and games can also be borrowed.

==== Open-air bath ====
The swimming pool, which is open in the summer months from the beginning of May to mid-September, is located on the Neckar river. The advantages of the small pool are the crystal clear and mineral-rich water with pleasant temperatures and an interestingly designed children's play area. It is possible to play beach volleyball, table football and table tennis. There is a kiosk in the entrance area. Parking spaces are in the immediate vicinity.

==== Urban retirement home ====
Mundelsheim has a care facility in the form of the urban retirement home of the Alexander Stift. It combines inpatient care places and short-term care places under one roof. There are also assisted senior citizens' apartments.

==== On-site helpers ====
Since May 2016, the Mundelsheim volunteer fire brigade has also been an on-site medical emergency unit. Their task is to provide care to emergency patients as quickly as possible before the ambulance service arrives.

==== Church institutions ====
The Protestant Nikolauskirche is located in Schulgasse, as is the parish office. The YMCA house in Kappelstrasse serves as the community center. The Protestant Kilianskirche is located in the cemetery on the corner of Kirchhofgasse and Kilianstrasse.

The Catholic Church of St. Wolfgang with the community center is located in Amselweg.

The New Apostolic Church is in Fischerwert street.

=== Education ===
The Georg Hager School was a primary and secondary school until the end of the 2014/15 school year. After the elimination of the secondary school, the Georg Hager School is now a voluntary all-day elementary school. Secondary schools can e.g. in Besigheim, Freiberg or Marbach can be visited.

=== Tourism ===
There are numerous hiking trails in Mundelsheim, including the Käsbergweg with a view of the famous Neckar river loop as well as five wine and fruit hiking trails, six forest hiking trails and a water hiking trail.

Mundelsheim is located on the Neckar Valley Cycle Path, which runs from Villingen-Schwenningen via Horb, Tübingen, Stuttgart, Heilbronn and Heidelberg to Mannheim for around 410 km along the Neckar river.

== People ==
- Johann Wolff (1537–1600) was a German jurist who corresponded with Lelio Sozzini on the sacrament 1555. He was also a diplomat, translator, historian and theologian.
- Namosh (* 1981) is a German singer, musician, performance artist, actor and DJ of Kurdish descent.
