= Hessigheim =

German municipality

- Municipality
- Coat of arms

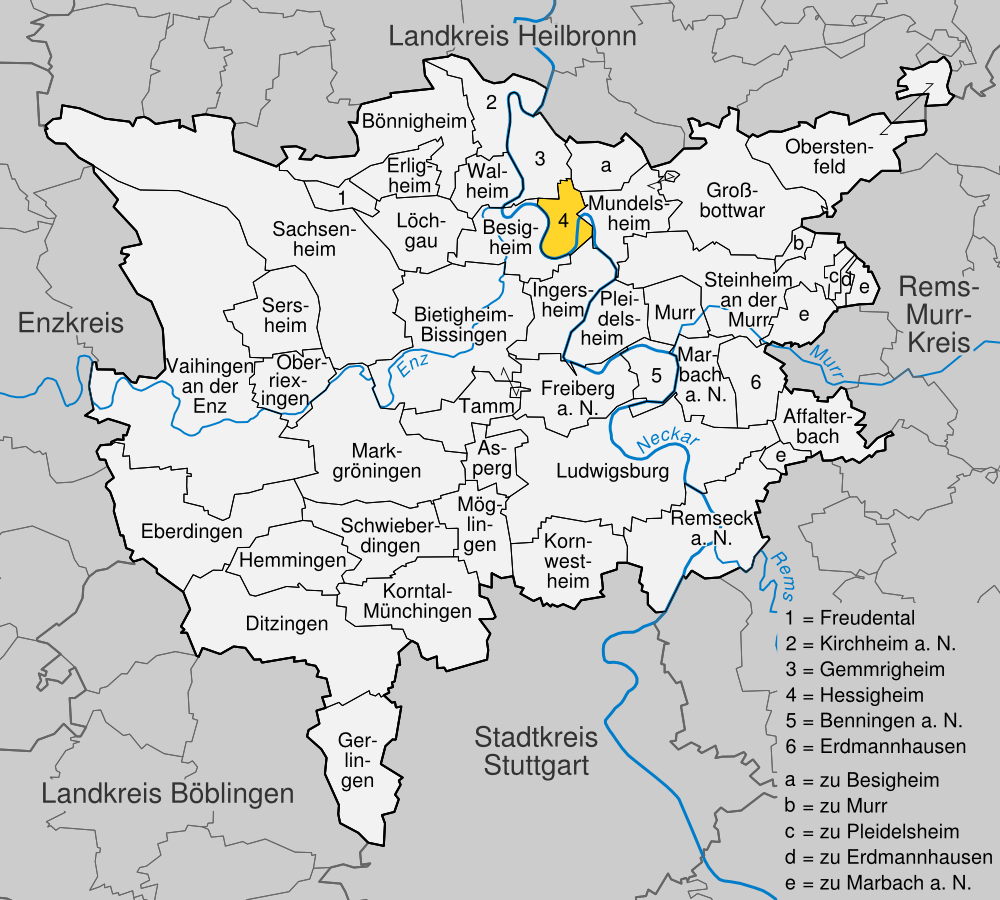
- Location of Hessigheim within Ludwigsburg district
- Interactive map of Hessigheim
- Location within Germany Location within Baden-Württemberg
- Coordinates: 48°59′43″N 9°11′17″E
- Country: Germany
- State: Baden-Württemberg
- Admin. region: Stuttgart
- District: Ludwigsburg

Government
  - Mayor (2018–26): Günther Pilz

Area
  - Total: 5.03 km^{2} (1.94 sq mi)
- Elevation: 189 m (620 ft)

Population (2025-12-31)
  - Total: 2,514
  - Density: 500/km^{2} (1,290/sq mi)
- Time zone: UTC+01:00 (CET)
  - Summer (DST): UTC+02:00 (CEST)
- Postal codes: 74394
- Dialling codes: 07143
- Vehicle registration: LB
- Website: www.hessigheim.de

Hessigheim (German pronunciation: [ˈhɛsɪkˌhaɪ̯m]; Swabian: Hesge) is a municipality in the Ludwigsburg district of Baden-Württemberg, Germany.

== History ==
Hessigheim was first mentioned in 744 as a property of first Lorsch Abbey to Princely Abbey of Fulda. The town was pledged to the Electoral Palatinate in 1453, but was then militarily occupied in 1504 by the Duchy of Württemberg.

== Geography ==
The municipality (Gemeinde) of Hessigheim is located in the district of Ludwigsburg, in Baden-Württemberg, one of the 16 States of the Federal Republic of Germany. Hessigheim is physically located in the basin of the Neckar. Elevation above sea level in the municipal area ranges from a high of 306 meters (1,004 ft) Normalnull (NN) to a low of 173 meters (568 ft) NN.

Portions of the Federally protected Hessigheim rock garden and Neckarhalde nature reserves are located in Hessigheim's municipal area.

== Politics ==
Hessigheim has one borough (Ortsteil), Hessigheim, and two villages: Fasanenhof and Im Fetzer.

=== Coat of arms ===
Hessigheim's coat of arms shows a green grapevine with three clusters of blue grapes growing upon a hill split by a wavy white line, all upon a field of white. This coat of arms was awarded to Hessigheim with a municipal flag on 18 July 1979.

== Transportation ==
Hessigheim is connected to Germany's network of roadways by its local Landesstraßen and Kreisstraßen. Local public transportation is provided by the Verkehrs- und Tarifverbund Stuttgart.
