= Gemmrigheim =

German municipality

- Municipality
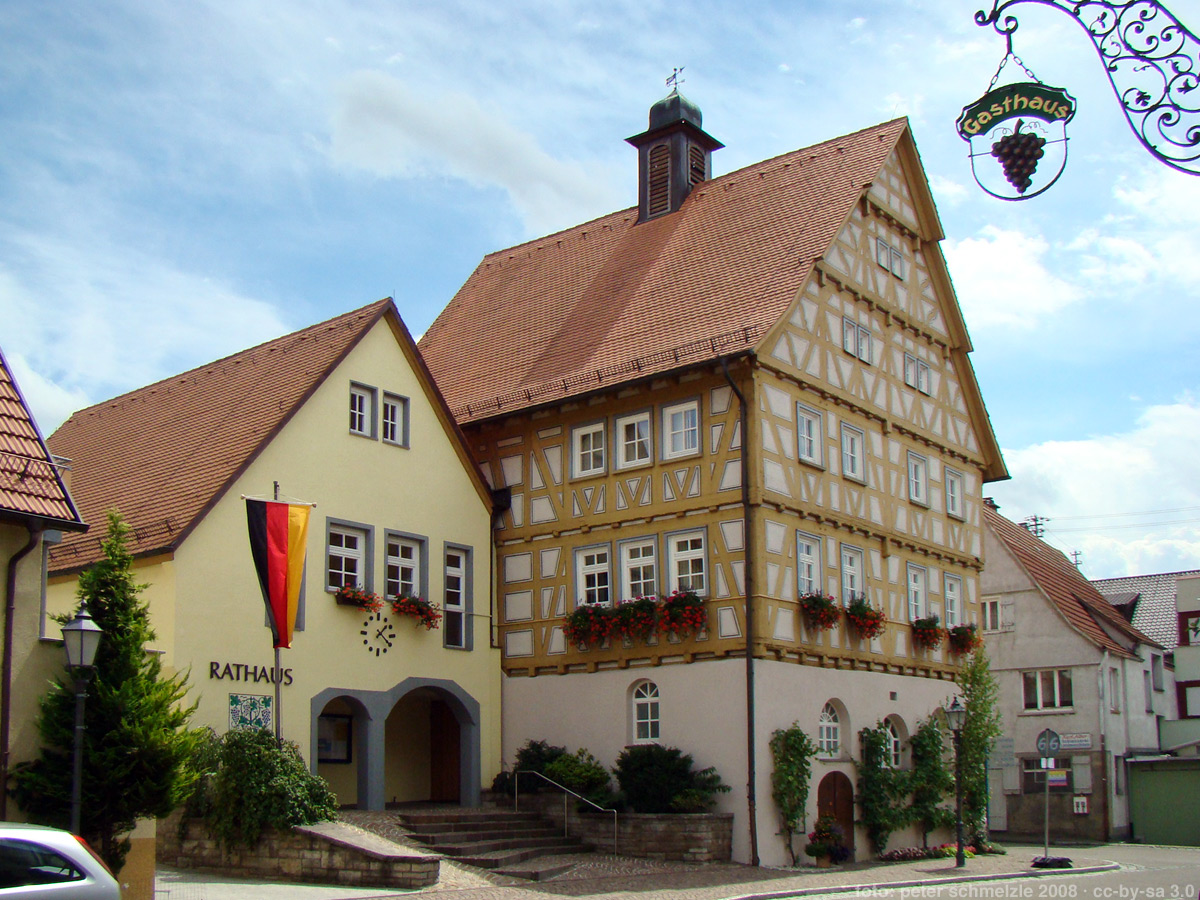
- Town hall, Gemmrigheim

- Coat of arms

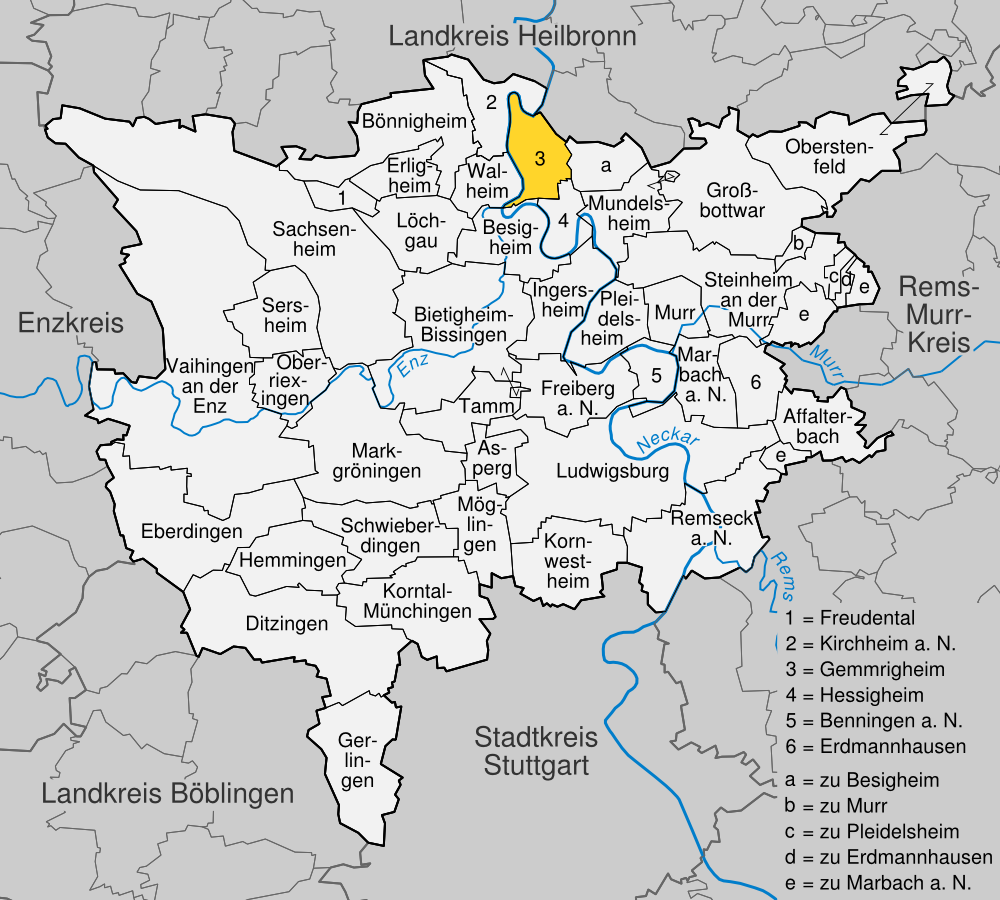
- Location of Gemmrigheim within Ludwigsburg district
- Interactive map of Gemmrigheim
- Location within Germany Location within Baden-Württemberg
- Coordinates: 49°1′31″N 9°9′27″E
- Country: Germany
- State: Baden-Württemberg
- Admin. region: Stuttgart
- District: Ludwigsburg

Area
  - Total: 8.23 km^{2} (3.18 sq mi)
- Elevation: 182 m (597 ft)

Population (2025-12-31)
  - Total: 4,597
  - Density: 559/km^{2} (1,450/sq mi)
- Time zone: UTC+01:00 (CET)
  - Summer (DST): UTC+02:00 (CEST)
- Postal codes: 74376
- Dialling codes: 07143
- Vehicle registration: LB
- Website: www.gemmrigheim.de

Gemmrigheim (German pronunciation: [ˈɡɛmʁɪkˌhaɪ̯m]) is municipality in the district of Ludwigsburg, in Baden-Württemberg, Germany.

== History ==
Gemmrigheim was first mentioned in historical documentation in 1085 as a possession of the County of Calw, though the village was probably established in the 5th or 6th centuries AD. The Reichenbach Priory, of Hirsau Abbey was established at Gemmrigheim around 1100.

== Geography ==
The municipality (Gemeinde) of Gemmrigheim is located at the northern edge of the district of Ludwigsburg, in the German state of Baden-Württemberg, along the border with the district of Heilbronn. Gemmrigheim lies along the Neckar, firmly placing it in Neckar river basin. Elevation above sea level in the municipal area ranges from a high of 278 meters (912 ft) Normalnull (NN) to a low of 167 meters (548 ft) NN.

== Politics ==
Gemmrigheim has one borough (Ortsteile), Gemmrigheim, and five villages: Heinzenberg, Liebensteiner Weg, Pumpwerk, Vogelsang, and Wasen.

=== Coat of arms ===
Gemmrigheim's coat of arms displays a green grapevine with five clusters of blue grapes growing on a black pole stuck into a green, three-pointed hill, upon a field of white. Local heraldry and seals have made reference to the practice of viticulture since 1525, usually with five clumps of grapes. This coat of arms was devised in 1924 and was accompanied by a municipal flag issued by the Ludwigsburg district office on 20 February 1980.

== Transportation ==
Gemmrigheim is connected to Germany's network of roadways by its local Landesstraßen and Kreisstraßen. Local public transportation is provided by the Verband Region Stuttgart.
