= Kirchheim am Neckar =

- Municipality
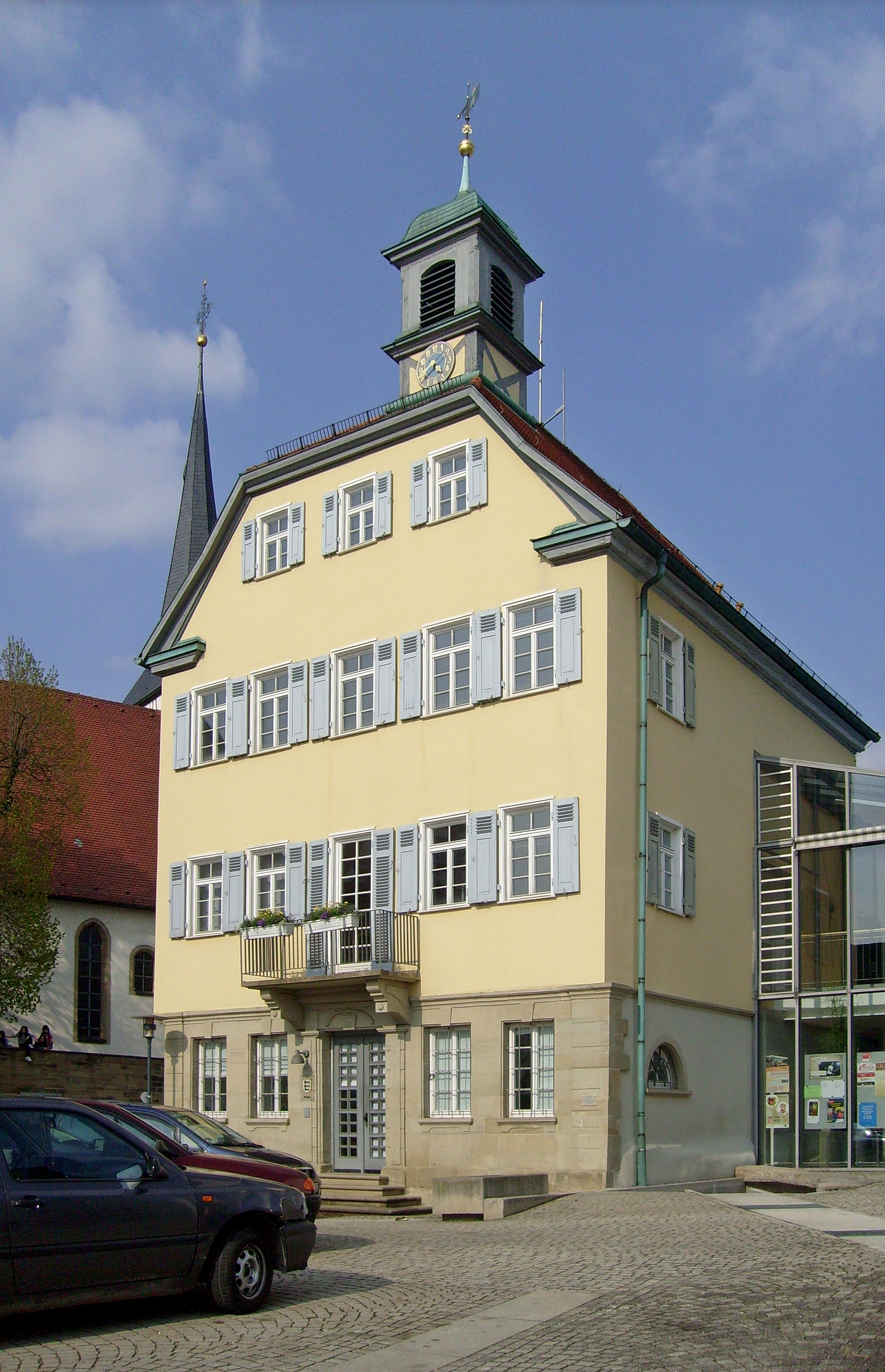
- Kirchheim am Neckar town hall

- Coat of arms

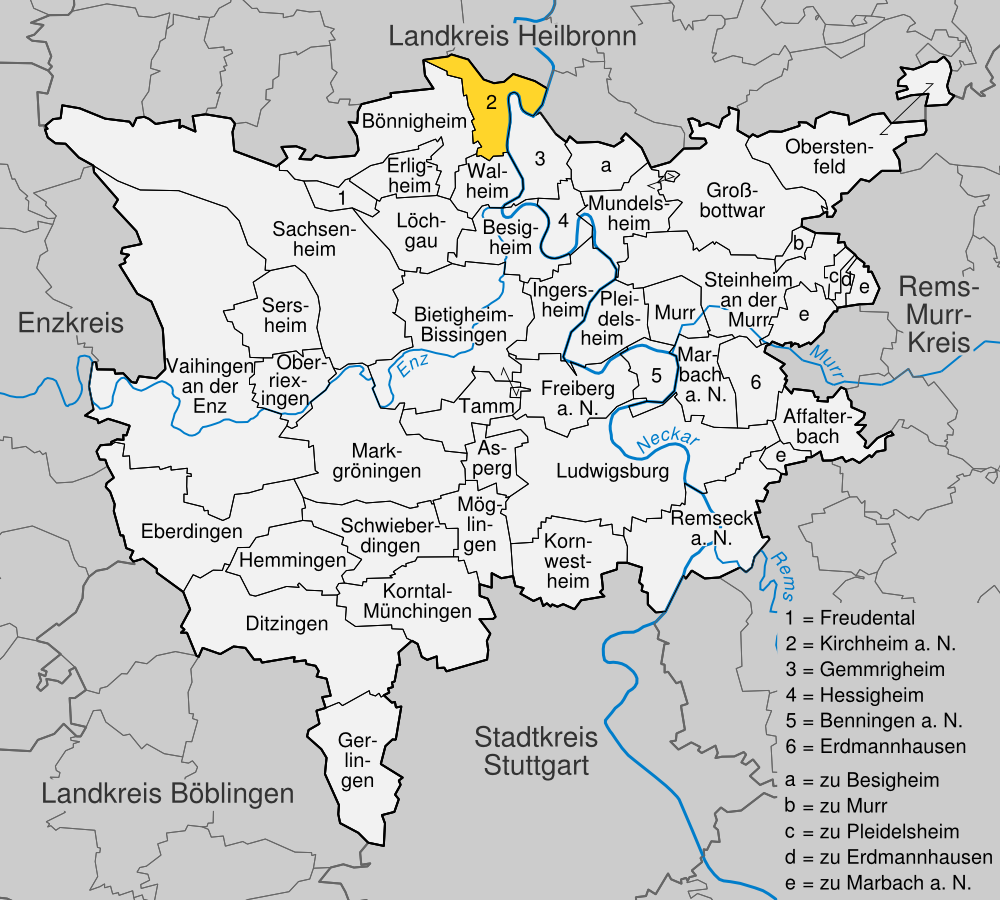
- Location of Kirchheim am Neckar within Ludwigsburg district
- Interactive map of Kirchheim am Neckar
- Location within Germany Location within Baden-Württemberg
- Coordinates: 49°02′38″N 09°08′47″E
- Country: Germany
- State: Baden-Württemberg
- Admin. region: Stuttgart
- District: Ludwigsburg

Government
  - Mayor (2023–31): Uwe Seibold

Area
  - Total: 8.52 km^{2} (3.29 sq mi)
- Elevation: 178 m (584 ft)

Population (2025-12-31)
  - Total: 6,031
  - Density: 708/km^{2} (1,830/sq mi)
- Time zone: UTC+01:00 (CET)
  - Summer (DST): UTC+02:00 (CEST)
- Postal codes: 74366
- Dialling codes: 07143
- Vehicle registration: LB
- Website: www.kirchheim-am-neckar.de

Kirchheim am Neckar (German pronunciation: [ˈkɪʁçhaɪ̯m ʔam ˈnɛkaʁ], lit. 'Kirchheim on the Neckar') is a municipality in the district of Ludwigsburg in Baden-Württemberg in Germany.

== Demographics ==
Population development:

Year	Inhabitants
1950	3,100
1960	3,659
1970	4,300
1980	4,300
1990	4,354
2000	5,188
2010	5,159
2020	6,084
