= Bietigheim-Bissingen (electoral district) =

State electoral district of Germany

14: Bietgheim-Bissingen
- Electoral district for the Landtag of Baden-Württemberg
- Bietgheim-Bissingen in 2026
- District: Ludwigsburg
- Electorate: 126,659 (2026)
- Major settlements: Affalterbach, Benningen am Neckar, Besigheim, Bietigheim-Bissingen, Erdmannhausen, Erligheim, Freiberg am Neckar, Freudental, Gemmrigheim, Großbottwar, Hessigheim, Ingersheim, Kirchheim am Neckar, Löchgau, Marbach am Neckar, Mundelsheim, Murr, Oberstenfeld, Pleidelsheim, Steinheim an der Murr, and Walheim

Current electoral district
- Party: CDU
- Member: Tobias Vogt

Bietgheim-Bissingen is an electoral constituency (German: Wahlkreis) represented in the Landtag of Baden-Württemberg. Since 2026, it has elected one member via first-past-the-post voting. Voters cast a second vote under which additional seats are allocated proportionally state-wide. Under the constituency numbering system, it is designated as constituency 14. It is wholly within the district of Ludwigsburg.

== Geography ==
The constituency includes the municipalities of Affalterbach, Benningen am Neckar, Besigheim, Bietigheim-Bissingen, Erdmannhausen, Erligheim, Freiberg am Neckar, Freudental, Gemmrigheim, Großbottwar, Hessigheim, Ingersheim, Kirchheim am Neckar, Löchgau, Marbach am Neckar, Mundelsheim, Murr, Oberstenfeld, Pleidelsheim, Steinheim an der Murr, and Walheim, within the district of Ludwigsburg.

There were 126,659 eligible voters in 2026.

== Members ==
=== First mandate ===
Both prior to and since the electoral reforms for the 2026 election, the winner of the plurality of the vote (first-past-the-post) in every constituency won the first mandate.

| Election | Member | Party | % |
|---|---|---|---|
| 1976 | Lothar Späth | CDU | |
| 1980 | Lothar Späth | CDU | |
| 1984 | Lothar Späth | CDU | |
| 1988 | Lothar Späth | CDU | |
| Aug 1991 | Manfred List | CDU | |
| 1992 | Manfred List | CDU | |
| 1996 | Manfred List | CDU | |
| 2001 | Annette Schavan | CDU | |
| Oct 2005 | Manfred Hollenbach | CDU | |
| 2006 | Manfred Hollenbach | CDU | 41.5 |
| 2011 | Manfred Hollenbach | CDU | 38.2 |
| 2016 | Daniel Renkonen | Grüne | 32.1 |
| 2021 | Tayfun Tok | Grüne | 34.2 |
| 2026 | Tobias Vogt | CDU | 37.5 |

=== Second mandate ===
Prior to the electoral reforms for the 2026 election, the seats in the state parliament were allocated proportionately amongst parties which received more than 5% of valid votes across the state. The seats that were won proportionally for parties that did not win as many first mandates as seats they were entitled to, were allocated to their candidates which received the highest proportion of the vote in their respective constituencies. This meant that following some elections, a constituency would have one or more members elected under a second mandate.

Prior to 2011, these second mandates were allocated to the party candidates who got the greatest number of votes, whilst from 2011-2021, these were allocated according to percentage share of the vote.

| Election | Member | Party | Member | Party | Member | Party |
|---|---|---|---|---|---|---|
| 1976 | Claus Weyrosta | SPD | | | | |
| 1980 | Claus Weyrosta | SPD | Wolfgang Weng | FDP | | |
| Apr 1983 | Claus Weyrosta | SPD | Doris Natusch | FDP | | |
| 1984 | Claus Weyrosta | SPD | | | Waltraud Ulshöfer-Eckstein | Grüne |
| 1988 | Claus Weyrosta | SPD | | | Michael Jacobi | Grüne |
| 1992 | Claus Weyrosta | SPD | Rolf Schlierer | REP | Michael Jacobi | Grüne |
| 1996 | Harald B. Schäfer | SPD | Rolf Schlierer | REP | Michael Jacobi | Grüne |
| Jun 1996 | Christine Rudolf | SPD | Rolf Schlierer | REP | Michael Jacobi | Grüne |
| 2001 | Christine Rudolf | SPD | | | Heike Dederer | Grüne |
| Jan 2005 | Christine Rudolf | SPD | | | Heike Dederer | CDU |
| 2006 | Christine Rudolf | SPD | Monika Chef | FDP | Franz Untersteller | Grüne |
| 2011 | Thomas Reusch-Frey | SPD | | | Daniel Renkonen | Grüne |
| 2016 | Fabian Gramling | CDU | | | | |
| 2021 | Tobias Vogt | CDU | | | | |

== Election results ==
=== 2026 election ===
State election (2026): Bietigheim-Bissingen
| Notes: | Blue background denotes the winner of the electorate vote. Pink background denotes a candidate elected from their party list. Yellow background denotes an electorate win by a list member, or other incumbent. A ✓ or ✗ denotes status of any incumbent, win or lose respectively. | | | | | | |
| Party | Candidate | Votes | % | ±% | Party votes | % | ±% |
|---|---|---|---|---|---|---|---|
| CDU | Tobias Vogt | 34,339 | 37.5 | ▲13.0 | 28,909 | 31.5 | ▲7.0 |
| Greens | ✗ Tayfun Tok | 24,690 | 27.0 | ▼7.2 | 27,757 | 30.2 | ▼4.0 |
| AfD | Reno Geisler | 16,509 | 18.0 | ▲8.8 | 16,609 | 18.1 | ▲8.9 |
| SPD | Daniel Haas | 6,640 | 7.3 | ▼3.3 | 4,943 | 5.4 | ▼5.2 |
| Left | Ingrid Petri | 4,072 | 4.5 | ▲1.7 | 3,369 | 3.7 | ▲0.9 |
| FDP | Paul Wien | 3,478 | 3.8 | ▼7.1 | 3,906 | 4.3 | ▼6.6 |
| FW | | | | | 1,855 | 2.0 | ▼0.6 |
| BSW | | | | | 1,161 | 1.3 | |
| APT | | | | | 788 | 0.9 | |
| Volt | Cal Engelhardt | 1,066 | 1.2 | ▲0.6 | 701 | 0.8 | ▼0.2 |
| PARTEI | | | | | 356 | 0.4 | ▼1.1 |
| dieBasis | | | | | 330 | 0.4 | ▼0.6 |
| Bündnis C | | | | | 202 | 0.2 | |
| ÖDP | Gerd Bogisch | 676 | 0.7 | ▲0.1 | 182 | 0.2 | ▼0.4 |
| Values | | | | | 179 | 0.2 | |
| Pensioners | | | | | 178 | 0.2 | |
| Team Todenhöfer | | | | | 142 | 0.2 | |
| Verjüngungsforschung | | | | | 62 | 0.1 | |
| PdF | | | | | 52 | 0.1 | |
| KlimalisteBW | | | | | 43 | 0.0 | ▼0.4 |
| Humanists | | | | | 38 | 0.0 | |
| Informal votes | | 794 | | | 502 | | |
| Total valid votes | | 91,470 | | | 91,762 | | |
| Turnout | | 92,264 | 72.8 | ▲6.2 | | | |
| CDU gain from Greens | Majority | 9,649 | 10.5 | | | | |

=== 2021 election ===
State election (2026): Bietigheim-Bissingen
| Party | Candidate | Votes | % | ±% |
|---|---|---|---|---|
| Greens | Tayfun Tok | 28,326 | 34.2 | ▲2.1 |
| CDU | Tobias Vogt | 20,267 | 24.5 | ▼1.2 |
| FDP | Elvira Nägele | 9,020 | 10.9 | ▲1.7 |
| SPD | Daniel Haas | 8,736 | 10.6 | ▼2.4 |
| AfD | Nikolas Boutakolou | 7,648 | 9.2 | ▼5.8 |
| Left | Walter Kubach | 2,296 | 2.8 | ▲0.5 |
| FW | Sylvia Rolke | 2,206 | 2.7 | |
| PARTEI | Dennis Rickert | 1,254 | 1.5 | ▲0.5 |
| dieBasis | Ulrich Kappl | 819 | 1.0 | |
| ÖDP | Guido Eink | 505 | 0.6 | |
| WiR2020 | Sven Ackert | 523 | 0.6 | |
| Volt | Hanna Antony | 462 | 0.6 | |
| KlimalisteBW | Nora Oehmichen | 408 | 0.5 | |
| DiB | Wolfgang Schaible | 274 | 0.3 | |
| Majority | | 8,059 | 9.7 | |
| Rejected ballots | | 451 | 0.5 | ▼0.3 |
| Turnout | | 83,195 | 66.6 | ▼7.9 |
| Registered electors | | 124,862 | | |
| Greens hold | | Swing | | |

== See also ==
- Politics of Baden-Württemberg
- Landtag of Baden-Württemberg
