= Karl Traub =

German politician (1941–2021)

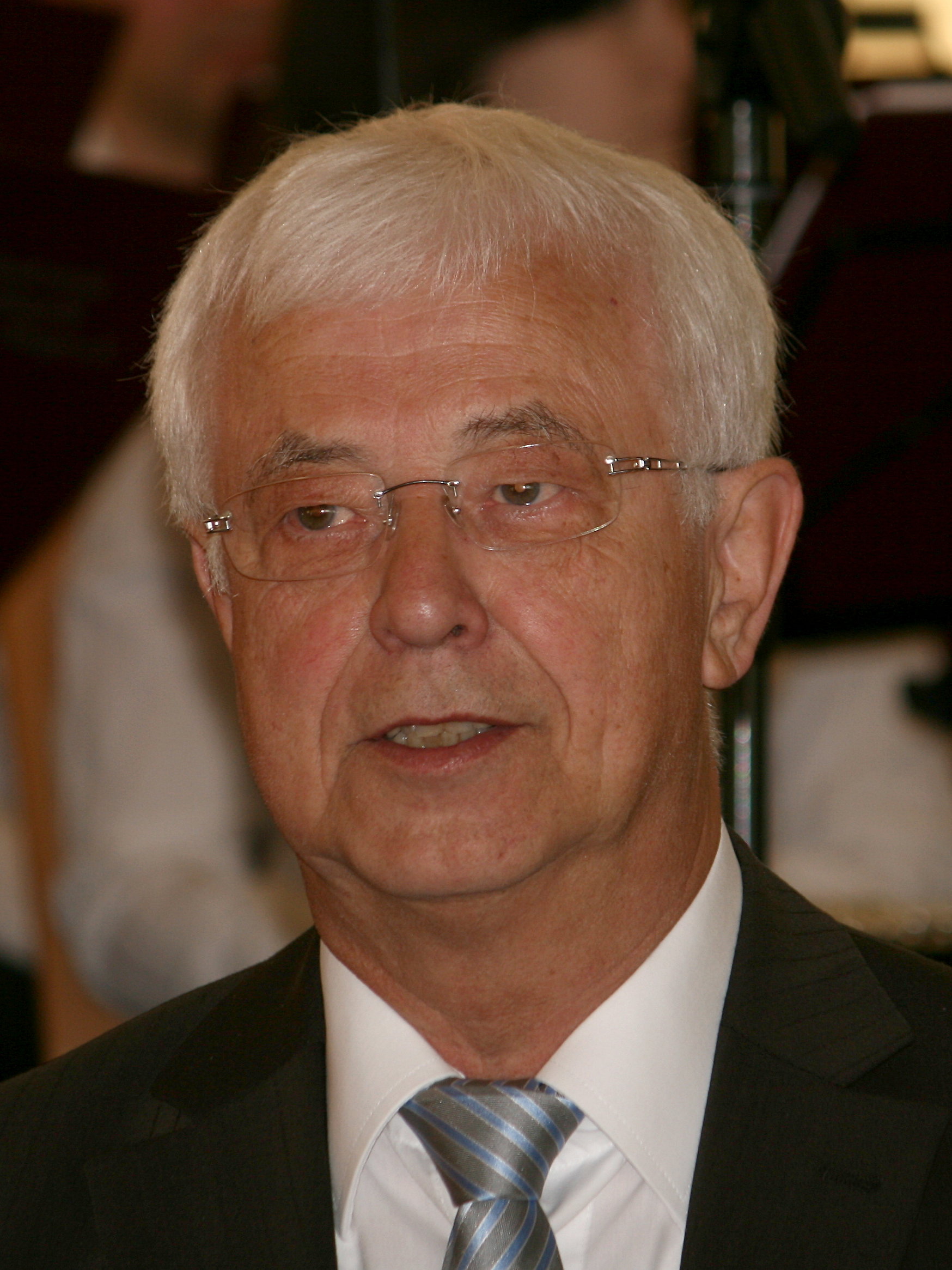
- Traub in 2009
- Born: 9 August 1941; Hausen am Bussen, Germany
- Died: 22 August 2021 (aged 80)
- Political party: Christian Democratic Union of Germany

Karl Traub (9 August 1941 – 22 August 2021) was a German politician for the Christian Democratic Union of Germany (CDU) From 1996 to 2016, he was a member of the Landtag of Baden-Württemberg, the state parliament of Baden-Württemberg.

== Biography ==
Traub was born in 1941 in the village of Hausen am Bussen and was trained as a farmer.

From 1996 to 2016 Traub was a member of the Landtag of Baden-Württemberg. He also served as the mayor of his home town from 1966 to 2009.
