= 1972 Baden-Württemberg state election =

State election in Germany

- 23 April 1972

All 120 seats in the Landtag of Baden-Württemberg 61 seats needed for a majority
- Turnout: 4,798,775 (80.00%) ▲9.25%
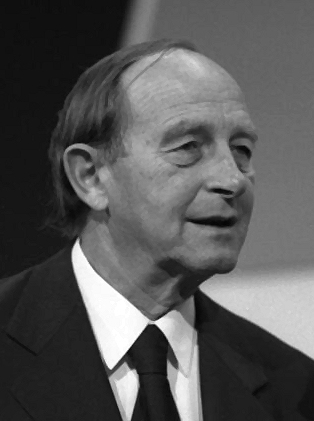

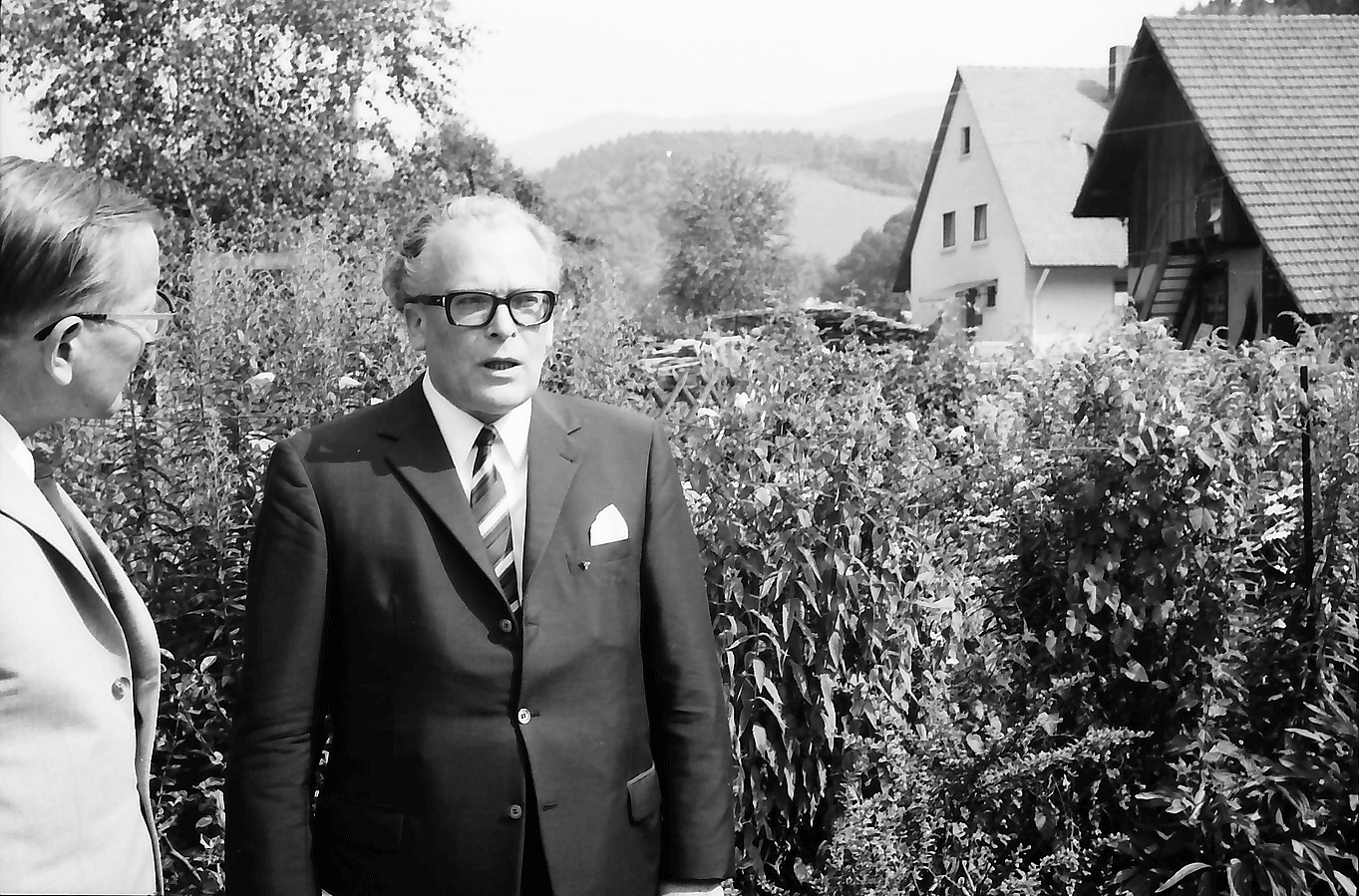
	First party	Second party	Third party
Leader	Hans Filbinger	Walter Krause	Johann Peter Brandenburg
Party	CDU	SPD	FDP
Last election	60 seats, 44.23%	37 seats, 28.95%	18 seats, 14.42%
Seats won	65	45	10
Seat change	▲5	▲8	▼8
Popular vote	2,513,808	1,784,416	424,685
Percentage	52.92%	37.56%	8.94%
Swing	▲8.69%	▲8.61%	▼5.48%
- Results for the single-member constituencies
Minister-President before election
Hans Filbinger
CDU
Elected Minister-President
Hans Filbinger
CDU

The 1972 Baden-Württemberg state election was held on 23 April 1972 to elect the members of the 5th Landtag of Baden-Württemberg. The incumbent Christian Democratic Union (CDU) government under Minister-President Hans Filbinger was re-elected, this time gaining a majority in the Landtag.

== History ==
After the 1968 Baden-Württemberg state election, the Christian Democratic Union and Social Democratic Party had formed a grand coalition. The neo-Nazi National Democratic Party of Germany, which had been relatively successful in the 1968 election, receiving almost ten percent of the vote and twelve seats, chose not to participate in the 1972 election. Instead, they called on their supporters to vote for the Christian Democratic Union.

The Christian Democratic Union was subsequently elected to a majority, the first time any party had ever won a majority in the Landtag of Baden-Württemberg.

== Parties ==
The table below lists parties represented in the previous Landtag of Baden-Württemberg and which chose to contest the 1972 election.

Name		Ideology	Leader(s)	1968 result	
Name		Ideology	Leader(s)	Votes (%)	Seats
CDU	Christian Democratic Union of Germany; Christlich Demokratische Union Deutschlands	Christian democracy	Hans Filbinger	44.23%	60 / 127
SPD	Social Democratic Party of Germany; Sozialdemokratische Partei Deutschlands	Social democracy	Walter Krause	28.95%	37 / 127
FDP	Free Democratic Party; Freie Demokratische Partei	Classical liberalism	Johann Peter Brandenburg	14.42%	18 / 127

== Results ==
Summary of the 23 April 1972 election results for the Landtag of Baden-Württemberg
Party	Votes	%	+/-	Seats	+/-	Seats %
Christian Democratic Union (CDU)	2,513,808	52.92	▲8.69	65	▲5	54.17%
Social Democratic Party (SPD)	1,784,416	37.56	▲8.61	45	▲8	37.50%
Free Democratic Party (FDP)	424,685	8.94	▼5.48	10	▼8	8.33%
German Communist Party (DKP)	21,973	0.46	New	0	±0	0
German Peace Union	587	0.01	New	0	±0	0
Justice Party	172	0.00	New	0	±0	0
Total	4,750,637	99.00		120	▼7	
Invalid votes	48,138	1.00				
Voter turnout	4,798,775	80.00	▲9.25			
