= Murr, Baden-Württemberg =

Murr
- Municipality
- Coat of arms

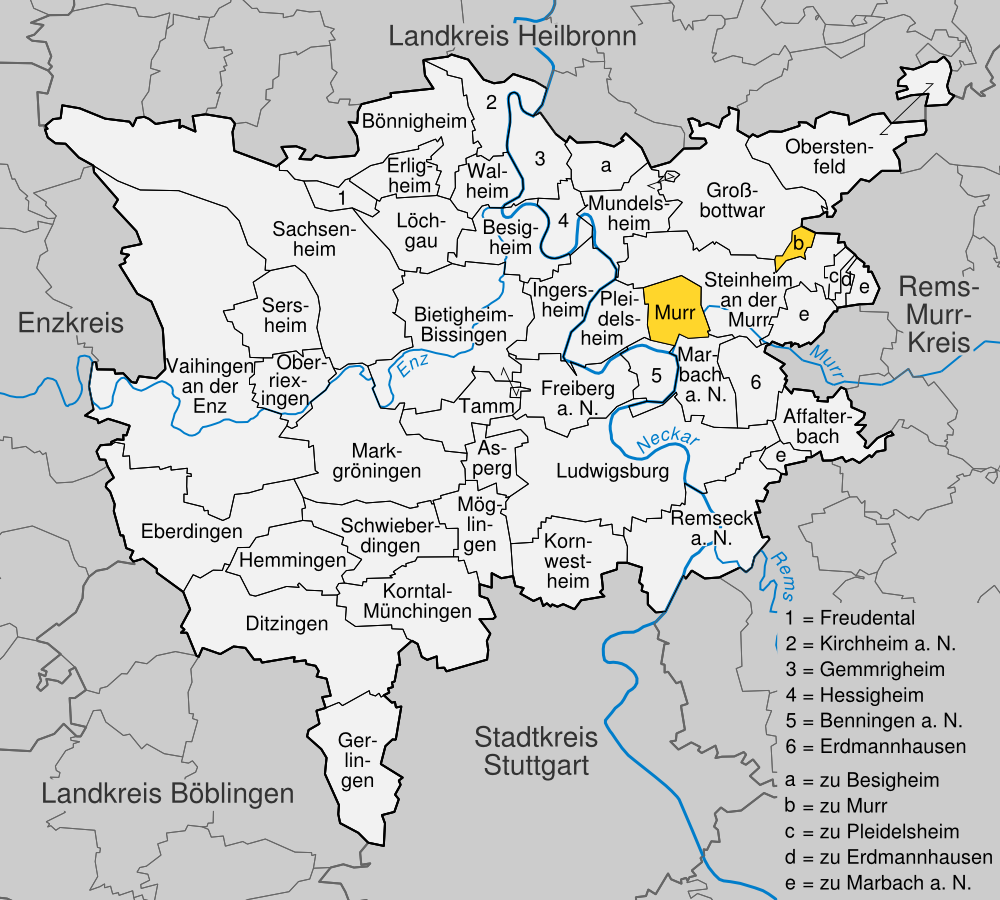
- Location of Murr within Ludwigsburg district
- Interactive map of Murr
- Location within Germany Location within Baden-Württemberg
- Coordinates: 48°58′N 9°16′E
- Country: Germany
- State: Baden-Württemberg
- Admin. region: Stuttgart
- District: Ludwigsburg

Government
  - Mayor (2020–28): Torsten Bartzsch

Area
  - Total: 7.79 km^{2} (3.01 sq mi)
- Elevation: 203 m (666 ft)

Population (2025-12-31)
  - Total: 6,593
  - Density: 846/km^{2} (2,190/sq mi)
- Time zone: UTC+01:00 (CET)
  - Summer (DST): UTC+02:00 (CEST)
- Postal codes: 71711
- Dialling codes: 07144
- Vehicle registration: LB
- Website: www.gemeinde-murr.de

Murr (German pronunciation: [mʊʁ]) is a municipality in the district of Ludwigsburg, Baden-Württemberg, Germany. It is situated on the river Murr, 2 km upstream from its confluence with the Neckar and about 9 km northeast of Ludwigsburg.

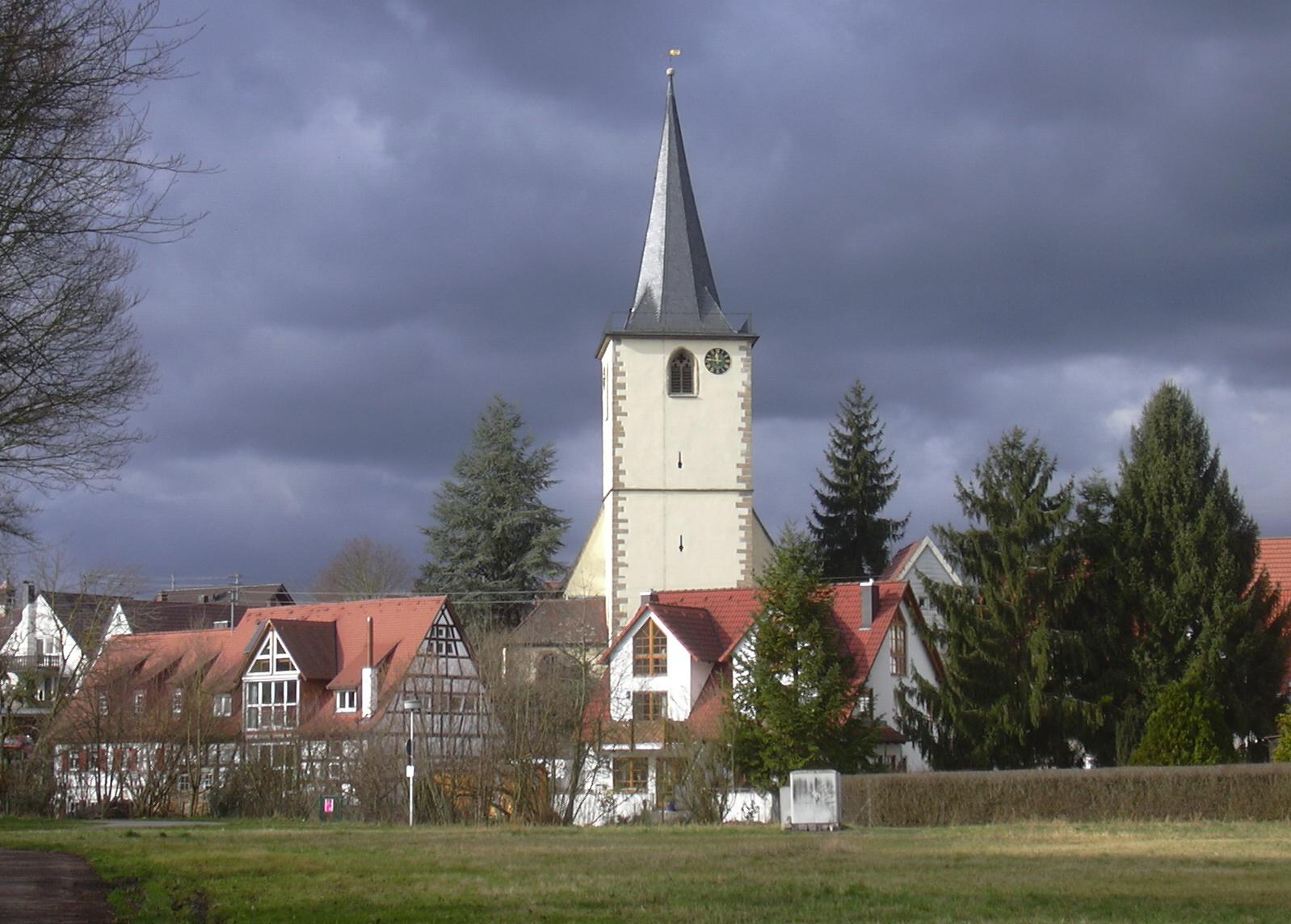
View of the village with church, Murr, Germany

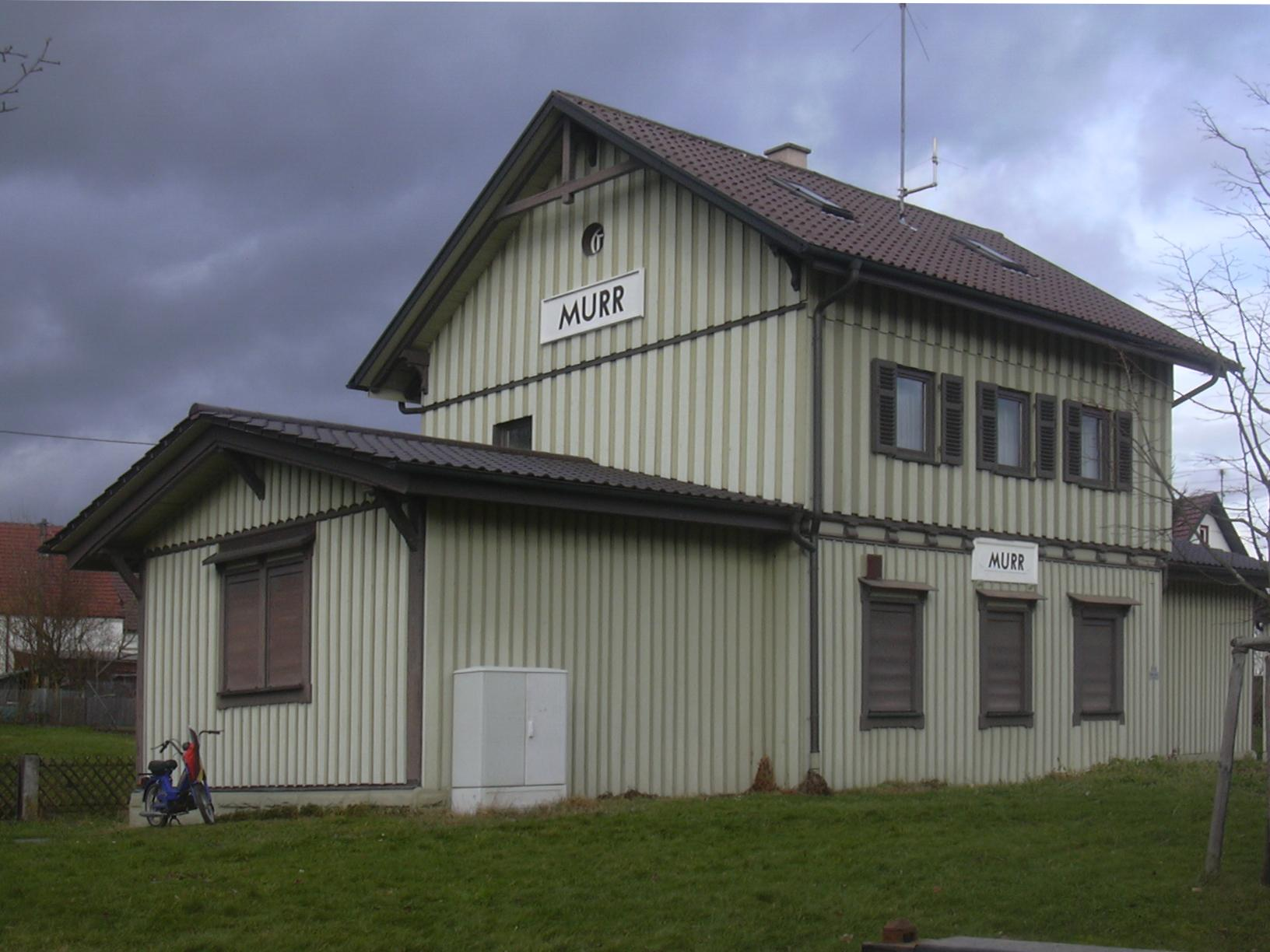
Disused railway station in Murr, Germany

== Geography ==
=== Geographical location ===
Murr lies in the Neckar Basin in 196 to 261 meters height at the Murr, two kilometers before it flows into the Neckar and about twelve kilometers north of Ludwigsburg. An uninhabited exclave in the Hardtwald near Rielingshausen is attributed to the natural area Swabian-Franconian Forest.

=== Neighbouring communities ===
Neighboring municipalities are Pleidelsheim in the west, Marbach in the south and Benningen am Neckar in the southwest, as well as Steinheim an der Murr in the east, which merges directly into the municipal area of Murr.

=== Municipal structure ===
To Murr belong the village Murr and the farmstead Sonnenhof.

=== Areal distribution ===
According to data from the Statistisches Landesamt, as of 2014.

== Demographics ==
Population development:

Year	Inhabitants
1990	4,660
2001	5,839
2011	6,187
2021	6,703

== Politics ==
=== City Council ===
The municipal council in Murr has 14 members. The municipal elections on May 26, 2019 led to the following result. The municipal council consists of the elected honorary municipal councillors and the mayor as chairman. The mayor is entitled to vote in the municipal council.

Parties and Voter Associations		% 2019	Seats; 2019	% 2014	Seats; 2014
FW	Free Voters Association Murr	34,15	5	37.15	5
CDU	Christian Democratic Union of Germany	26.73	4	28.23	4
SPD	Social Democratic Party of Germany	21,30	3	23,51	3
GREEN	Alliance 90/The Greens	17.82	2	11,10	2
total		100,0	14	100,0	14
Voter turnout		67,28 %		57,41 %	

=== Mayor ===
Torsten Bartzsch (independent) is mayor of the municipality of Murr since July 1, 2012. He was elected on April 22, 2012, in the first ballot with 72.26% of the votes and confirmed in office on April 26, 2020, with 95.36% of the votes. His predecessor was Manfred Hollenbach (CDU), who served as mayor from 1972 to 2012.

=== Crest and flag ===
The municipal coat of arms is under a golden shield head, in it a black stag pole, split by gold and red, in front a red chalice, in the back an upright golden hafthorn with green shackle pointing to the splitting. The municipal flag is red-yellow and was awarded on April 18, 1980.

== Notable people ==
- Marcus Ziegler (* 1973), former professional footballer (VfB Stuttgart)
