= Klaus Kolley =

German nationalist and activist

Klaus Kolley was a German nationalist and activist in the National Democratic Party of Germany (NPD). He had ties to the East-German Stasi.

In 1969 while serving as a bodyguard for the chairman of the NPD Adolf von Thadden, he opened fire on two unarmed, young counter-demonstrators at a party venue in Kassel. Political scientists believe that this event is one of the factors contributing to the nationalist party failing to win seats in the Bundestag at the 1969 German federal election.

== Life ==
Klaus Kolley was born in 1930, in Württemberg. He attendend training as a publishing business specialist and worked for Fackelverlag in Stuttgart.

Kolley had a criminal record for illegal possession of weapons. From 1956 to 1960 he served time in a penitentiary for gang-related robbery and repeat offenses of theft. The Federal Public Prosecutor-General investigated him due to his ties to the East-German Stasi. Even as an NPD member he had worked for the Stasi as a courier under the codename "Sys".

He became a member of the NPD and pursued a career within the party order service ("Ordnungsdienst"). The unit was notorious for its violent tactics, reminiscent of the "Ordnungsdienste" of the early Nazi era. Kolley acted as "Federal chairman for the NPD order services" and bodyguard of party chairmen von Thadden.

=== Kassel shooting ===
On 16 September 1969 a party event for the 1969 federal election was supposed to take place in Kassel, where von Thadden appeared. Kasel police Chief Herbert Ahlborn had banned the event featuring Adolf von Thadden on short notice. Thadden instead held a press conference in hotel Hessenland and subsequently set off on foot for the nearby residence of NPD Hesse leader Werner Fischer. Along the way, he was followed by a group of protesters. Kolley approached the group in front of Fischer's residence, shouted, "Police, clear the way!" and fired a shot from a Mauser HSc into the air. Moments later, he fired a second and third shot and the demonstrators Bernd Lunkewitz, 22 years and Michael Hoke, 19 years collapsed in the street, each having been struck in the upper arm.

According to Der Spiegel, the NPD party leadership attempted to interfere with the police investigation by spreading the suggestion that the injured youngsters had inflicted the gunshot wounds upon themselves. The party also hired a private investigator to track down the shooter. Realizing that "the NPD merely wanted to use me as a political alibi" the investigator returned the assignment after two days.

Kolley was sentenced to 18 months in prison in 1970.

== Background ==
NPD had some success in state parliaments at this time. At the 1967 Schleswig-Holstein state election they gained 5.8 percent, in Rhineland-Palatinate 6.9 percent, in Lower Saxony 7 percent, in Bremen 8.8 percent. In the 1968 Baden-Württemberg state election the NPD gained 9.8 percent and it was likely that the party would win Bundestag seats at the 1969 German federal election.
