= Muhterem Aras =

German politician

Muhterem Aras MdL
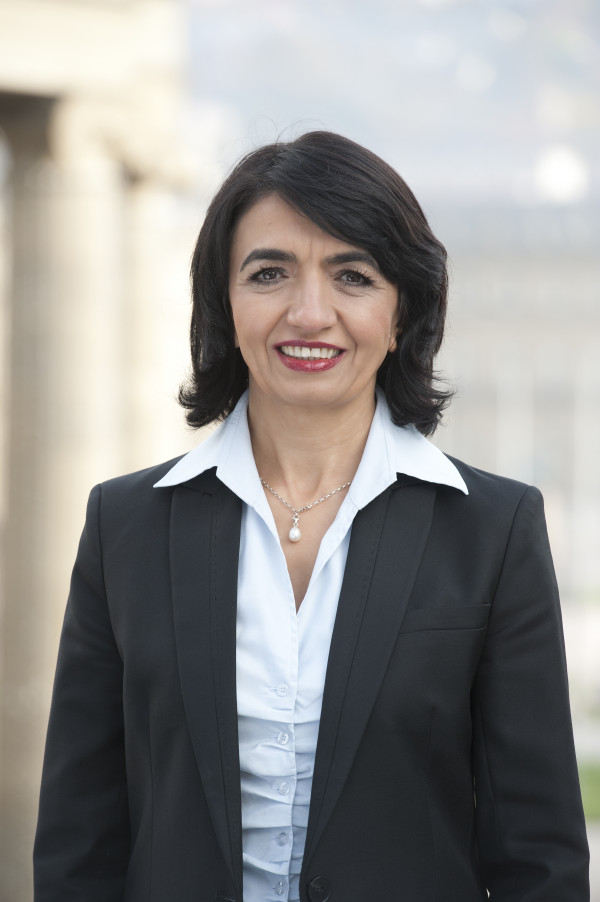
- Aras in 2016

Vice-President of the Landtag of Baden-Württemberg
- Incumbent
- Assumed office 12 May 2026
- President: Thomas Strobl
- Preceded by: Wolfgang Reinhart

President of the Landtag of Baden-Württemberg
- In office 11 May 2016 – 12 May 2026
- Preceded by: Wilfried Klenk
- Succeeded by: Thomas Strobl

Member of the Landtag of Baden-Württemberg for Stuttgart I
- Incumbent
- Assumed office 1 May 2011
- Preceded by: Andrea Krueger

Personal details
- Born: 2 January 1966 (age 60) Elmaağaç, Bingöl, Turkey
- Citizenship: German
- Party: Alliance 90/The Greens
- Education: University of Hohenheim
- Occupation: Politician

Muhterem Aras (born 2 January 1966) is a German politician of the Alliance '90/The Greens party, who has served as Vice-President of the Landtag of Baden-Württemberg since 2026, having previously served as its President between 2016 and 2026. She has been a Member of the Landtag of Baden-Württemberg for the constituency of Stuttgart I since May 2011.

== Early life ==
Aras was born in the eastern Anatolian village of Elmaağaç, Turkey, to a Kurdish Alevi family. She moved to Filderstadt in 1978 with her family.

== Education and profession ==
After matriculating in Stuttgart, she studied economics at the University of Hohenheim. In 2000 she founded an accounting firm with, at that time, twelve employees in Stuttgart.

== Political activity ==
Her political career began in 1992 when she entered the Green Party. In 1999, she was elected to the local council of Stuttgart. From 2007 to 2011, she was parliamentary leader of her party in that council.

In the 2011 Baden-Württemberg state election, she won the Erstmandat ("first mandate") in the Stuttgart I constituency with 42.5% of the votes cast. In 2011, Aras became the first Muslim woman to enter the Baden-Württemberg Landtag. She was a member of the Committee on Finance and Economic Affairs and the Committee on Culture, Youth and Sports, and was involved in the Green Party parliamentary group's fiscal policy work.

From 2014 to 2016, Aras was chair of the Stuttgart district association of Alliance 90/The Greens. In 2016 she ran again in the parliamentary constituency of Stuttgart I, and won the mandate with 42.4%, again the nation's best result for her party.

On 11 May 2016, Aras was elected as the new Baden-Württemberg Landtag president with the votes of 96 MPs, becoming the first member of the Greens, the first Muslim, and the first woman, to hold the position.

Aras was nominated by her party as a delegate to the 2022 Federal Conventions, which elects the President of Germany.

== Personal life ==
Aras is of Kurdish Alevi descent. She has been married since 1986 and has a son and a daughter. She lives in Stuttgart.
