= Jonathan Friedrich Bahnmaier =

German theologian and hymnwriter (1774–1841)

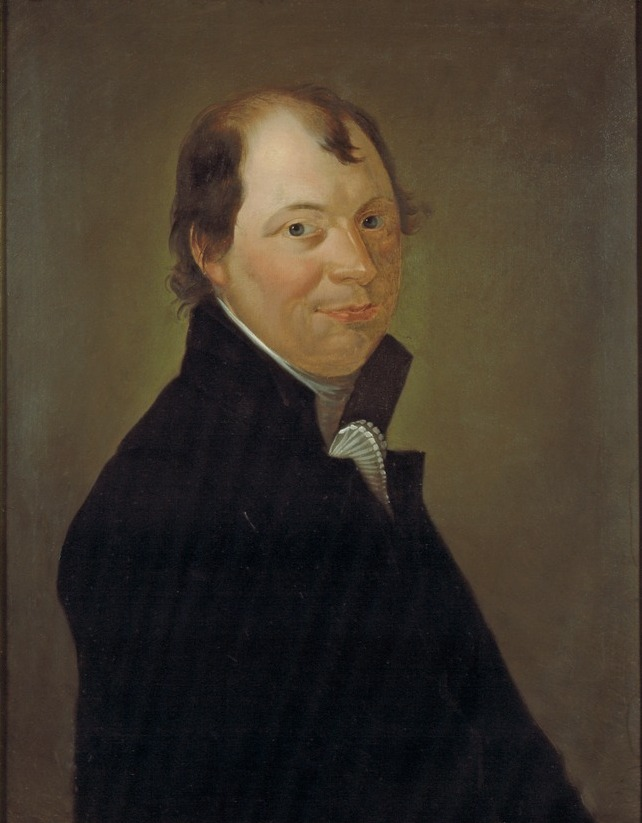
Jonathan Friedrich Bahnmaier, c. 1830

Jonathan Friedrich Bahnmaier (12 July 1774 – 18 August 1841) was a German Protestant theologian, university professor, and hymnwriter.

== Life ==
Jonathan Friedrich Bahnmaier was born on 12 July 1774, at Oberstenfeld, near Marbach, in Wurtemberg, where his father was minister. He studied theology at Tubingen, and assisted his father in his ministry until his death, in 1803.

In 1805 he travelled in Europe, and in 1806 was appointed to the Church at Marbach. In 1810 he removed to Ludwigsburg, and from 1815 to 1819 he was professor of theology at the University of Tubingen. Being unreasonably deprived of this position, he was appointed dean of Kirchheim, and in that office he died, on 18 August 1841.

== Works ==
He wrote, De Miraculis N. Test. Meletemata (Tubingen, 1797), besides a number of sermons and ascetical works which he published; he also wrote some hymns, one of which, Valte, walte, nah undfern, was translated into English by Catherine Winkworth, "Spread, oh spread, thou mighty Word".

== Sources ==
- Bautz, Friedrich Wilhelm (1990). "Bahnmaier, Jonathan Friedrich". In Biographisch-Bibliographisches Kirchenlexikon (BBKL). Vol. 1. 2nd ed. Hamm: Bautz. ISBN 3-88309-013-1. cols. 344–345.
- Julian, John (1907). "Bahnmaier, Jonathan Friedrich". In A Dictionary of Hymnology. Vol. 1. 2nd ed. New York: Dover Publications, Inc. pp. 106–107.
- Leube, Martin (1953). "Bahnmaier, Jonathan Friedrich". In Neue Deutsche Biographie (NDB). Vol. 1. Berlin: Duncker & Humblot. ISBN 3-428-00182-6. pp. 539–540.
- Miller, Josiah (1869). "Bahnmaier, Jonathan Friedrich". In Singers and Songs of the Church. 2nd ed. London: Longman, Green, and Co. p. 354.
- Palmer, Christian (1875). "Bahnmaier, Jonathan Friedrich". In Allgemeine Deutsche Biographie (ADB). Vol. 1. Leipzig: Duncker & Humblot. pp. 766–767.
- Winkworth, Catherine, trans. (1858). "The Diffusion of the Gospel". In Lyra Germanica. 2nd series. London: Longman, Brown, Green, Longmans, and Roberts. pp. 60–61.
- "Jonathan Friedrich Bahnmaier". The Canterbury Dictionary of Hymnology. Canterbury Press. Retrieved 4 November 2022.

Attribution:

- Pick, B. (1885). "Bahnmaier, Jonathan Friedrich". In McClintock, John; Strong, James (eds.). Cyclopædia of Biblical, Theological and Ecclesiastical Literature. Supplement.—Vol. 1. New York: Harper & Brothers. p. 300.
