= Tok (disambiguation) =

Tok, Alaska is a place in the United States.

Tok or TOK may also refer to:

== People ==
- Tok, a variant of Zhuo, a surname
- Barış Tok (born 1978), Turkish motorcycle racer
- Dan Ťok (born 1959), Czech politician
- Hüseyin Tok (born 1988), Turkish footballer
- Shawn Tok (born 1994), Singaporean singer
- Tayfun Tok (born 1986), German politician

== Other uses ==
- Tök, Pest county, Hungary
- T.O.K., a Jamaican reggae dancehall band
- TOK Coachlines, Canadian coach operator
- Tallarook railway station, Australia, station code TOK
- Theory of knowledge (IB course), a core subject of the International Baccalaureate Diploma Programme
- Toki Pona, a philosophical artistic constructed language, ISO 639-3 language code tok
- TOK, a Rossiya Segodnya project

== See also ==
- Tok Tok, former Arabic comic magazine
- Tok Tok Tok, German band 1998–2013
- TikTok, a video hosting service
- Tik and Tok, a robotic mime and music duo
- Tok Pisin, a creole language from Papua New Guinea
- Tokelau, dependent territory of New Zealand
