= 1964 Baden-Württemberg state election =

State election in Germany

- 26 April 1964

All 120 seats in the Landtag of Baden-Württemberg 61 seats needed for a majority
- Turnout: 3,705,791 (64.74%) ▲8.79%
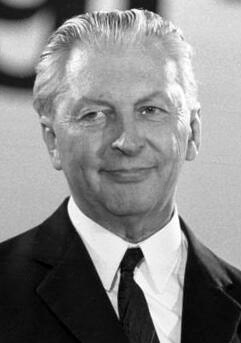

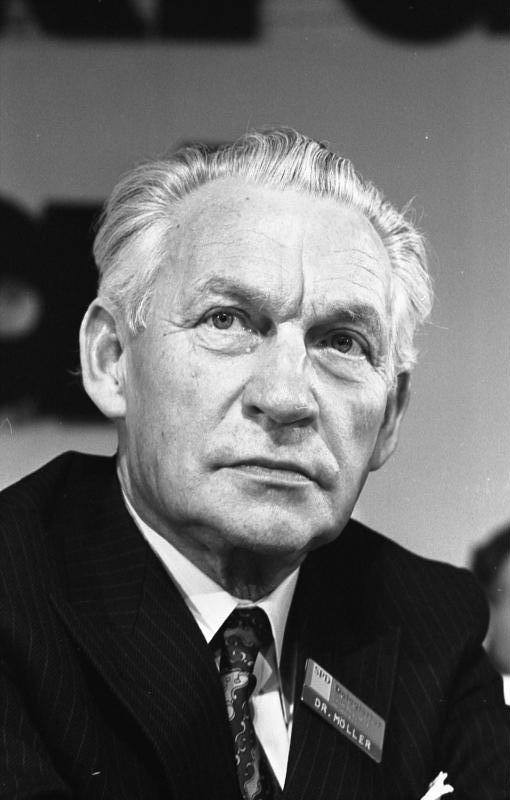
	First party	Second party	Third party
Leader	Kurt Georg Kiesinger	Alex Möller
Party	CDU	SPD	FDP
Last election	52 seats; 39.45%	44 seats, 35.50%	18 seats, 15.84%
Seats won	59	47	14
Seat change	▲7	▲3	▼4
Popular vote	1,671,674	1,350,314	472,492
Percentage	46.18%	37.30%	13.05%
Swing	▲6.73%	▲2.00%	▼2.79%
- Results for the single-member constituencies
Minister-President before election
Kurt Georg Kiesinger
CDU
Elected Minister-President
Kurt Georg Kiesinger
CDU

The 1964 Baden-Württemberg state election was held on 26 April 1964 to elect the members of the 3rd Landtag of Baden-Württemberg. The incumbent Christian Democratic Union (CDU) government under Minister-President Kurt Georg Kiesinger was re-elected.

== History ==
Following the 1960 Baden-Württemberg state election, Minister-President Kurt Georg Kiesinger had formed a coalition of the Christian Democratic Union (CDU), Free Democratic Party (FDP), and All-German Party. Following the election, Kiesinger remained Minister-President, and the coalition agreement between the CDU and FDP was renewed; with the All-German Party failing to win any seats in the Landtag. In 1966, Kiesinger became Chancellor of West Germany and was succeeded by Hans Filbinger as Minister-President of Baden-Württemberg prior to the 1968 Baden-Württemberg state election.

== Parties ==
The table below lists parties represented in the previous Landtag of Baden-Württemberg.

Name		Ideology	Leader(s)	1960 result	
Name		Ideology	Leader(s)	Votes (%)	Seats
CDU	Christian Democratic Union of Germany; Christlich Demokratische Union Deutschlands	Christian democracy	Kurt Georg Kiesinger	39.45%	52 / 121
SPD	Social Democratic Party of Germany; Sozialdemokratische Partei Deutschlands	Social democracy	Alex Möller	35.50%	44 / 121
FDP	Free Democratic Party; Freie Demokratische Partei	Classical liberalism		15.84%	18 / 121
GDP	All-German Party; Gesamtdeutsche Partei	National conservatism		6.59%	7 / 121

== Results ==
Summary of the 26 April 1964 election results for the Landtag of Baden-Württemberg
Party	Votes	%	+/-	Seats	+/-	Seats %
Christian Democratic Union (CDU)	1,671,674	46.18	▲6.73	59	▲7	49.17
Social Democratic Party (SPD)	1,350,314	37.30	▲2.00	47	▲3	39.17
Free Democratic Party (FDP)	472,492	13.05	▼2.79	14	▼4	11.66
All-German Party	65,759	1.82	▼4.77	0	▼7	0
German Peace Union	49,191	1.36	New	0	±0	0
German Community	10,322	0.29	▲0.11	0	±0	0
Total	3,619,901	97.68		120	▼1	
Invalid votes	85,890	2.32				
Voter turnout	3,705,791	64.74	▲8.79			
