= Democratic Left (Germany, 1967) =

Democratic Left Demokratische Linke
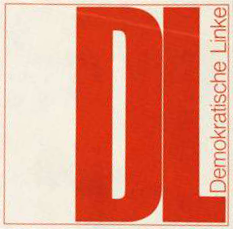
- Abbreviation: DL
- Leader: Eugen Eberle
- Founded: November 22, 1967
- Dissolved: 1970
- Preceded by: Communist Party of Germany (de facto)
- Ideology: Socialism
- Political position: Left-wing

The Democratic Left (German: Demokratische Linke), short-form: DL, was a short-lived socialist political party in West Germany that was primarily active in the south German state of Baden-Württemberg. A large part of its membership consisted of former Communist Party of Germany (KPD) politicians. The party positioned itself left of the Social Democratic Party of Germany (SPD), aiming to provide a left-wing alternative to the first Grand Coalition.

== History ==
The party was founded on 22 November 1967 in Bad Cannstadt, Stuttgart by former Communist Party of Germany (KPD) politicians, most notably Eugen Eberle, who became leader of the new party. The founding congress of the party was attended by at least 1,100 people and officially adopted the party program. It was founded with a special focus on the upcoming 1968 Baden-Württemberg state election.

While the foundation of this new party was initially criticized by the broader left-wing opposition in West Germany, particularly the German Peace Union (DFU) which hoped to reach the 5%-threshold in the upcoming election, the DL would quickly be embraced by other left-wing organizations that hoped to use it to their advantage. Particularly the leader of the Baden-Württemberg branch of the DFU, Heinz Seeger, pushed for a coalition with the new party, wanting to provide every voter an alternative to the Grand Coalition and viewing the party as a first step to a 'peoples front' against the Grand Coalition that could theoretically also include a new communist party.

Initially, the Democratic Left was viewed as a protest party in the public eye, this quickly changed however as the Social Democratic Party of Germany (SPD) recognized the Democratic Left as competition and labeled it as a "communist front organization", an accusation that only grew stronger after the names of the candidates were published, with almost half of the 140 candidates being former KPD members, including the lead candidate and party leader Eugen Eberle.

The results of the 1968 Baden-Württemberg state election disappointed. While the Democratic Left received 2.27% (88,187 second votes), and thus missed the 5%-threshold for parliamentary representation, the National Democratic Party of Germany (NPD) made massive gains, gaining parliamentary representation for the first time in the state. The election was widely commented on as a rightwards shift (Rechtsruck) in Baden-Württemberg. While the Democratic Left decided to continue its work and participated in the following local elections in Baden-Württemberg and Hesse, though mostly via electoral alliances with the DFU and independents, its fate was pretty much sealed after the state election.

The Democratic Left dissolved itself in 1970 with the votes of the party's communist members against the will of the party leader Eugen Eberle.

== Ideology ==
The party supported increased democratic participation, the diplomatic recognition of East Germany as well as the Oder–Neisse line and opposed the German Emergency Acts. The DL also strongly opposed the relatively new National Democratic Party of Germany (NPD), the members of which it called 'neo-Nazis'. The party also opposed the Grand Coalition which it viewed as pulling the SPD to the right.

The DL was labeled the "USPD of the year 1967" by Die Zeit.

== Literature ==
- Stöss, Richard. Parteien-Handbuch Band 1: AUD bis EFP - Die Parteien der Bundesrepublik Deutschland 1949-1980. Westdeutscher Verlag. ISBN 3-531-11570-7
