= Höpfigheim =

Coordinates: 48°59′N 9°15′E

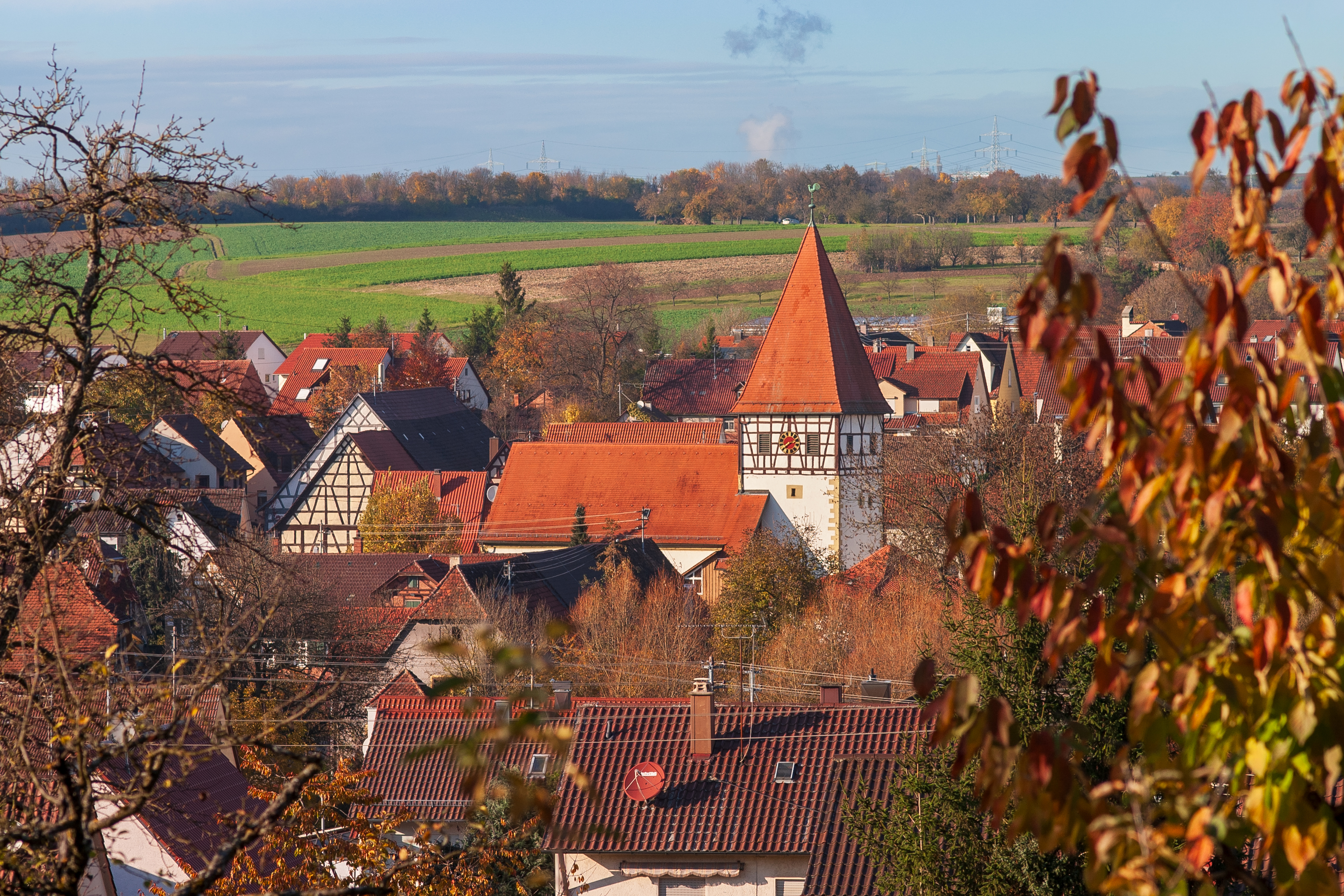
The town centre, including the church

Höpfigheim (German pronunciation: [ˈhœp͡fɪkˌhaɪ̯m]) is a town in Steinheim an der Murr, Ludwigsburg District, in the state of Baden-Württemberg, Germany. The former municipal coat of arms of Höpfigheim shows in blue a golden hunting horn with the mouthpiece turned to the left on a golden shackle under a lying golden stag antler.
