= Stuttgart I (Landtag electoral district) =

State electoral district of Germany

1: Stuttgart I
- Electoral district for the Landtag of Baden-Württemberg
- Stuttgart I in 2024
- District: Stuttgart
- Electorate: 97,613 (2026)
- Major settlements: City-districts Stuttgart-Mitte; Stuttgart-Nord; Stuttgart-Süd; and Stuttgart-West, and sub-districts of Gänsheide and Uhlandshöhe of city-district Stuttgart-Ost

Current electoral district
- Created: 2011
- Party: Green
- Member: Muhterem Aras

Stuttgart I is an electoral constituency (German: Wahlkreis) represented in the Landtag of Baden-Württemberg. Since 2021, it has elected one member via first-past-the-post voting. Voters cast a second vote under which additional seats are allocated proportionally state-wide. Under the constituency numbering system, it is designated as constituency 1. It is wholly within the city of Stuttgart.

== Geography ==
The constituency includes the city-districts of Stuttgart-Mitte, Stuttgart-Nord, Stuttgart-Süd, and Stuttgart-West, and the Stuttgart-Ost sub-districts of Gänsheide and Uhlandshöhe, within the city of Stuttgart.

There were 97,613 eligible voters in 2026.

== Members ==
=== First mandate ===
Both before and after the electoral reforms for the 2021 election, the winner of the plurality of the vote (first-past-the-post) in every constituency won the first mandate.

Election	Member	Party	%
1976	Peter Wetter	CDU	
1980	Peter Wetter	CDU	
1984	Peter Wetter	CDU	
1988	Peter Wetter	CDU	
1992	Claudia Hübner	CDU	
1996	Eva Stanienda	CDU	
2001	Rolf Gassmann	SPD	
2006	Andrea Krueger	CDU	
2011	Muhterem Aras	Grüne	42.5
2016	Muhterem Aras	Grüne	42.4
2021	Muhterem Aras	Grüne	44.8
2026	Muhterem Aras	Grüne	46.9

=== Second mandate ===
Prior to the electoral reforms for the 2026 election, the seats in the state parliament were allocated proportionately amongst parties which received more than 5% of valid votes across the state. The seats that were won proportionally for parties that did not win as many first mandates as seats they were entitled to, were allocated to their candidates which received the highest proportion of the vote in their respective constituencies. This meant that following some elections, a constituency would have one or more members elected under a second mandate.

Prior to 2011, these second mandates were allocated to the party candidates who got the greatest number of votes, whilst from 2011-2021, these were allocated according to percentage share of the vote.

Election	Member	Party	Member	Party
1976	Michael Sexauer	SPD	Ingrid Walz	FDP
1980	Michael Sexauer	SPD	Ingrid Walz	FDP
1984	Rezzo Schlauch	Grüne		
1988	Birgitt Bender	Grüne		
1992	Birgitt Bender	Grüne		
1996	Birgitt Bender	Grüne		
2001	Brigitte Lösch	Grüne		
2006	Brigitte Lösch	Grüne		
2011				
2016
2021

== Election results ==
=== 2026 election ===
State election (2026): Stuttgart I
Notes:	Blue background denotes the winner of the electorate vote. Pink background denotes a candidate elected from their party list. Yellow background denotes an electorate win by a list member, or other incumbent. A ✓ or ✗ denotes status of any incumbent, win or lose respectively.						
Party	Candidate	Votes	%	±%	Party votes	%	±%
Greens	✓ Muhterem Aras	34,350	46.9	▲2.1	36,700	50.0	▲5.2
CDU	Teresa Schreiber	17,400	23.8	▲5.9	14,377	19.6	▲1.7
Left	Mersedeh Ghazaei	7,023	9.6	▲2.1	7,060	9.6	▲2.1
AfD	Arthur Hammerschmidt	4,354	6.0	▲2.7	4,512	6.2	▲2.9
SPD	Hanna Binder	3,823	5.2	▼4.1	2,995	4.1	▼5.3
FDP	Claudia Schober	3,336	4.6	▼5.5	3,981	5.4	▼4.7
Volt	Celine Hirschka	1,703	2.3	▲1.0	1,070	1.5	▲0.2
BSW					907	1.2	
FW					454	0.6	▼0.3
PARTEI	Jasper Pannen	798	1.1	▼0.6	354	0.5	▼1.2
APT	Moritz Riedacher	382	0.5		345	0.5	
dieBasis					98	0.1	
ÖDP					88	0.1	▼0.3
Values					81	0.1	
Bündnis C					66	0.1	
KlimalisteBW					58	0.1	▼1.0
Team Todenhöfer					48	0.1	
Pensioners					46	0.1	
Humanists					45	0.1	
Verjüngungsforschung					41	0.1	
PdF					38	0.1	
Informal votes		337			142		
Total valid votes		73,169			73,364		
Turnout		73,506	75.3	▲5.9			
Greens hold	Majority	16,950	23.1	▼3.8			

=== 2021 election ===
State election (2026): Stuttgart I
Party	Candidate	Votes	%	±%
Greens	Muhterem Aras	30,491	44.8	▲2.4
CDU	Ruth Schagemann	12,181	17.9	▼1.0
FDP	Johanna Molitor	6,864	10.1	▲0.4
SPD	Sascha Meßmer	6,365	9.4	▼1.3
Left	Filipo Capezzone	5,125	7.5	▲0.2
AfD	Steffen Degler	2,231	3.3	▼3.7
PARTEI	Humann	1,149	1.7	▲1.0
Volt	Moritz Klug	877	1.3	
KlimalisteBW	Jonathan Heckert	766	1.1	
FW	Markus Mangold	623	0.9	
Pirates	Oliver Buckardsmaier	510	0.8	▼0.5
WiR2020	Christoph Hueck	476	0.7	
ÖDP	Iris Baur	303	0.4	Steady
Independent	Vasim Barkavi	25	0.0	
Majority		18,310	26.9	
Rejected ballots		182	0.3	▼0.1
Turnout		68,168	69.4	▼5.5
Registered electors		98,228		
Greens hold		Swing		

== See also ==
- Politics of Baden-Württemberg
- Landtag of Baden-Württemberg
