= Tobias Vogt (politician, born 1985) =

German politician (born 1985)

Member of the Landtag of Baden-Württemberg
- Incumbent
- Assumed office 11 May 2021

Personal details
- Born: 11 June 1985 (age 41)
- Party: Christian Democratic Union (since 2008)

Tobias Vogt (born 11 June 1985) is a German politician serving as a member of the Landtag of Baden-Württemberg since 2021. He has served as secretary general of the CDU Baden-Württemberg since 2025. As of 2025, he has been part of Mittelstandsund Wirtschaftsunion (MIT) since 2020.
