= Oberstenfeld =

- Municipality
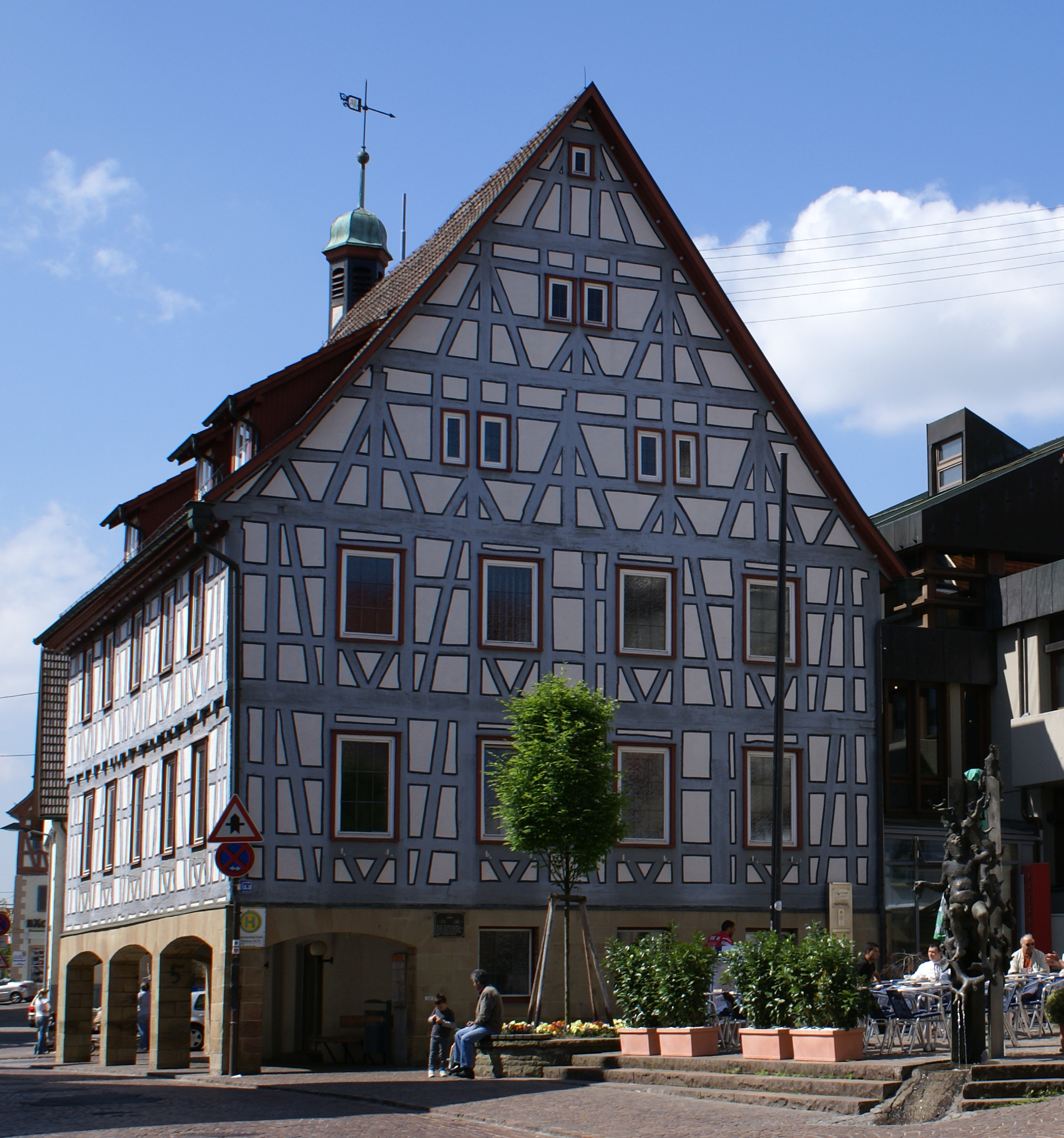
- Town hall

- Coat of arms

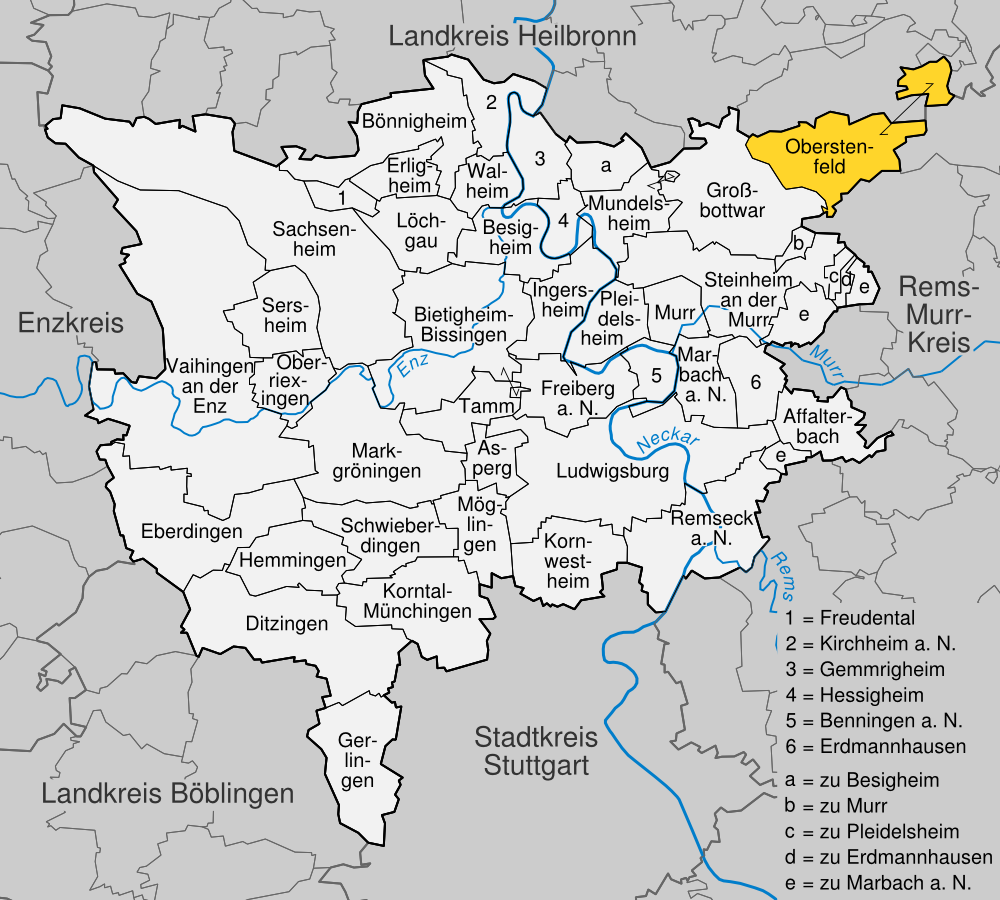
- Location of Oberstenfeld within Ludwigsburg district
- Interactive map of Oberstenfeld
- Location within Germany Location within Baden-Württemberg
- Coordinates: 49°01′26″N 9°19′10″E
- Country: Germany
- State: Baden-Württemberg
- Admin. region: Stuttgart
- District: Ludwigsburg
- Subdivisions: 3

Government
  - Mayor (2023–31): Markus Kleemann

Area
  - Total: 21.10 km^{2} (8.15 sq mi)
- Elevation: 246 m (807 ft)

Population (2025-12-31)
  - Total: 7,505
  - Density: 355.7/km^{2} (921.2/sq mi)
- Time zone: UTC+01:00 (CET)
  - Summer (DST): UTC+02:00 (CEST)
- Postal codes: 71720
- Dialling codes: 07062
- Vehicle registration: LB
- Website: oberstenfeld.de

Oberstenfeld (German pronunciation: [ˈoːbɐstn̩ˌfɛlt]) is a municipality in the district of Ludwigsburg in Baden-Württemberg in Germany. It is located about 40 km north of Stuttgart.

== Geography ==
Oberstenfeld is located in the upper Bottwar river valley. It lies in the northeast of the district of Ludwigsburg. In the north it borders to the Löwenstein Hills, in the west there are the hills Forstberg and Wunnenstein covered by vineyards.

=== Neighboring towns ===
The closest neighboring towns are Beilstein to the north and Großbottwar to the south.

=== Incorporated villages ===
The villages Gronau (located northeast of Oberstenfeld) and Prevorst (located about five kilometers northeast in the Löwensteiner Berge hills) are incorporated.

Prevorst is an exclave located between the Heilbronn district and the Rems-Murr district. With an elevation of 482m it is the highest location of the Ludwigsburg district.

== Transport ==
=== Road links ===
The motorway Autobahn A81 (Zürich – Singen – Würzburg – Hamburg) is nearby and reachable within minutes.

=== Public transport ===
The Verkehrs- und Tarifverbund Stuttgart (VVS) operates bus stops in Oberstenfeld and its incorporated villages which connects them to the larger metropolitan area Stuttgart. Northwards, when crossing the border to the Heilbronn district, starting in the neighboring town of Beilstein, the buses are operated by the Heilbronner Hohenloher Haller Nahverkehr (HNV), giving access to the city of Heilbronn.

== History ==
Oberstenfeld originated in the 7th or 8th century, and belonged to the Lichtenberg castle residing above the town.

The Oberstenfeld nunnery was founded in 1016 CE, its patronage was taken over in 1357 CE when the count of Lichtenberg sold the town to the dukes of Württemberg. In 1540 CE it adopted the reformation but remained a part of the Imperial Knights until 1803 CE when it was taken in by the duchy of Württemberg.

The community Prevorst as well as the Lichtenberg castle were taken over by the dukes of Württemberg from the count of Lichtenberg in 1357 CE, (A few years before in (1350 CE) they had acquired Gronau from the Margraves of Baden, and from this time Prevorst belonged to Gronau).

The three villages were conjointly assigned to the de:Oberamt Marbach since 1810 CE. In 1938 CE Oberstenfeld was allotted to the Ludwigsburg district while Gronau and Prevorst became a part of the Heilbronn district. On January 1, 1972, Gronau and Prevorst changed the district and were assigned to Oberstenfeld.

== Politics ==
=== Municipal council ===
The outcome of the municipal council elections on June 13. 2004 was:

- FBWV 31,9% (−0,9): 6 seats (=)
- CDU 28,1% (−0,4): 6 seats (=)
- SPD 23,9% (+1,6): 5 seats (+1)
- OBLO 16,0% (−0,4): 3 seats (=)

== Demographics ==
Population development:

Year	Inhabitants
1990	7,666
2001	7,889
2011	7,843
2021	7,941

== State institutions ==
=== Education ===
The Lichtenbergschule in Oberstenfeld is an elementary school and a Hauptschule with Werkrealschule. There are six Kindergartens.

== Public institutions ==
=== Religion ===
There are one Roman Catholic and three Protestant churches as well as one mosque.

== Culture and attractions ==
=== Sights ===
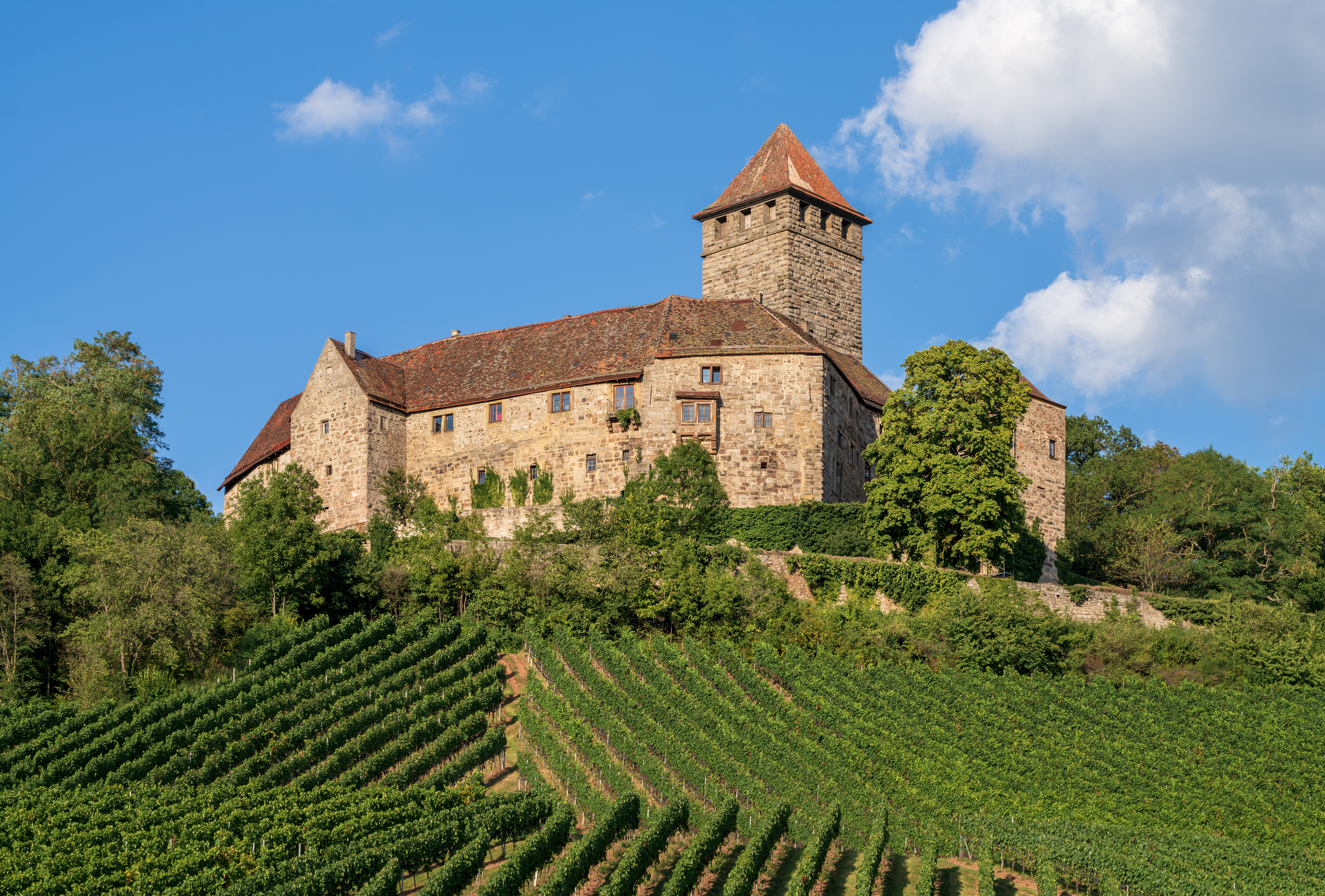
Lichtenberg castle

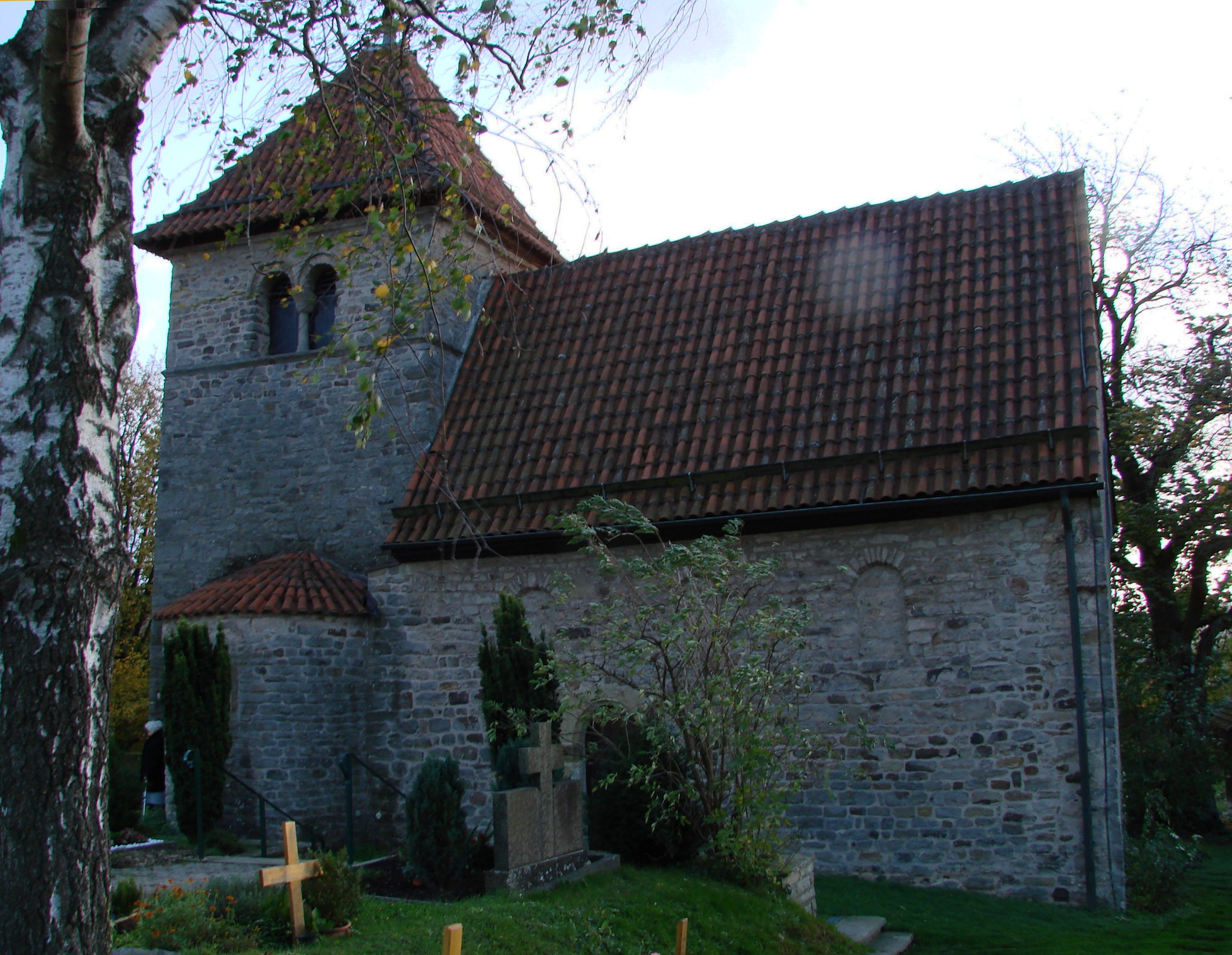
Peterskirche

Located on top of a hill, amidst idyllic vineyards, the town is guarded by the Lichtenberg castle.

The Romanesque Peterskirche (Peter's church) is situated on a hill, about one kilometer north of downtown Oberstenfeld. Built in the mid 11th century, it is a relict of a lost precursor commune. The choir was arched over and the church's inside was painted with frescos in the 13th century. Some of those frescos are still present today. The church was nearly forgotten and unused for a long time. However, it is used for protestant and occasionally also for Roman Catholic services since it was restored between 1973 and 1976.

The Cyriakuskirche (Cyriakus' church), located in Gronau, is second eldest church of the municipality. Its choirtower is a relict of the Gothic first building phase in the 13th and 14th century. It was rebuilt and extended in 1599.

The collegiate church (German: "Stiftskirche") St. Johannes der Täufer (St. John the Baptist), located downtown Oberstenfeld, is one of the state's most important Romanesque churches. The nave was built about 1220, the choirtower about 1230 CE. It is open to the public May to October on Sundays between 11 am and 1 pm. Guided tours are available for value.

Nearby is the Dorfkirche (community church), which was built in the 9th century as Galluskapelle (Gallus' chapel). It became the prayer room of the market town community in contradiction to the collegiate church which was reserved for the canonesses. After heavy damage in 1693 it was newly built in 1738. The porch in the north is decorated with the coat of arms of the municipality, which can also be found on the weather vane.

In the centre are a few restored baroque timbered framed houses. Among them are:

- the town hall, built single-story in 1698 and got two more stories attached in 1840
- the timber-framed house in the Großbottwerer Straße 14, built in 1700
- the bakery which is the former de:Pfrundhaus built in 1702, originally used as dwelling for the canonesses. It is also the birthplace of the democrat Johannes Nefflen
- the winemaker's house (Winzerhaus) in Berggasse 2, built in 1737
- the cooper's house (Küferhaus) in the Küfergasse 15, built in 1726

A few minutes walk south of the old centre is the former train station of the Bottwarbahn.

== Economy ==
Oberstenfeld has several medium-sized businesses as well as bigger employers like Werzalit or Hoerbiger.

=== Twin towns ===
In September 2005 Italian Town of Verbicaro in the Province of Cosenza became a sister city. Many of the citizens of Italian descent have roots in this town in Calabria. A sign at the town's entrance was installed as a reminder of the town twinning.
