= Marcus Ziegler =

German footballer

Personal information
- Date of birth: 10 August 1973
- Place of birth: Germany
- Height: 1.80 m (5 ft 11 in)
- Position: Forward

Senior career*
Years	Team	Apps	(Gls)
1992–1994	VfB Stuttgart II		
1992–1996	VfB Stuttgart	8	(0)
1996	→ Strømsgodset (loan)		
1996–1997	SSV Ulm		
1997–1999	SSV Reutlingen		
1999–2001	VfR Mannheim	41	(5)

International career
1994	Germany U21	1	(0)
- * Club domestic league appearances and goals

Marcus Ziegler (born 10 August 1973) is a German former professional footballer who played as a forward.

He was capped once for Germany under-21 national team, in 1994. He was on the books of VfB Stuttgart from 1992 to 1996, appearing in eight Bundesliga matches. In the spring of 1996 he was loaned out to Strømsgodset IF in the Norwegian Eliteserien where he did not make an appearance. Failing to make an impact, he moved on to SSV Ulm 1846 in 1997. In 2000 he played for VfR Mannheim in the Regionalliga.
