= Tayfun Tok =

German politician (born 1986)

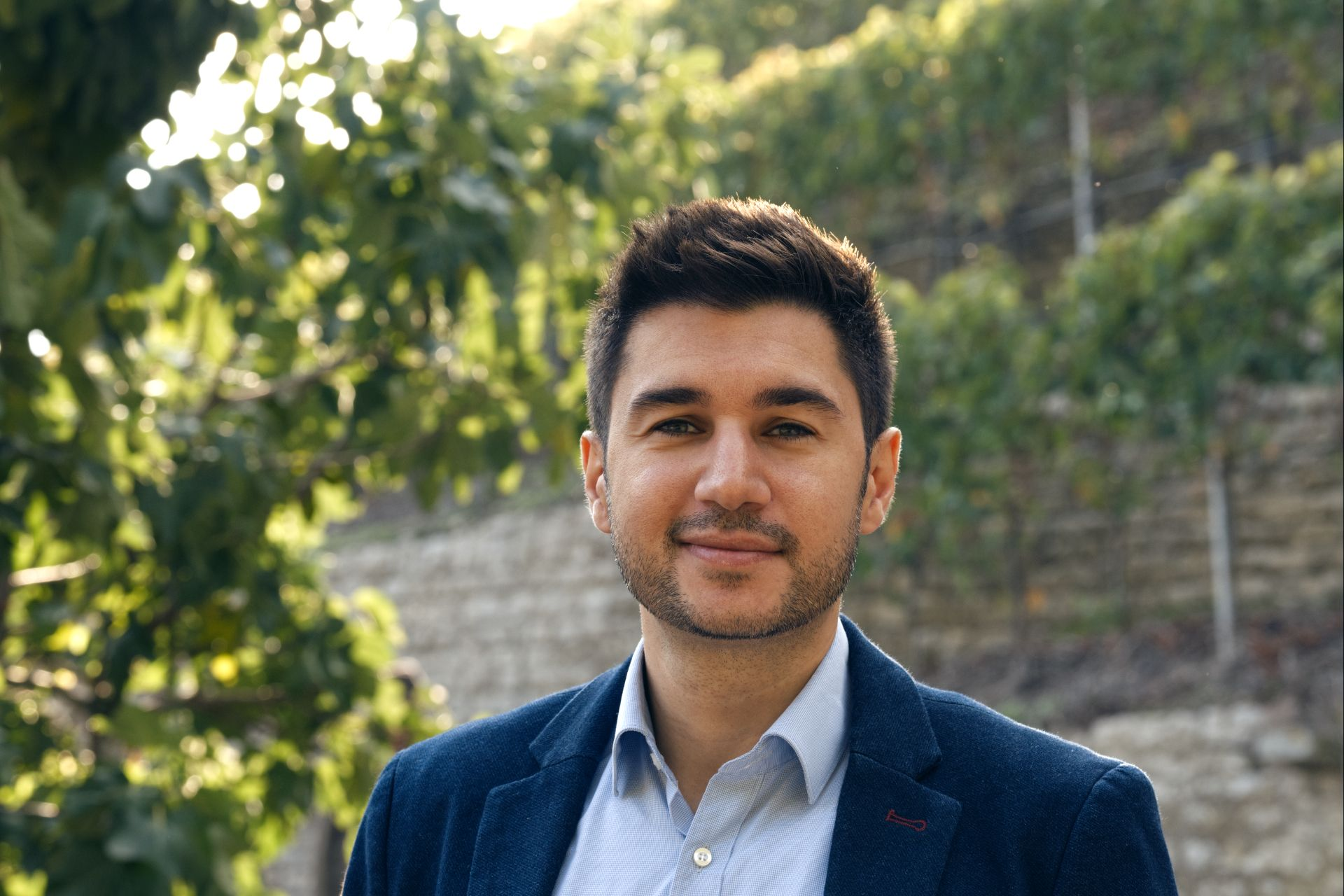
- Tok in 2021

Member of the Landtag of Baden-Württemberg
- Incumbent
- Assumed office 11 May 2021
- Constituency: Bietigheim-Bissingen

Personal details
- Born: 16 May 1986 (age 39)
- Party: Alliance 90/The Greens

Tayfun Tok (born 16 May 1986) is a German politician serving as a member of the Landtag of Baden-Württemberg since 2021. From 2006 to 2007, he served as spokesperson of the Green Youth in Ludwigsburg.
