= Wunnenstein =

Hill in Baden-Württemberg, Germany

Coordinates: 49°02′N 9°17′E

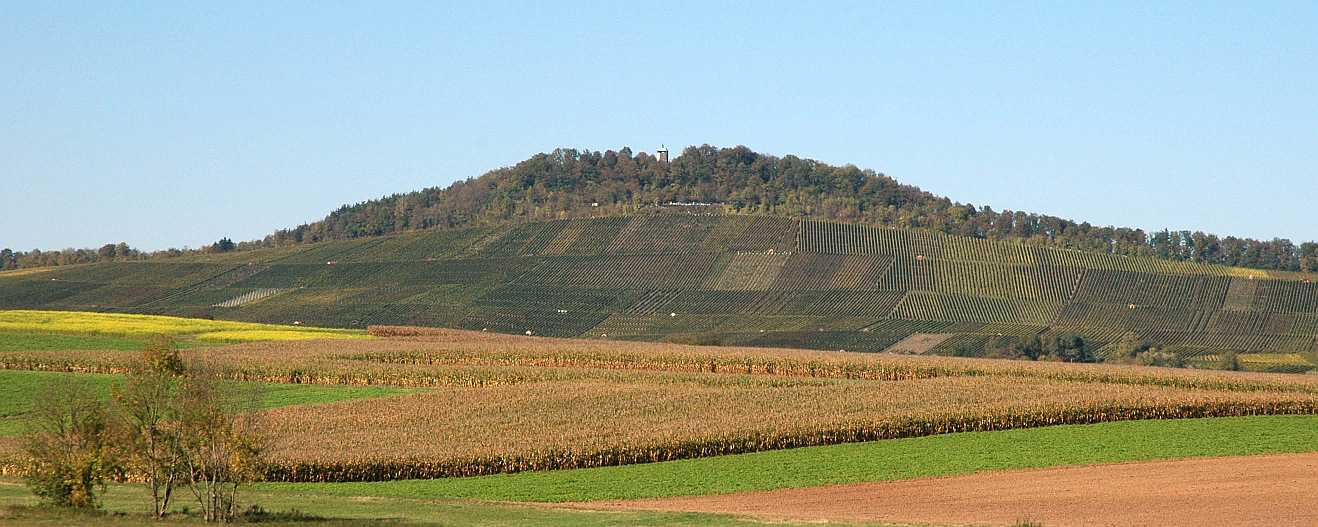

Highest point
- Elevation: 393.5 m (1,291 ft)

Geography
- Location: Baden-Württemberg, Germany

Wunnenstein is a hill in Baden-Württemberg, Germany.

== History ==
Evidence of human presence and habitation goes back 8-10,000 years. The Wunnenstein Castle (Burg Wunnenstein), ancestral seat of the Von Wunnensteins, was the reputed home of Wolf von Wunnenstein known as "Gleißende Wolf" or the Gleaming Wolf). Wolf von Wunnenstein died on November 9, 1413, which the same year the castle was laid siege to and destroyed, with only remnants remaining. The Wunnenstein Tower was built in 1888 from remnants of the castle and St. Michael's Church which was demolished in 1556. The bell in the church tower, named "Anna-Susanna", was the subject of an 1821 ballad Die Glocke vom Wunnenstein (The bell from Wunnenstein), by poet Gustav Schwab. Over 200 farmers gathered on the hill on Easter Sunday 1525, during the German Peasants' War.
