= Hausen am Bussen =

- Municipality
- Coat of arms

- Location of Hausen am Bussen within Alb-Donau-Kreis district
- Interactive map of Hausen am Bussen
- Location within Germany Location within Baden-Württemberg
- Coordinates: 48°12′42″N 9°37′31″E
- Country: Germany
- State: Baden-Württemberg
- Admin. region: Tübingen
- District: Alb-Donau-Kreis

Government
  - Mayor (2017–25): Hans Rieger

Area
  - Total: 3.52 km^{2} (1.36 sq mi)
- Elevation: 532 m (1,745 ft)

Population (2025-12-31)
  - Total: 277
  - Density: 78.7/km^{2} (204/sq mi)
- Time zone: UTC+01:00 (CET)
  - Summer (DST): UTC+02:00 (CEST)
- Postal codes: 89597
- Dialling codes: 07393
- Vehicle registration: UL

Hausen am Bussen is a town in the district of Alb-Donau in Baden-Württemberg in Germany.
