= Großbottwar =

- Town
- Coat of arms

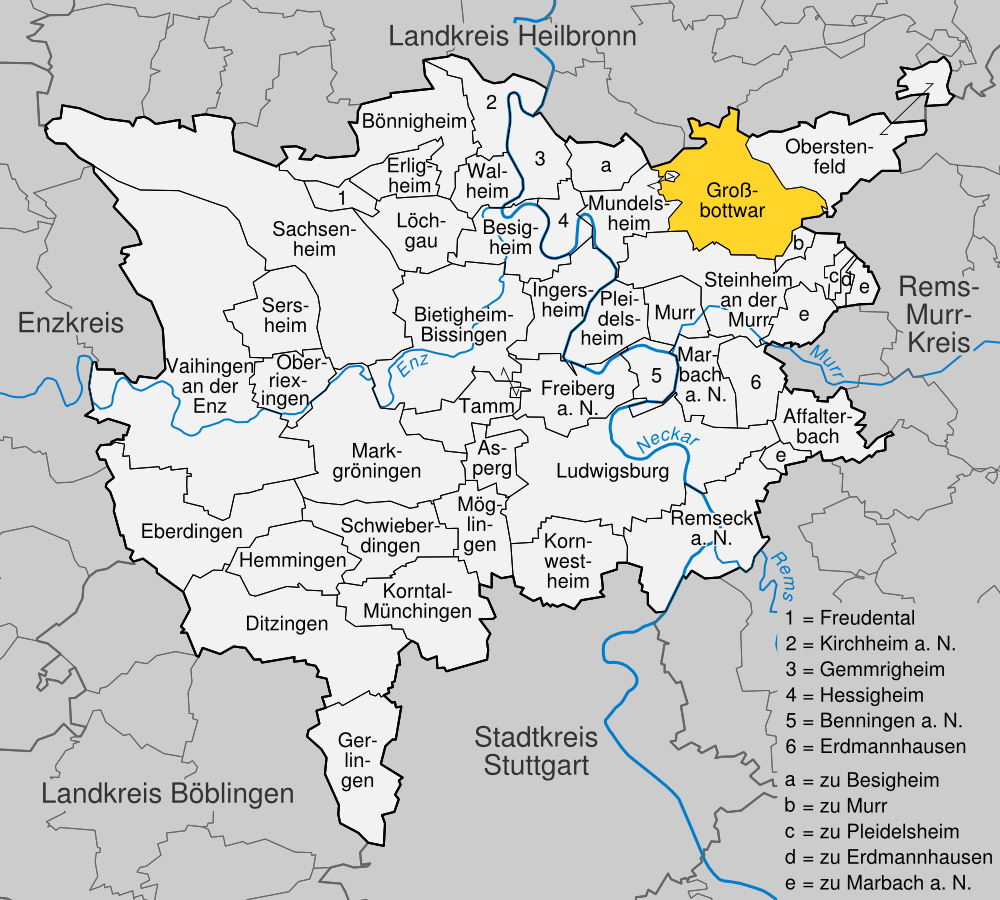
- Location of Großbottwar within Ludwigsburg district
- Interactive map of Großbottwar
- Location within Germany Location within Baden-Württemberg
- Coordinates: 49°0′5″N 9°17′35″E
- Country: Germany
- State: Baden-Württemberg
- Admin. region: Stuttgart
- District: Ludwigsburg

Government
  - Mayor (2017–25): Ralf Zimmermann

Area
  - Total: 25.51 km^{2} (9.85 sq mi)
- Elevation: 215 m (705 ft)

Population (2025-12-31)
  - Total: 7,951
  - Density: 311.7/km^{2} (807.3/sq mi)
- Time zone: UTC+01:00 (CET)
  - Summer (DST): UTC+02:00 (CEST)
- Postal codes: 71723
- Dialling codes: 07148
- Vehicle registration: LB
- Website: grossbottwar.de

Großbottwar (German pronunciation: [ɡʁoːsˈbɔtvaʁ], lit. 'Big Bottwar', in contrast to "Little Bottwar") is a town in the Ludwigsburg district of Baden-Württemberg, Germany. It sits within the Neckar River basin and is located on a tourist route through the Württemberg wine region. The Großbottwar region has been inhabited since at least the Stone Age and was occupied by the Romans. The town itself was founded sometime during the mid-13th century by an alliance of prominent families. In 1971, Großbottwar incorporated the formerly independent communities of Hof und Lembach and Winzerhausen.

Unlike most towns in the region, Großbottwar was neither heavily damaged by war nor by urban fires, so there are many old buildings from the 15th through the 17th centuries with original and well-preserved timber framing. The 16th century Rathaus, or town hall, is noted for its half-timber construction and decoratively carved façade. The Stadtschänke, approximately dated to 1434, is the oldest half-timber building in the Ludwigsburg district.

== Geography ==
Großbottwar is part of the Swabian-Franconian Forest and the Neckar Basin. The city is located in the Bottwar river valley in the north east district of Ludwigsburg. The Bottwar is a tributary of the Neckar River. Thirteen kilometres to the south east is the city of Ludwigsburg, and Heilbronn is sixteen km to the north east. The capital of the Baden-Württemberg region, Stuttgart, is 26 km to the south west.

Nearby is Wunnenstein mountain, the highest point of the Großbottwar area, at 394 metres above sea level.

== History ==
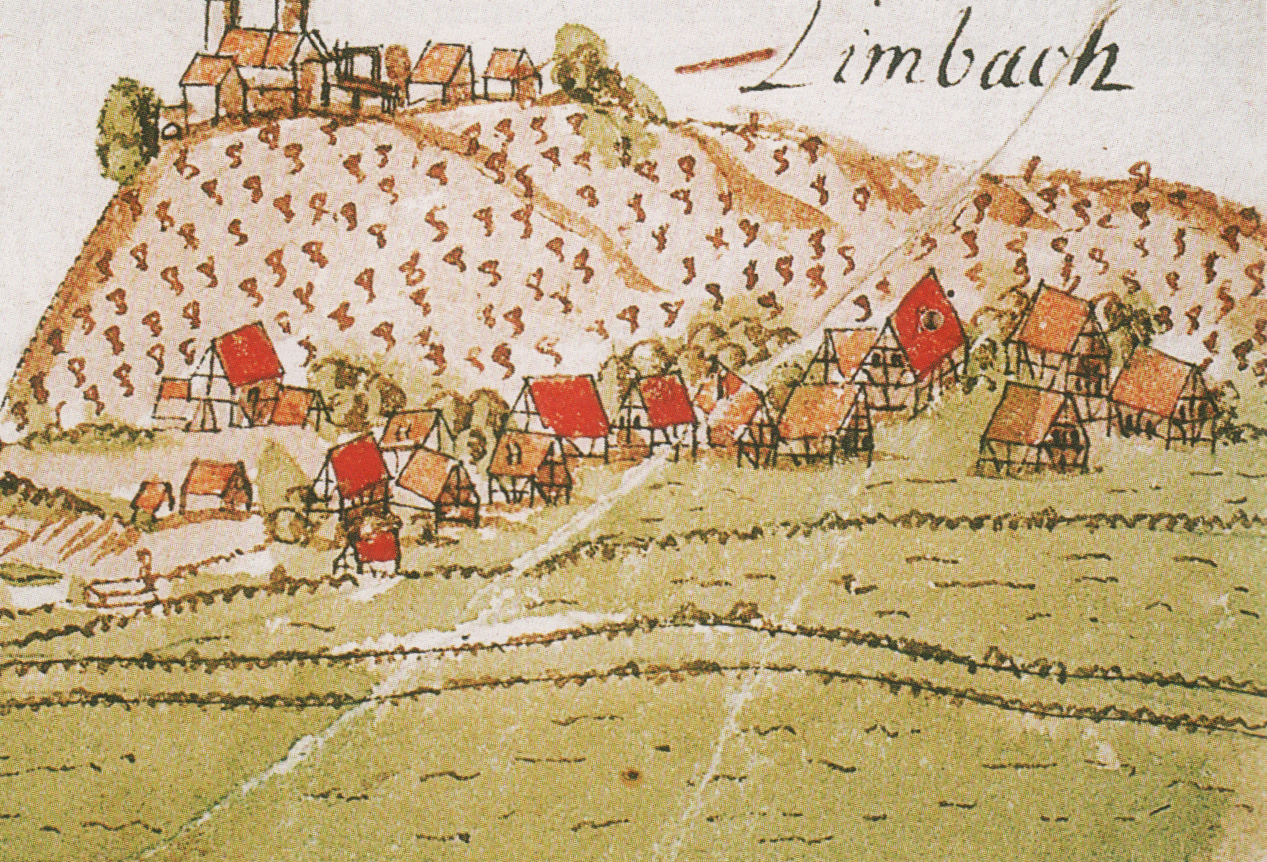
Großbottwar-Lembach in a drawing by Andreas Kieser ca. 1685 (Kiesersche Forstkarte)

Findings from all of the cultural eras support the view that the Großbottwar area has been inhabited continuously since the Stone Age.

The remains of three farms, dated 150–260 CE, of the late Roman period, have been discovered. Around 200 CE, Großbottwar was also the site of a brick factory, referred to as Gaius Longinius Speratus. Bricks formed at this site were stamped with GLSP and examples have been found in Weinsberg and Walheim.

The land, documented as "Boteburon", was included in a grant extending the domain of the Fulda monastery in 779. The interpretation of the name Boteburon is unclear. The former village was situated around the church of St Martin and, when first mentioned, was part of the Duchy of Franconia.

The town of Großbottwar was probably founded in the mid-13th century, very near the former village, and first described as a city in 1279. An alliance of three noble families of the area founded the town, the Swabian family Herren von Heinriet, the Swabian and Austrian family Hoheneck, and the owners of the nearby Lichtenberg Castle, bearing its name. In 1357 the von Lichtenbergs sold the castle, and the related rule, including the town, to Eberhard II, Count of Württemberg.

A school of Latin was established in the town sometime around 1490 and continued teaching until 1925.

In April 1525, Großbottwar became involved in insurgency in the German Peasants' War, when two hundred citizens of the town moved to the Wunnenstein mountain and elected Matern Feuerbacher as their leader in the peasants' revolt. The cluster of peasants joining the rebellion increased rapidly as the group marched, increasing Feuerbacher's responsibility, but the resulting battle at Böblingen on 12 May was a critical loss for the peasants, and one of the bloodiest of the whole uprising. Großbottwar was fined for partaking in the revolt and Feuerbacher was tried for his role as their leader, but he was acquitted and moved to Switzerland. A secondary school in the town is named after him.

== Arts and culture ==
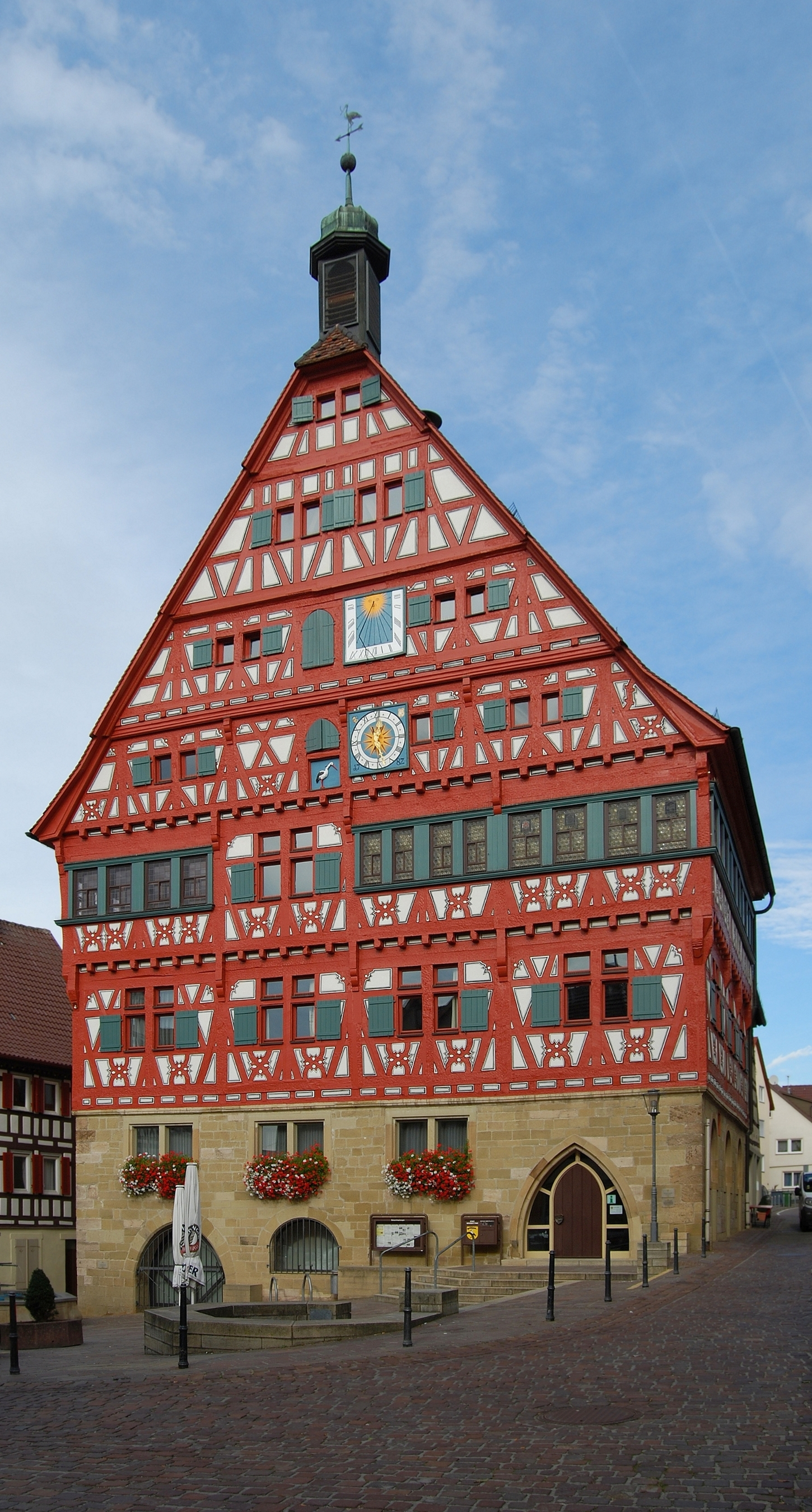
Town hall of Großbottwar, dating from 1556/57 and showing timber framing which has also been preserved in several other houses in the old town.

Großbottwar is situated on the Württemberg Weinstraße, or wine road, a tourist route through the Württemberg wine region. The old town is well preserved, as it has been fortunate to have largely escaped damage from war and fire. Many half-timbered buildings from the 15th to the 17th centuries are still intact, as is some of the original mediaeval wall that once stood around the town, although large sections of it were torn down between 1820 and 1837.

The landmark of the town is the historic Rathaus, or town hall, built in 1553, with gabling completed in 1556. It features elaborate timber framing with a clock, sundial, and carved stork on the façade. The wooden stork is jointed at the neck and nods its head when the clock strikes the hour. The inventor Philipp Matthäus Hahn built the clock in 1776. Originally, the ground floor of the town hall was open and contained the city bakery. The next floor up was a dance workshop and banquet hall, and the floor above was a court room. It is likely that a fountain stood outside the hall since the founding of the town. The fountain was renovated in 1774, but the standing lion put in place was made of sandstone and weathered quickly. The sandstone was replaced in 1873 with cast iron lions. Renovations to the fountain were again needed in 1930, and the lions were replaced by a figure of a sower.

Another fine half-timbered building of the town is Stadtschänke ("City Tavern"), which was probably built in 1434 and features long walls which would have been expensive and complicated to build. Stadtschänke is the oldest half-timbered building in the Ludwigsburg district and houses a restaurant and bed and breakfast business.
