= Steinheim an der Murr =

- Town
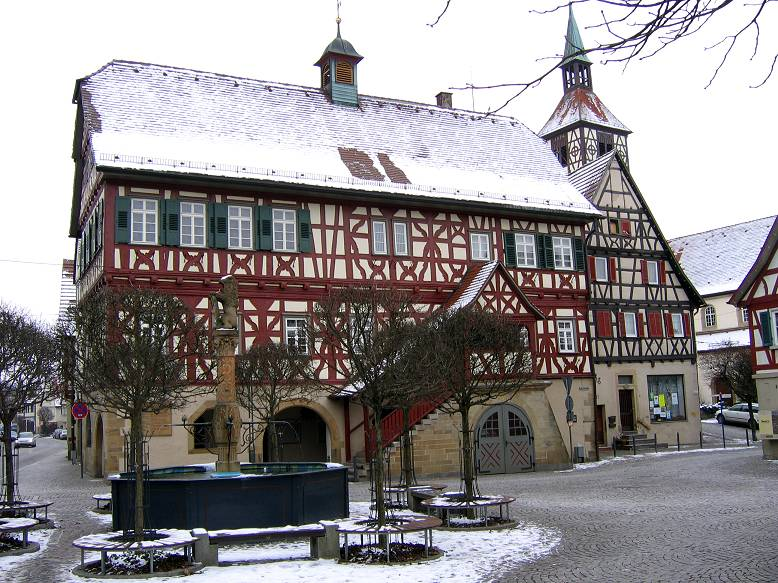
- Town hall

- Coat of arms
- Interactive map of Steinheim an der Murr
- Location within Germany Location within Baden-Württemberg
- Coordinates: 48°58′N 9°17′E
- Country: Germany
- State: Baden-Württemberg
- Admin. region: Stuttgart
- District: Ludwigsburg

Government
  - Mayor (2017–25): Thomas Winterhalter (Ind.)

Area
  - Total: 23.18 km^{2} (8.95 sq mi)
- Elevation: 200 m (660 ft)

Population (2025-12-31)
  - Total: 11,962
  - Density: 516.0/km^{2} (1,337/sq mi)
- Time zone: UTC+01:00 (CET)
  - Summer (DST): UTC+02:00 (CEST)
- Postal codes: 71711
- Dialling codes: 07144
- Vehicle registration: LB
- Website: www.stadt-steinheim.de

Steinheim an der Murr (German pronunciation: [ˈʃtaɪnhaɪm ʔan deːɐ̯ ˈmʊʁ], lit. 'Steinheim on the Murr') is a town in the district of Ludwigsburg, Baden-Württemberg, Germany. It is situated on the river Murr, 9 km northeast of Ludwigsburg.

It is known worldwide for the Steinheim skull, the skull of an early human found there in 1933. This human lived around 250,000 years ago. The original skull is kept in the museum of nature in Stuttgart, while in Steinheim, visitors can see two reproductions of the skull in a small museum.

== Localities ==
- Höpfigheim

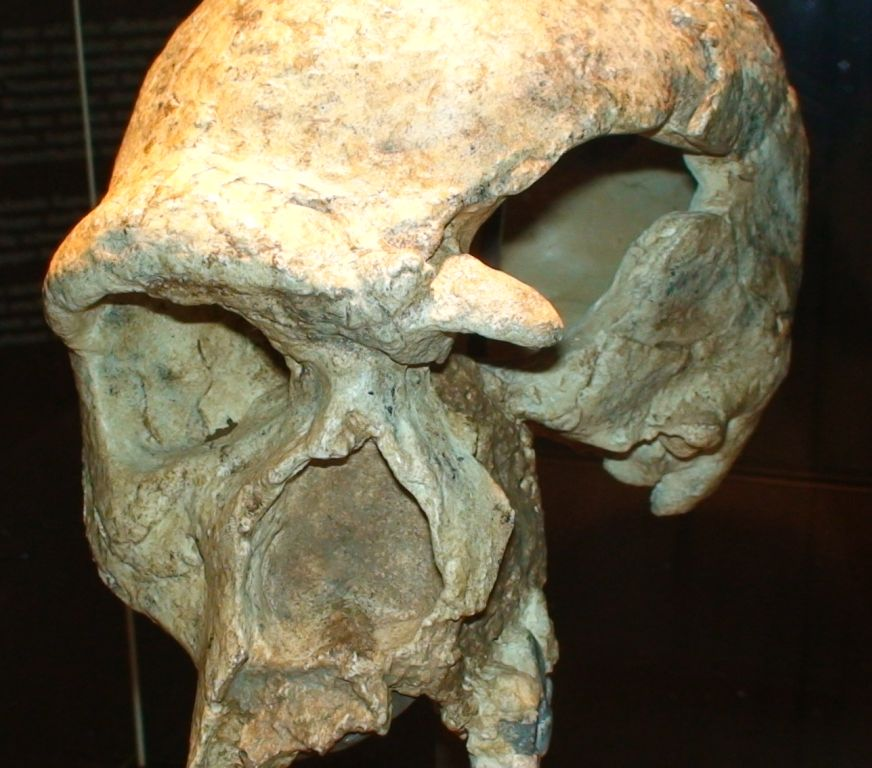
Replica of Steinheim 1

== Notable people ==
Notable people born in Steinheim an der Murr include:

- Philipp Christoph Zeller (1808–1883), entomologist
- Eduard Zeller (1814–1908), born in Kleinbottwar, theologian and philosopher
