= 1968 Baden-Württemberg state election =

State election in Germany

- 28 April 1968

All 127 seats in the Landtag of Baden-Württemberg 64 seats needed for a majority
- Turnout: 3,970,542 (70.75%) ▲3.01%
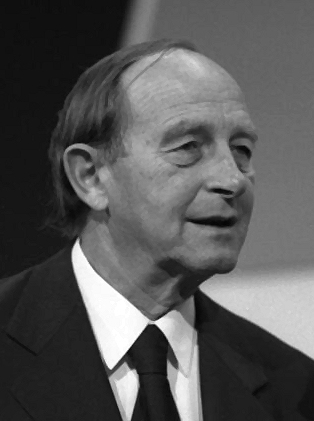

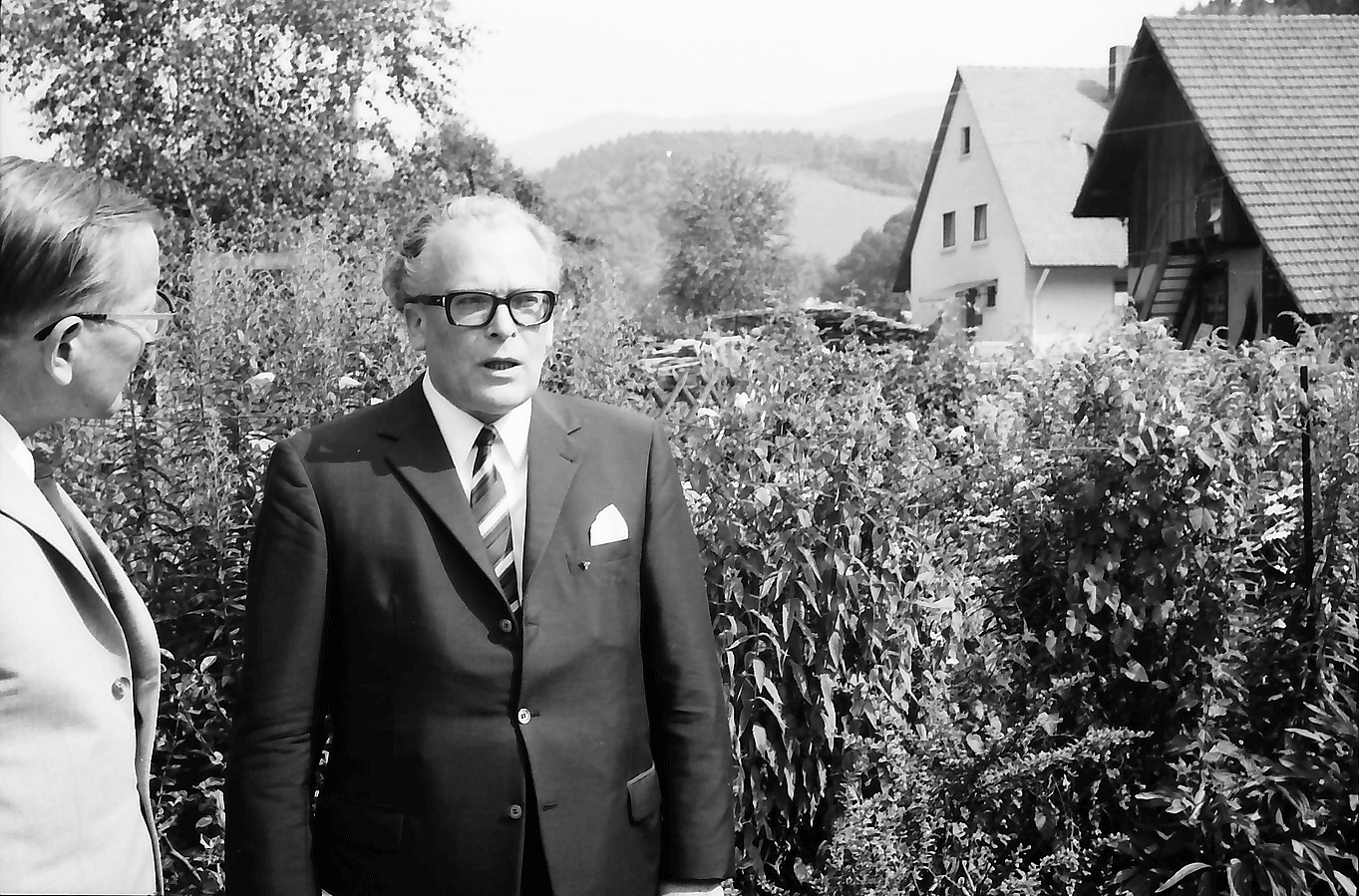
	First party	Second party	Third party
Leader	Hans Filbinger	Walter Krause
Party	CDU	SPD	FDP
Last election	59 seats, 46.18%	47 seats, 37.30%	14 seats, 13.05%
Seats won	60	37	18
Seat change	▲1	▼10	▲4
Popular vote	1,718,261	1,124,696	560,145
Percentage	44.23%	28.95%	14.42%
Swing	▼1.95%	▼8.35%	▲1.37%
	Fourth party
Leader	Wilhelm Gutmann
Party	NPD
Last election	Did not exist
Seats won	12
Seat change	New party
Popular vote	381,569
Percentage	9.42%
Swing	New party
- Results for the single-member constituencies
Minister-President before election
Hans Filbinger
CDU
Elected Minister-President
Hans Filbinger
CDU

The 1968 Baden-Württemberg state election was held on 28 April 1968 to elect the members of the 4th Landtag of Baden-Württemberg. The incumbent Christian Democratic Union (CDU) government under Minister-President Hans Filbinger was re-elected.

== History ==
Following the 1964 Baden-Württemberg state, the Christian Democratic Union had formed a coalition with the Free Democratic Party, with Kurt Georg Kiesinger as Minister-President. On December 1, 1966, Kiesinger became Chancellor of West Germany, and was replaced as Minister-President of Baden-Württemberg by Hans Filbinger. In the same year the governing coalition was dissolved. It was replaced by a grand coalition containing the CDU and the Social Democratic Party.

The election took place shortly after the attempted assassination of Rudi Dutschke on April 11, 1968. The poor performance of the SPD in the election was in part attributed to the protests and riots that broke out after the assassination attempt. The neo-Nazi National Democratic Party of Germany also won almost ten percent of the vote and twelve seats in the Landtag. To date, this is the party's best result in any German state or federal election.

== Parties ==
The table below lists parties represented in the previous Landtag of Baden-Württemberg.

Name		Ideology	Leader(s)	1964 result	
Name		Ideology	Leader(s)	Votes (%)	Seats
CDU	Christian Democratic Union of Germany; Christlich Demokratische Union Deutschlands	Christian democracy	Hans Filbinger	46.18%	59 / 120
SPD	Social Democratic Party of Germany; Sozialdemokratische Partei Deutschlands	Social democracy	Walter Krause	37.30%	47 / 120
FDP	Free Democratic Party; Freie Demokratische Partei	Classical liberalism		13.05%	14 / 120

== Results ==
Summary of the 28 April 1968 election results for the Landtag of Baden-Württemberg
Party	Votes	%	+/-	Seats	+/-	Seats %
Christian Democratic Union (CDU)	1,718,261	44.23	▼1.95	60	▲1	47.24%
Social Democratic Party (SPD)	1,124,696	28.95	▼8.35	37	▼10	29.13%
Free Democratic Party (FDP)	560,145	14.42	▲1.37	18	▲4	14.17%
National Democratic Party of Germany (NPD)	381,569	9.42	New	12	New	9.45
Democratic Left	88,187	2.27	New	0	±0	0
Action Group of Independent Germans	11,030	0.29	New	0	±0	0
Free Social Union	441	0.01	New	0	±0	0
Total	3,884,647	97.84		127	▲7	
Invalid votes	85,895	2.16				
Voter turnout	3,970,542	70.75	▲3.01			
