= Landtag of Baden-Württemberg =

State legislature in Germany

Coordinates: 48°46′43″N 9°11′01″E

Landtag of Baden-Württemberg Landtag von Baden-Württemberg
- 18th Landtag of Baden-Württemberg

Type
- Type: Landtag
- Established: 1952

Leadership
- President of the Landtag: Thomas Strobl, CDU
- Vice President: Muhterem Aras, Greens

Structure
- Seats: 157
- Political groups: Government (112) Greens (56) CDU (56) Opposition (45) AfD (35) SPD (10)

Elections
- Last election: 8 March 2026
- Next election: 2031

Meeting place
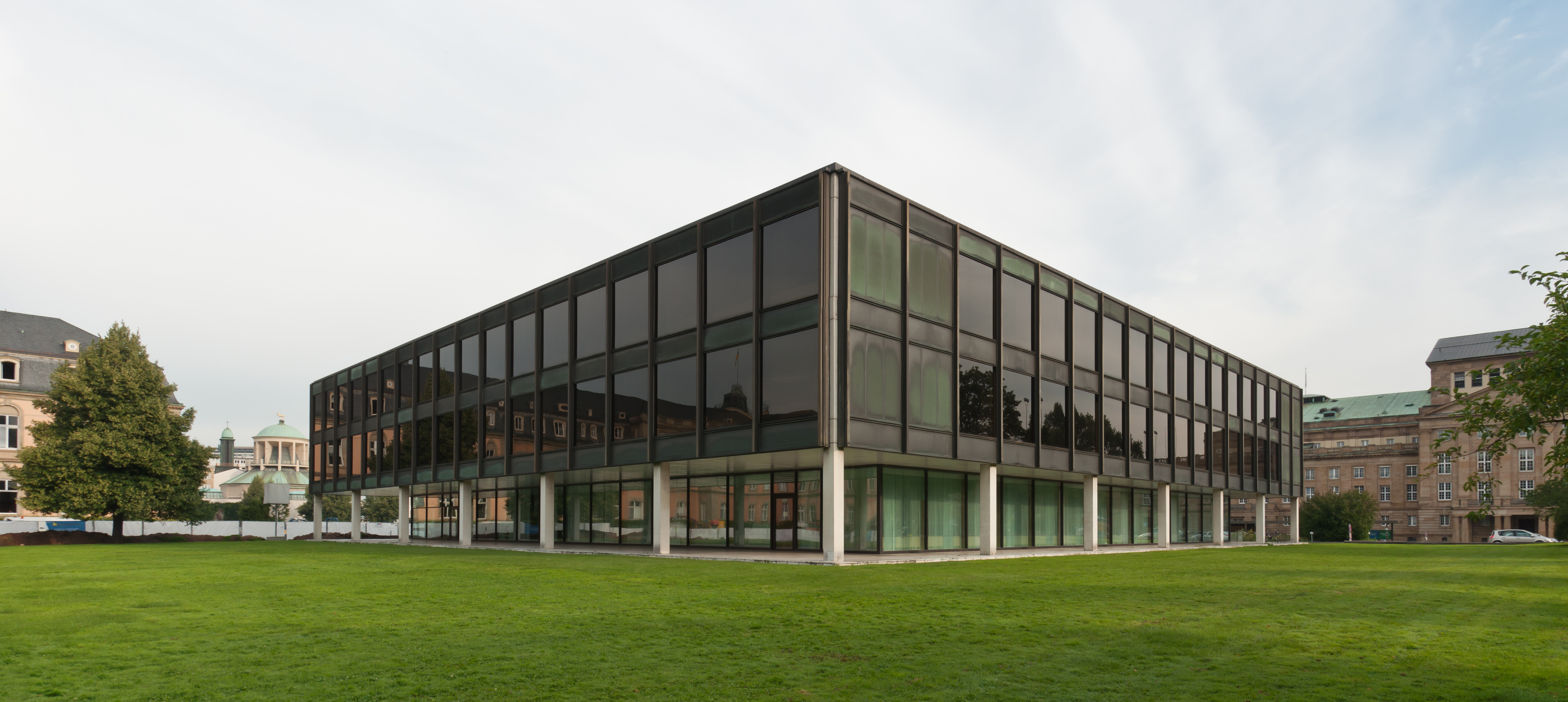
- Stuttgart

The Landtag of Baden-Württemberg is the diet of the German state of Baden-Württemberg. It convenes in Stuttgart and currently consists of 154 members of five political parties. The majority before the 2021 election was a coalition of the Alliance 90/The Greens and the Christian Democratic Union (CDU), supporting the cabinet of Green Minister-President Winfried Kretschmann, who has served since 2011.

== History ==
The Baden-Württemberg State Parliament is rooted in a tradition of democratic predecessors. During the Weimar Republic, these were the State Parliament of the Republic of Baden and the State Parliament of the Free People's State of Württemberg. Following the end of World War II, three states were established in the territory that would later become Baden-Württemberg: Baden, Württemberg-Hohenzollern, and Württemberg-Baden.

The Consultative State Assembly and the State Parliament of Baden convened from 1946 to 1952 in the Historical Merchants' Hall in Freiburg im Breisgau. The Historic Merchants' Hall, a notable Gothic building, served as a significant venue due to its historical and cultural importance in the region. Karl Person served as President of the Baden State Parliament from 1947 to 1951.

The State Parliament of Württemberg-Hohenzollern initially met in 1946 as a Consultative State Assembly in the Bebenhausen Abbey in Tübingen. The choice of the Bebenhausen Monastery, a former Cistercian abbey, reflected the region's historical heritage and its temporary use for governmental functions. Karl Gengler was the President of the Württemberg-Hohenzollern State Parliament from 1947 to 1952.

The Constitutional State Assembly and the State Parliament of Württemberg-Baden held their sessions from 1946 to 1952 in Stuttgart. Stuttgart, as the administrative and economic hub of the region, was a natural choice for these assemblies. The presidents of the Württemberg-Baden State Parliament were Wilhelm Simpfendörfer in 1946 and Wilhelm Keil from 1947 to 1952. From 1947, the sessions took place in the Eduard-Pfeiffer-Haus, built in 1889 by the Workers' Home Foundation, located at Heusteigstrasse 45 in Stuttgart. This building, designed to support workers' welfare, was a fitting symbol of post-war reconstruction efforts. The Baden-Württemberg State Parliament continued to use this building until 1961. After 1961, the State Parliament moved to a new, purpose-built parliament building in Stuttgart, reflecting the growing needs of the unified state.

== Building ==
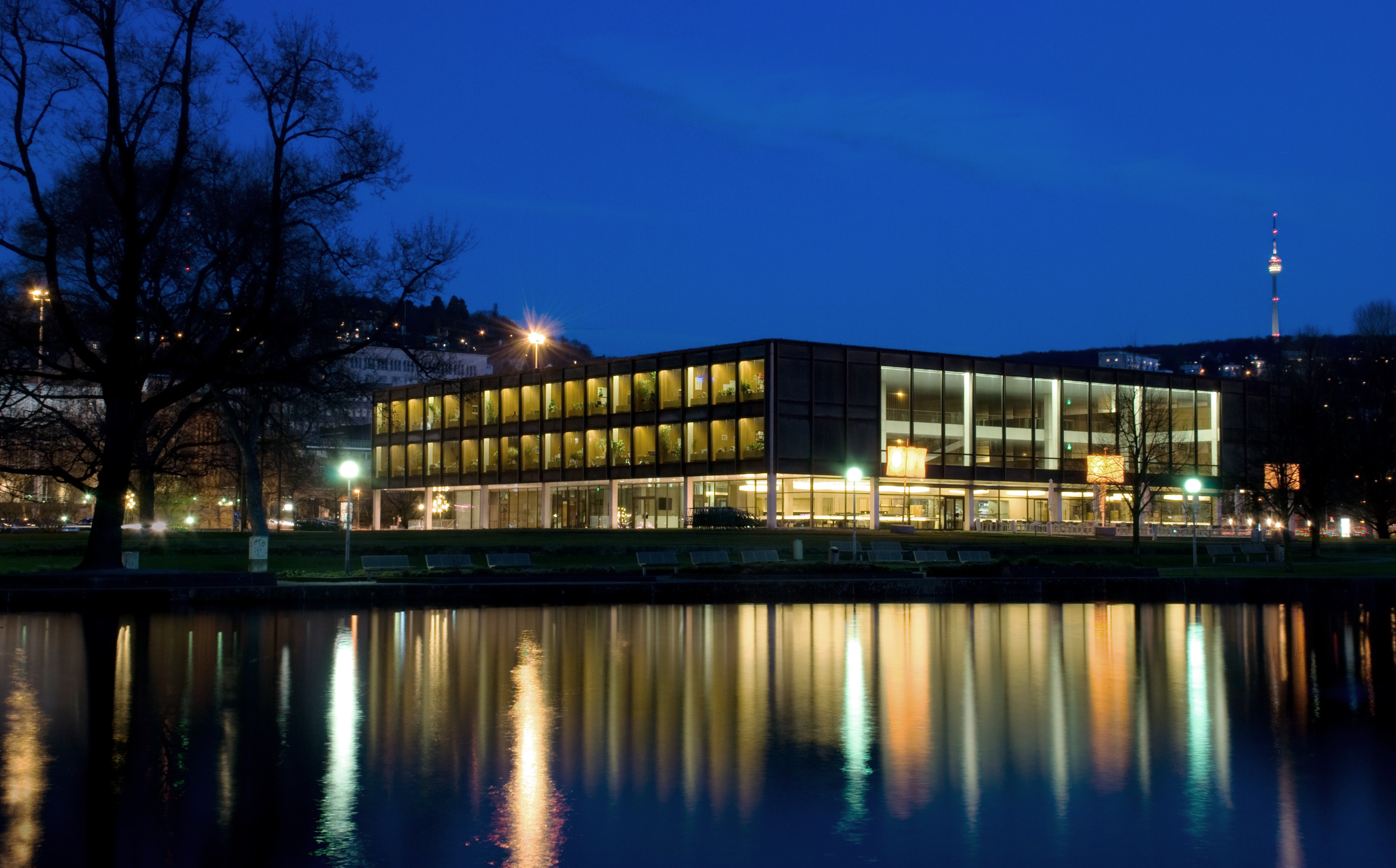
Landtag at night

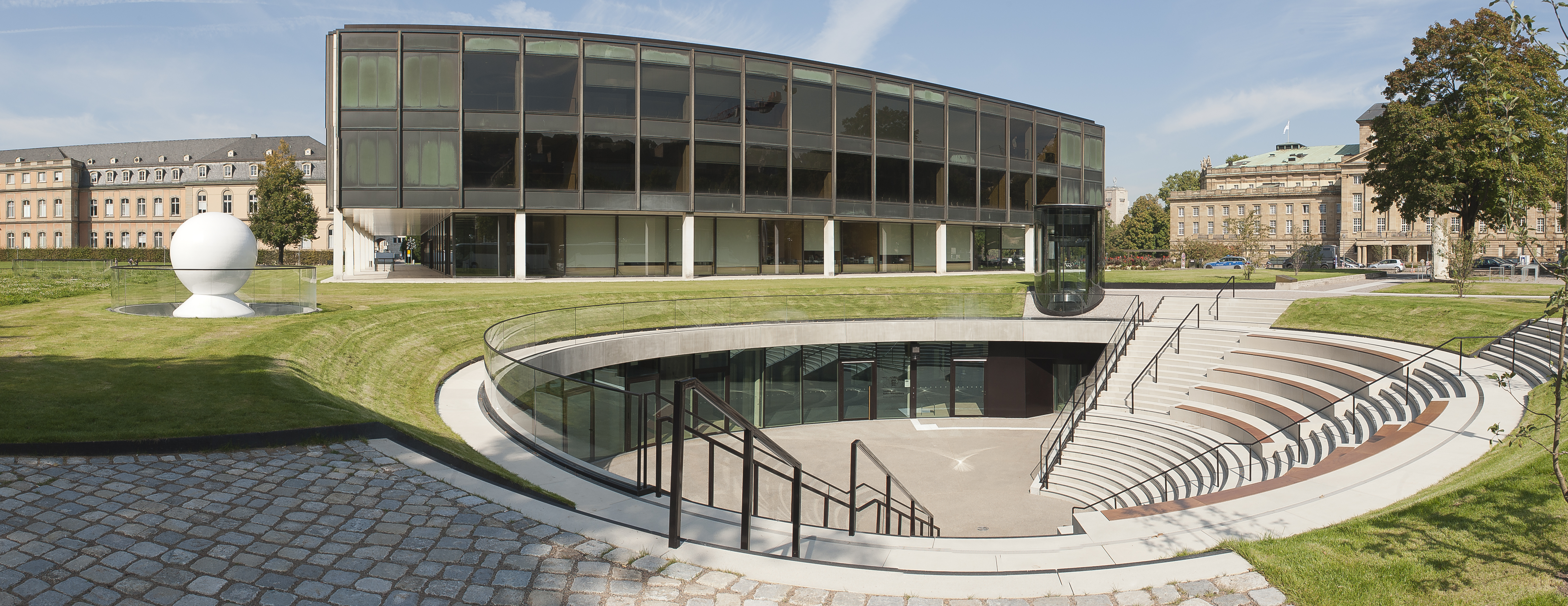
Entrance area

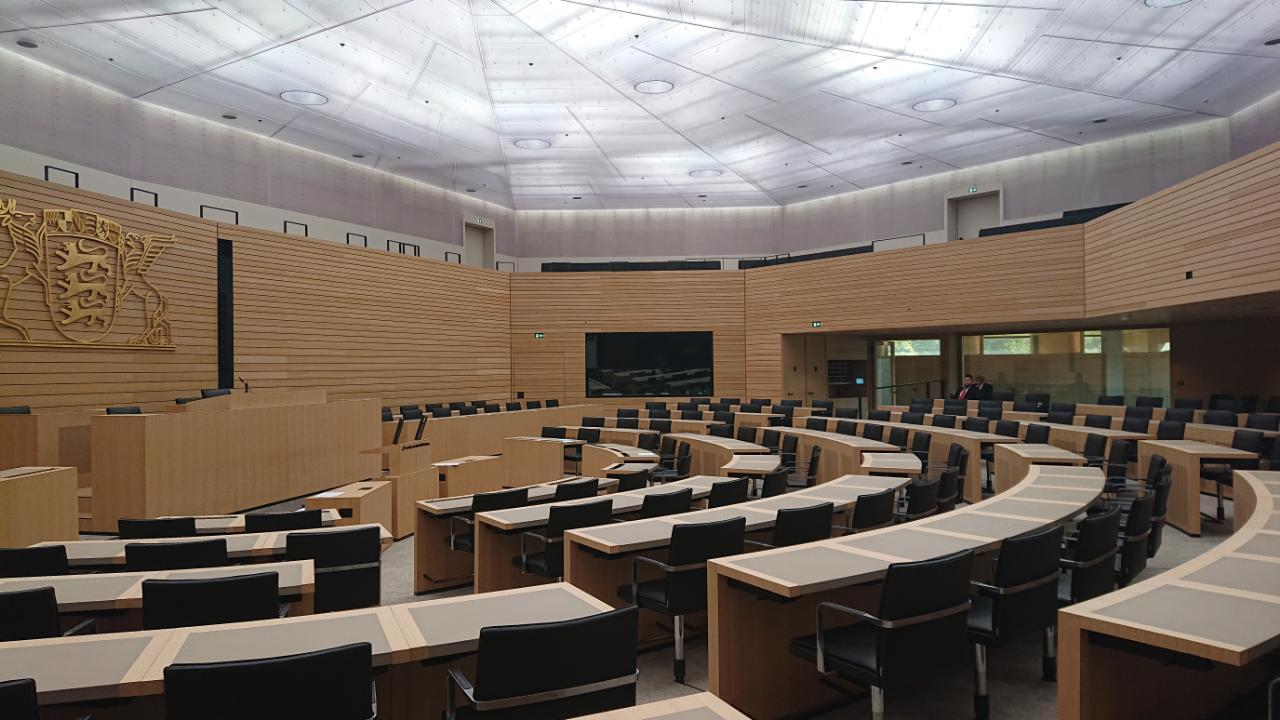
Plenary hall

The facilities of the Baden-Württemberg State Parliament consist of two main structures: the square-shaped Parliament House, completed in 1961 and situated in the upper Schlossgarten, and the House of Representatives, inaugurated in 1987 on the opposite side of Konrad-Adenauer-Strasse. These are linked by an underground pedestrian tunnel for convenient access. The Parliament House holds historical significance as the first purpose-built parliamentary structure in Europe following World War II and is designated as a protected landmark. It was constructed under the direction of architects Erwin Heinle, a Stuttgart-based professor, and Horst Linde, head of the building administration at the time, based on a design by Kurt Viertel from Mainz. Notably, the initial winning proposal by Peter C. von Seidlein and Ulrich Schmidt von Altenstadt was instead implemented in 1964 as a university facility in Tübingen. The interiors of both buildings feature prominent artworks by renowned artists.

From autumn 2013 through spring 2016, the Parliament House underwent a comprehensive modernization and refurbishment by Berlin's Staab Architekten at a cost of 52.1 million euros. The project focused on enhancing energy efficiency, updating technical systems, and redesigning the plenary hall's roof to introduce natural daylight, which had previously been absent. Architect Volker Staab was awarded the Hugo-Häring-Prize in 2018 for this overhaul. During the construction period, parliamentary sessions were relocated to the Kunstgebäude from 25 September 2013, until spring 2016. The inaugural session of the 16th Baden-Württemberg State Parliament took place in the revamped Parliament House on 11 May 2016.

== 17th legislative period ==
Following the Baden-Württemberg state election on 14 March 2021, the initial seat distribution for the 17th legislative period (1 May 2021–30 April 2026) was as follows:

Party	Seats	Direct Mandates	Second Mandates
Alliance 90/The Greens	58 (Note: In December 2024, Ayla Cataltepe switched from the Greens to the CDU, reducing the Greens’ seats to 57 and increasing the CDU’s to 43.)	58	0
Christian Democratic Union (CDU)	42	12	30
Social Democratic Party (SPD)	19 (Note: Daniel Born left the SPD-group to become an independent member, reducing the SPD's seats to 18 and adding one non-attached seat.)	0	19
Free Democratic Party (FDP/DVP)	18	0	18
Alternative for Germany (AfD)	17	0	17

Elections are conducted using a mixed-member proportional representation system, with a minimum of 5% vote share to receive any seats. However, there are some exceptions, making the Baden-Württemberg election system one of the most complicated in Germany.

The minimum size of the Landtag is 120 members, of which 70 members are elected in single-member constituencies with first-past-the-post voting, and 50 are pulled from the party lists according to the principle of proportional representation. Overhang and levelling seats may be added.

The main difference in their electoral system compared to the federal Bundestag is that there are no list members, making all members local. Proportionality is maintained by parties awarding remaining seats to candidates within a party who didn't win a geographic district (a Zweitmandat, or "second mandate") ordered by most to least popular (e.g. a candidate losing with 47% of the vote would be placed ahead of a candidate losing with 20% of votes in their district).

This does mean that a candidate who placed second within their district isn't guaranteed a seat, if other losers in their party were more popular and if their party only needs a small number of seats to maintain proportionality.

== Presidents of the Landtag ==
So far, the presidents of the Landtag of Baden-Württemberg have been:

- 1952–1960 Carl Neinhaus, Christian Democratic Union (CDU)
- 1960–1968 Franz Gurk, CDU
- 1968–1976 Camill Wurz, CDU
- 1976–1980 Erich Ganzenmüller, CDU
- 1980–1982 Lothar Gaa, CDU
- 1982–1992 Erich Schneider, CDU
- 1992–1996 Fritz Hopmeier, CDU
- 1996–2011 Peter Straub, CDU
- 2011 Willi Stächele, CDU
- 2011–2015 Guido Wolf, CDU
- 2015-2016 Wilfried Klenk, CDU
- 2016–2026 Muhterem Aras, Alliance 90/The Greens
- 2026–present Thomas Strobl, CDU

In the 17th legislative period, there are two vice presidents, after the parliament had only one vice president in the 16th legislative period.

== Historical composition ==
1st Landtag, following 1952 election

2nd Landtag, following 1958 election

3rd Landtag, following 1960 election

4th Landtag, following 1964 election

5th Landtag, following 1968 election

6th Landtag, following 1972 election

7th Landtag, following 1976 election

8th Landtag, following 1980 election

9th Landtag, following 1984 election

10th Landtag, following 1988 election

11th Landtag, following 1992 election

12th Landtag, following 1996 election

13th Landtag, following 2001 election

14th Landtag, following 2006 election

15th Landtag, following 2011 election

16th Landtag, following 2016 election

17th Landtag, following 2021 election

18th Landtag, following 2026 election

== See also ==
- 2021 Baden-Württemberg state election
- 2026 Baden-Württemberg state election
- Baden Landtag elections in the Weimar Republic (1919–1929)
- Württemberg Landtag elections in the Weimar Republic (1919–1932)
