= Ludwigsburg (Bundestag electoral district) =

Federal electoral district of Germany

265 Ludwigsburg
- Electoral district for the Bundestag
- Ludwigsburg in 2025
- State: Baden-Württemberg
- Population: 330,400 (2019)
- Electorate: 215,312 (2021)
- Major settlements: Ludwigsburg; Kornwestheim; Vaihingen an der Enz
- Area: 361.4 km^{2}

Current electoral district
- Created: 1949
- Party: CDU
- Member: Steffen Bilger
- Elected: 2009, 2013, 2017, 2021, 2025

Ludwigsburg is an electoral constituency (German: Wahlkreis) represented in the Bundestag. It elects one member via first-past-the-post voting. Under the current constituency numbering system, it is designated as constituency 265. It is located in central Baden-Württemberg, comprising the southern part of the Ludwigsburg district.

Ludwigsburg was created for the inaugural 1949 federal election. Since 2009, it has been represented by Steffen Bilger of the Christian Democratic Union (CDU).

== Geography ==
Ludwigsburg is located in central Baden-Württemberg. As of the 2021 federal election, it comprises the municipalities of Asperg, Ditzingen, Eberdingen, Gerlingen, Hemmingen, Korntal-Münchingen, Kornwestheim, Ludwigsburg, Markgröningen, Möglingen, Oberriexingen, Remseck am Neckar, Schwieberdingen, Sersheim, and Vaihingen an der Enz from the Ludwigsburg district, as well as the municipality of Weissach from the Böblingen district.

== History ==
Ludwigsburg was created in 1949. In the 1949 election, it was Württemberg-Baden Landesbezirk Württemberg constituency 3 in the numbering system. In the 1953 through 1961 elections, it was number 165. In the 1965 through 1976 elections, it was number 167. In the 1980 through 1998 elections, it was number 169. In the 2002 and 2005 elections, it was number 266. Since the 2009 election, it has been number 265.

Originally, the constituency was coterminous with the Ludwigsburg district. In the 1976 election, it comprised the northern part of the Ludwigsburg district. In the 1980 election, it acquired a configuration very similar to its current borders, but lacking the Weissach municipality from the Böblingen district. It acquired the Weissach municipality in the 2017 election.

Election	No.	Name	Borders
1949	3	Ludwigsburg	Ludwigsburg district
1953	165	Ludwigsburg	Ludwigsburg district
1957	165	Ludwigsburg	Ludwigsburg district
1961	165	Ludwigsburg	Ludwigsburg district
1965	167	Ludwigsburg	Ludwigsburg district
1969	167	Ludwigsburg	Ludwigsburg district
1972	167	Ludwigsburg	Ludwigsburg district
1976	167	Ludwigsburg	Ludwigsburg district (only northern parts)
1980	169	Ludwigsburg	Ludwigsburg district (only Asperg, Ditzingen, Eberdingen, Gerlingen, Hemmingen, Korntal-Münchingen, Kornwestheim, Ludwigsburg, Markgröningen, Möglingen, Oberriexingen, Remseck am Neckar, Schwieberdingen, Sersheim, and Vaihingen an der Enz municipalities)
1983	169	Ludwigsburg	Ludwigsburg district (only Asperg, Ditzingen, Eberdingen, Gerlingen, Hemmingen, Korntal-Münchingen, Kornwestheim, Ludwigsburg, Markgröningen, Möglingen, Oberriexingen, Remseck am Neckar, Schwieberdingen, Sersheim, and Vaihingen an der Enz municipalities)
1987	169	Ludwigsburg	Ludwigsburg district (only Asperg, Ditzingen, Eberdingen, Gerlingen, Hemmingen, Korntal-Münchingen, Kornwestheim, Ludwigsburg, Markgröningen, Möglingen, Oberriexingen, Remseck am Neckar, Schwieberdingen, Sersheim, and Vaihingen an der Enz municipalities)
1990	169	Ludwigsburg	Ludwigsburg district (only Asperg, Ditzingen, Eberdingen, Gerlingen, Hemmingen, Korntal-Münchingen, Kornwestheim, Ludwigsburg, Markgröningen, Möglingen, Oberriexingen, Remseck am Neckar, Schwieberdingen, Sersheim, and Vaihingen an der Enz municipalities)
1994	169	Ludwigsburg	Ludwigsburg district (only Asperg, Ditzingen, Eberdingen, Gerlingen, Hemmingen, Korntal-Münchingen, Kornwestheim, Ludwigsburg, Markgröningen, Möglingen, Oberriexingen, Remseck am Neckar, Schwieberdingen, Sersheim, and Vaihingen an der Enz municipalities)
1998	169	Ludwigsburg	Ludwigsburg district (only Asperg, Ditzingen, Eberdingen, Gerlingen, Hemmingen, Korntal-Münchingen, Kornwestheim, Ludwigsburg, Markgröningen, Möglingen, Oberriexingen, Remseck am Neckar, Schwieberdingen, Sersheim, and Vaihingen an der Enz municipalities)
2002	266	Ludwigsburg	Ludwigsburg district (only Asperg, Ditzingen, Eberdingen, Gerlingen, Hemmingen, Korntal-Münchingen, Kornwestheim, Ludwigsburg, Markgröningen, Möglingen, Oberriexingen, Remseck am Neckar, Schwieberdingen, Sersheim, and Vaihingen an der Enz municipalities)
2005	266	Ludwigsburg	Ludwigsburg district (only Asperg, Ditzingen, Eberdingen, Gerlingen, Hemmingen, Korntal-Münchingen, Kornwestheim, Ludwigsburg, Markgröningen, Möglingen, Oberriexingen, Remseck am Neckar, Schwieberdingen, Sersheim, and Vaihingen an der Enz municipalities)
2009	265	Ludwigsburg	Ludwigsburg district (only Asperg, Ditzingen, Eberdingen, Gerlingen, Hemmingen, Korntal-Münchingen, Kornwestheim, Ludwigsburg, Markgröningen, Möglingen, Oberriexingen, Remseck am Neckar, Schwieberdingen, Sersheim, and Vaihingen an der Enz municipalities)
2013	265	Ludwigsburg	Ludwigsburg district (only Asperg, Ditzingen, Eberdingen, Gerlingen, Hemmingen, Korntal-Münchingen, Kornwestheim, Ludwigsburg, Markgröningen, Möglingen, Oberriexingen, Remseck am Neckar, Schwieberdingen, Sersheim, and Vaihingen an der Enz municipalities)
2017	265	Ludwigsburg	Ludwigsburg district (only Asperg, Ditzingen, Eberdingen, Gerlingen, Hemmingen, Korntal-Münchingen, Kornwestheim, Ludwigsburg, Markgröningen, Möglingen, Oberriexingen, Remseck am Neckar, Schwieberdingen, Sersheim, and Vaihingen an der Enz municipalities); Böblingen district (only Weissach municipality)
2021	265	Ludwigsburg	Ludwigsburg district (only Asperg, Ditzingen, Eberdingen, Gerlingen, Hemmingen, Korntal-Münchingen, Kornwestheim, Ludwigsburg, Markgröningen, Möglingen, Oberriexingen, Remseck am Neckar, Schwieberdingen, Sersheim, and Vaihingen an der Enz municipalities); Böblingen district (only Weissach municipality)
2025	265	Ludwigsburg	Ludwigsburg district (only Asperg, Ditzingen, Eberdingen, Gerlingen, Hemmingen, Korntal-Münchingen, Kornwestheim, Ludwigsburg, Markgröningen, Möglingen, Oberriexingen, Remseck am Neckar, Schwieberdingen, Sersheim, and Vaihingen an der Enz municipalities); Böblingen district (only Weissach municipality)

== Members ==
The constituency was first represented by Willi Lausen of the Social Democratic Party (SPD) from 1949 to 1953, followed by fellow SPD member Karl Mommer from 1953 to 1957. Raban Adelmann of the Christian Democratic Union (CDU) won it in 1957 and served one term before former member Mommer was re-elected in 1961. He served until 1969, when Annemarie Griesinger of the CDU was elected. Gunter Huonker of the SPD was then elected in 1972 for one term. Matthias Wissmann of the CDU was representative from 1976 to 2009, a total of nine consecutive terms. Steffen Bilger was elected in 2009, and re-elected in 2013, 2017, and 2021.

Election	Member	Party	%
1949	Willi Lausen	SPD	26.7
1953	Karl Mommer	SPD	28.8
1957	Raban Adelmann	CDU	42.5
1961	Karl Mommer	SPD	41.4
1965	Karl Mommer	SPD	42.1
1969	Annemarie Griesinger	CDU	43.2
1972	Gunter Huonker	SPD	48.1
1976	Matthias Wissmann	CDU	48.7
1980	Matthias Wissmann	CDU	48.3
1983	Matthias Wissmann	CDU	55.5
1987	Matthias Wissmann	CDU	50.8
1990	Matthias Wissmann	CDU	48.5
1994	Matthias Wissmann	CDU	49.4
1998	Matthias Wissmann	CDU	44.3
2002	Matthias Wissmann	CDU	45.2
2005	Matthias Wissmann	CDU	45.2
2009	Steffen Bilger	CDU	39.9
2013	Steffen Bilger	CDU	50.4
2017	Steffen Bilger	CDU	38.3
2021	Steffen Bilger	CDU	29.5
2025	Steffen Bilger	CDU	36.5

== Election results ==
=== 2025 election ===
Federal election (2025): Ludwigsburg
Notes:	Blue background denotes the winner of the electorate vote. Pink background denotes a candidate elected from their party list. Yellow background denotes an electorate win by a list member, or other incumbent. A ✓ or ✗ denotes status of any incumbent, win or lose respectively.						
Party	Candidate	Votes	%	±%	Party votes	%	±%
CDU	✓ Steffen Bilger	65,151	36.5	▲7.0	57,281	32.0	▲7.3
Greens	Sandra Detzer	28,624	16.0	▼4.3	26,602	14.9	▼3.5
SPD	Macit Karaahmetoǧlu	27,089	15.2	▼3.2	27,022	15.1	▼6.7
FDP	Oliver Martin	9,136	5.1	▼8.9	11,448	6.4	▼9.8
AfD	Martin Hess	30,109	16.9	▲8.3	30,184	16.9	▲8.5
Left	Nadja Schmidt	11,130	6.2	▲3.4	12,277	6.9	▲3.8
FW	Martin Pfaff	3,803	2.2	▲0.1	2,765	1.6	▲0.8
dieBasis	Stephan Johne	1,458	0.8	▼0.9	645	0.4	▼1.1
Tierschutzpartei					1,310	0.7	▼0.3
PARTEI				▼1.2	704	0.4	▼0.5
Team Todenhöfer							▼0.7
Pirates							▼0.4
ÖDP	Guido Klamt	800	0.4	▼0.1	359	0.2	▼0.1
Volt	Joaquin Ballesteros	1,765	1.0	▲0.6	1,312	0.7	▲0.4
Bündnis C					228	0.1	Steady
Bürgerbewegung							▼0.4
Humanists							▼0.1
BD					169	0.1	
Gesundheitsforschung							▼0.1
BSW					7,075	4.0	
MLPD					60	0.0	0.0
Informal votes		1,138			773		
Total valid votes		178,426			178,791		
Turnout		179,554	84.5	▲4.7			
CDU hold	Majority			▲7.0			

=== 2021 election ===
Federal election (2021): Ludwigsburg
Notes:	Blue background denotes the winner of the electorate vote. Pink background denotes a candidate elected from their party list. Yellow background denotes an electorate win by a list member, or other incumbent. A ✓ or ✗ denotes status of any incumbent, win or lose respectively.						
Party	Candidate	Votes	%	±%	Party votes	%	±%
CDU	✓ Steffen Bilger	50,297	29.5	▼8.8	42,297	24.8	▼8.6
Greens	Sandra Detzer	34,663	20.3	▲6.1	31,433	18.4	▲4.6
SPD	Macit Karaahmetoǧlu	31,409	18.4	▲0.6	37,284	21.8	▲5.4
FDP	Oliver Martin	23,891	14.0	▲3.8	27,611	16.2	▲1.5
AfD	Martin Hess	14,392	8.4	▼3.2	14,313	8.4	▼3.0
Left	Andreas Frisch	4,886	2.9	▼2.6	5,275	3.1	▼2.9
FW	Martin Pfaff	3,803	2.2	▲0.1	2,765	1.6	▲0.8
dieBasis	Stephan Johne	2,960	1.7		2,514	1.5	
Tierschutzpartei					1,743	1.0	▲0.3
PARTEI	Emanuele Annunziata	2,114	1.2		1,462	0.9	▲0.1
Team Todenhöfer					1,120	0.7	
Pirates					615	0.4	▼0.1
ÖDP	Michael Dornhausen	929	0.5		554	0.3	0.0
Volt	Jördis Hollnagel	684	0.4		526	0.3	
Bündnis C					293	0.2	
Independent	Jakob Novotny	291	0.2				
Bürgerbewegung					241	0.1	
Independent	David Gibanica	224	0.1				
Humanists					183	0.1	
DiB					149	0.1	▼0.1
Gesundheitsforschung					136	0.1	
NPD					120	0.1	▼0.1
MLPD					82	0.0	▼0.1
Bündnis 21					51	0.0	
LKR					45	0.0	
DKP					30	0.0	0.0
Informal votes		1,300			1,001		
Total valid votes		170,543			170,842		
Turnout		171,843	79.8	▼0.6			
CDU hold	Majority	15,634	9.2	▼11.3			

=== 2017 election ===
Federal election (2017): Ludwigsburg
Notes:	Blue background denotes the winner of the electorate vote. Pink background denotes a candidate elected from their party list. Yellow background denotes an electorate win by a list member, or other incumbent. A ✓ or ✗ denotes status of any incumbent, win or lose respectively.						
Party	Candidate	Votes	%	±%	Party votes	%	±%
CDU	✓ Steffen Bilger	66,430	38.3	▼12.3	58,003	33.3	▼10.8
SPD	Macit Karaahmetoğlu	30,971	17.8	▼3.3	28,547	16.4	▼4.8
Greens	Ingrid Hönlinger	24,702	14.2	▲0.8	24,000	13.8	▲2.1
AfD	Martin Hess	20,157	11.6		19,780	11.4	▲6.3
FDP	Stefanie Knecht	17,691	10.2	▲7.0	25,538	14.7	▲7.8
Left	Peter Schimke	9,487	5.5	▲0.7	10,451	6.0	▲1.3
FW	Günther Frölich	3,644	2.1	0.0	1,503	0.9	0.0
Tierschutzpartei					1,274	0.7	0.0
PARTEI					1,229	0.7	
Pirates					882	0.5	▼1.7
ÖDP					522	0.3	0.0
Tierschutzallianz					410	0.2	
NPD					333	0.2	▼0.6
BGE					276	0.2	
DM					266	0.2	
DiB					256	0.1	
V-Partei³					247	0.1	
MLPD	Erkan Karakaplan	453	0.3	▲0.3	223	0.1	▲0.1
Menschliche Welt					182	0.1	
DIE RECHTE					42	0.0	
DKP					23	0.0	
Informal votes		1,769			1,317		
Total valid votes		173,535			173,987		
Turnout		175,304	80.4	▲2.7			
CDU hold	Majority	35,459	20.5	▼8.7			

=== 2013 election ===
Federal election (2013): Ludwigsburg
Notes:	Blue background denotes the winner of the electorate vote. Pink background denotes a candidate elected from their party list. Yellow background denotes an electorate win by a list member, or other incumbent. A ✓ or ✗ denotes status of any incumbent, win or lose respectively.						
Party	Candidate	Votes	%	±%	Party votes	%	±%
CDU	✓ Steffen Bilger	80,935	50.4	▲10.5	70,982	44.0	▲11.4
SPD	Macit Karaahmetoğlu	33,977	21.2	▼1.4	34,338	21.3	▲1.1
Greens	Ingrid Hönlinger	21,666	13.5	▼2.1	18,842	11.7	▼3.3
Left	Peter Schimke	7,739	4.8	▼1.6	7,594	4.7	▼2.0
FDP	Alexander Deicke	5,126	3.2	▼9.5	11,140	6.9	▼12.7
AfD					8,247	5.1	
Pirates	Thomas Lambeck	4,349	2.7		3,567	2.2	▲0.3
FW	Günther Frölich	3,373	2.1		1,380	0.9	
NPD	Klemens Lockfisch	2,251	1.4	▼0.2	1,359	0.8	▼0.2
Tierschutzpartei					1,102	0.7	▲0.1
REP					563	0.3	▼0.7
ÖDP	Michael Dornhausen	1,145	0.7	▲0.1	557	0.3	▼0.1
RENTNER					507	0.3	
PBC					334	0.2	▼0.2
Volksabstimmung					202	0.1	0.0
PRO					142	0.1	
BIG					138	0.1	
Party of Reason					136	0.1	
MLPD					120	0.1	0.0
BüSo					21	0.0	0.0
Informal votes		2,254			1,544		
Total valid votes		160,561			161,271		
Turnout		162,815	77.5	▲2.1			
CDU hold	Majority	46,958	29.2	▲11.9			

=== 2009 election ===
Federal election (2009): Ludwigsburg
Notes:	Blue background denotes the winner of the electorate vote. Pink background denotes a candidate elected from their party list. Yellow background denotes an electorate win by a list member, or other incumbent. A ✓ or ✗ denotes status of any incumbent, win or lose respectively.						
Party	Candidate	Votes	%	±%	Party votes	%	±%
CDU	Steffen Bilger	61,328	39.9	▼6.4	50,274	32.6	▼3.8
SPD	Jan Mönikes	34,718	22.6	▼11.8	31,079	20.2	▼11.8
Greens	Ingrid Hönlinger	23,966	15.6	▲6.9	23,090	15.0	▲4.0
FDP	Alexander Schopf	19,431	12.6	▲8.0	30,179	19.6	▲6.7
Left	Hans-Jürgen Kemmerle	9,800	6.4	▲3.2	10,382	6.7	▲3.2
Pirates					2,995	1.9	
REP					1,548	1.0	▼0.1
NPD	Heiko Köhler	2,436	1.6	▲0.1	1,538	1.0	0.0
Tierschutzpartei					943	0.6	
PBC	Hans-Dieter Völlm	971	0.6		608	0.4	▼0.1
ÖDP	Guido Klamt	963	0.6		628	0.4	
DIE VIOLETTEN					360	0.2	
Volksabstimmung					245	0.2	
MLPD					109	0.1	0.0
DVU					70	0.0	
BüSo					64	0.0	0.0
ADM					59	0.0	
Informal votes		2,440			1,822		
Total valid votes		153,613			154,171		
Turnout		156,053	75.5	▼5.8			
CDU hold	Majority	26,610	17.3	▲5.4			

=== 2005 election ===
Federal election (2005): Ludwigsburg
Notes:	Blue background denotes the winner of the electorate vote. Pink background denotes a candidate elected from their party list. Yellow background denotes an electorate win by a list member, or other incumbent. A ✓ or ✗ denotes status of any incumbent, win or lose respectively.						
Party	Candidate	Votes	%	±%	Party votes	%	±%
CDU	✓ Matthias Wissmann	75,355	46.3	▲1.1	59,291	36.4	▼3.1
SPD	Jan Mönikes	55,972	34.4	▼7.1	52,063	32.0	▼3.2
Greens	Ingrid Hönlinger	14,228	8.7	▲3.7	17,956	11.0	▼1.3
FDP	Tobias Roese	7,499	4.6	▼0.9	21,054	12.9	▲4.5
Left	Hans-Jürgen Kemmerle	5,168	3.2	▲2.1	5,829	3.6	▲2.6
NPD	Heiko Köhler	2,346	1.4		1,670	1.0	▲0.8
GRAUEN	Ursula Linn	2,105	1.3	▲0.4	1,332	0.8	▲0.5
REP					1,783	1.1	▼0.2
Familie					910	0.6	
PBC					794	0.5	0.0
MLPD					156	0.1	
BüSo					97	0.1	
Informal votes		2,497			2,235		
Total valid votes		162,673			162,935		
Turnout		165,170	81.3	▼2.2			
CDU hold	Majority	19,383	11.9				
