= Vaihingen (electoral district) =

State electoral district of Germany

13: Vaihingen
- Electoral district for the Landtag of Baden-Württemberg
- Vaihingen in 2026
- District: Ludwigsburg
- Electorate: 115,702 (2026)
- Major settlements: Bönnigheim, Ditzingen, Eberdingen, Gerlingen, Hemmingen, Korntal-Münchingen, Markgröningen, Oberriexingen, Sachsenheim, Schwieberdingen, Sersheim, and Vaihingen an der Enz

Current electoral district
- Party: CDU
- Member: Konrad Epple

Vaihingen is an electoral constituency (German: Wahlkreis) represented in the Landtag of Baden-Württemberg. Since 2026, it has elected one member via first-past-the-post voting. Voters cast a second vote under which additional seats are allocated proportionally state-wide. Under the constituency numbering system, it is designated as constituency 13. It is wholly within the district of Ludwigsburg.

== Geography ==
The constituency includes the municipalities of Bönnigheim, Ditzingen, Eberdingen, Gerlingen, Hemmingen, Korntal-Münchingen, Markgröningen, Oberriexingen, Sachsenheim, Schwieberdingen, Sersheim, and Vaihingen an der Enz, within the district of Ludwigsburg.

There were 115,702 eligible voters in 2026.

== Members ==
=== First mandate ===
Both prior to and since the electoral reforms for the 2026 election, the winner of the plurality of the vote (first-past-the-post) in every constituency won the first mandate.

Election	Member	Party	%
1976	Annemarie Griesinger	CDU	
1980	Annemarie Griesinger	CDU	
1984	Günther Oettinger	CDU	
1988	Günther Oettinger	CDU	
1992	Günther Oettinger	CDU	
1996	Günther Oettinger	CDU	
2001	Günther Oettinger	CDU	
2006	Günther Oettinger	CDU	45.0
Feb 2010	Albrecht Fischer	CDU	45.0
2011	Konrad Epple	CDU	38.8
2016	Markus Rösler	Grüne	33.1
2021	Markus Rösler	Grüne	34.9
2026	Konrad Epple	CDU	36.6

=== Second mandate ===
Prior to the electoral reforms for the 2026 election, the seats in the state parliament were allocated proportionately amongst parties which received more than 5% of valid votes across the state. The seats that were won proportionally for parties that did not win as many first mandates as seats they were entitled to, were allocated to their candidates which received the highest proportion of the vote in their respective constituencies. This meant that following some elections, a constituency would have one or more members elected under a second mandate.

Prior to 2011, these second mandates were allocated to the party candidates who got the greatest number of votes, whilst from 2011-2021, these were allocated according to percentage share of the vote.

There were no second mandate members elected prior to 2006.

Election	Member	Party
2006	Wolfgang Stehmer	SPD
2011	Markus Rösler	Grüne
2016	Konrad Epple	CDU
2021	Konrad Epple	CDU

== Election results ==
=== 2026 election ===
State election (2026): Vaihingen
Notes:	Blue background denotes the winner of the electorate vote. Pink background denotes a candidate elected from their party list. Yellow background denotes an electorate win by a list member, or other incumbent. A ✓ or ✗ denotes status of any incumbent, win or lose respectively.						
Party	Candidate	Votes	%	±%	Party votes	%	±%
CDU	Konrad Epple	31,016	36.6	▲11.8	26,776	31.4	▲6.7
Greens	Meike Günter	23,466	27.7	▼7.3	26,850	31.5	▼3.4
AfD	Nikolaos Boutakoglou	14,285	16.8	▲8.2	14,141	16.6	▲8.0
SPD	Torsten Liebig	6,282	7.4	▼1.7	4,364	5.1	▼4.0
FDP	Helena Herzig	5,614	6.6	▼4.5	4,594	5.4	▼5.7
Left	Steve Burgstett	3,700	4.4	▲1.7	2,642	3.1	▲0.4
FW					1,774	2.1	▼1.8
BSW					925	1.1	
APT					694	0.8	
Volt					638	0.7	▲0.1
PARTEI					330	0.4	▼1.1
dieBasis					291	0.3	▼0.6
Values	Walter Müller	455	0.5		278	0.3	
Bündnis C					214	0.3	
ÖDP					184	0.2	▼0.5
Team Todenhöfer					140	0.2	
Pensioners					133	0.2	
PdF					58	0.1	
Verjüngungsforschung					51	0.1	
KlimalisteBW					36	0.0	▼0.5
Humanists					34	0.0	
Informal votes		738			409		
Total valid votes		84,818			85,147		
Turnout		85,556	73.9	▲4.7			
CDU gain from Greens	Majority	7,550	8.9				

=== 2021 election ===
State election (2026): Vaihingen
Party	Candidate	Votes	%	±%
Greens	Markus Rösler	27,468	34.9	▲1.8
CDU	Konrad Epple	19,478	24.8	▼2.2
FDP	Roland Zitzmann	8,738	11.1	▲2.1
SPD	Torsten Liebig	7,198	9.2	▼2.3
AfD	Friedemann Meyer	6,778	8.6	▼5.5
FW	Klaus Pflieger	3,082	3.9	
Left	Stephan Ludwig	2,098	2.7	▲0.5
PARTEI	Tobias Schmidt	1,209	1.5	
dieBasis	Randolf Knapp	757	1.0	
ÖDP	Guido Klamt	601	0.8	▲0.1
WiR2020	Claudia Fritsche	503	0.6	
KlimalisteBW	Magnus Rembold	395	0.5	
Volt	Zahra Boussata	332	0.4	
Majority		7,990	10.1	
Rejected ballots		428	0.5	▼0.3
Turnout		79,065	69.2	▼6.7
Registered electors		114,250		
Greens hold		Swing		

== See also ==
- Politics of Baden-Württemberg
- Landtag of Baden-Württemberg
