= Ditzingen =

- Town
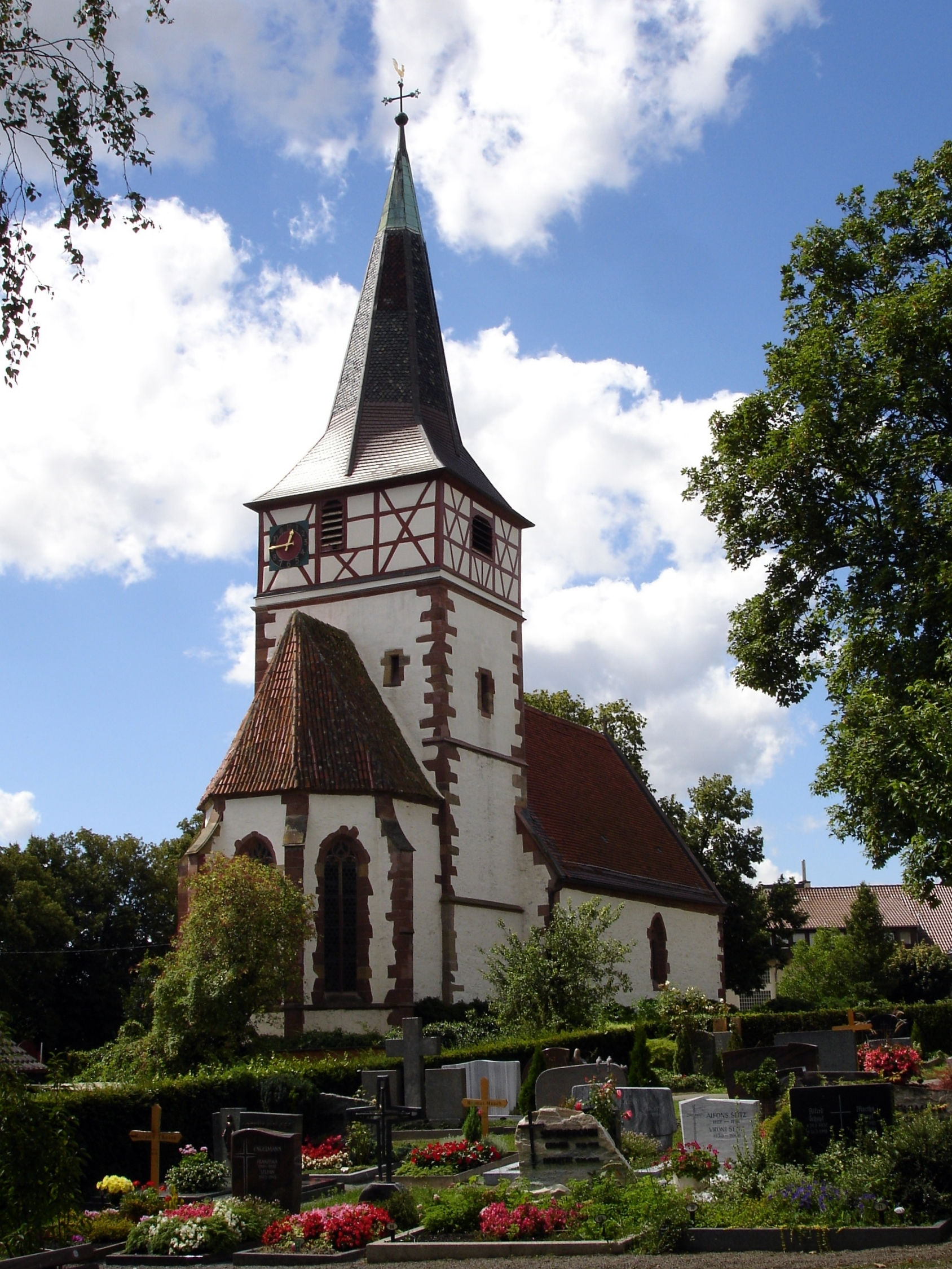
- Speyrer Church

- Coat of arms

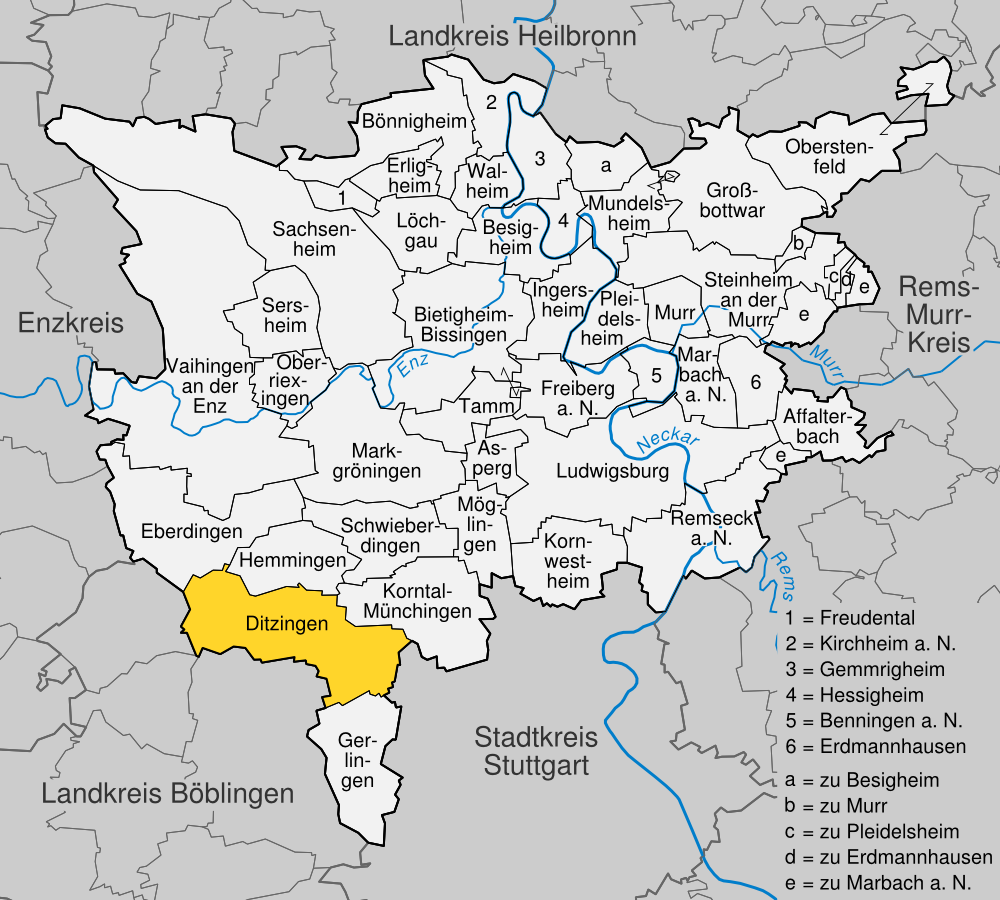
- Location of Ditzingen within Ludwigsburg district
- Interactive map of Ditzingen
- Location within Germany Location within Baden-Württemberg
- Coordinates: 48°49′35″N 9°4′0″E
- Country: Germany
- State: Baden-Württemberg
- Admin. region: Stuttgart
- District: Ludwigsburg

Government
  - Mayor (2023–31): Michael Makurath (Ind.)

Area
  - Total: 30.38 km^{2} (11.73 sq mi)
- Elevation: 303 m (994 ft)

Population (2025-12-31)
  - Total: 22,551
  - Density: 742.3/km^{2} (1,923/sq mi)
- Time zone: UTC+01:00 (CET)
  - Summer (DST): UTC+02:00 (CEST)
- Postal codes: 71240–71254
- Dialling codes: 07156, 07152
- Vehicle registration: LB
- Website: www.ditzingen.de

Ditzingen (German pronunciation: [ˈdɪtsɪŋən]; Swabian: Ditzenge) is a town in the district of Ludwigsburg, Baden-Württemberg, Germany. It is located approximately 10 km northwest of Stuttgart, and 12 km southwest of Ludwigsburg. The Hirschlanden transmitter was located near Ditzingen-Hirschlanden. Ditzingen is the home of Bürger GmbH, Reclam and also Trumpf GmbH.

== Geography ==
=== Geographic location ===
Ditzingen is located in the southwestern Neckar basin in the Strohgäu at the transition to the so-called Long Field. The urban area lies between the Strudelbach in the west and the Glems in the east. The Glems, a right tributary of the Enz River, flows through the center of Ditzingen. The city center is on the right of the river.

The Glems formerly formed the tribal border of the Swabians and Franks and was also the border of the two dioceses Roman Catholic Diocese of Speyer and Bishopric of Constance.

=== Neighboring communities ===
The following cities and municipalities adjoin the city of Ditzingen. They are called clockwise starting in the east:

- Weilimdorf (district of Stuttgart)
- Gerlingen (district of Ludwigsburg)
- Leonberg and Weissach (both district of Böblingen)
- Eberdingen, Hemmingen and Korntal-Münchingen (all three district of Ludwigsburg)

=== City structure ===
Ditzingen includes the formerly independent communities Heimerdingen, Hirschlanden and Schöckingen which were incorporated in the 1970s (or combined with the city).

The former municipalities are districts and at the same time localities within the meaning of the Baden-Württemberg municipal code, which means they have a local council that is headed by a village mayor. The local councils are elected in every local election by the population eligible to vote in the village. There is also an administrative office in each village, which serves as the local town hall.

The town of Ditzingen (in the borders of June 30, 1970) include the city Ditzingen, the estates Grüner Baum and Lerchenhöfe, the living places Maurener Berg, Oberes Glemstal, Ölberg and Steinröhre and the houses Ferbermühle, Tonmühle and Zechlesmühle.

The former municipality Heimerdingen includes the village Heimerdingen and the outgoing town Stetten.

The village Hirschlanden as well as the local villages Holzheim and Rotweil belong to the former municipality Hirschlanden.

The village Schöckingen and the living place Talmühle belong to the former municipality Schöckingen.

=== Area distribution ===
According to data from the Statistical State Office of Baden-Württemberg, as of 2014.

== Culture ==
The Ditzingen City Archives preserve the city's historical records.

== Twin towns – sister cities ==
Ditzingen is twinned with:

- Gyula, Hungary (1991)
- Rillieux-la-Pape, France (2010)

== Notable people ==
- Theodor von Heuglin (1824–1876), explorer and ornithologist
- Thomas D (born 1968), musician and rapper
- Günther Oettinger (born 1953), politician and lawyer
