= Macit Karaahmetoğlu =

German politician

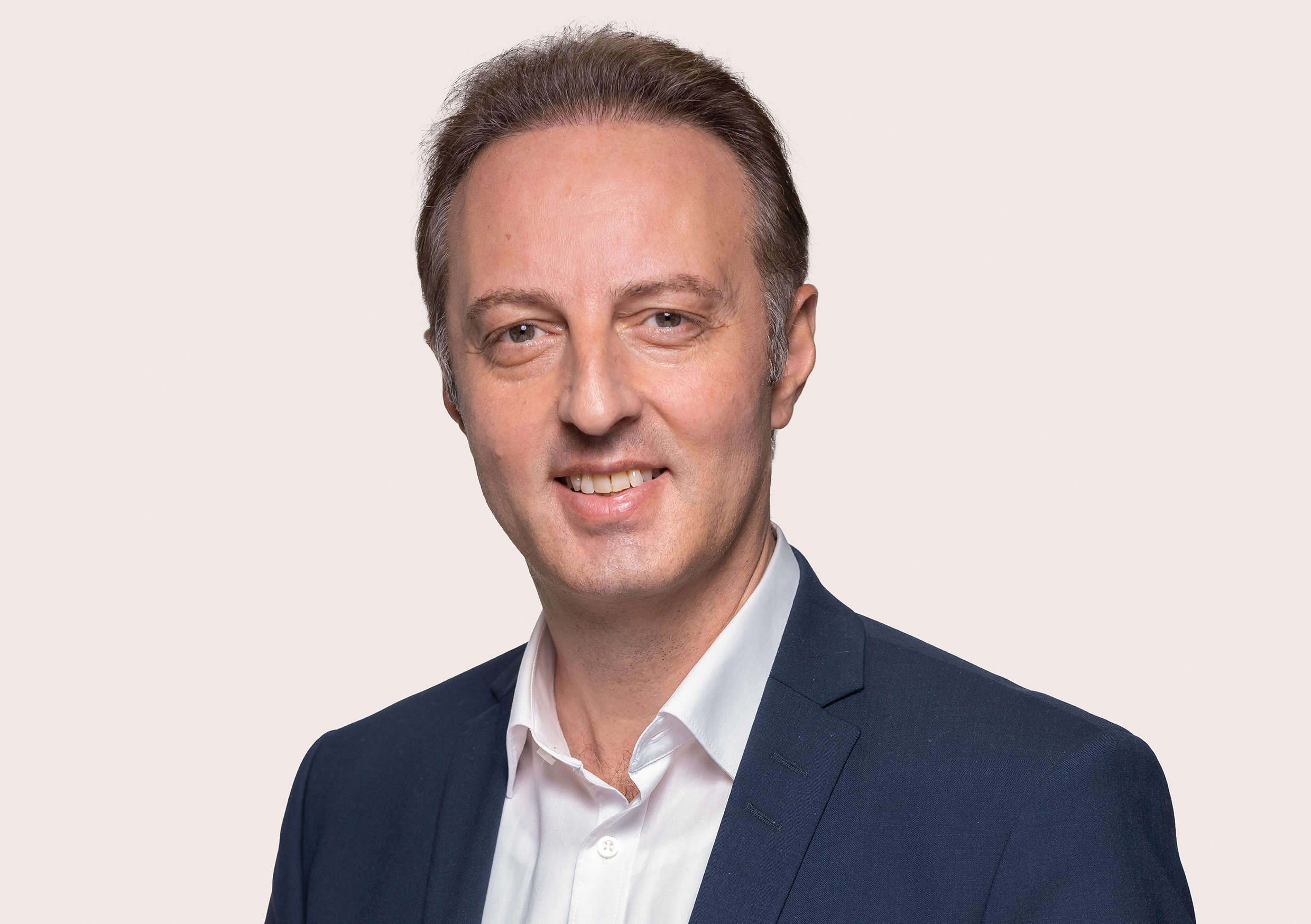

Member of the Bundestag
- Incumbent
- Assumed office 26 October 2021

Personal details
- Born: 11 July 1968 (age 58) Rize, Turkey
- Party: SPD
- Education: University of Tübingen; University of Heidelberg

Macit Karaahmetoğlu (born 11 July 1968) is a German lawyer and politician of the Social Democratic Party (SPD) who has been a Member of the German Bundestag since 2021.

== Early life ==
Karaahmetoğlu was born in Turkey, and moved to Germany at the age of 11. He graduated from Heidelberg University.

== Political career ==
In the 1998 Bundestag elections, Karaahmetoğlu was the top candidate in Baden-Württemberg for the Democratic Party of Germany (1995), which existed from 1995 to 2002, and also stood for them in the Ludwigsburg Bundestag constituency. In the 2009 European elections, Karaahmetoğlu ran on the state list of the SPD Baden-Württemberg. In the federal elections of 2013 and 2017, he ran unsuccessfully for the SPD in the federal constituency of Ludwigsburg .

In the 2021 federal election for the SPD and was elected to the 20th German Bundestag via the Baden-Württemberg state list. In parliament, he has since been a full member of the Committee on Legal Affair and the Committee for Election Verification, Immunity and Rules of Procedure. He is also a deputy member of the Committee on Foreign Affairs and deputy chairman of the German-Turkish Parliamentary Friendship Group.

Karaahmetoğlu is district chairman of the SPD Ludwigsburg and chairman of the board of directors of the Arbeiter-Samariter-Bund Baden-Württemberg Region Stuttgart.
