= Raban Adelmann =

German politician

Member of the Bundestag; for Ludwigsburg
- In office 15 October 1957 – 15 October 1961
- Preceded by: Karl Mommer
- Succeeded by: Karl Mommer

Personal details
- Born: 18 September 1912 Düsseldorf, Germany
- Died: 25 January 1992 (aged 79) Kleinbottwar, Baden-Württemberg, Germany
- Party: Christian Democratic Union
- Children: 5
- Education: University of Bonn; University of Cologne; Williams College

Raban Adelmann (9 September 1912 – 18 September 1992) was a German politician of the Christian Democratic Union (CDU) and former member of the German Bundestag.

== Life ==
Adelmann was a member of the German Bundestag from 1957 to 1961. As a member of the CDU, he represented the constituency of Ludwigsburg in parliament.

== Literature ==
Herbst, Ludolf; Jahn, Bruno (2002). Vierhaus, Rudolf (ed.). Biographisches Handbuch der Mitglieder des Deutschen Bundestages. 1949–2002 [Biographical Handbook of the Members of the German Bundestag. 1949–2002] (in German). München: De Gruyter - De Gruyter Saur. p. 1715. ISBN 978-3-11-184511-1.
