= Steffen Bilger =

German politician (born 1979)

Steffen Bilger MdB
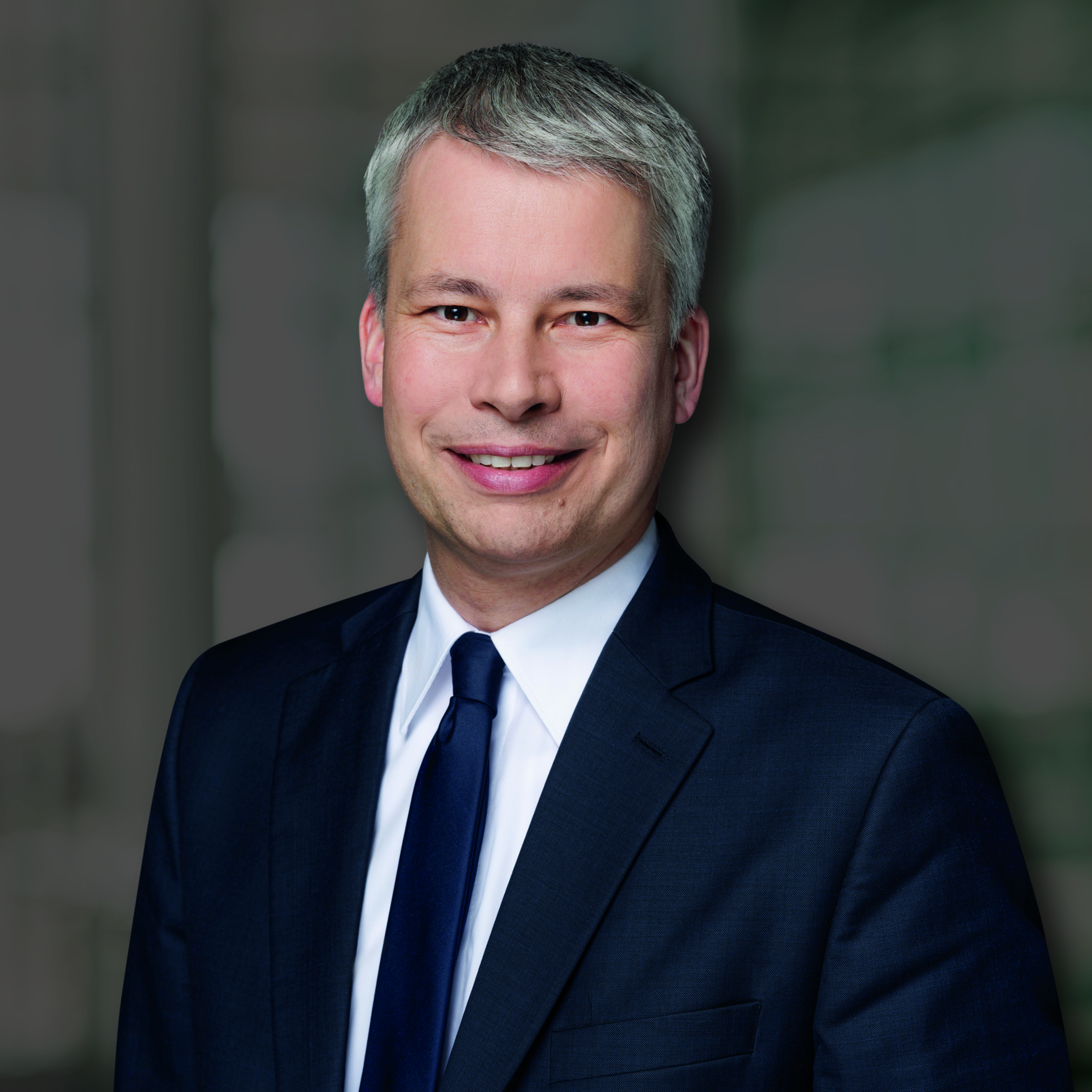
- Bilger in 2024

Minister of Transport
- Incumbent
- Assumed office 29 July 2026
- Chancellor: Friedrich Merz
- Preceded by: Patrick Schnieder

Member of the Bundestag; for Ludwigsburg
- Incumbent
- Assumed office 27 October 2009
- Preceded by: Matthias Wissmann (2007)

Personal details
- Born: 16 February 1979 (age 47) Schongau, Bavaria, West Germany
- Party: Christian Democratic Union
- Education: University of Tübingen
- Occupation: Lawyer

Steffen Bilger (born 16 February 1979) is a German lawyer and politician of the Christian Democratic Union (CDU) who has been serving as the Federal Minister of Transport in the government of Chancellor Friedrich Merz since 2026. He has been a member of the Bundestag for the constituency of Ludwigsburg since 2009.

From 2018 until 2021, Bilger served as Parliamentary State Secretary at the Federal Ministry of Transport and Digital Infrastructure in the cabinet of Chancellor Angela Merkel.

== Education and early career ==
After graduation in 1998 at Max Born High School in Backnang, Bilger did his civilian service. He then studied law at the Eberhard-Karls University of Tübingen, which he finished in 2004 with the first state law examination. In 2006, Bilger completed a legal traineeship at the Stuttgart Regional Court with the second state law exam.

In 2007, Bilger was admitted as a lawyer and founded a law firm together with two colleagues. From 2006 until 2009, he also worked in the strategy department of the Mannheim-based energy service company MVV Energie.

== Political career ==
Already as a student Bilger joined the Young Union (JU) in 1996 and was also a member of the CDU. From 1998 to 1999 he served as chairman of the Baden-Württemberg state branch of the Pupils' Union and from 1998 to 2000 as federal managing director of the Pupils Union Germany. In 2006, Bilger was elected chairman of the Junge Union Baden-Württemberg and was confirmed in office in the years 2008, 2009 and 2010.

In 2011, Bilger was elected district chairman of the CDU North Württemberg, the largest of the four CDU districts in Baden-Württemberg. He won clearly against his competitor, the former Secretary of State for Arts, Dietrich Birk. After his election as CDU district chairman, he ran again as country chairman of the Junge Union and was replaced in this office on 12 November 2011 by the Mannheim CDU city councillor Nikolas Löbel.

=== Member of the German Parliament, 2009–present ===
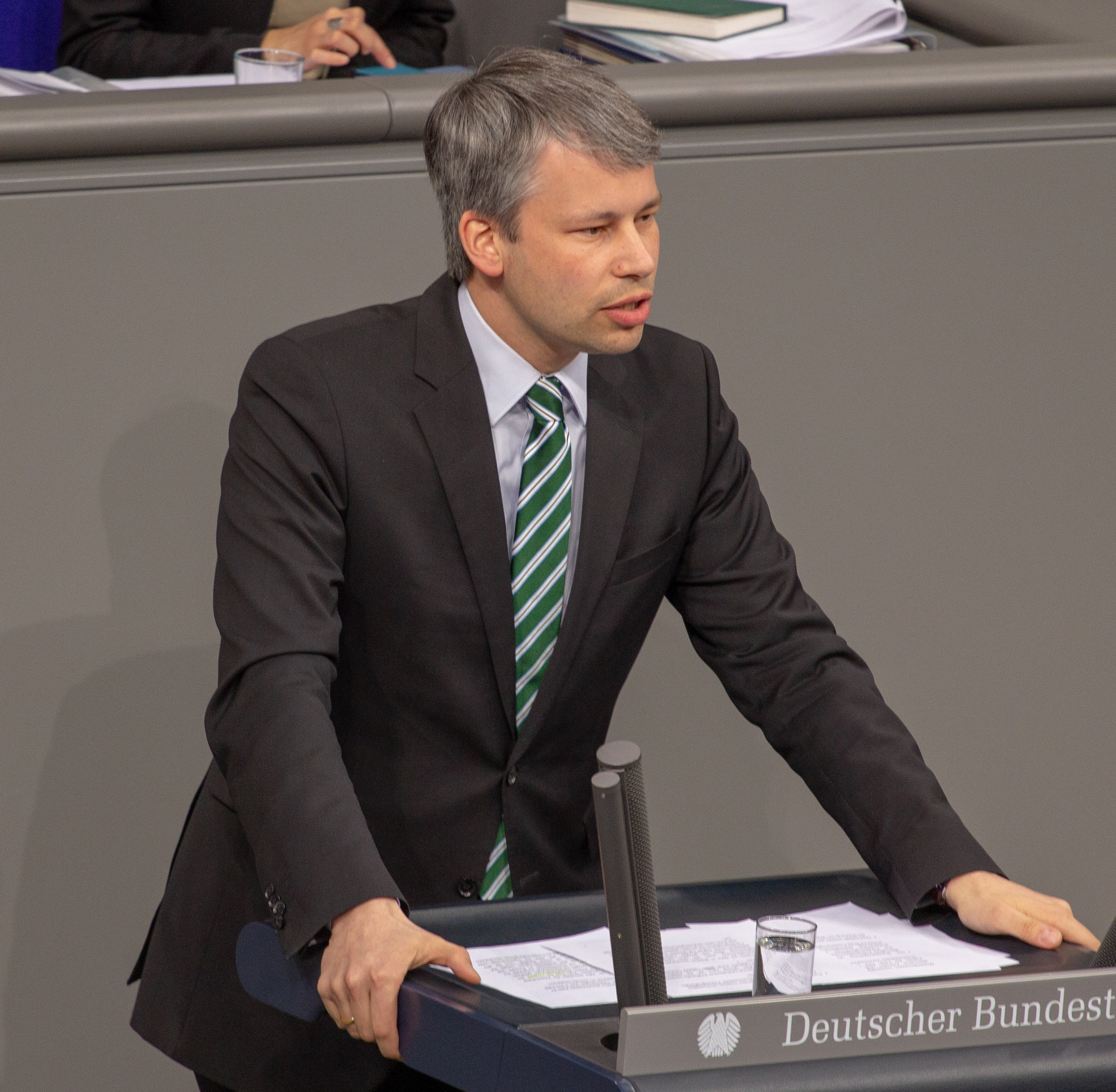
Bilger in 2019

In the 2009 federal election, Bilger won the direct mandate in constituency of Ludwigsburg with 39.9% of the vote and became a member of the German Bundestag. In the 17th Bundestag he was a full member in the Committee on Transport, Construction and Urban Development, a member of the Parliamentary Advisory Council on Sustainable Development and a deputy member of the Committees Health and Environment, Nature Conservation and Nuclear Safety. He was also a full member of the Enquete Commission Growth, Prosperity, Quality of Life.

In the 2013 federal election, Bilger won again with 50.4% of the vote the direct mandate in constituency of Ludwigsburg. In the 18th Bundestag, he was a full member in the Parliamentary Advisory Council on Sustainable Development, the Committee on Transport and Digital Infrastructure and in the Joint Committee. He has also been Chairman of the MIT Transport Forum since 2013 and since 2016 a full member of the Conciliation Committee of the German Bundestag and the Bundesrat. On the Committee on Transport and Digital Infrastructure, Bilger served as his parliamentary group's rapporteur on electric vehicles and alternative fuel vehicles.

In addition to his committee assignments, Bilger also headed the Parliamentary Advisory Board on Electromobility. Furthermore, he was also Chairman of the Young Group, the association of all Union members under the age of 35, until January 2018.

In the 2017 federal election, Bilger won again the direct mandate in the constituency of Ludwigsburg with 38.3%. He became once again a full member of the Committee on Transport and Digital Infrastructure. In the associated working group of the CDU / CSU parliamentary group, he was elected at the end of January 2018 with 95.5% of the votes as chairman and deputy chairman of the group.

During the coalition negotiations between the Union and the SPD, Bilger was part of the working group on transport and infrastructure, led by Thomas Strobl, Alexander Dobrindt and Sören Bartol. From 2018 until 2021, he served as Parliamentary State Secretary at the Federal Ministry of Transport and Digital Infrastructure under minister Andreas Scheuer. In this capacity, he was also the Federal Government Coordinator for Freight and Logistics.

From 2021 to 2025, Bilger served as one his parliamentary group's deputy chairs, under the leadership of successive chairs Ralph Brinkhaus (2021–2022) and Friedrich Merz (2022–2025). In this capacity, he oversaw the group’s legislative activities on agriculture, environmental policy, nature conservation and consumer protection.

Following the 2025 elections until his appointment to the government in 2026, Bilger was his parliamentary group's chief whip, under the leadership of chairman Jens Spahn.

== Other activities ==
- Federal Agency for Civic Education, Chairman of the Board of Trustees (since 2014)
- Federal Network Agency for Electricity, Gas, Telecommunications, Post and Railway (BNetzA), Member of the Rail Infrastructure Advisory Council (since 2013)
- Ludwigsburg Festival, Member of the Board of Trustees
- Quadriga Hochschule Berlin, Member of the Advisory Board on Politics and Public Affairs
- Theaterhaus Stuttgart, Member of the Board of Trustees
- German Federal Environmental Foundation (DBU), Member of the Board of Trustees (2024–2026)
- German Renewable Energy Federation (BEE), Member of the Parliamentary Advisory Board (2009-2012)

== Personal life ==
Bilger is married and has three children.
