= Matthias Wissmann =

German lawyer and politician (born 1949)

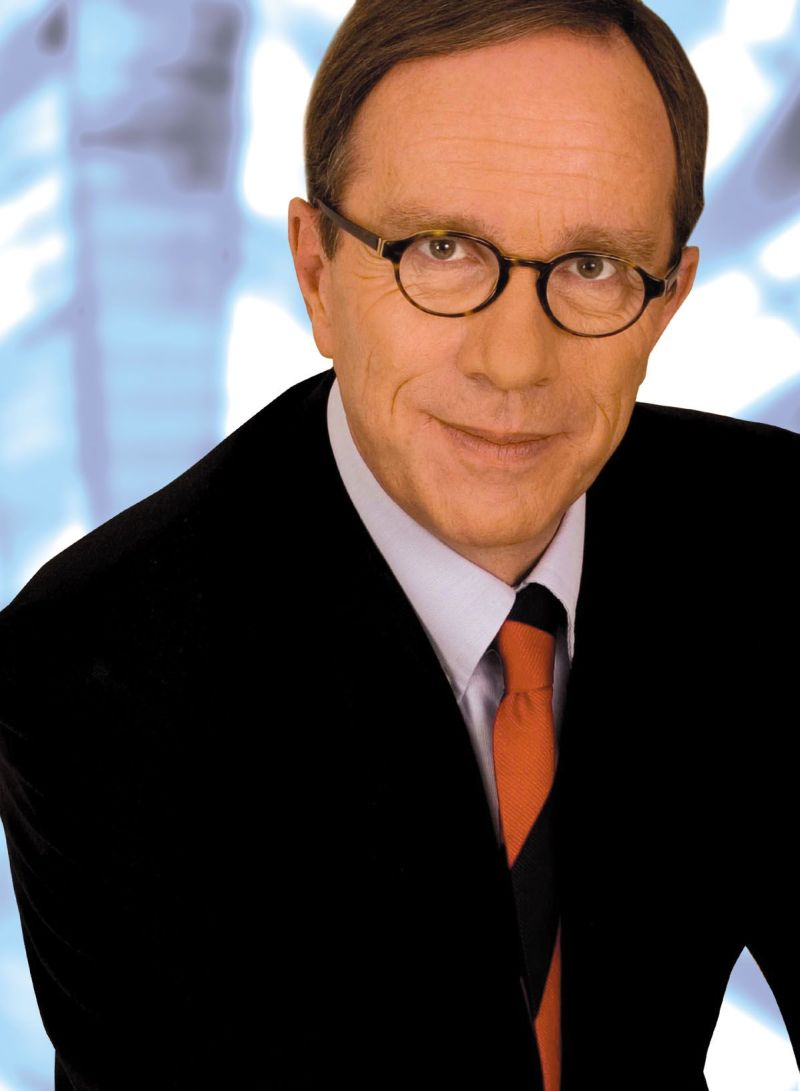

Minister of Transport
- In office 13 May 1993 – 26 October 1998
- Chancellor: Helmut Kohl
- Preceded by: Günther Krause
- Succeeded by: Franz Müntefering

Minister of Scientific Research
- In office 21 January 1993 – 13 May 1993
- Chancellor: Helmut Kohl
- Preceded by: Heinz Riesenhuber
- Succeeded by: Paul Krüger

Member of the Bundestag; for Ludwigsburg
- In office 14 December 1976 – 31 May 2007
- Preceded by: Gunter Huonker
- Succeeded by: Steffen Bilger (2009)

Personal details
- Born: 15 April 1949 (age 77) Ludwigsburg, Baden-Württemberg, West Germany (now Germany)
- Party: Christian Democratic Union
- Education: University of Tübingen; University of Bonn
- Occupation: Lawyer

Matthias Wissmann (born 15 April 1949) is a German lawyer and politician of the Christian Democratic Union (CDU). He served as the president of the German Automobile Industry Association (VdA) from 2007 until 2018.

Since 1999 Wissmann has been a partner with the law firm WilmerHale.

== Early life and education ==
Wissmann was born in Ludwigsburg on 15 April 1949. He studied law at the university of Bonn. He became a member of K.D.St.V. Alania Bonn, a catholic student fraternity that is member of the Cartellverband.

== Political career ==
Since 1965, Wissmann has been active in politics. He became a member of the political youth organisation Junge Union and in 1968 of the CDU. From 1973 to 1983 he was federal leader of the Junge Union.

In 1976, Wissmann was elected to the German Bundestag for the Christlich-Demokratische Union. In 1981, he was chairman of the commission Jugendprotest im demokratischen Staat (youth protest in the democratic state) until 1983. In the years 1983 until 1993 he was the spokesman of his parliamentary group for economic affairs, under the leadership of successive chairmen Alfred Dregger and Wolfgang Schäuble.

On 21 January 1993, Wissmann became Federal Minister of Research and Technology in the government of Chancellor Helmut Kohl. Only four-month later, after the resignation of Günther Krause, he became Federal Minister of Transport on 13 May 1993.

During his time in office, Wissmann – together with the Governing Mayor of Berlin Eberhard Diepgen and the Minister-President of Brandenburg Manfred Stolpe – committed to Schönefeld as the site for the new Berlin Brandenburg Airport on 28 May 1996. This so-called consensus decision was later affirmed by the respective state legislatures.

Wissmann left the government after his party lost the federal elections on 27 September 1998.

During Wolfgang Schäuble's tenure as party chairman from 1998 to 2000, Wissmann served as federal treasurer of the CDU. By April 2000, following the CDU donations scandal, he had to report an annual deficit of more than $8 million and oversaw efforts to cut personnel, rent out part of the party's new Berlin headquarters, and shrink its publications.

From 1998 to 2002 Wissmann also was the chairman of the parliamentary Committee on Economic Affairs and Technology. From 2002 he served as chairman of the Committee on the Affairs of the European Union.

During his time in parliament, Wissmann also became partner at the international law firm WilmerHale. At the firm, he was a member of the corporate group, where he focused on transactions having a transatlantic dimension, and headed the Legal Strategy and Public Policy practice group in Berlin.

== Life after politics ==
Wissmann laid down his parliamentary mandate by 31 May 2007 to become the president of the German Automobile Industry Association (VDA) from 1 June 2007. He held this office until February 2018. During his time in office, he also served as vice-president of Pro Mobilität, an industry group lobbying for improvements in Germany's street network.

In 2014, Federal Minister for Economic Affairs and Energy Sigmar Gabriel appointed Wissmann to the government's advisory board on the Transatlantic Trade and Investment Partnership (TTIP).

In October 2016, Wissmann was unanimously elected as president of the Organisation Internationale des Constructeurs d'Automobiles (OICA) for a two-year mandate, succeeding Yong-geun Kim. Since 2017, he has also been Vice President of the Federation of German Industries (BDI).

== Other activities ==
=== Corporate boards ===
- ODDO BHF, Member of the supervisory board (from 2019)
- Freitag & Co., Member of the advisory board (since 2016)
- Lufthansa, Member of the supervisory board (2008-2020)
- Landesbank Baden-Württemberg (LBBW), Member of the advisory board (-2010)
- Seeburger AG, Member of the Supervisory Board
- EnBW, Member of the advisory board (2004-2009)

=== Non-profits ===
- Federation of German Industries (BDI), Ex-Officio Member of the Presidium
- Ludwigsburg Festival, Member of the Board of Trustees
- Stifterverband für die Deutsche Wissenschaft, Member of the Board of Trustees
- Trilateral Commission, Member of the European Group
