= Sachsenheim =

- Town
- Coat of arms

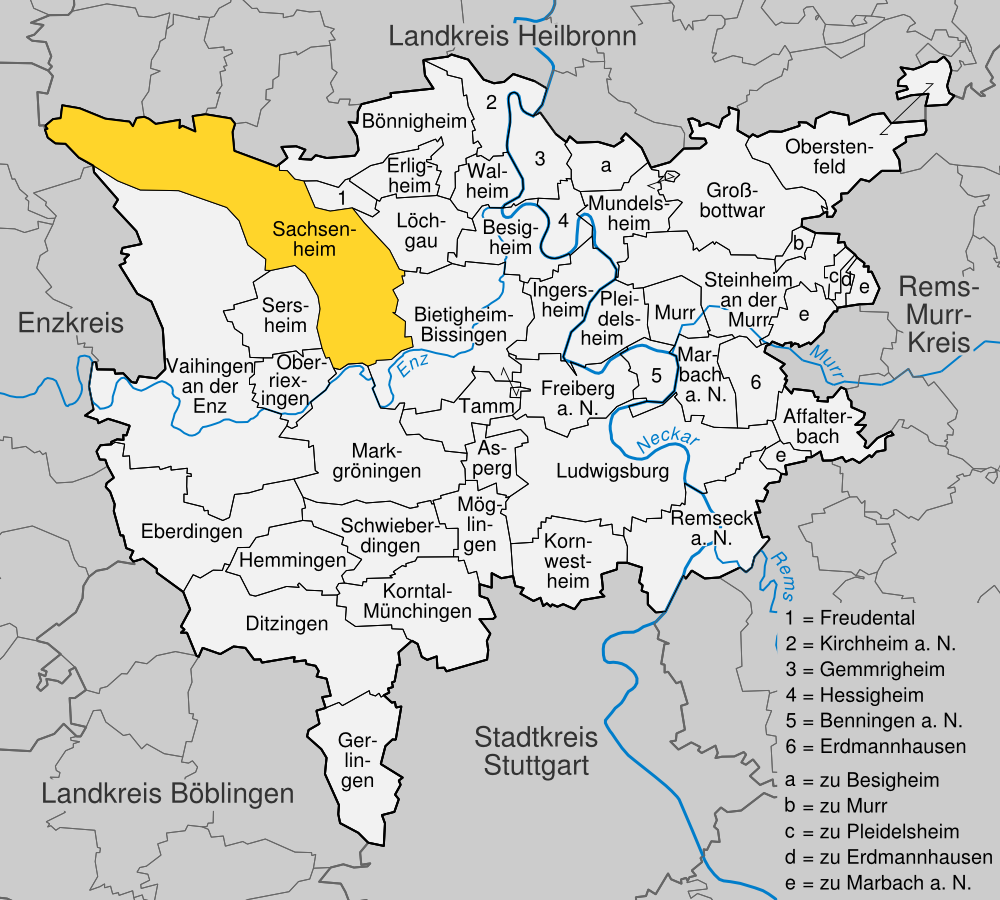
- Location of Sachsenheim within Ludwigsburg district
- Interactive map of Sachsenheim
- Location within Germany Location within Baden-Württemberg
- Coordinates: 48°57′36″N 9°3′53″E
- Country: Germany
- State: Baden-Württemberg
- Admin. region: Stuttgart
- District: Ludwigsburg

Government
  - Mayor (2019–27): Holger Albrich

Area
  - Total: 57.92 km^{2} (22.36 sq mi)
- Elevation: 246 m (807 ft)

Population (2025-12-31)
  - Total: 18,549
  - Density: 320.3/km^{2} (829.4/sq mi)
- Time zone: UTC+01:00 (CET)
  - Summer (DST): UTC+02:00 (CEST)
- Postal codes: 74343
- Dialling codes: 07147, 07046
- Vehicle registration: LB
- Website: www.sachsenheim.de

Sachsenheim (German pronunciation: [ˈzaksn̩haɪm]) is a town in the district of Ludwigsburg, Baden-Württemberg, Germany. It is situated 11 km northwest of Ludwigsburg.

== Buildings ==
- The most important attraction is the water castle in Großsachsenheim. Built in the 14th century, burned down in 1542 and rebuilt in 1544. 1952 the castle was purchased by the city Großsachsenheim and is since 1962 the town hall.

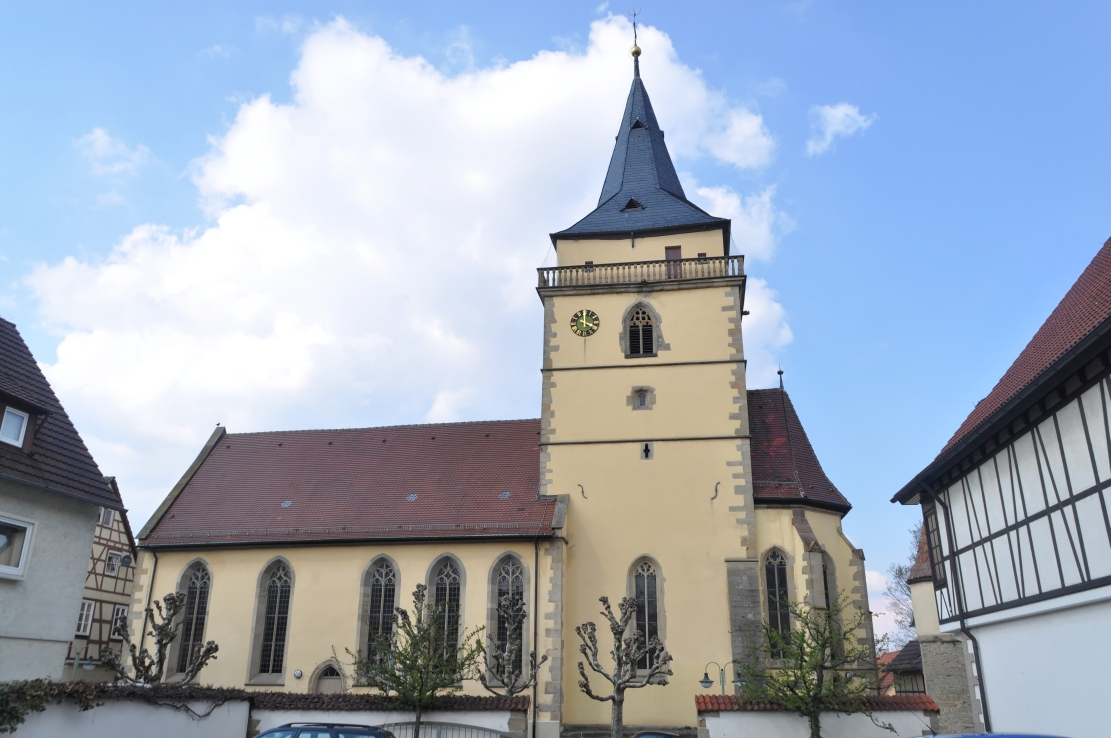
Sachsenheim St. Fabian and Sebastian

- Evangelische Stadtkirche "St. Fabian and Sebastian "in Großsachsenheim, former fortified church
- Remains of the old city wall with tower
- Evangelische Stadtkirche Kleinsachsenheim, former fortified church, rebuilt in 1460 and 1619, reconstruction 1948-1950
- Town hall Kleinsachsenheim, half-timbered building, first mentioned in 1614
- Parish Church "St. George "Hohenhaslach from 1230. Valuable early Gothic frescos

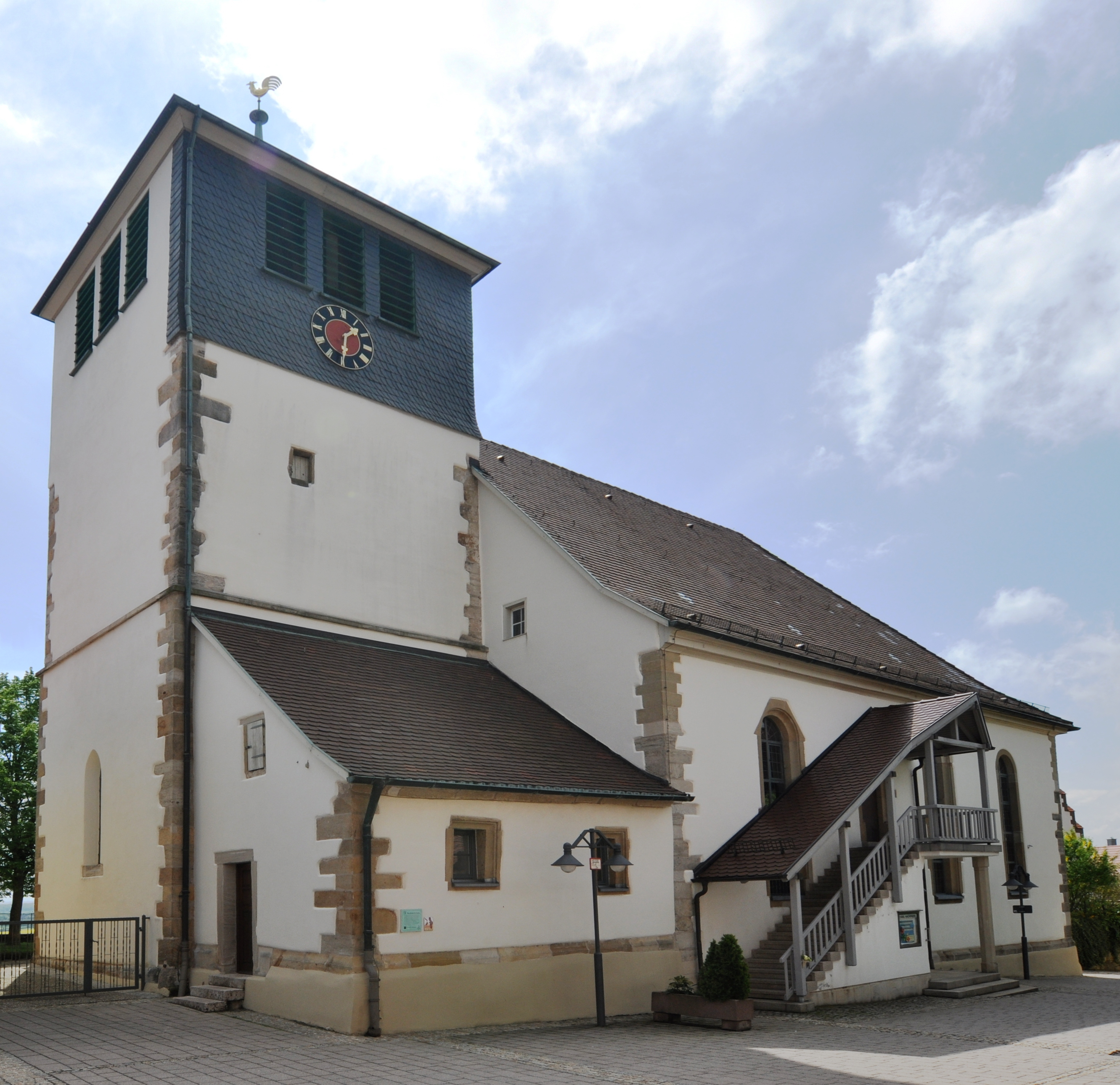
Hohenhaslach St. Georg

- Village road Ochsenbach, half-timbered houses from the 16th to 18th centuries

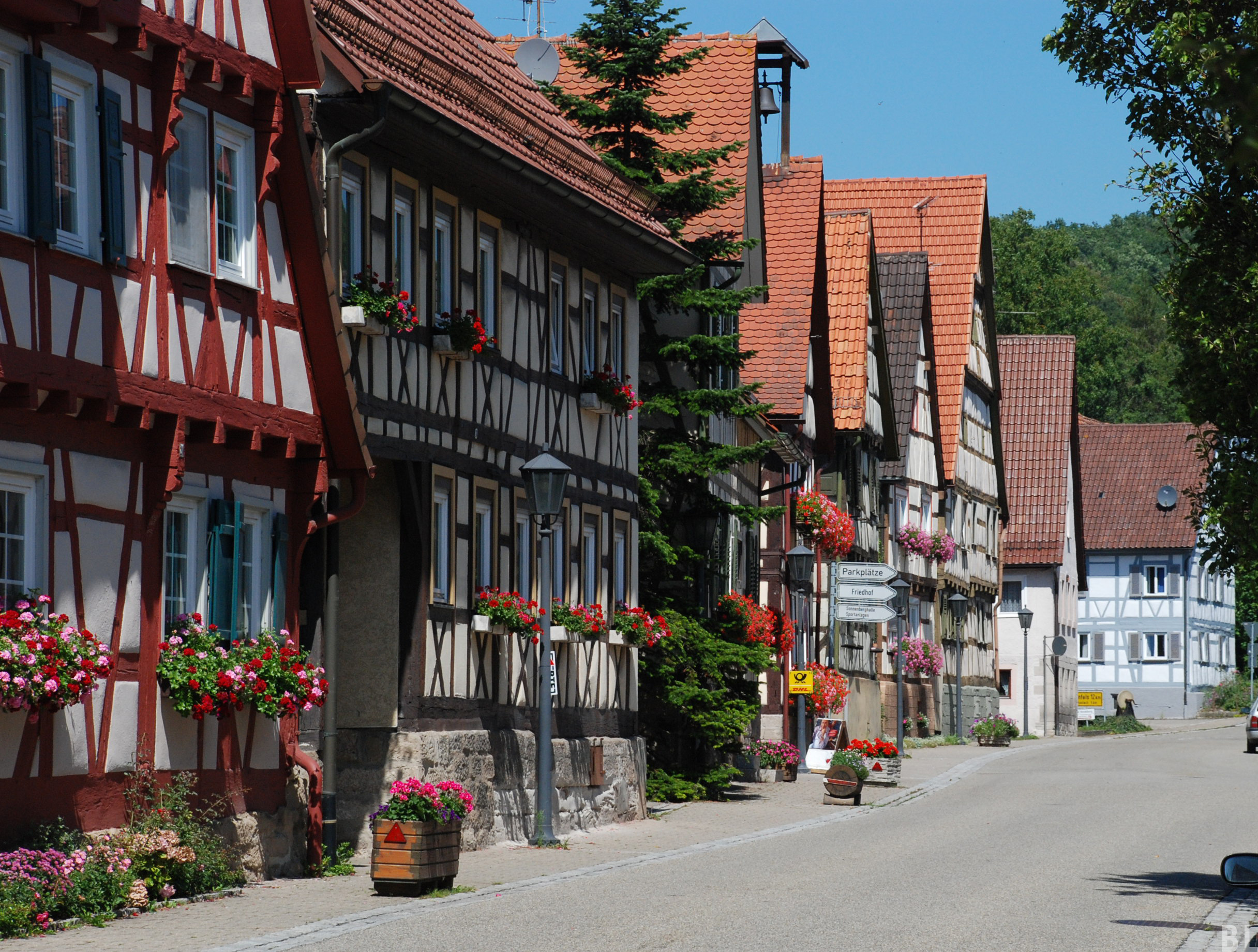
Ochsenbach

- Protestant parish "Our Lady" Ochsenbach, built around 1290, Gothic frescoes of 1430
- Evangelical church "St. Remigius "Häfnerhaslach, Gothic choir with ribbed vaults, frescoes (around 1400)
- North of Ochsenbach is the telecommunication tower Cleebronn

== Regular events ==
- Heimatfest in five-year intervals
- Krämer market in Hohenhaslach (always on 1 May)
- Summer at the castle (on the 3rd weekend in July)
- Sachsenheimer Summer Special (on the 3rd weekend of September)
- Christmas market in the exterior courtyard (always on 2nd Advent)

== Economy and Infrastructure ==
=== Viticulture ===
The neighborhoods in Kirbachtal and Kleinsachsenheim has a long wine growing history. Approximately 250 hectares of the district area of the city consists of vineyards.

=== Transportation ===
Sachsenheim is located approximately 30 kilometers from the state capital Stuttgart.

- Car: Bundesautobahn 81 exit Ludwigsburg-Nord, continues on B 27 and L 1125 to Großsachsenheim
- Railway: Sachsenheim is connected to the rail network by the in Großsachsenheim located station Sachsenheim to the Württemberg Western Railway (Bietigheim-Bissingen-Bruchsal); the station serves the regional express line Stuttgart-Bietigheim-Bissingen-Mühlacker-Heidelberg, the Regional Express-line Stuttgart-Bietigheim-Bissingen-Mühlacker-Pforzheim-Karlsruhe and the S-Bahn lines S5 (Bietigheim-Bissingen-Mühlacker-Pforzheim-Karlsruhe-Wörth) and S6 (Bietigheim-Bissingen-Mühlacker-Pforzheim-Wildbad)

== Sons and daughters of the town ==
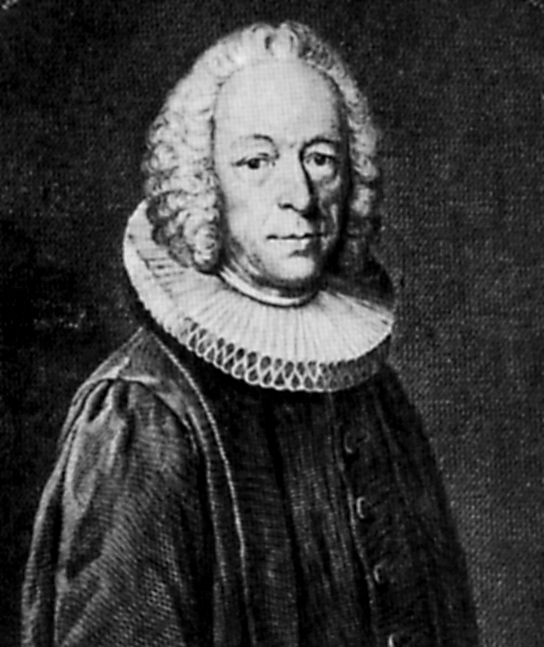
Eberhard David Hauber

- Hermann von Sachsenheim (1365-1458), poet
- Eberhard David Hauber (1695-1765), born in Hohenhaslach, theologian

== Other ==
Sachsenheim became known nationwide when it became public that some members of the far-left militant group Red Army Faction (Rote Armee Fraktion, also known as the Baader-Meinhof Gang), had lived there for several weeks. After the assassination of Siegfried Buback the police found here the getaway car – a silver-gray Alfa Romeo Giulia in the residential and commercial complex opposite the railway station, as well as evidence that group members Christian Klar, Knut Folkerts and Günter Sonnenberg had been based there.

== See also ==
- Media related to Sachsenheim at Wikimedia Commons

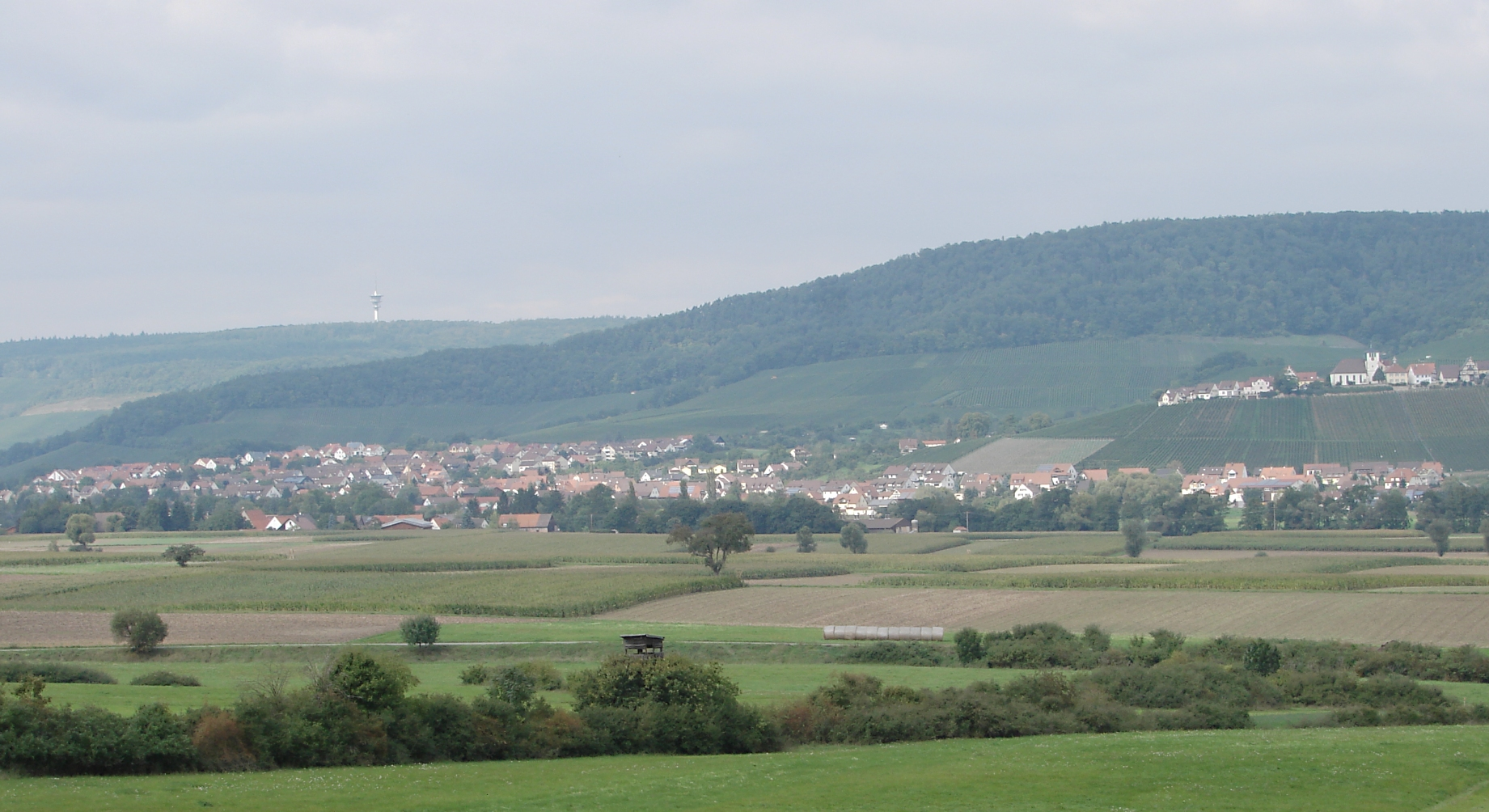
Hohenhaslach, part of Sachsenheim
