= Möglingen =

- Municipality
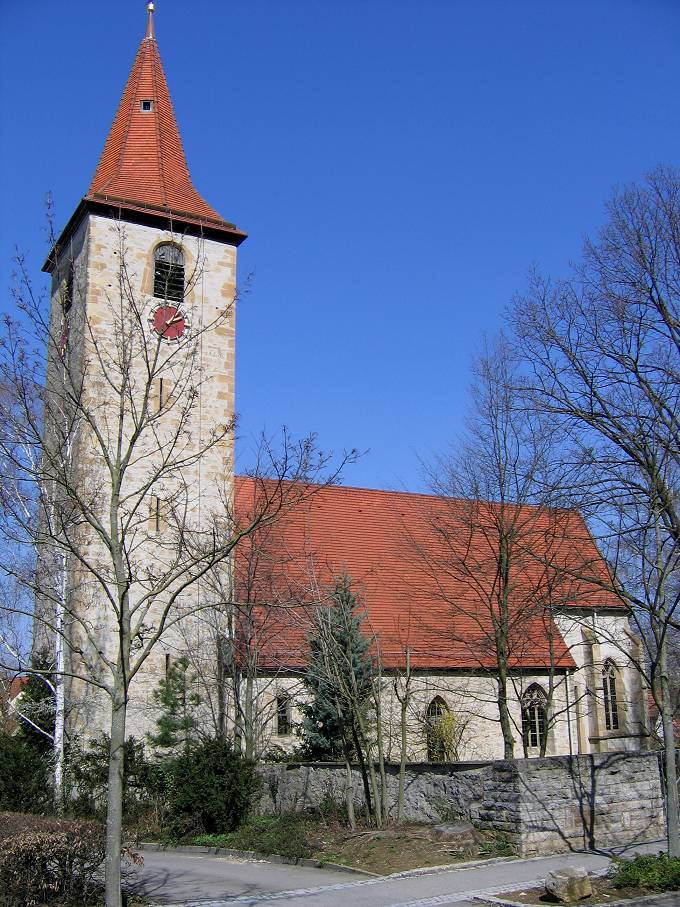
- Pankratius Church

- Coat of arms

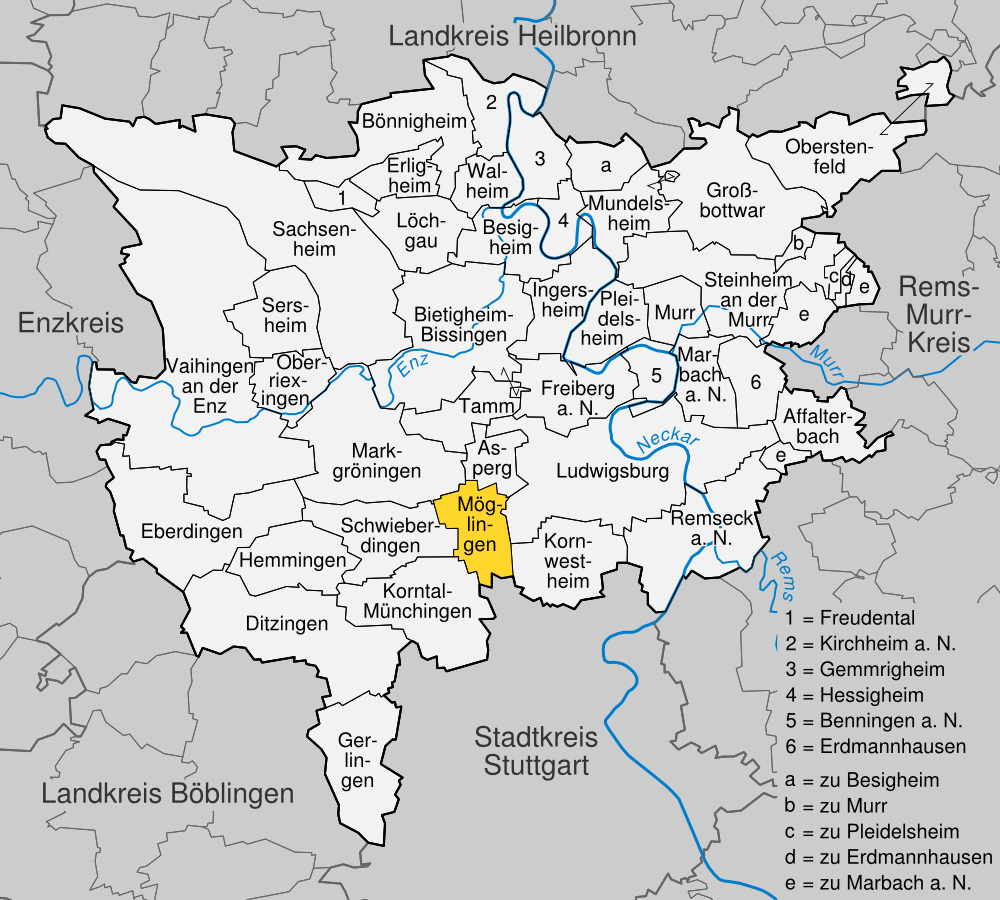
- Location of Möglingen within Ludwigsburg district
- Interactive map of Möglingen
- Location within Germany Location within Baden-Württemberg
- Coordinates: 48°53′18″N 9°7′45″E
- Country: Germany
- State: Baden-Württemberg
- Admin. region: Stuttgart
- District: Ludwigsburg

Government
  - Mayor (2023–31): Rebecca Schwaderer

Area
  - Total: 9.93 km^{2} (3.83 sq mi)
- Elevation: 297 m (974 ft)

Population (2025-12-31)
  - Total: 10,730
  - Density: 1,080/km^{2} (2,800/sq mi)
- Time zone: UTC+01:00 (CET)
  - Summer (DST): UTC+02:00 (CEST)
- Postal codes: 71696
- Dialling codes: 07141
- Vehicle registration: LB, VAI
- Website: www.moeglingen.de

Möglingen is a municipality in the district of Ludwigsburg, Baden-Württemberg, Germany. It is situated 13 km northwest of Stuttgart, and 5 km west of Ludwigsburg. Möglingen has the headquarter of the "Württemberger Weingärtner-Zentralgenossenschaft" (Wuertembergian Vine Dresser Cooperative)

== History ==
Möglingen was first mentioned in 1275 in a document of the Bishopric of Constance and mentioned in 1278 as "Meginingen" in a document of Count Ulrich of Asperg.

In the 13th century Möglingen was mainly in the hands of the County Palatine of Tübingens., who sold their remaining stake in 1308 to the House of Württemberg.

Since the 14th century the village belonged to Württembergian Oberamt Gröningen, from 1718 alternately to 1807 resolved Oberamt Gröningen and Oberamt Ludwigsburg, that became in 1934 the Ludwigsburg (district).

During the Thirty Years' War, in particular 1634, the number of citizens decreased from 130 to 32, the number of houses fell from 111 to 22" “. In the following wars of succession Möglingen was again severely damaged. 1693 French troops destroyed 35 houses, including the town hall.

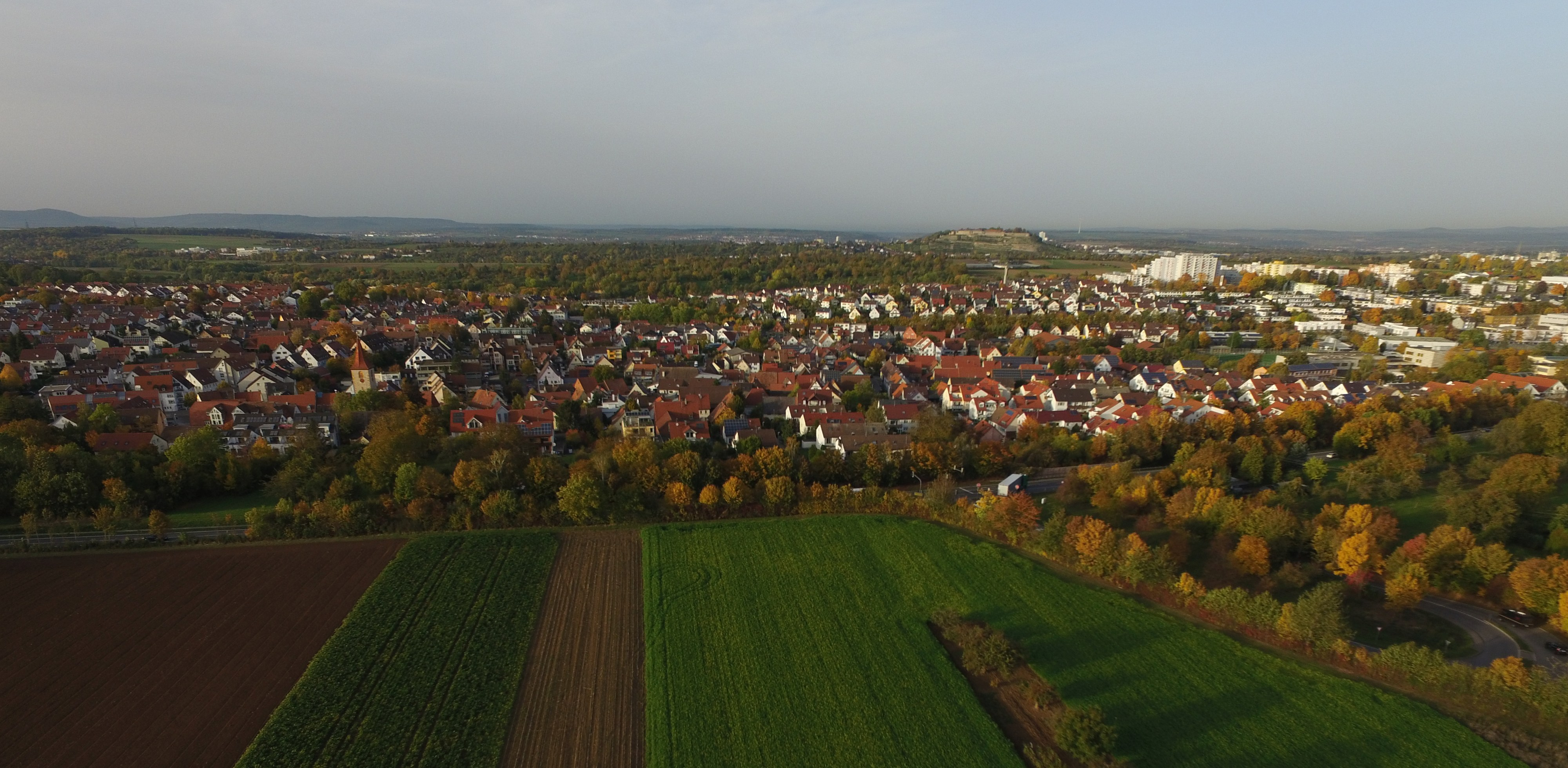
Panorama of Möglingen, 22 Oktober 2020

== Demographics ==
Population development:

Year	Inhabitants
1970	6,943
1987	9,981
2011	4,171
