= Nikolaos Boutakoglou =

German politician (born 1983)

Member of the Landtag of Baden-Württemberg
- Incumbent
- Assumed office 11 May 2026

Personal details
- Born: 1983 (age 42–43)
- Party: Alternative for Germany (since 2017)
- Other political affiliations: Christian Democratic Union (2009–2015)

Nikolaos Boutakoglou (born 1983) is a Greek-born German politician who was elected member of the Landtag of Baden-Württemberg in 2026. He is the chairman of the Alternative for Germany in Vaihingen an der Enz.
