= Asperg =

German city

- Town
- Coat of arms

- Location of Asperg within Ludwigsburg district
- Interactive map of Asperg
- Location within Germany Location within Baden-Württemberg
- Coordinates: 48°54′N 9°8′E
- Country: Germany
- State: Baden-Württemberg
- Admin. region: Stuttgart
- District: Ludwigsburg

Area
  - Total: 5.8 km^{2} (2.2 sq mi)
- Elevation: 270 m (890 ft)

Population (2025-12-31)
  - Total: 13,695
  - Density: 2,400/km^{2} (6,100/sq mi)
- Time zone: UTC+01:00 (CET)
  - Summer (DST): UTC+02:00 (CEST)
- Postal codes: 71673–71679
- Dialling codes: 07141
- Vehicle registration: LB
- Website: www.asperg.de

Asperg (German pronunciation: [ˈaspɛʁk]) is a town in the district of Ludwigsburg, Baden-Württemberg, Germany.

== History ==
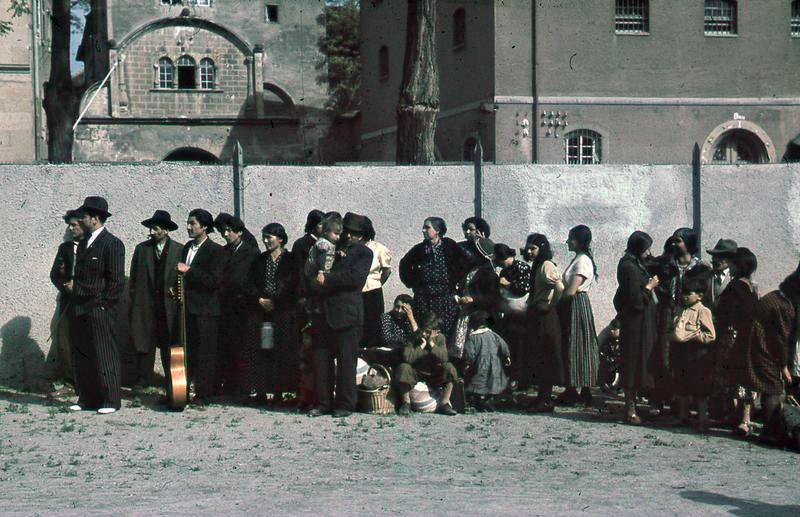
Romani civilians in Asperg rounded up for deportation by the Nazi authorities on 22 May 1940, as part of the Romani genocide.

Asperg was established by the County Palatine of Tübingen, whose ruling house had a cadet named Asperg, around a preexisting castle. The town and castle were sold to the County of Württemberg in 1308, who granted Asperg town rights. In 1510, Ulrich, Duke of Württemberg gave Asperg Tübingen's town charter, and the town retained it until 1715.

== Geography ==
The city (Stadt) of Asperg covers 5.38 square kilometers (2.08 sq mi) of the district of Ludwigsburg, in Baden-Württemberg, one of the 16 States of the Federal Republic of Germany. Asperg is physically located in the basin of the Neckar river. Elevation above sea level in the municipal area ranges from a low of 241 meters (791 ft) Normalnull (NN) to a high of 352 meters (1,155 ft) NN.

== Politics ==
Asperg has one borough, Asperg, and six villages: Altach, Hohenasperg, Lehenfeld, Osterholz, Schöckinger, and Silberhälden. The abandoned village of Weihenberg is also located in the municipal area.

=== Coat of arms ===
Asperg's coat of arms displays a green aspen tree growing out of a green, three-pointed hill and flanked by two black stag antlers. The aspen tree references the name "Asperg", while the antlers are taken from coat of arms of Württemberg and have flanked the tree since the 19th century in local seals. This coat of arms was derived from a colored drawing from 1593 that would later, in 1933, dictate the colors of the municipal flag.

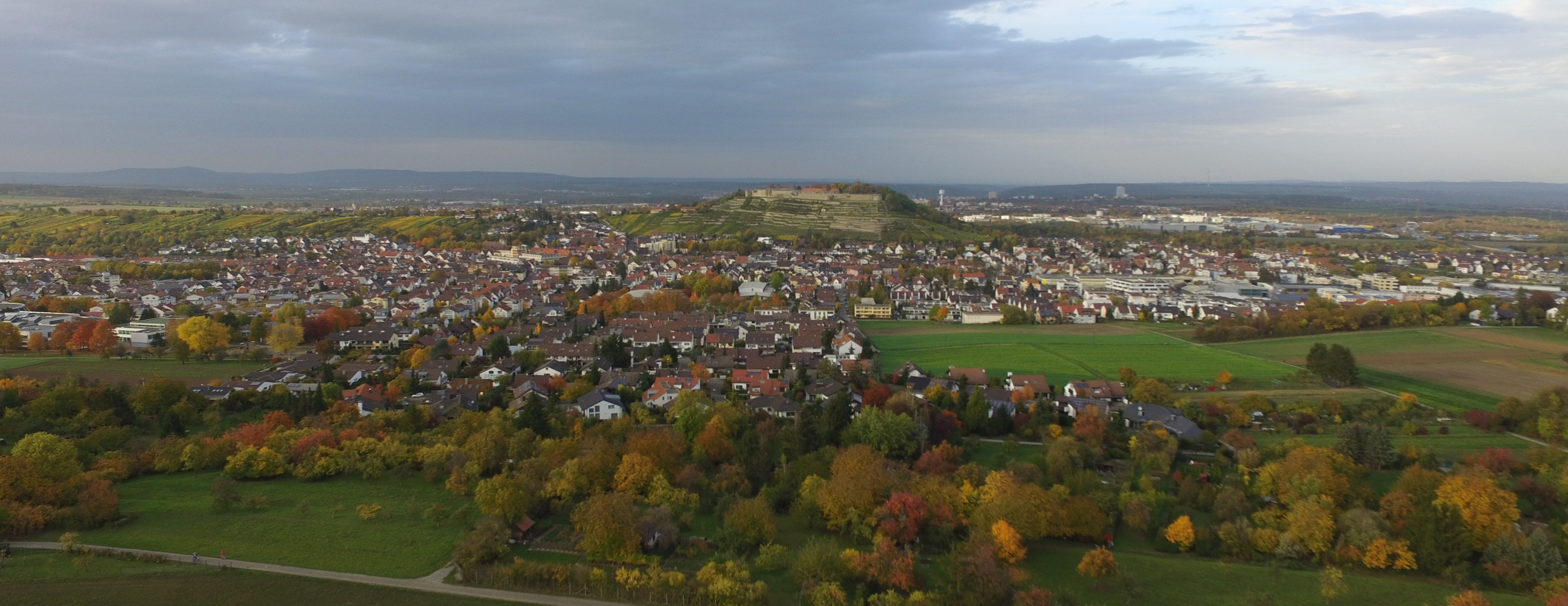
Panorama of Asperg, 22 Oktober 2020

== Asperger ==
The name of physician Hans Asperger indicates his having had a family connection to Asperg, though the man himself was born and lived in Austria. Thus, the well-known Asperger syndrome is indirectly named for the city.
