= Gerlingen =

- Town
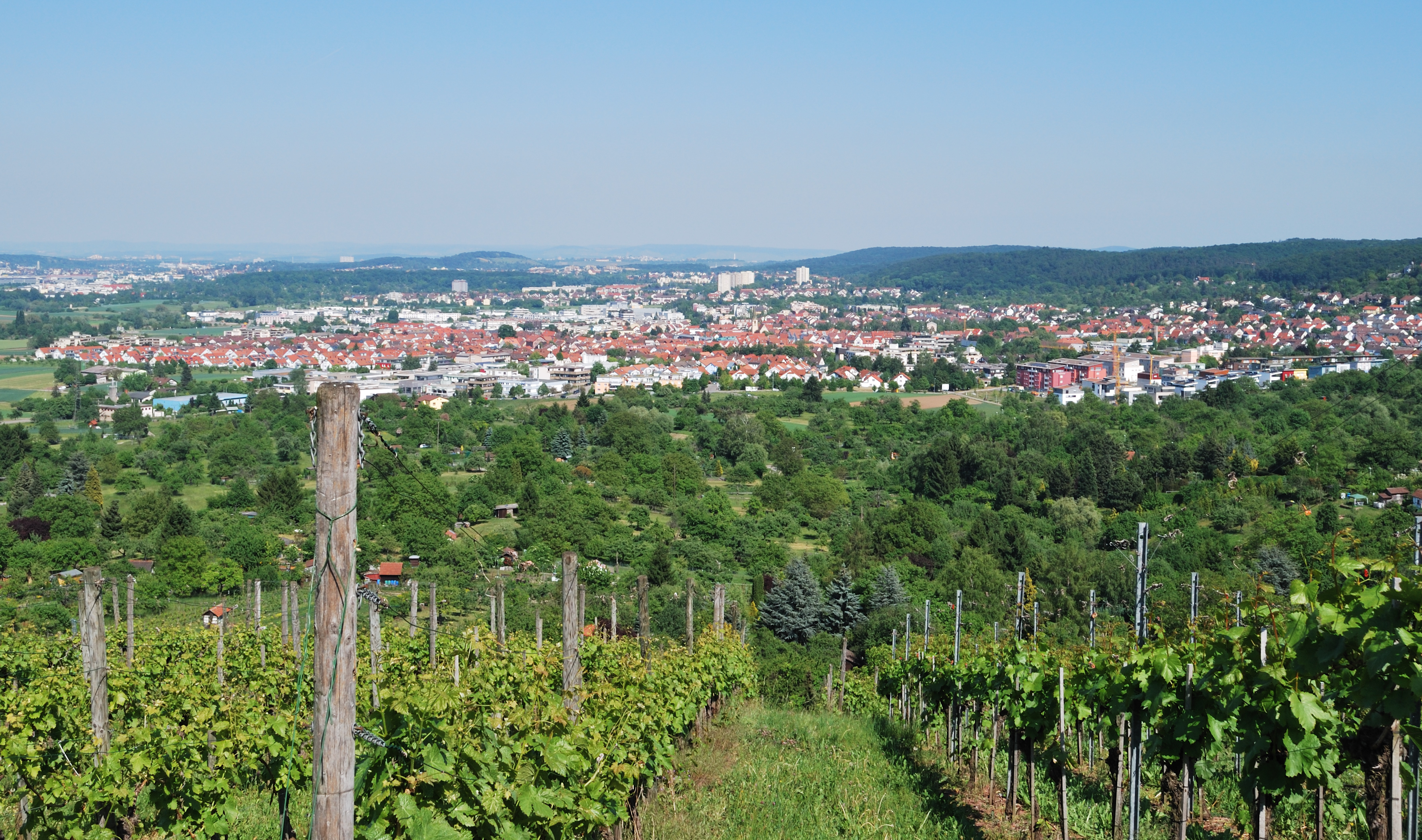
- View of Gerlingen

- Coat of arms

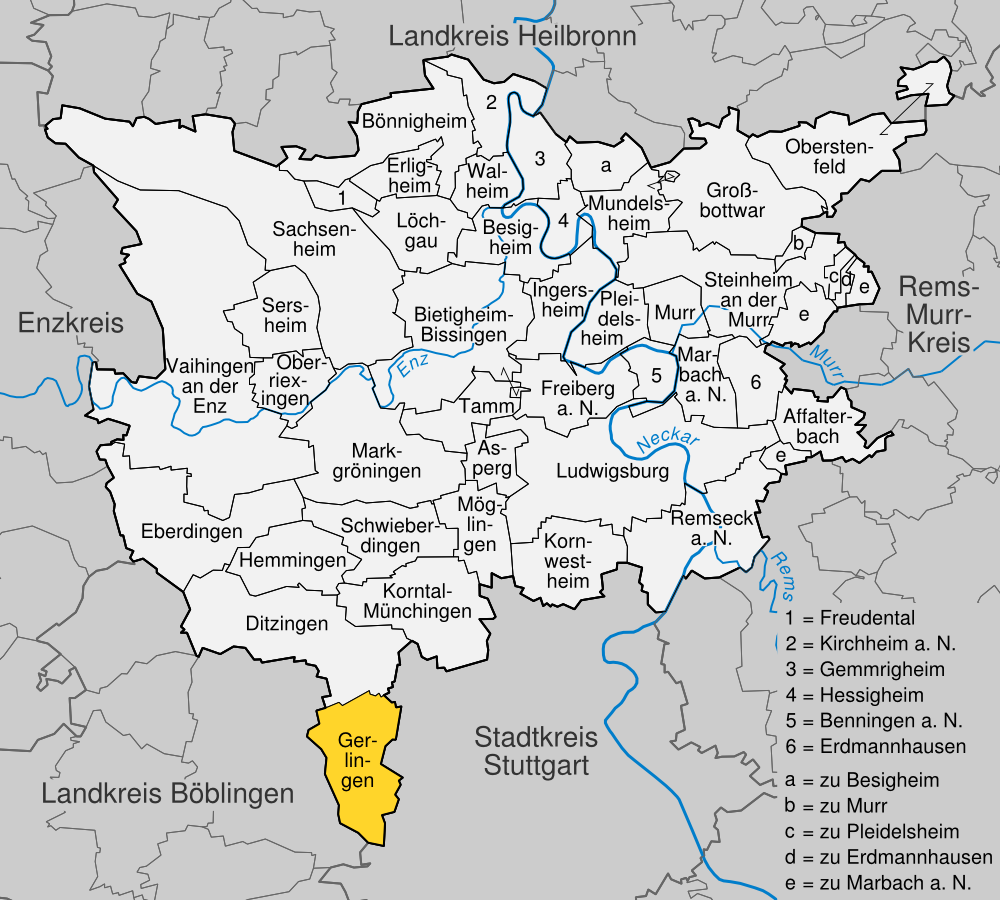
- Location of Gerlingen within Ludwigsburg district
- Interactive map of Gerlingen
- Location within Germany Location within Baden-Württemberg
- Coordinates: 48°48′0″N 9°3′55″E
- Country: Germany
- State: Baden-Württemberg
- Admin. region: Stuttgart
- District: Ludwigsburg

Government
  - Mayor (2019–27): Dirk Oestringer (Ind.)

Area
  - Total: 17.01 km^{2} (6.57 sq mi)
- Elevation: 336 m (1,102 ft)

Population (2025-12-31)
  - Total: 18,307
  - Density: 1,076/km^{2} (2,787/sq mi)
- Time zone: UTC+01:00 (CET)
  - Summer (DST): UTC+02:00 (CEST)
- Postal codes: 70839
- Dialling codes: 07156
- Vehicle registration: LB
- Website: www.gerlingen.de

Gerlingen (German pronunciation: [ˈɡɛʁlɪŋən]; Swabian: Gaerlenge) is a town in the district of Ludwigsburg, Baden-Württemberg, Germany. It is situated 9 km (5.6 mi) west of Stuttgart, and 15 km (9.3 mi) southwest of Ludwigsburg. Gerlingen is home to the headquarters of Bosch, a major engineering and electronics company.

== Geography ==
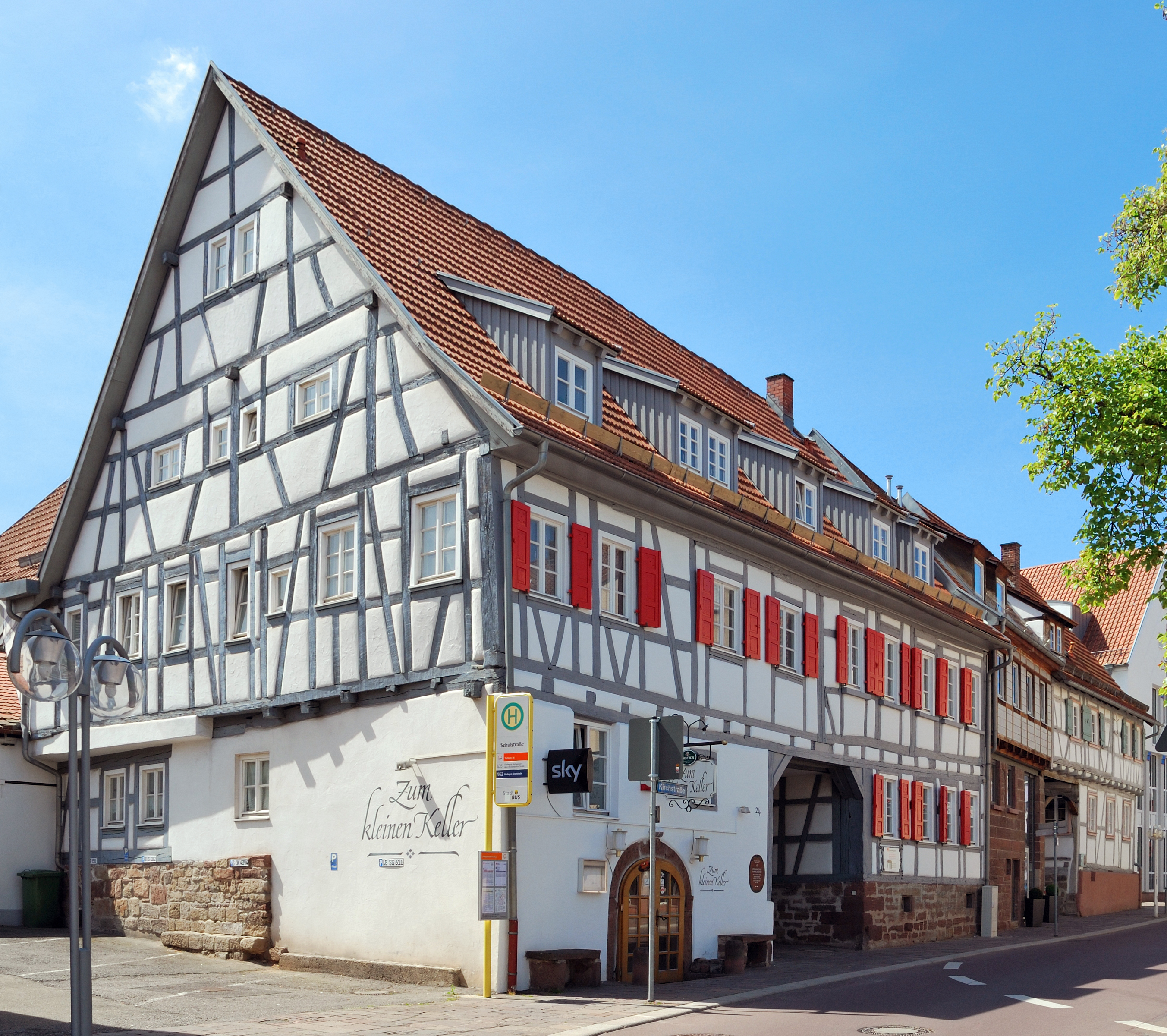
Half timbered house

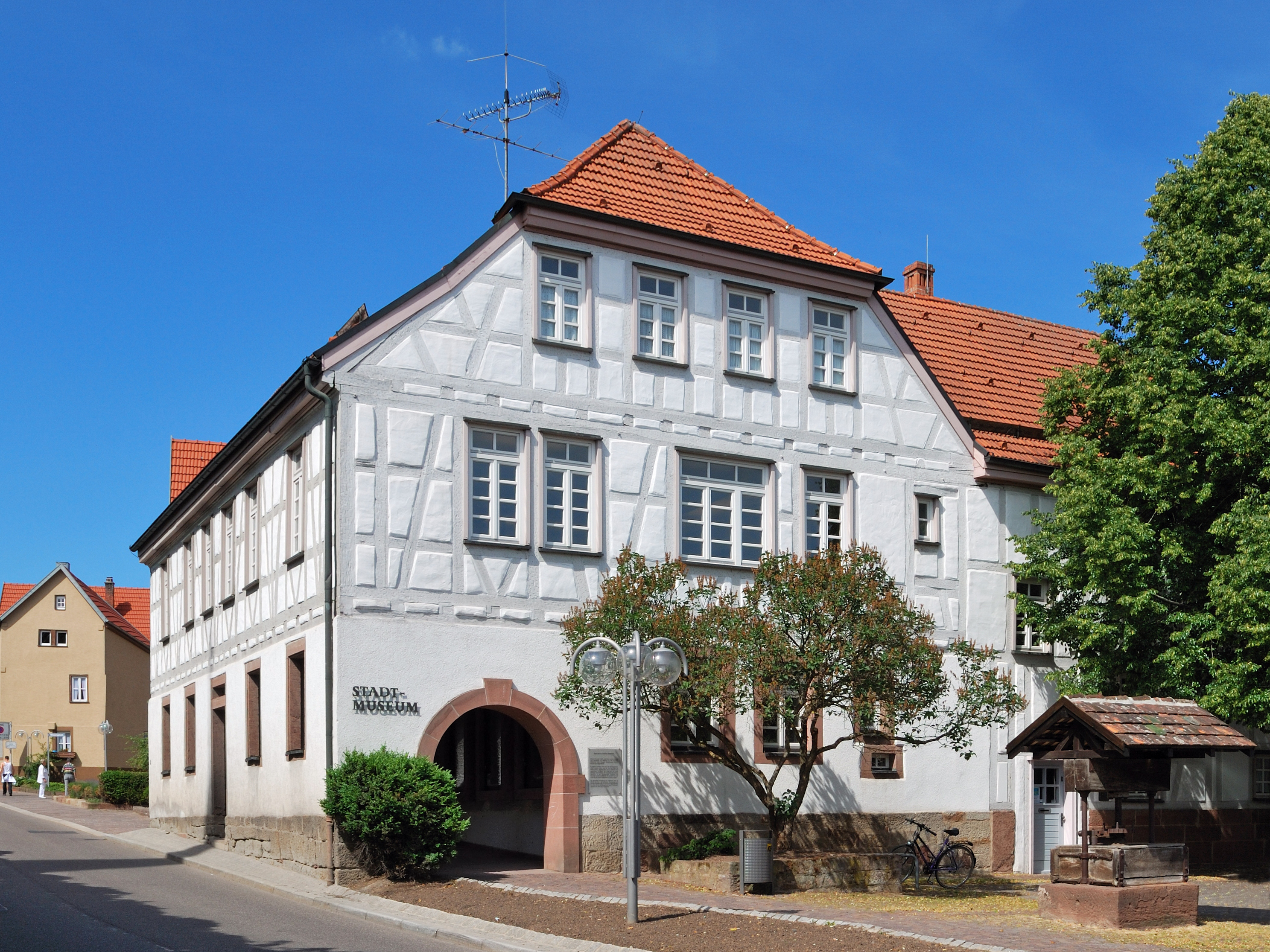
Local museum Gerlingen

Gerlingen is the southernmost district of Ludwigsburg, neighboring the town of Ditzingen to the north, the district of Stuttgart to the east, and the town of Leonberg to the west.

The urban area is split between two distinct parts. In the north, a part of the Neckar Basin which is predominantly agricultural. In the south, the Gelmswald and hills to the western border with Leonberg.

== History ==
=== Early history ===
Paleolithic history is largely unknown beyond three pieces of mammoth tooth found during a construction project in 1955. Evidence of Linear pottery culture of the early Neolithic were found in 1972 when potsherds as well as other rocks, bones, and fire equipment were found.

== Twin towns ==
- Vesoul, France (1964)
- Tata, Hungary (1987)
- Seaham, United Kingdom (1988)

=== Sons and daughters of the city ===
- Johannes Rebmann (1820-1876), missionary, linguist and geographer, 1848 "Discoverer" of Kilimanjaro
- Rainer Wieland (born 1957), lawyer and politician (CDU), Vice-President of the European Parliament
- Smudo (born 1968), birth name Michael Schmidt, singer of the band Die Fantastischen Vier
- Laurents Hörr (born 1997), racing driver
- Franz Böhm (director) (born 1997), film director
