= Sersheim =

- Municipality
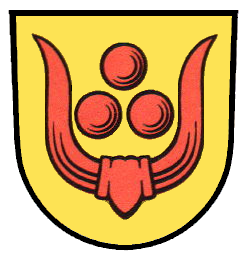
- Coat of arms

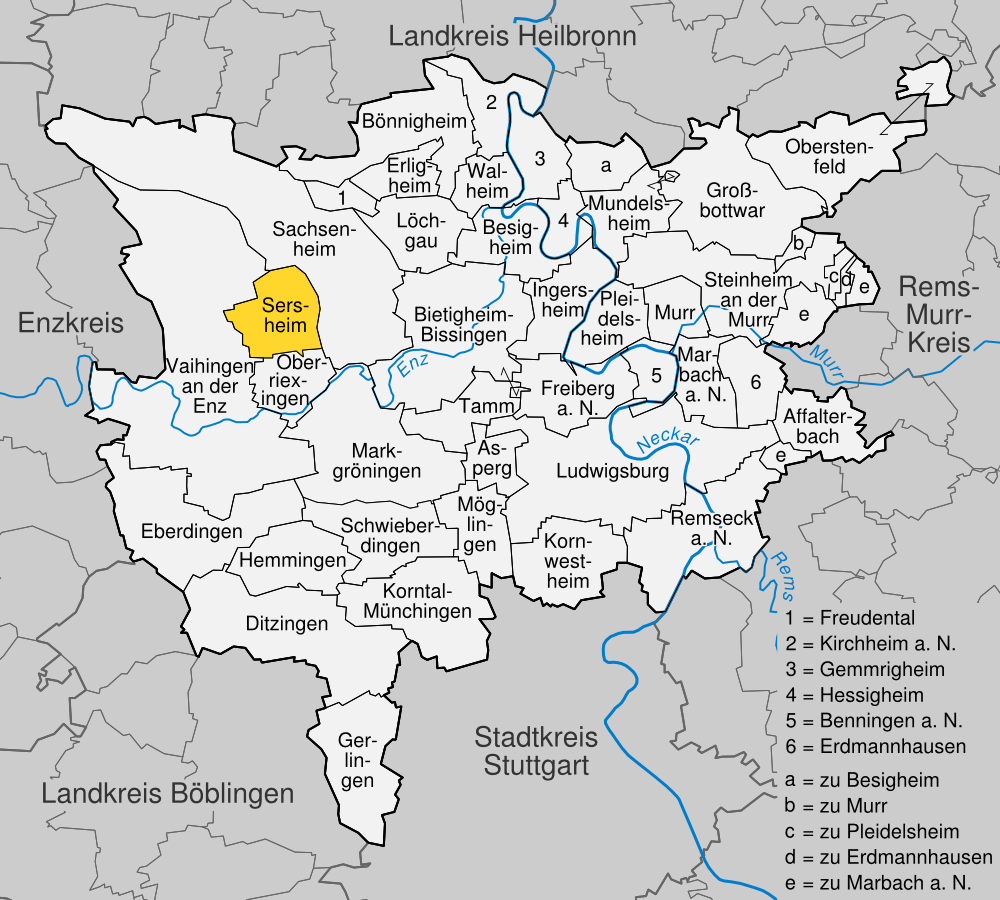
- Location of Sersheim within Ludwigsburg district
- Interactive map of Sersheim
- Location within Germany Location within Baden-Württemberg
- Coordinates: 48°57′33″N 09°00′59″E
- Country: Germany
- State: Baden-Württemberg
- Admin. region: Stuttgart
- District: Ludwigsburg

Government
  - Mayor (2022–30): Jürgen Scholz

Area
  - Total: 11.48 km^{2} (4.43 sq mi)
- Elevation: 217 m (712 ft)

Population (2025-12-31)
  - Total: 5,405
  - Density: 470.8/km^{2} (1,219/sq mi)
- Time zone: UTC+01:00 (CET)
  - Summer (DST): UTC+02:00 (CEST)
- Postal codes: 74372
- Dialling codes: 07042
- Vehicle registration: LB
- Website: www.sersheim.de

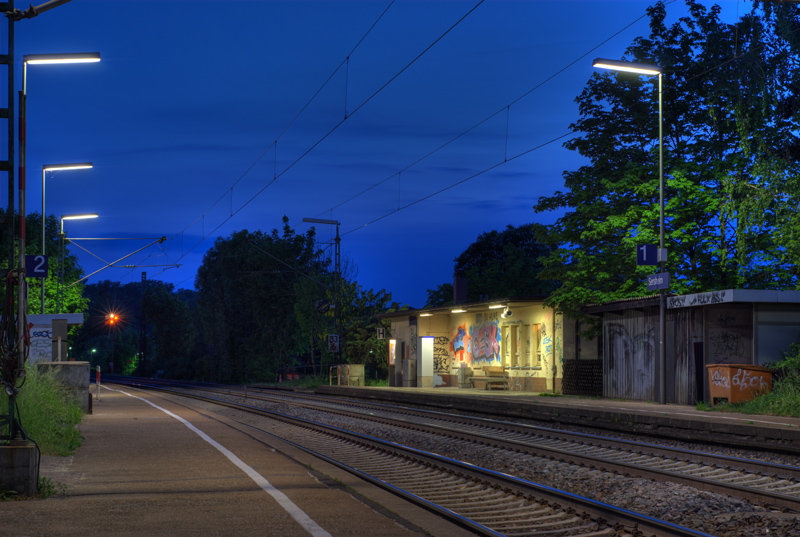
Train station in Sersheim

Sersheim (German pronunciation: [ˈsɛʁsˌhaɪ̯m]) is a municipality in the district of Ludwigsburg in Baden-Württemberg in Germany.
