= Oberriexingen =

- Town
- Coat of arms

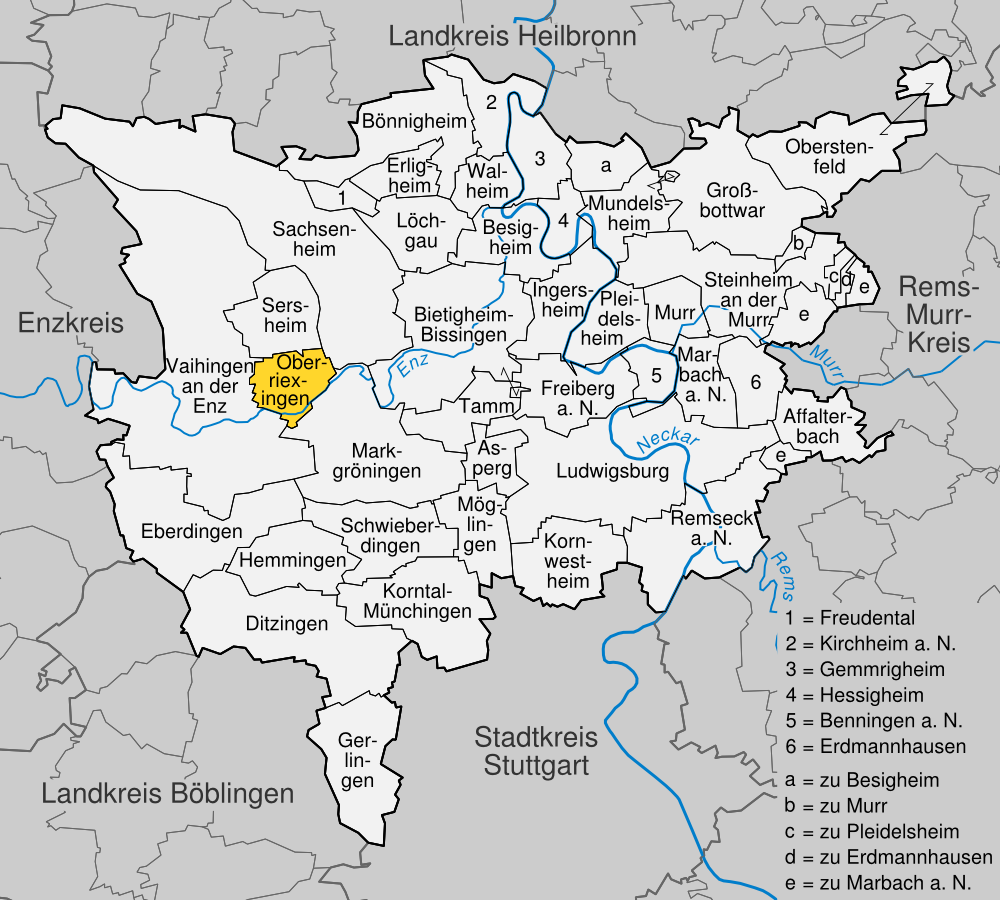
- Location of Oberriexingen within Ludwigsburg district
- Interactive map of Oberriexingen
- Location within Germany Location within Baden-Württemberg
- Coordinates: 48°55′32″N 9°1′41″E
- Country: Germany
- State: Baden-Württemberg
- Admin. region: Stuttgart
- District: Ludwigsburg

Government
  - Mayor (2017–25): Frank Wittendorfer

Area
  - Total: 8.16 km^{2} (3.15 sq mi)
- Elevation: 203 m (666 ft)

Population (2025-12-31)
  - Total: 3,347
  - Density: 410/km^{2} (1,060/sq mi)
- Time zone: UTC+01:00 (CET)
  - Summer (DST): UTC+02:00 (CEST)
- Postal codes: 71739
- Dialling codes: 07042
- Vehicle registration: LB
- Website: www.oberriexingen.de

Oberriexingen (German: [oːbɐˈʁiːksɪŋən], lit. 'Upper Riexingen', in contrast to "Lower Riexingen") is a town in the district of Ludwigsburg, Baden-Württemberg, Germany. It is situated on the river Enz, 20 km northwest of Stuttgart, and 13 km west of Ludwigsburg.
