= Eberdingen =

German municipality

- Municipality
- Coat of arms

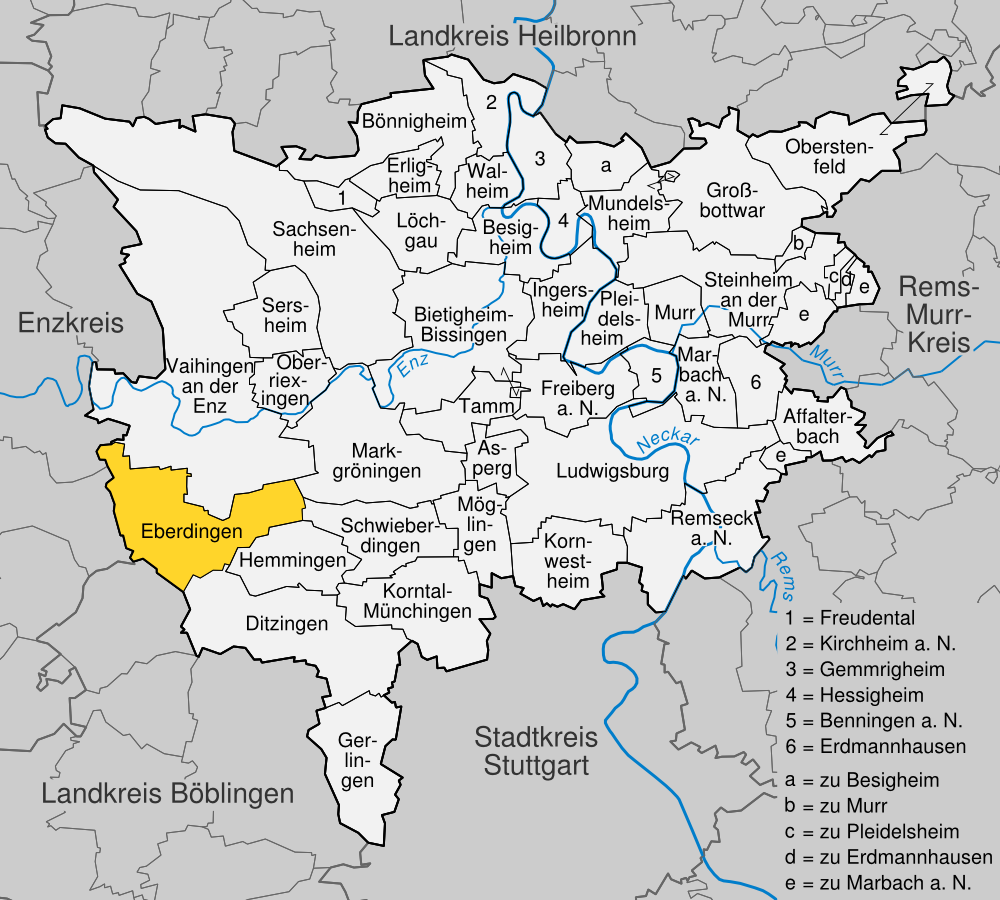
- Location of Eberdingen within Ludwigsburg district
- Interactive map of Eberdingen
- Location within Germany Location within Baden-Württemberg
- Coordinates: 48°52′46″N 8°57′55″E
- Country: Germany
- State: Baden-Württemberg
- Admin. region: Stuttgart
- District: Ludwigsburg

Government
  - Mayor (2023–31): Carsten Willing

Area
  - Total: 26.21 km^{2} (10.12 sq mi)
- Elevation: 272 m (892 ft)

Population (2025-12-31)
  - Total: 6,820
  - Density: 260/km^{2} (674/sq mi)
- Time zone: UTC+01:00 (CET)
  - Summer (DST): UTC+02:00 (CEST)
- Postal codes: 71735
- Dialling codes: 07042
- Vehicle registration: LB
- Website: www.eberdingen.de

Eberdingen (German pronunciation: [ˈeːbɐˌdɪŋən]) is a municipality in the district of Ludwigsburg in Baden-Württemberg, Germany.

== History ==
In the 6th century BC, a Celtic chieftain was buried in a mound near Hochdorf. See: Hochdorf Chieftain's Grave.

All three main villages of the municipality were founded in the Middle Ages around agricultural areas, owned by convents.

Nussdorf suffered heavy war damage in April, 1945, during fierce fights between French and German troops at the end of the World War II.

The municipality of Eberdingen was created in 1975 by the merging of the municipalities of Eberdingen, Hochdorf an der Enz, and Nussdorf.

== Geography ==
The municipality (Gemeinde) of Eberdingen is located at the western extremity of the district of Ludwigsburg, in the German state of Baden-Württemberg, along its border with the districts of Böblingen and the Enz. Eberdingen is physically located in the basin of the Neckar. Elevation above sea level in the municipal area ranges from a high of 409 meters (1,342 ft) Normalnull (NN) to a low of 246 meters (807 ft) NN.

== Politics ==
Eberdingen has three boroughs (Ortsteile) – Eberdingen, Hochdorf, and Nussdorf – and four villages: Amphertal, Schillerhöhe, Sonnenberg, Sorgenmühle. The abandoned village of Hohenscheid is also located in the municipal area.

=== Coat of arms ===
Eberdingen's coat of arms displays three red roses with five green sepals growing out of a green, three-pointed hill upon a field of yellow. This coat of arms was derived from a 16th century court seal and selected specifically to represent the three municipalities that formed Eberdingen. It was approved and a corresponding municipal flag issued by the Ludwigsburg district office on 10 May 1977.

== Transportation ==
Eberdingen is connected to Germany's network of roadways by its local Landesstraßen and Kreisstraßen. Local public transportation is provided by the Verkehrs- und Tarifverbund Stuttgart.
