= Hemmingen =

- Town
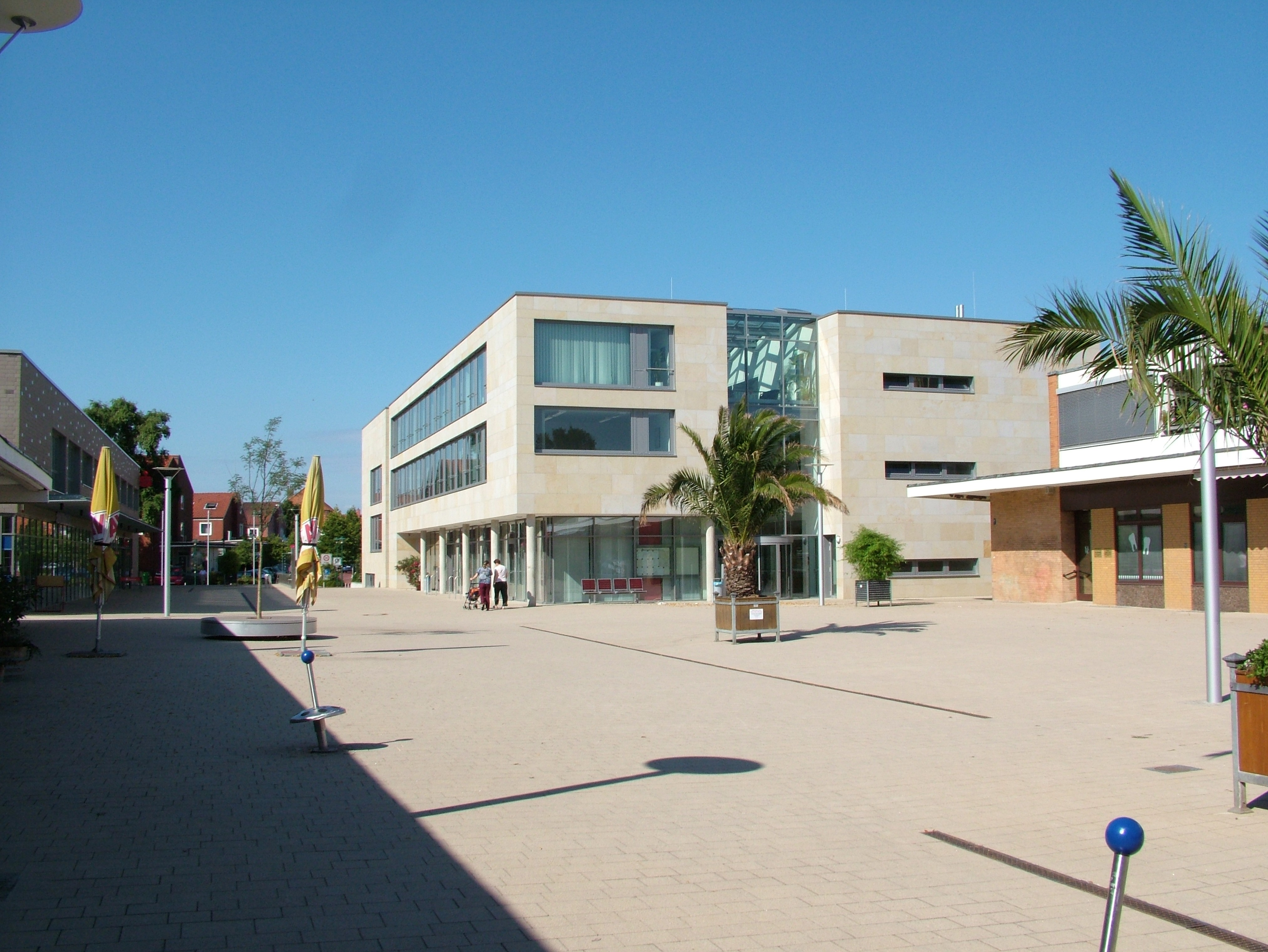
- Townhall in Hemmingen

- Coat of arms

- Location of Hemmingen within Hanover district
- Interactive map of Hemmingen
- Location within Germany Location within Lower Saxony
- Coordinates: 52°19′25″N 9°43′32″E
- Country: Germany
- State: Lower Saxony
- District: Hanover
- Subdivisions: 7 districts

Government
  - Mayor (2021–26): Jan Christoph Dingeldey (CDU)

Area
  - Total: 31.73 km^{2} (12.25 sq mi)
- Elevation: 56 m (184 ft)

Population (2025-12-31)
  - Total: 18,815
  - Density: 593.0/km^{2} (1,536/sq mi)
- Time zone: UTC+01:00 (CET)
  - Summer (DST): UTC+02:00 (CEST)
- Postal codes: 30953–30966
- Dialling codes: 0511 / 05101
- Vehicle registration: H
- Website: www.stadthemmingen.de

Hemmingen (German pronunciation: [ˈhɛmɪŋən]) is a town in the district of Hanover, in Lower Saxony, Germany. It is situated approximately 6 km south of Hanover.

Until December 2004, Hemmingen belonged to the Regierungsbezirk Hannover, which was dissolved in January 2005.

== Districts ==
Hemmingen is divided into 7 districts:

- Arnum
- Devese
- Harkenbleck
- Hemmingen-Westerfeld
- Hiddestorf
- Ohlendorf
- Wilkenburg

== Education ==
Hemmingen has 3 primary schools and one comprehensive school.

== Twin towns – sister cities ==
Hemmingen is twinned with:

- Murowana Goślina, Poland
- South Lanarkshire, Scotland, United Kingdom
- Yvetot, France
