= Kreuzbach =

Kreuzbach may refer to:

- Kreuzbach (Strudelbach), a river of Baden-Württemberg, Germany, tributary of the Strudelbach
- Kreuzbach (Erlenbach), a river of North Rhine-Westphalia, Germany, tributary of the Erlenbach
