= Riet, Germany =

Riet
- Ortsteil of Vaihingen an der Enz
- Coat of arms
- Interactive map of Riet
- Location within Germany Location within Baden-Württemberg
- Coordinates: 48°53′35″N 8°58′15″E
- Country: Germany
- State: Baden-Württemberg
- Admin. region: Stuttgart
- District: Ludwigsburg
- Town: Vaihingen an der Enz

Population
  - Total: 956
- Time zone: UTC+01:00 (CET)
  - Summer (DST): UTC+02:00 (CEST)

Riet is a village in the town of Vaihingen an der Enz, Germany. The population is around 900, and it is about 5 kilometres (3.1 mi) south of central Vaihingen.

== Geography ==
=== Location ===
Riet is located in a valley which runs in a south–north direction on the Strudelbach, a southern tributary of the Enz. While previously located near the center of the old district of Vaihingen, due to a district reform it is now on the western edge of the district of Ludwigsburg.

Riet lies on the German Timber-Frame Road.

=== Surroundings ===
The nearest surrounding villages are Enzweihingen, Hochdorf an der Enz, Eberdingen, and Nußdorf. The landscape is characterized by a deep valley, deciduous and mixed forests, and steppe heath. Agriculture occupies a relatively small part of the area.

Around the village, terraced vineyards are planted on the steep slopes, which today are mostly overgrown and only occasionally cultivated voluntarily by locals.

== History ==
=== Origins ===
Celtic burial mounds in the Riet district provide evidence that the area was settled as early as the first millennium B.C.E. There is also evidence of later Roman settlement. The first documented mention of Riet is found in the Lorsch Codex as Villa Reoth (or village of Riet) for a donation towards the Lorsch Monastery.

The origin of the village's name is not certain. A linguistic shift from Villa Roth is possible, as well as the modification from Ried as a reference to an area that was originally marshy. Or the modification of Reuth or Reutte as a reference to the clearing of a forest area, which is most likely, given the type of terrain and vegetation.

=== Riet in medieval times ===
In 1188, a castrum (eng.:castle) Riet is mentioned in a contract between Emperor Frederick I Barbarossa and King Alfonso VIII of Castile, in which the marriage between Frederick's son Konrad and Alfonso's daughter Berengaria was agreed. This castle, believed to be in Riet near Vaihingen, was part of the bride's morning gift along with another 29 Hohenstaufen estates. However, this marriage was never put into practice. Strudelbach in Riet In Riet, in addition to the today still preserved, inhabited, and once moated castle, there were three other castles. One was located approximately on the site of today's community center on the village square. Remains of foundation walls found during construction work suggest that the other two castles stood at the southern and northern ends of today's Paracelsus Street.

Riet is historically connected to Eberdingen and Nußdorf via the noble family of the Counts of Reischach, who were owners of Riet for several times over a long part of its history.

The village of Riet was inhabited mainly by servants of the castles, who also cultivated the vineyards of the castle estate. Therefore, other agriculture (farming, animal husbandry) never played a significant role.

From the 14th century, Riet belonged to the bailiwick of Vaihingen and its successors Oberamt, Kreis, and so on, and was incorporated into Vaihingen in 1973.

=== Riet in the Industrial Age ===
After the castles and noble houses ceased to be the main employers, the citizens of Rieter oriented themselves strongly towards the new industrial centers of Vaihingen and the greater Stuttgart area. The Flattich haulage company, which had been established in the village in the 1920s, provided good transport links.

On February 1, 1972, Riet was incorporated into the city of Vaihingen an der Enz.

=== Coat of arms ===
The former municipal coat of arms of Riet depicts a lying golden stag on a black shield head, below on a golden shield a sloping black small hoe.

The stag shows the affiliation to Württemberg, the small hoe refers to the history of Riet as a wine village.

The coat of arms in its present form and the blue-yellow flag were awarded in 1966.

In a service seal from the 1920s, the coat of arms of Riet is depicted with three stags.

== Infrastructure ==
=== Economy ===
Riet not only provides skilled workers for nearby large companies such as Bosch or Behr, several companies also settled in Riet. Among the largest are the bus company Flattich, the company Holzbau Leibfried, the forwarding agencies Hauser and Munz, and until 2003 the aluminum foundry and stamping company Hauser. In addition, there are several small craft businesses and commercial enterprises (e.g. beverage market, village store, farm store, flower store).

Well known far beyond Riet was the Gasthaus zur Eintracht, an inn and restaurant, on the village square. The second restaurant in the village is the restaurant Zum Strudelbächle.

=== Public life ===
There is a kindergarten and an elementary school in the village. A citizens' office as a branch of the town hall is located on the village square.

=== Clubs and communities of interest ===
Riet has several clubs, some with a long history, including the sports club SV Riet e. V.

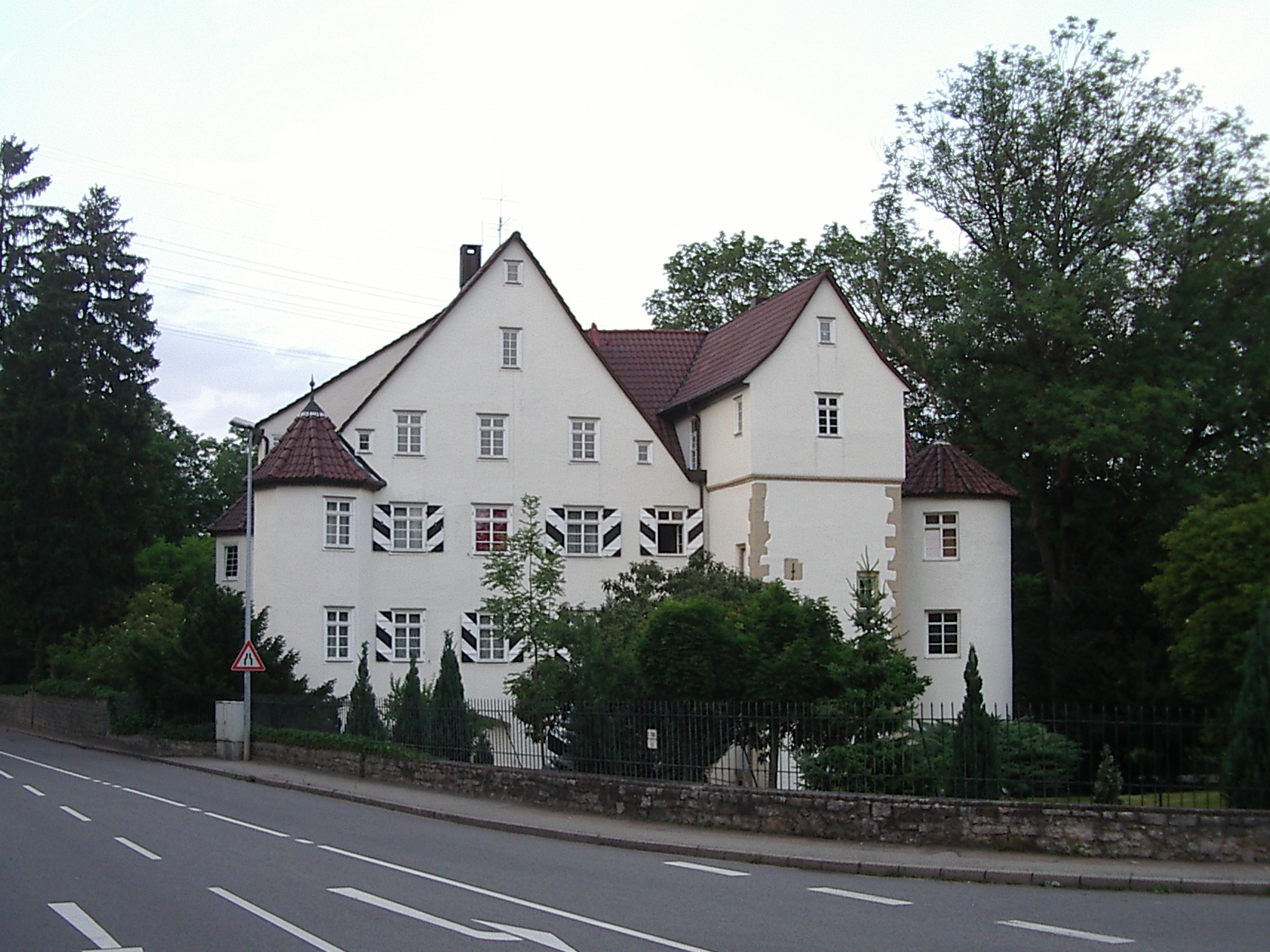
Castle Riet

== Landmarks ==
=== The castle ===
The castle used to have a circumferential, deep, brick moat, which could be flooded at short notice with water from the Strudelbach stream in an emergency.

During the Second World War, the castle was accommodation for some bombed-out citizens of Pforzheim and Stuttgart, and later also for displaced persons.

=== The parish hall/community center ===
The parish hall, which was the rectory until the 1980s, stands on the site of a former castle of Riet.

=== St. Stephen's Church ===
In the church there is still a wooden column of the Count's chair with the coat of arms of the Lords of Reischach.

=== The pump house ===
The pump house served the water supply of Nußdorf and was designed by Oesterlen&Schmid, Esslingen, in 1902 and built in 1905. At the level of today's Robert-Bosch-Strasse, a 130 m-long (430 ft) water channel made of sheet steel diverted water from the Strudelbach stream and led it to the pump house. There, with a head of approx. 1.5 m (4 ft 11 in), the pump system was operated via a medium-geared water wheel, which pumped around 107 m^{3} (3,800 cu ft) of river water per day to Nußdorf as drinking water at a rate of 2.4 L/s. The water was then pumped into the pump house. In the 1960s, Nußdorf was connected to the public water network and as a result, the pump house was shut down.

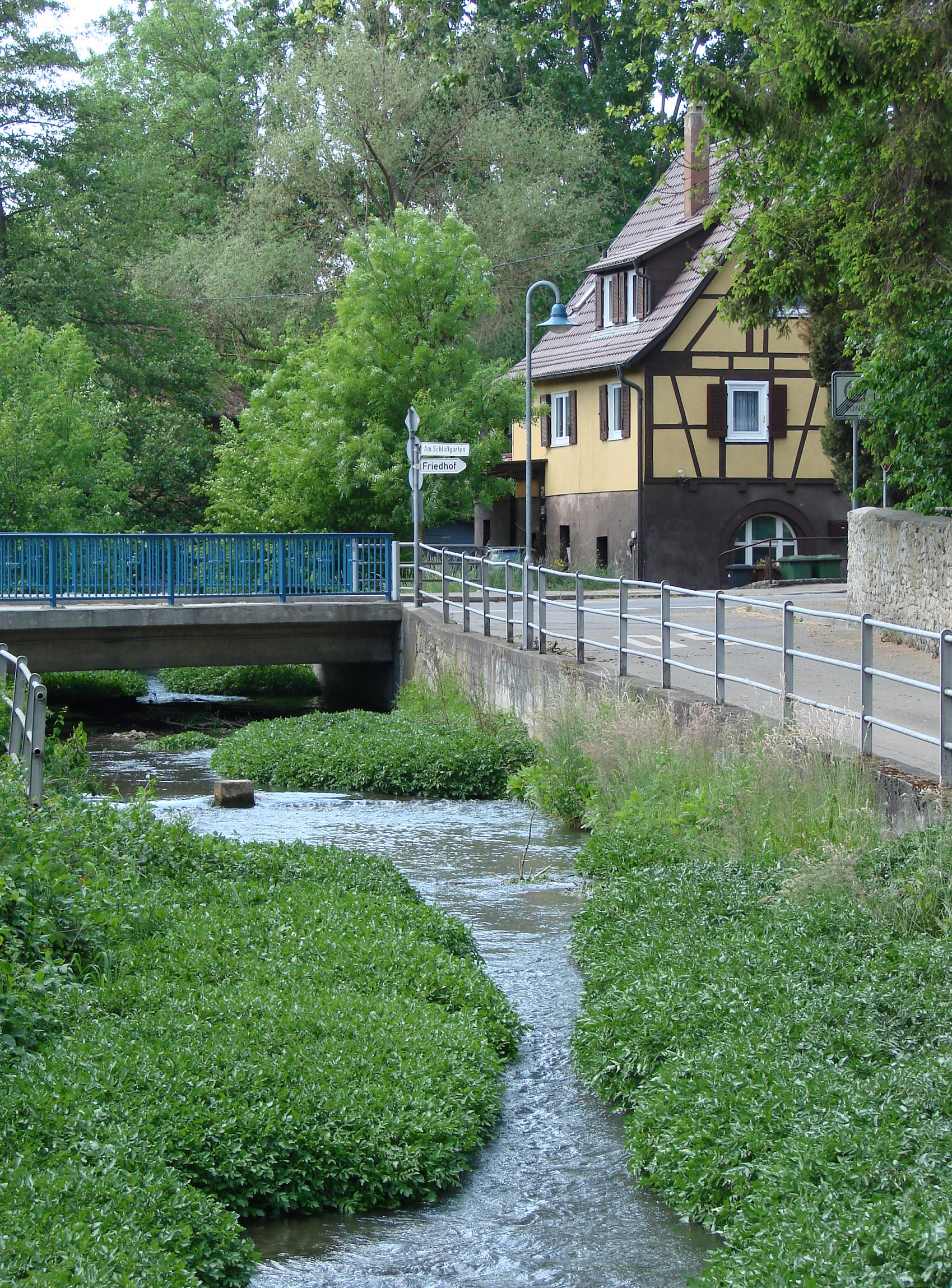
Strudelbach in Riet

Today, the pump house is a popular meeting place and event location of the association Dörfliche Entwicklung Riet DER e. V.

== Famous names ==
Wilhelm von Hohenheim von Riet, physician, father of Theophrastus Bombastus Paracelsus. Paracelsus himself is said to have lived with his uncle in Riet for several years.

Kimsy von Reischach, former MTV Europe presenter, lives with her husband Marcus Lambkin (also known as DJ Shit Robot) in the parental castle Riet.

== Literature ==
- Rieth. In: Karl Eduard Paulus (ed.): Beschreibung des Oberamts Vaihingen (= Die Württembergischen Oberamtsbeschreibungen 1824–1886. Vol. 37). Eduard Hallberger, Stuttgart 1856, pp. 214–220 (full text [Wikisource]).

== Links ==
Commons: Riet – Collection of images, videos and audio files

- Riet from then until now
