= Staden (disambiguation) =

Staden is a municipality located in the Belgian province of West Flanders.

Staden may also refer to:

== Places ==
- Staden, Derbyshire, England
- Van Stadens River, South African river
- Van Stadens Bridge, a bridge over Van Stadens River
- Freetown Christiania in Copenhagen, Denmark, commonly referred to by the nickname Staden

== People ==
- Alexandra Staden, British actress
- Berndt von Staden (1919–2014), German diplomat
- Hans Staden (1525–1579), 16th-century German soldier, author of a famous captivity narrative
- Heinrich von Staden (author) (born 1542), 16th-century German spy in Russia
- Heinrich von Staden (historian) (born 1939), South African historian and classical scholar
- Johann Staden (1581–1634), 17th-century German composer
- Rudi von Staden, co-founder of Ungana-Afrika
- Sigmund Theophil Staden (1607–1655), son of Johann Staden
- Wendelgard von Staden (1925–2026), German diplomat and author, wife of Berndt

== Other ==
- Staden Package, open source software for DNA sequence assembly
