= Darkness Over the Valley: Growing Up in Nazi Germany =

1979 German autobiography

Darkness Over the Valley: Growing Up in Nazi Germany (German: Nacht über dem Tal) is the autobiographical account of Wendelgard von Staden's youth originally published in German in 1979.

== Background ==
Wendelgard von Staden wrote the book in Cape Cod, while her husband was the German ambassador to the United States. She had not initially intended to publish it, saying she wrote it for her children. It went through seven editions in Germany between 1979 and 1981 and was published in English translation in 1981.

== Synopsis ==
In it, she describes the events at her parents' estate in Kleinglattbach, a district of Vaihingen an der Enz. The Wiesengrund concentration camp was built on her father's land, which had been confiscated by the SS. Because the family was allowed to continue using a road that ran through the restricted area for business reasons, family members had a view of what was happening on the concentration camp grounds, where an underground aircraft factory was being built in cooperation with Messerschmitt AG. Von Staden's mother, Irmgard von Neurath, along with her daughter, who had been living with her parents again since mid-1944, tried to help the prisoners, secretly providing them additional food on the Neurath estate. They managed to establish contact with a small group of prisoners, but the mother's plan, in consultation with the camp commander Wilhelm Lautenschlager, to free the prisoners who were still alive as the Allies approached, failed. All those still able to march were transferred to Dachau shortly before the arrival of the French army.

Irmgard von Neurath was arrested after the war. Initially, the mother was held in the district prison, then transferred to a camp on the Asperg (near Stuttgart), where her daughter tried in vain to reach her – in order to speak with one of the former doctors from the Wiesengrund camp, who had written a letter to the military government. Wendelgard was advised to deliver this letter personally to the American headquarters in Frankfurt. She did so, accompanied by her Polish friend "Kuba," one of the former workers on her family's farm. There they were referred to Heidelberg, to the Civilian Internment Camp, the Allied camps for potential war criminals from 1945 onwards, where he was also able to provide further statements. However, they heard nothing further about whether the letter or the statements had been given any consideration until "one day she wandered into the courtyard wearing her old khaki jacket and carrying the same blanket under her arm. She had gained weight and looked cheerful. The Americans had released her from the camp without interrogation, without trial. Nobody had bothered with her at all."

Later, the mother testified as a witness in Rastatt before the French military tribunal in the trial concerning the guards of the Wiesengrund concentration camp. The defendants were Commandant Lautenschlager, camp doctor Adolf Eichmann, and SS members Karl-Friedrich Höcker, Pill, Gerhard Sommer, and Möller – who, even outside the concentration camp, in front of young Wendelgard, did not hesitate to display particularly unpredictable cruelty towards the forced laborers working in the courtyard.

“...and the presiding judge said: ‘As a German, you helped to save civilization and acted with honor and compassion. For this, the court thanks you today.’”
