= Vaihingen an der Enz concentration camp =

Slave labour camp in southern Germany

Coordinates: 48.945314°N 8.9539°E

Vaihingen an der Enz (officially named Wiesengrund) concentration camp, near the city of Vaihingen an der Enz in the Neckar region of Germany, was a slave labor camp for armament manufacturing built by the Todt organization. In the end phase of the war it became a concentration camp for sick and dying prisoners.

The camp was built in late 1943 – early 1944 as part of a secret program known as Stoffel to relocate Messerschmitt manufacturing plants underground, protected from Allied bombing raids. These underground facilities were constructed in conjunction with the quarries in the area. Originally an annex to the concentration camp at Natzweiler-Struthof, it was inhabited by a group of 2,189 Jewish prisoners from the Radom Ghetto in Poland.

These and subsequent prisoners were put to work in the quarry, carrying stone, rubble, sand, and grit. The prisoners were worked 12 hours a day on starvation diets, and mortality rates were high. They were accommodated in four houses sharing one latrine. The camp was heavily guarded with double barbed wire, watchtowers, and SS troops.

By the fall of 1944 operation Stoffel was abandoned and most of the prisoners reassigned to other camps, notably Bisingen, Hessental, Dautmergen, or Unterriexingen. The Wiesengrund camp retained some slave laborers, but became a destination for sick prisoners who were effectively left there to die. A fifth structure was erected to serve as an infirmary. 2,442 seriously ill prisoners arrived between November 1944 and March 1945, and the mortality rate increased dramatically, to 33 deaths a day. An epidemic of typhus made conditions considerably worse.

With the approach of the French army, on 5 April 1945, the SS sent many prisoners on a forced march to the Dachau concentration camp. The same day 16 Norwegian prisoners were rescued by the Swedish Red Cross. One of those prisoners was Trygve Bratteli, who later became a politician and served as prime minister of Norway, 1971–72 and 1973–76. On 7 April the camp was formally liberated by the 1st French army. Even so, another 92 prisoners died after liberation from lingering typhus and/or general ill health.

Corpses in large common graves were exhumed after the war and reinterred in a memorial gravesite near the camp, which was officially opened on 2 November 1958.

Camp officials were charged and put on trial by the French military tribunal. Ten were condemned to death, and eight were sentenced to terms of hard labor.

== Literature ==
- KZ-Gedenkstätte Vaihingen/Enz e. V. (Hrsg.): Das Konzentrationslager Vaihingen/Enz – Vom Arbeitslager zum Sterbelager, Broschüre, 8. überarbeitete Auflage 2014.
- Scheck, Manfred (Hrsg.): Das KZ vor der Haustüre. Augenzeugen berichten über das Konzentrationslager Vaihingen genannt »Wiesengrund«. 4., durchgesehene und erweiterte Aufl. Vaihingen an der Enz 2010.
- Scheck, Manfred: Vaihingen an der Enz (»Wiesengrund«). In: Wolfgang Benz, Barbara Distel (Hrsg.): Der Ort des Terrors. Geschichte der nationalsozialistischen Konzentrationslager, Bd. 6, München 2007, S. 177–181.
- Scheck, Manfred: Zwangsarbeit und Massensterben. Politische Gefangene, Fremdarbeiter und KZ-Häftlinge in Vaihingen an der Enz 1933 bis 1945. Metropol Verlag, Berlin 2014.
- Stegemann, Robert: Das Konzentrationslager Natzweiler-Struthof und seine Außenkommandos an Rhein und Neckar 1941–1945. Metropol, Berlin 2010, ISBN 978-3-940938-58-9.
- von Staden, Wendelgard: Darkness Over the Valley: Growing Up in Nazi Germany. Translated by Mollie Comerford Peters. Ticknor & Fields, 1979, Houghton Mifflin, 1981 ISBN 9780899190099
