= Moorbach =

Moorbach may refer to following rivers:

- Moorbach (Bever), of North Rhine-Westphalia, Germany, tributary of the Bever
- Moorbach (Werfener Bach), of North Rhine-Westphalia, Germany, tributary of the Werfener Bach
