= Strudelbach =

River in Germany

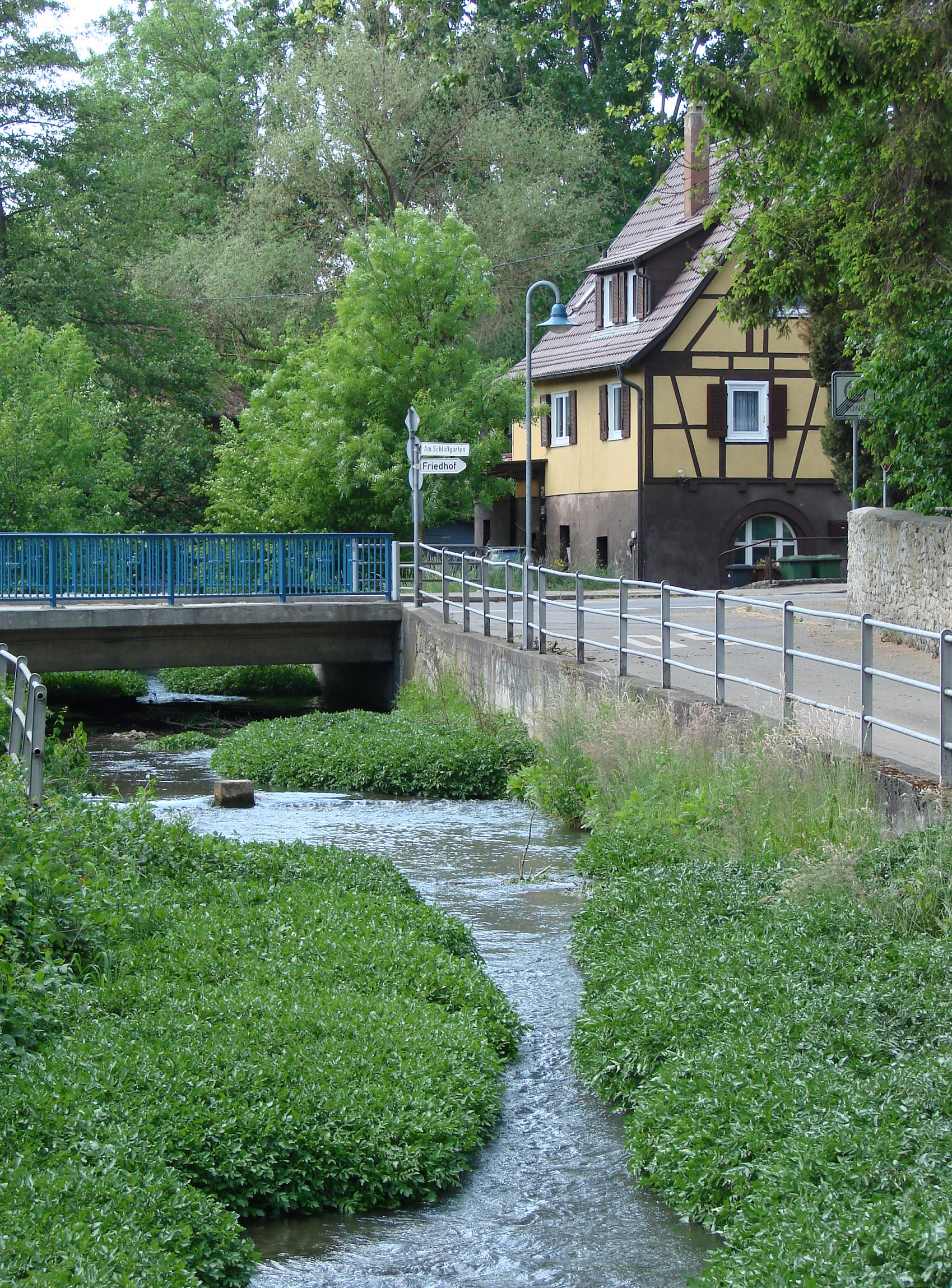
- Strudelbach flowing into Riet

Location
- Country: Germany
- State: Baden-Württemberg

Physical characteristics
- Mouth
  - location: Vaihingen an der Enz
  - coordinates: 48.9205°N 8.9912°E
  - elevation: 200 m (660 ft)
- Length: 15.3 km (9.5 mi)

Basin features
- Progression: Enz→ Neckar→ Rhine→ North Sea
- Tributaries
  - left: Kreuzbach

The Strudelbach is a river of Baden-Württemberg, Germany.

== Geography ==
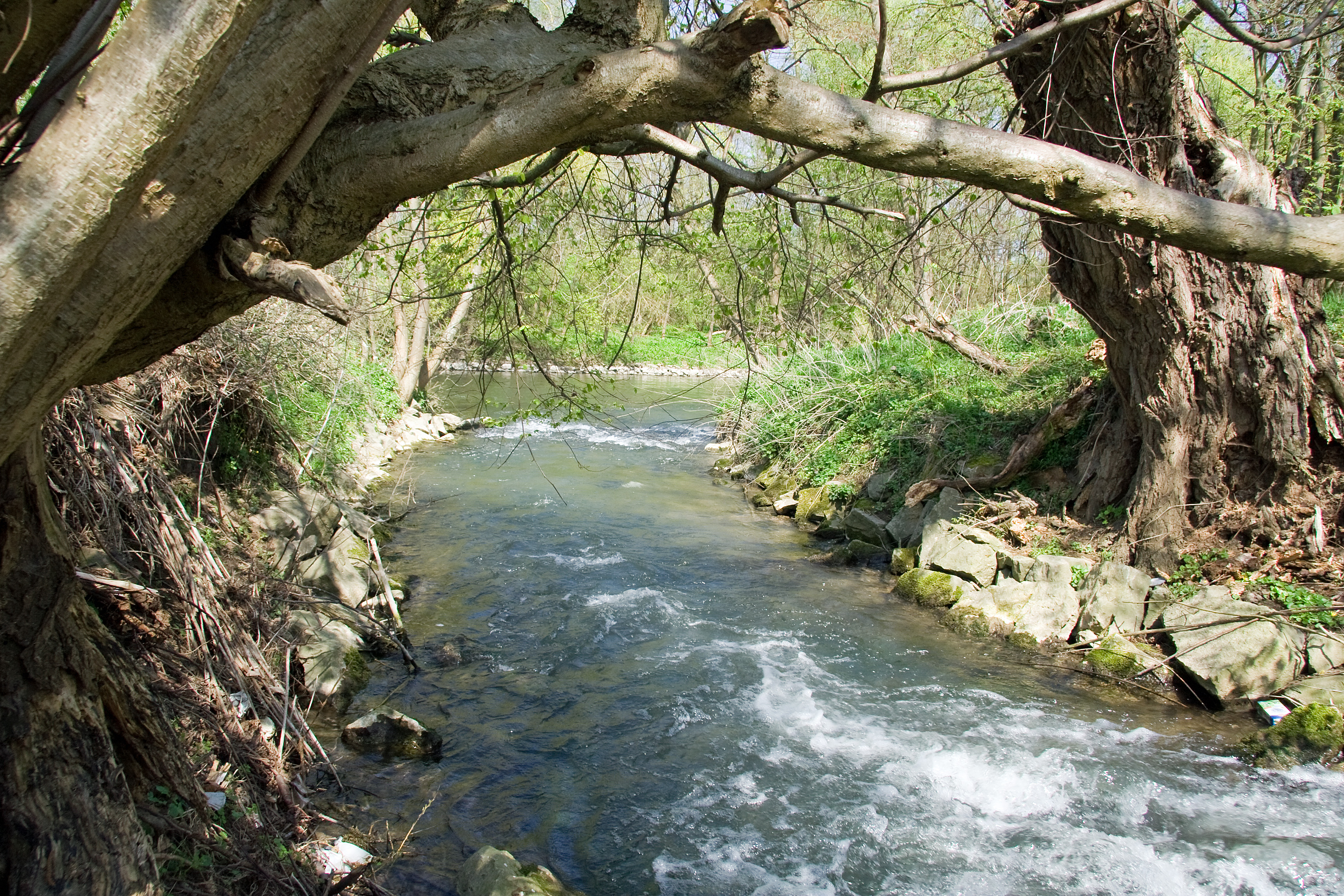
The river near Enzweihingen.

The source of the river is in the grounds of Weissach in Böblingen and flows in a narrow, northeasterly direction. It can reach a depth of 100m into the landscape Strudelbachtal. Between Weissach and Eberdingen, it crosses the border to the district of Ludwigsburg. After 15 km, it flows into the River Enz in Enzweihingen. In its course, it passes through the villages of Strudelbachhalle, Weissach, Eberdingen, Riet and Enzweihingen. It forms a natural border between Strohgäu and Heckengäu.

== History ==
The documented history of Strudelback extends into the 4th Millennium BC and before. It was used as a transport stream and the water was used in mills and as an energy source. At least 10 mills have existed on the river, and at least two companies have continued to use its hydropower. The drainage basin is 55 square miles and in local situations it is relatively narrow and few serious flooding events are known, similar to other rivers in the area. The last flood of the river was on 6 July 2006, measured in Enzweihingen an outflow of 13 m / s (normal level is about 2 m / s), there was little damage to the local villages. The largest flood in the Strudelbach was in February 1940, when intense heat made snow melt rapidly. However, only the creek to the right of the river had any serious damage.

== Agriculture ==
The river flows through an agriculturally and industrially used valley. The side slopes of the river are steep, especially at the junctions of small valleys, which have been used for a long time for wine cultivation. Today, wine is cultivated mainly as a hobby, but some former vineyards are used for recreation. However, many vineyards are now completely overgrown and provide a valuable habitat for plants and animals.

== See also ==
- List of rivers of Baden-Württemberg
