= Erlenbach (Bever) =

River in North Rhine-Westphalia, Germany

Location
- Country: Germany
- State: North Rhine-Westphalia

Physical characteristics
- Mouth
  - location: Bever
  - coordinates: 51.1742°N 7.3826°E

Basin features
- Progression: Bever→ Wupper→ Rhine→ North Sea
- Tributaries
  - left: Kreuzbach

Erlenbach (German: [ˈɛʁlənbax]) is a small river of North Rhine-Westphalia, Germany. It is 4.7 km long and flows into the Bever near Radevormwald.

== See also ==
- List of rivers of North Rhine-Westphalia
