= Enzweihingen =

- Stadtteil of Vaihingen an der Enz
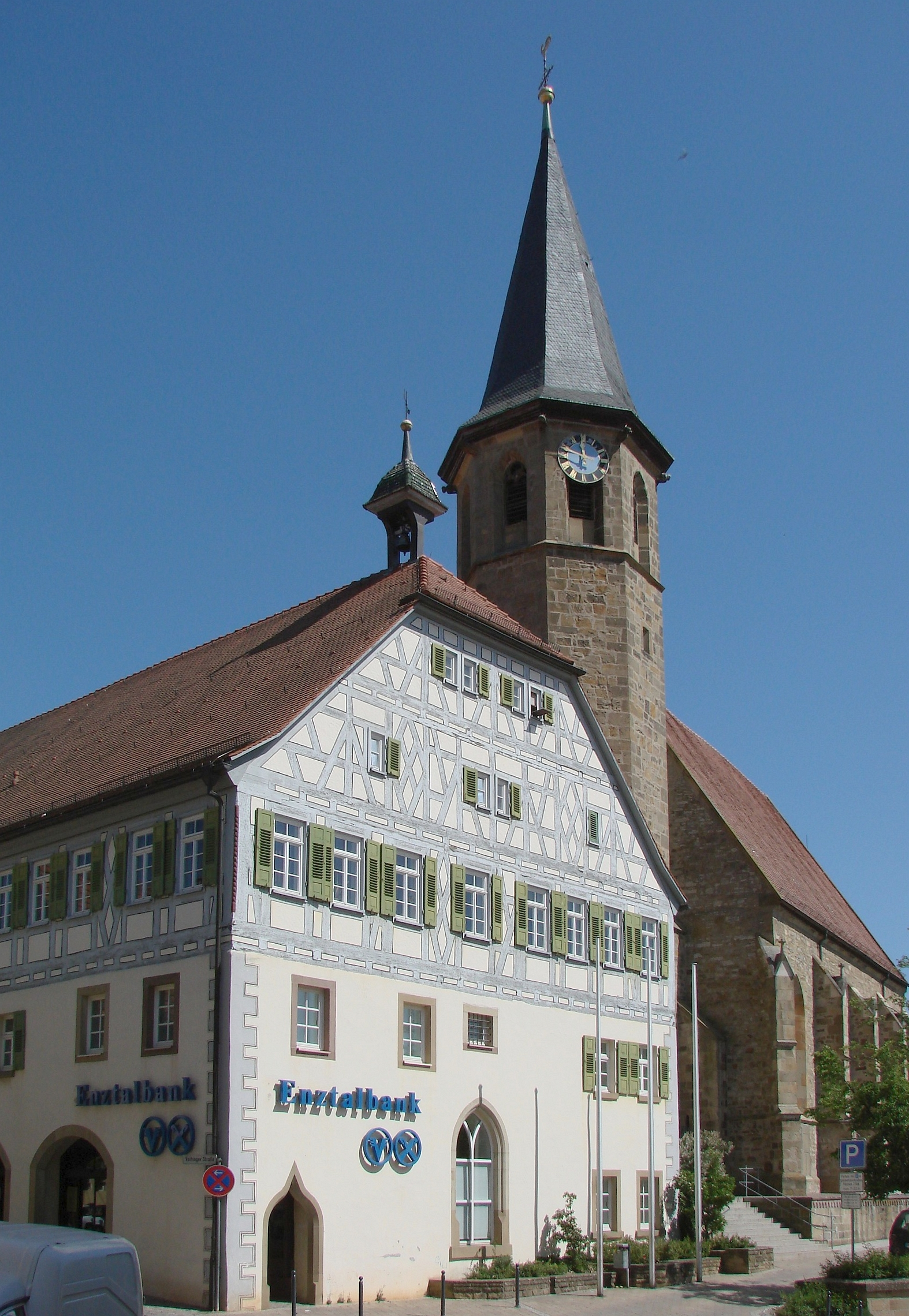

- Coat of arms
- Interactive map of Enzweihingen
- Location within Germany Location within Baden-Württemberg
- Coordinates: 48°55′4″N 8°59′0″E
- Country: Germany
- State: Baden-Württemberg
- Admin. region: Stuttgart
- District: Ludwigsburg
- Town: Vaihingen an der Enz

Population (2021)
  - Total: 3,951
- Time zone: UTC+01:00 (CET)
  - Summer (DST): UTC+02:00 (CEST)
- Vehicle registration: LB

Enzweihingen is a village, part of the town of Vaihingen an der Enz, Germany. It has a population of 3,951 people (2021). Enzweihingen lies about three miles southeast of the centre of Vaihingen, between Strohgäu and Heckengäu, at the confluence of the Kreuzbach, Strudelbach and Enz. It is connected by railway and lies along Bundesstraße 10 Stuttgart–Pforzheim.

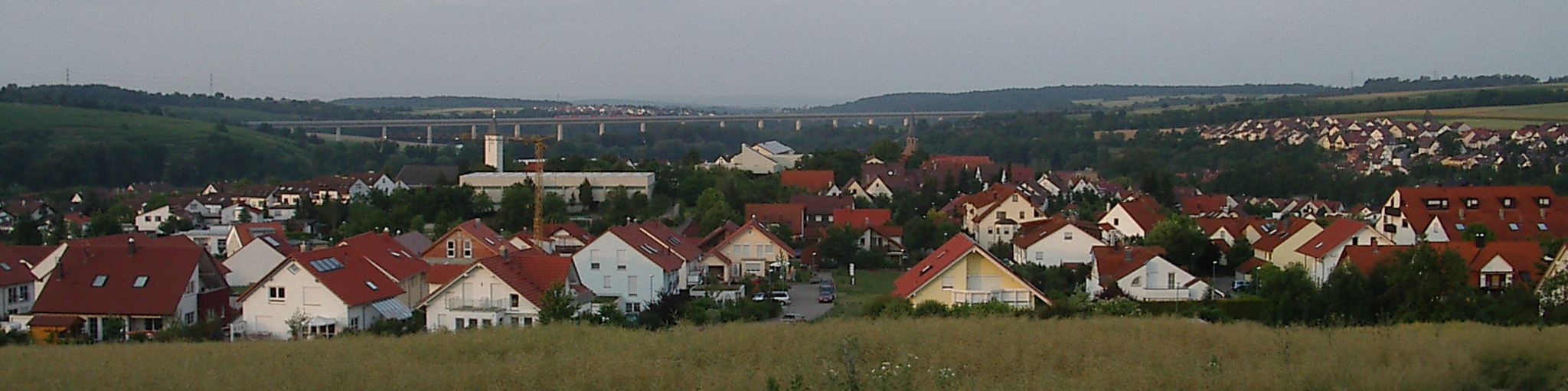
Panorama

== Notable people ==
- Karl Blessing, president of the Bundesbank from 1958 to 1969, born on 5 February 1900 in Enzweihingen.
- Konstantin Freiherr von Neurath, War Criminal, Nazi politician, Foreign Minister nsdap 1932-1938 Reichsprotektor Bohemia and Moravia 1939-1943, Nuremberg process 1946, died on 14 August 1956 in Enzweihingen.
