= Scheuerbach =

River in Germany

Location
- Country: Germany
- States: North Rhine-Westphalia

Physical characteristics
- Source
  - coordinates: 51°11′29″N 7°22′41″E
- Mouth
  - location: Bever
  - coordinates: 51.172°N 7.376°E

Basin features
- Progression: Bever→ Wupper→ Rhine→ North Sea

Scheuerbach is a small river of North Rhine-Westphalia, Germany. It is 2.8 km (1.7 mi) long and flows into the Bever as a right tributary near Radevormwald.

== See also ==
- List of rivers of North Rhine-Westphalia
