= Kreuzbach (Erlenbach) =

River in Germany

Location
- Country: Germany
- States: North Rhine-Westphalia

Physical characteristics
- Mouth
  - location: Erlenbach
  - coordinates: 51.1880°N 7.3892°E

Basin features
- Progression: Erlenbach→ Bever→ Wupper→ Rhine→ North Sea

Kreuzbach is a small river of North Rhine-Westphalia, Germany. It is 2.3 km long and a left tributary of the Erlenbach. It is one of three river and streams in North Rhine-Westphalia named Kreuzbach.

== See also ==
- List of rivers of North Rhine-Westphalia
