= Secret Cabinet Council =

WW2 German governmental body

The Secret Cabinet Council (German: Geheimer Kabinettsrat, also translated "Privy Cabinet Council") in Nazi Germany was a nine-member governmental body created on 4 February 1938. The council was established by decree of Adolf Hitler with the supposed purpose of advising him on foreign policy. It was established ostensibly as a sort of "super cabinet" of close foreign policy advisors. In reality, the council was a paper organization without any real power and never actually met.

== Background ==
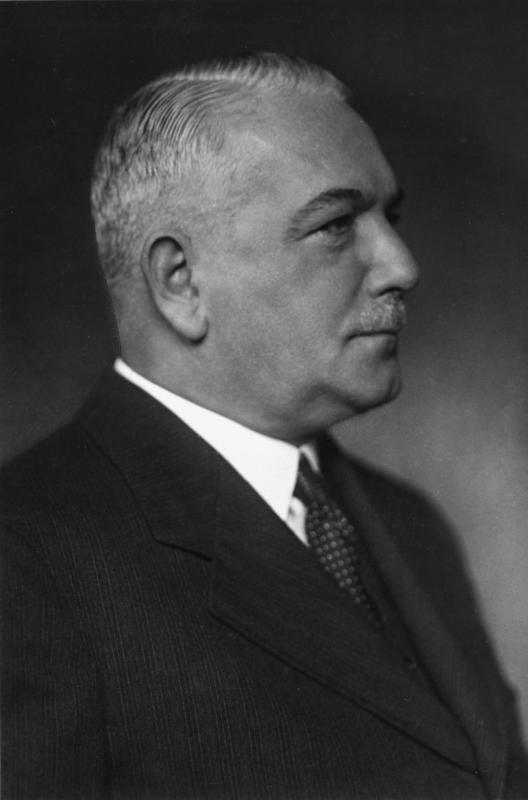
Konstantin von Neurath in 1939

In a 5 November 1937 meeting at the Reich Chancellery with his top foreign policy and military advisors, documented in the Hossbach Memorandum, Hitler unveiled his plans for a more assertive foreign policy, including his aggressive designs against Austria and Czechoslovakia. At this meeting, the Reichsminister for Foreign Affairs, Konstantin von Neurath, expressed his concerns over this new policy. Neurath sought a follow-up audience with Hitler, who rebuffed him and left Berlin for an extended holiday at the Berghof, his mountain retreat in Berchtesgaden. When Neurath finally saw Hitler again on 14 January 1938, he reiterated his opposition to Hitler's plans, indicating that if Hitler persisted with his expansionist plans, he would have to find a new Foreign Minister. In fact, Hitler had already made up his mind to replace Neurath.

On 4 February 1938, as part of a reshuffle of the Reich cabinet and armed forces resulting from the Blomberg-Fritsch Affair, Neurath was sacked and replaced by Joachim von Ribbentrop, an ardent Nazi. Conversely, Neurath was a long-time professional foreign service officer, having served in the German Empire and the Weimar Republic posts since 1901, and had headed the Reich Foreign Ministry since June 1932. To assuage concerns in foreign capitals about the removal of Neurath, a known quantity in international diplomatic circles, Hitler cloaked the departure as a promotion, naming the long-time diplomat as President of the newly created and impressive-sounding Secret Cabinet Council.

== Composition ==
The 4 February 1938 Decree establishing the Council enumerated the following nine members:

Secret Cabinet Council of Nazi Germany
Name	Position(s)
Konstantin von Neurath	President of the Council; Reichsminister without portfolio
Joachim von Ribbentrop	Minister for Foreign Affairs
Hermann Göring	Minister-President of Prussia; Minister for Air; Commander-in-Chief of the Luftwaffe
Rudolf Hess	Deputy Führer; Reichsminister without portfolio
Joseph Goebbels	Reichsminister of Public Enlightenment and Propaganda
Hans Lammers	Chief of the Reich Chancellery; Reichsminister without portfolio
Walther von Brauchitsch	Commander-in-Chief of the Army
Erich Raeder	Commander-in-Chief of the Navy
Wilhelm Keitel	Chief of the Armed Forces High Command

== Existence ==
The council was officially in existence from its inception in February 1938 until the end of the Nazi regime on 8 May 1945. It was established as a select advisory committee of the Reich government for the deliberation of foreign affairs and was granted neither legislative nor administrative functions. The image of an important deliberative body was presented to the world by Nazi propaganda, which depicted the council as a type of "super cabinet." In reality, the council was an empty façade and never even convened. At the Nuremberg Trials on 14 March 1946, Hermann Göring testified about the creation and existence of the council:

In order to avoid a lowering of Herr von Neurath's prestige abroad, I myself was the one to make a proposal to the Führer. I told him that in order to make it appear abroad that von Neurath had not been entirely removed from foreign policy, I would propose to appoint him chairman of the Secret Cabinet Council. There was, to be sure, no such council in existence, but the expression would sound quite nice, and everyone would imagine that it meant something. The Führer said we could not make him chairman if we had no council. Thereupon I said, "Then we shall make one," and offhand I marked down names of several persons .... I declare under oath that this Cabinet Council never met at all, not even for a minute; there was not even an initial meeting for laying down the rules by which it should function. Some members may not even have been informed that they were members.

On 24 June 1946, Neurath himself also testified that the Council "was set up for the sole purpose of masking the reorientation in foreign policy and the changes on the military side" and that it, in fact, never convened.

The above demonstrates, as with so much else in the Third Reich, how Hitler presented the outward appearance of establishing formal governmental institutions and procedures while retaining all actual decision-making authority in his own hands.

== Postwar indictment as a criminal organization ==
The Secret Cabinet Council was indicted as a criminal organization as part of the larger Reich government (Reichsregierung) by the International Military Tribunal in Nuremberg. However, the Tribunal found that no declaration of criminality could be made, as the Council never met and acted as a group or organization.

== Fate of Council members ==
Goebbels had committed suicide on 1 May 1945, and Brauchitsch died in British captivity in October 1948 before being brought to trial. The surviving members of the council were all indicted individually and convicted of war crimes. Göring, Ribbentrop and Keitel were sentenced to death by the International Military Tribunal in October 1946. Göring committed suicide the night before his scheduled execution, but the other two were hanged on 16 October. Hess and Raeder were sentenced to life imprisonment. Raeder was released in 1955 due to ill health and died in 1960; Hess committed suicide in 1987 while still incarcerated at Spandau prison. Neurath was sentenced to 15 years but was released in 1954 due to ill health and died in 1956. Lammers was sentenced to 20 years in the Ministries Trial in 1949, with the term later commuted to 10 years. He was released in 1951 and died in 1962.

== Sources ==
- Shirer, William Lawrence (1960), The Rise and Fall of the Third Reich: A History of Nazi Germany, New York City: Simon & Schuster, ASIN B0766DKDLR, LCCN 60006729, OCLC 1286630, OL 5794925M, Wikidata Q138029595
- Snyder, Louis L. (1976). Encyclopedia of the Third Reich. McGraw Hill Inc. ISBN 978-1569249178.
- Wistrich, Robert (1982). Who's Who in Nazi Germany. Macmillan Publishing Co. ISBN 0-02-630600-X.
- Faber, David (2009). Munich, 1938: Appeasement and World War II. Simon and Schuster. ISBN 978-1439149928.
