= Konstantin von Neurath =

German diplomat and war criminal (1873–1956)

Konstantin Freiherr von Neurath
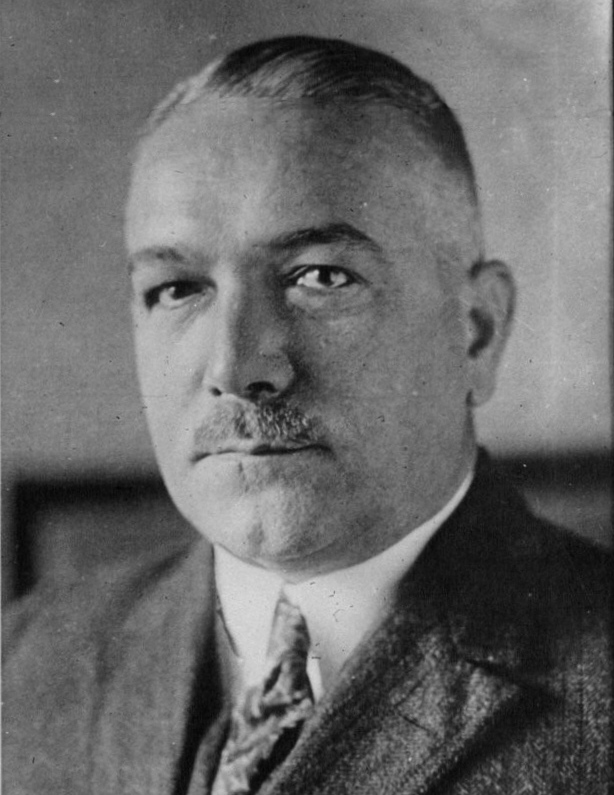
- Neurath in 1933

Protector of Bohemia and Moravia
- In office 21 March 1939 – 24 August 1943
- Appointed by: Adolf Hitler
- Preceded by: Office established
- Succeeded by: Wilhelm Frick

Reich Minister of Foreign Affairs
- In office 1 June 1932 – 4 February 1938
- President: Paul von Hindenburg; Adolf Hitler (as Führer)
- Chancellor: Franz von Papen; Kurt von Schleicher; Adolf Hitler
- Preceded by: Heinrich Brüning
- Succeeded by: Joachim von Ribbentrop

Personal details
- Born: Konstantin Hermann Karl Freiherr von Neurath; 2 February 1873 Kleinglattbach, German Empire
- Died: 14 August 1956 (aged 83) Enzweihingen, West Germany
- Party: Nazi Party (1937–1945)
- Spouse: Marie Auguste Moser von Filseck (m. 1901)
- Relations: Wendelgard von Staden (niece)
- Children: 2
- Education: Friedrich Wilhelm University; University of Tübingen
- Occupation: Diplomat
- Profession: Lawyer
- Cabinet: Hitler cabinet

Military service
- Allegiance: German Empire
- Branch/service: Imperial German Army
- Years of service: 1914–1916
- Unit: Grenadier Regiment "Queen Olga" (26th Division)
- Battles/wars: World War I
- Awards: Iron Cross, 1st class Wound Badge
- Criminal information
- Status: Deceased
- Convictions: Conspiracy to commit crimes against peace Crimes of aggression War crimes Crimes against humanity
- Trial: Nuremberg trials
- Penalty: 15 years imprisonment

Konstantin Hermann Karl Freiherr von Neurath (2 February 1873 – 14 August 1956) was a German politician, diplomat and convicted Nazi war criminal who served as Foreign Minister of Germany between 1932 and 1938.

Born to a Swabian noble family, Neurath began his diplomatic career in 1901. He fought in World War I and was awarded the Iron Cross for his service. After the war, Neurath served as minister to Denmark, ambassador to Italy and ambassador to Britain. In 1932, he was appointed Foreign Minister by Chancellor Franz von Papen, and he continued to hold the post under Adolf Hitler.

In the early years of the Nazi regime, Neurath was regarded as playing a key role in Hitler's foreign policy pursuits in undermining the Treaty of Versailles and in territorial expansion in the prelude to World War II. However, he was often averse to Hitler's aims for tactical, not necessarily ideological, reasons. That aversion eventually induced Hitler to replace Neurath in 1938 with the more compliant Joachim von Ribbentrop, a fervent Nazi. Neurath served as Reich Protector of Bohemia and Moravia between 1939 and 1943, but his authority was only nominal after September 1941.

Neurath was tried as a war criminal at the Nuremberg trials and was sentenced to 15 years in prison for his compliance and actions in Nazi Germany. He received an early release in 1954 and then retired to his family estate, where he died two years later.

== Early life ==
Neurath was born at the manor of Kleinglattbach (since 1972 part of Vaihingen an der Enz) in Württemberg, the scion of a Swabian Freiherren noble family and political dynasty of the Kingdom of Württemberg. His grandfather, Constantin Franz von Neurath, had served as Foreign Minister under King Charles I of Württemberg (reigned 1864–1891), and his father, Konstantin Sebastian von Neurath (died 1912), had been a Free Conservative member of the German Reichstag and Chamberlain of King William II of Württemberg.

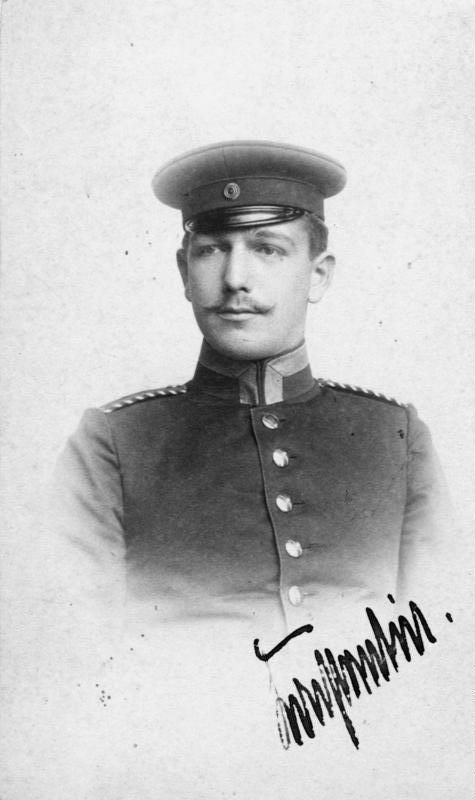
Konstantin Freiherr von Neurath during his military service, 1893

Neurath studied law in Tübingen and in Berlin. After graduating in 1897, he initially joined a local law firm in his home town. In 1901, he entered into civil service and worked for the Foreign Office in Berlin. In 1903, he was assigned to the German embassy in London, at first as Vice-Consul and from 1909 as Legationsrat (legation counsel). After the visit of the Prince of Wales to the Kingdom of Württemberg in 1904, as Lord Chamberlain to King William II, Neurath was created an Honorary Knight Grand Cross of the Royal Victorian Order. Neurath's career was decisively advanced by Secretary of State Alfred von Kiderlen-Waechter. In 1914, he was sent to the embassy in Constantinople.

During World War I, he served as an officer with an infantry regiment until 1916, when he was badly wounded. In December 1914, he was awarded the Iron Cross. He returned to the German diplomatic service in the Ottoman Empire (1914–1916), where he wrote a memorandum on the German embassy's official position regarding the Armenian genocide to German consulates in the Ottoman Empire. The memorandum justified the actions of the Ottoman government during the Armenian Genocide while also attempting to present the German government as protesting against the "excesses" of the genocide. In 1917, he temporarily quit the diplomatic service to succeed his uncle Julius von Soden as head of the royal Württemberg government.

On 30 May 1901, Neurath married Marie Auguste Moser von Filseck (1875–1960) in Stuttgart. His son, Konstantin, was born in 1902, followed by his daughter, Winifred, in 1904.

== Political career ==
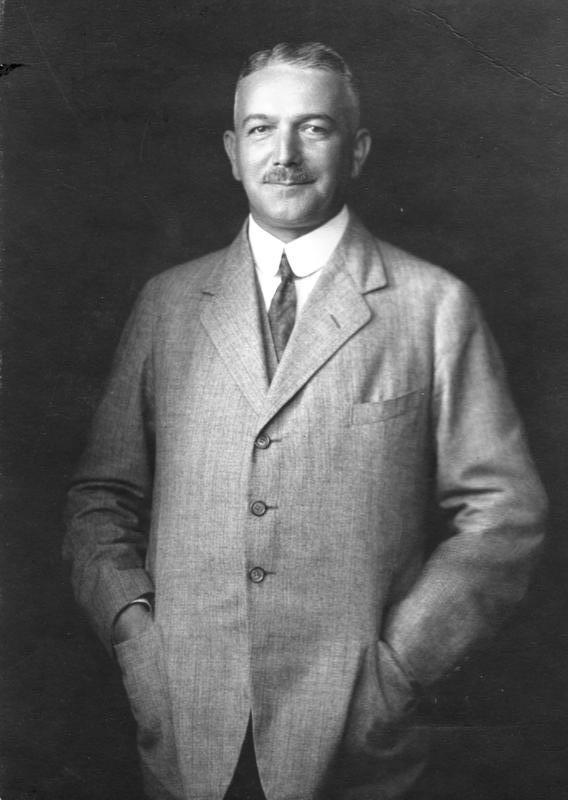
Neurath in 1920

In 1919, Neurath, with the approval by President Friedrich Ebert, returned to diplomacy and joined the embassy in Copenhagen as Minister to Denmark. From 1921 to 1930, he was the ambassador to Rome and was not overly impressed with Italian fascism. After the death of Chancellor Gustav Stresemann in 1929, Neurath was already considered for the post of Foreign Minister in the cabinet of Chancellor Hermann Müller by President Paul von Hindenburg, but his appointment failed because of the objections raised by the governing parties. In 1930, Neurath returned to head the embassy in London.

Neurath was recalled to Germany in 1932 and became Reichsminister of Foreign Affairs as an independent politician in the "Cabinet of Barons" under Chancellor Franz von Papen in June. He continued to hold that position under Chancellor Kurt von Schleicher in December and then under Adolf Hitler from the Machtergreifung on 30 January 1933. During the early days of Hitler's rule, Neurath lent an aura of respectability to Hitler's expansionist foreign policy.

In May 1933, the American chargé d'affaires reported, "Baron von Neurath has shown such a remarkable capacity for submitting to what in normal times could only be considered as affronts and indignities on the part of the Nazis, that it is still quite a possibility that the latter should be content to have him remain as a figurehead for some time yet". He was involved in the German withdrawal from the League of Nations in 1933, the negotiations of the Anglo-German Naval Agreement (1935) and the remilitarisation of the Rhineland. Neurath was also made a member of Hans Frank's Academy for German Law. To mark the fourth anniversary of the regime on 30 January 1937, Hitler determined to enroll all the remaining non-Nazi ministers in the Nazi Party and to confer upon them personally the Golden Party Badge. By his acceptance, Neurath officially joined the Nazi Party (membership number 3,805,229). Additionally, in September 1937, he was given the honorary rank of a Gruppenführer in the SS, equivalent in the Wehrmacht rank to a Generalleutnant.

On 5 November 1937, the conference was held between the Reich's top military-foreign policy leadership and Hitler, which was recorded in the so-called Hossbach Memorandum. At the conference, Hitler stated that it was the time for war or, more accurately, wars, as what Hitler envisioned were a series of localised wars in Central and Eastern Europe in the near future. Hitler argued that because the wars were necessary to provide Germany with Lebensraum, autarky and the arms race with France and Britain made it imperative to act before the Western powers developed an insurmountable lead in the arms race. He further declared that Germany must be ready for war as early as 1938 and at the latest by 1943.

Of those invited to the conference, objections arose from Neurath, War Minister Generalfeldmarschall Werner von Blomberg and Army Commander-in-Chief, Generaloberst Werner von Fritsch. They all believed that any German aggression in Eastern Europe was bound to trigger a war with France because of the French alliance system in Eastern Europe, the so-called cordon sanitaire. They further believed that if a Franco-German war broke out, it would quickly escalate to a European war since Britain would almost certainly intervene, rather than risk the prospect of France's defeat. Moreover, they contended that Hitler's assumption was flawed that Britain and France would ignore the projected wars because they had started their rearmament later than Germany. The opposition expressed by Fritsch, Blomberg and Neurath was concerned entirely with the assessment that Germany could not start a war in the heart of Europe without Anglo-French involvement, and more time was needed to rearm. However, they did not express any moral opposition to aggression or disagreement with Hitler's basic idea of annexing Austria or Czechoslovakia. That said, offering moral or humanitarian arguments to Hitler — just three years after the Night of the Long Knives — would have been futile if not dangerous.

In response to the reservations expressed at the conference, Hitler tightened his control of the military-foreign policy making apparatus by removing those who expressed reservations at the November conference: Blomberg, Fritsch and Neurath. On 4 February 1938, Neurath was sacked as Foreign Minister with Blomberg and Fritsch also losing their posts (the Blomberg–Fritsch Affair). Neurath was succeeded by Joachim von Ribbentrop but remained in government as a minister without portfolio to allay the concerns that his removal would have caused internationally. Neurath was also named as president of the Secret Cabinet Council, a purported super-cabinet to advise Hitler on foreign affairs. On paper, it appeared that Neurath had been promoted. However, this body only existed on paper; Hermann Göring subsequently testified that it never met, "not for a minute".

In March 1939, Neurath was appointed Reichsprotektor of occupied Bohemia and Moravia, serving as Hitler's personal representative in the protectorate. Hitler chose Neurath in part to pacify the international outrage over the German occupation of Czechoslovakia. Soon after his arrival at Prague Castle, Neurath instituted harsh press censorship and banned political parties and trade unions. He ordered a harsh crackdown on protesting students in October and November 1939 (1,200 student protesters went to concentration camps and nine were executed). He also supervised the persecution of Czech Jews according to the Nuremberg Laws. Draconian as those measures were, Neurath's rule overall was fairly mild by Nazi standards. Notably, he tried to restrain the excesses of his police chief, Karl Hermann Frank.

However, in September 1941, Hitler decided that Neurath's rule was too lenient and so stripped him of his day-to-day powers. Reinhard Heydrich was named as his deputy but in truth held the real power. Heydrich was assassinated in 1942 and succeeded by Kurt Daluege. Neurath officially remained as Reichsprotektor. He tried to resign in 1941, but his resignation was not accepted until August 1943, when he was succeeded by the former Interior Minister Wilhelm Frick. On 21 June 1943, Neurath had been raised to the honorary rank of an SS-Obergruppenführer, the equivalent to a three-star general.

Late in the war, Neurath had contacts with the German resistance.

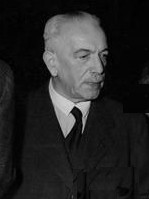
Neurath as defendant in Nuremberg, 1946

== Trial and imprisonment ==
The Allies prosecuted Neurath at the Nuremberg trials in 1946. Otto von Lüdinghausen appeared for his defence. The prosecution accused him of "conspiracy to commit crimes against peace; planning, initiating and waging wars of aggression; war crimes and crimes against humanity". Neurath's defence strategy was predicated on the fact that his successor and fellow defendant, Ribbentrop, was more culpable for the atrocities committed in the Nazi state than Neurath was.

The International Military Tribunal acknowledged that most of Neurath's crimes against humanity were conducted during his short tenure as nominal Protector of Bohemia and Moravia, especially in quelling the Czech resistance, and in the summary execution of several university students. The tribunal came to the consensus that Neurath had been a willing and active participant in war crimes but held no such prominent position during the height of the Third Reich's tyranny and so had been only a minor adherent to the atrocities committed. He was found guilty by the Allies on all four counts and was sentenced to 15 years' imprisonment.

Neurath was held as a war criminal in Spandau Prison until 6 November 1954, when he was released in the wake of the Paris Conference, officially because of his ill health, as he had suffered a heart attack.

== Later life ==
He retired to his family's estates in Enzweihingen, where he died two years later on 14 August 1956, aged 83. He was the uncle of writer and diplomat Wendelgard von Staden.

== See also ==
- List of rulers of the Protectorate Bohemia and Moravia
- List SS-Obergruppenführer
- Witnesses and testimonies of the Armenian genocide

== Sources ==
- Craig, Gordon "The German Foreign Office from Neurath to Ribbentrop" pp. 406–436 from The Diplomats 1919–39 edited by Gordon A. Craig and Felix Gilbert, Princeton: Princeton University Press, 1953.
- Heineman, John Louis Hitler's First Foreign Minister: Konstantin Freiherr von Neurath, Diplomat and Statesman, Berkeley: University of California Press, 1979 ISBN 0-520-03442-2.
- Ihrig, Stefan Justifying Genocide: Germany and the Armenians from Bismarck to Hitler, Harvard: Harvard University Press, 2016 ISBN 978-0-674-50479-0.
- Nekrich, Aleksandr Moiseevich. Pariahs, Partners, Predators: German-Soviet Relations, 1922–1941 (Columbia University Press, 1997).

Political offices
Preceded by Heinrich Brüning	Foreign Minister of Germany; 1932–1938	Succeeded by Joachim von Ribbentrop
Government offices
Preceded by Johannes Blaskowitz (as Wehrmacht commander-in-chief)	Protector of Bohemia and Moravia; 1939–1941 (factually) or 1943 (nominally)	Succeeded by Reinhard Heydrich
Preceded by Johannes Blaskowitz (as Wehrmacht commander-in-chief)	Protector of Bohemia and Moravia; 1939–1941 (factually) or 1943 (nominally)	Succeeded by Wilhelm Frick
Diplomatic posts
Preceded by Friedrich Sthamer	German Ambassador to the Court of St. James; 1930–1932	Succeeded by Leopold von Hoesch
