= Jacob Friedrich von Abel =

German philosopher (1751–1829)

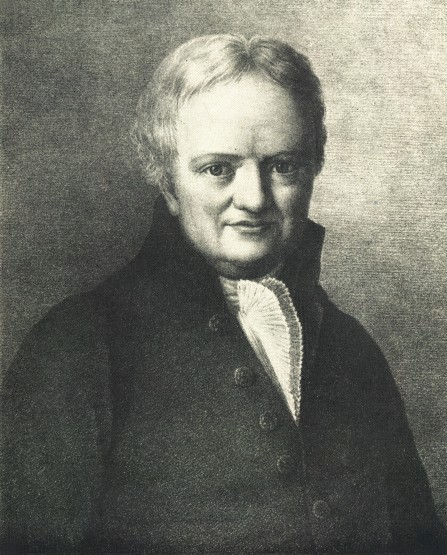
Jacob Friedrich von Abel

Jacob Friedrich von Abel (9 May 1751 – 7 July 1829) was a German philosopher. His main interest was the human soul and in trying to find a proof for its immortality.

Born in Vaihingen an der Enz, von Abel studied philology, philosophy and theology in the lower seminaries in Denkendorf and Maulbronn and in the higher seminary in Tübingen. He graduated in 1770 and was appointed professor of philosophy at the Militär-Pflanzschule at the Solitude Palace which moved later to Stuttgart. While there, he was one of Schiller's teachers and a good friend (becoming the dedicatee of his second play, Fiesco).

In 1790 he was appointed professor of philosophy and headmaster of the Contubernium in Tübingen; in 1792 he was a pedagogue of the Latin Schulen ob der Staig. Notably during this period, he adopted renowned German idealist Georg Wilhelm Friedrich Hegel as his protege, according to Hegel's sister. It is also known that Abel's short book in defence of traditional rational metaphysics against Kant's arguments, was one of the first pieces of literature on Kantianism to which Hegel was exposed. In 1811 Abel became prelate, general superintendent in Oehringen and member of the executive authority of the Evangelic Church in Württemberg. In 1823 von Abel became general superintendent in Bad Urach and Reutlingen, and lived in Stuttgart. He died on a leisure excursion in Schorndorf.

Jacob Friedrich von Abel was also a member of the Illuminatenorden, known as Pythagoras Abderites.

== Publications ==
- Einleitung in die Seelenlehre (1786)
- Ausführliche Darstellung des Grundes unserez Glaubens an Unsterblichkeit (1826)
- Sammlung und Erklärung merkwürdiger Erscheinungen aus dem menschlichen Leben (1784–1790, 3 volumes)

The latter contains in its second volume a story on which Schiller's Verbrecher aus Infamie, eine wahre Geschichte is based.

== Sources ==
- Allgemeine Deutsche Biographie — online version
