= Berndt von Staden =

German diplomat (1919–2014)

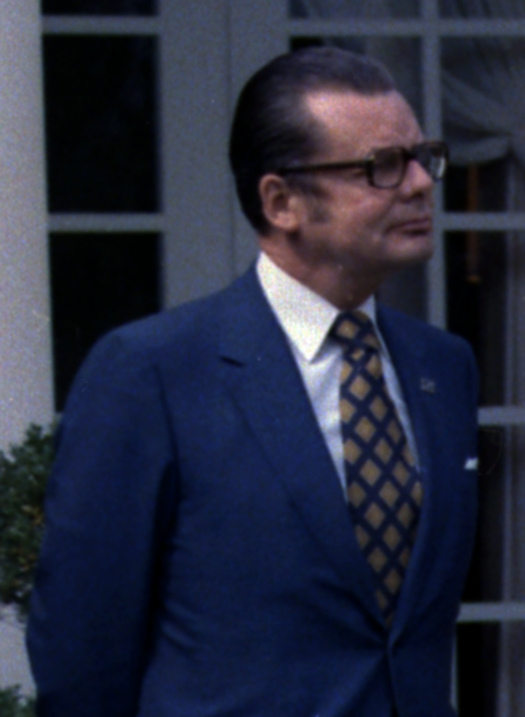

West German Ambassador to the United States
- In office February 1973 – November 1979
- President: Gustav Heinemann; Walter Scheel; Karl Carstens
- Preceded by: Rolf Friedemann Pauls
- Succeeded by: Peter Hermes

Personal details
- Born: 24 June 1919 Rostock, Germany
- Died: 17 October 2014 (aged 95) Ludwigsburg, Germany
- Spouse: Wendelgard von Neurath (m. 1961)

Berndt Robert Alexander Michael von Staden (24 June 1919 – 17 October 2014) was a German diplomat who was the West German Ambassador to the United States from 1973 until 1979.

== Life ==
Von Staden grew up as a Baltic German in Tallinn, Estonia. He studied law in Bonn and Hamburg. In 1951, he joined the Foreign Office.

He was head of the Consular Section of the West German Embassy in Brussels, from 1953 to 1955. In 1958, he was posted to the Commission of the European Economic Community. In 1961, he married Wendelgard, Freiin von Neurath (1925–2026). In 1963, he was Counsellor at the West German Embassy in Washington. Then he was Head of Political Department of the Foreign Office in Bonn.

In his memoir, he describes the beginning of the turn from confrontation to détente, which he observed as ambassador of the Federal Republic of Germany, during the Kennedy and Johnson administrations in Washington, D.C. In the governments of Willy Brandt and Helmut Schmidt, he was the Head of Foreign Relations and Security in the Federal Chancellery in the shaping the policy of détente.

In 1970, he met with Étienne Davignon. Von Staden was given the 1979 Trainor Award.

== Works ==
- Zwischen Eiszeit und Tauwetter, Diplomatie in einer Epoche des Umbruchs. Erinnerungen, wjs, Berlin 2005, ISBN 978-3-937989-05-1
- Erinnerungen aus der Vorzeit: Eine Jugend im Baltikum 1919–1939, Siedler, Berlin 1999, ISBN 3-88680-670-7
- Ende und Anfang, Erinnerungen 1939–1963, iPa, Vaihingen/Enz 2001, ISBN 3-933486-28-9
