= Bever (Wupper) =

River in Germany

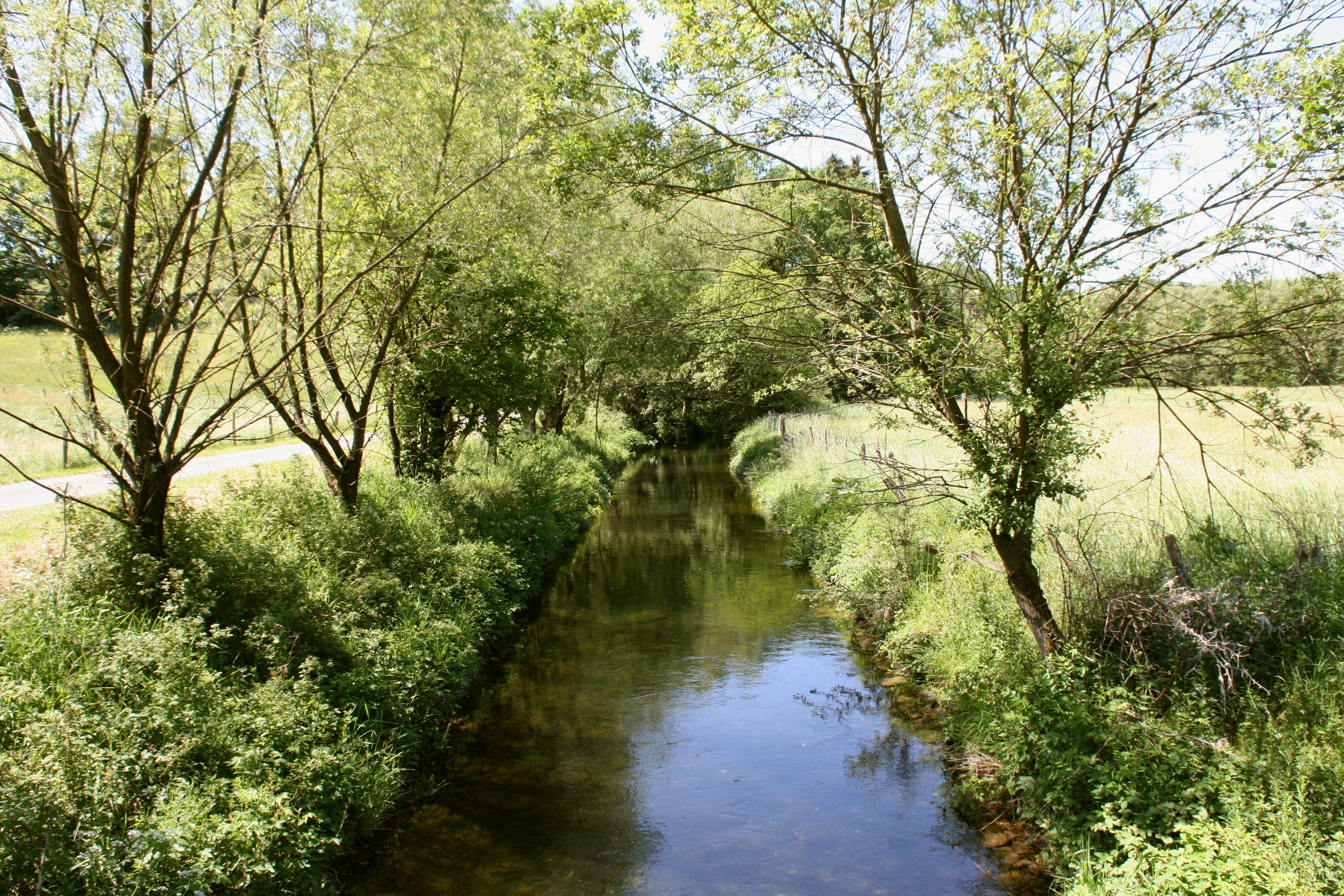

Location
- Country: Germany
- State: North Rhine-Westphalia

Physical characteristics
- Source
  - location: district In den Eicken of Halver
  - coordinates: 51.1848°N 7.4353°E
- Mouth
  - location: district Hartkopsbever of Hückeswagen, into the Wupper
  - coordinates: 51.1410°N 7.3529°E
- Length: 10.0 km (6.2 mi)

Basin features
- Progression: Wupper→ Rhine→ North Sea
- Tributaries
  - right: Moorbach, Erlenbach, Scheuerbach

Bever (German pronunciation: [ˈbeːvɐ]) is a river of North Rhine-Westphalia, Germany.

After being dammed by the Bevertalsperre into the Beverteich, it flows into the Wupper in Hückeswagen.

== See also ==
- List of rivers of North Rhine-Westphalia
