= Karl Blessing =

German banker

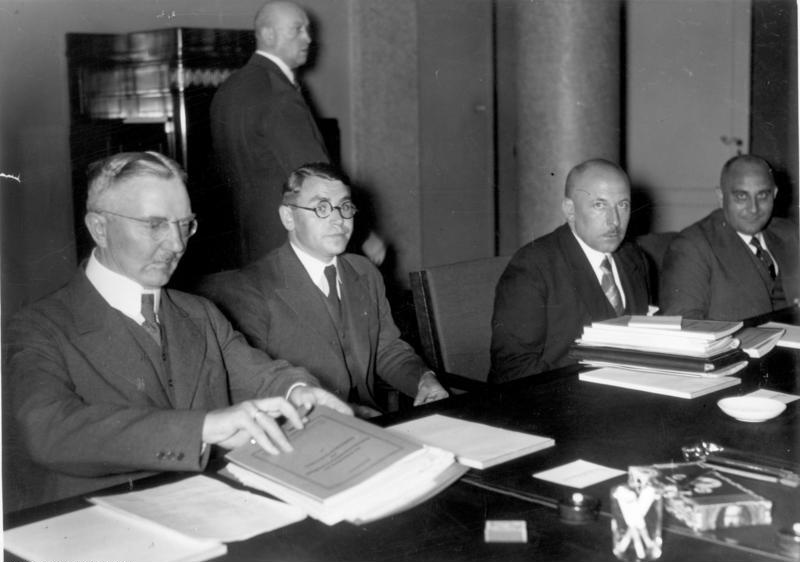
- The German representative in the Transfer Commission, 1934, from left: Hjalmar Schacht, Blessing, Emil Puhl, von Wedel

President of the Deutsche Bundesbank
- In office 1958–1969

Personal details
- Born: 5 February 1900 Enzweihingen, German Empire
- Died: 25 April 1971 (aged 71) Rasteau, Provence-Alpes-Côte d'Azur, France
- Education: Handelshochschule Berlin

Karl Blessing (5 February 1900 – 25 April 1971) was a German banker. He was president of the Deutsche Bundesbank from 1958 to 1969.

== Early life ==
He was born in Württemberg, joined the Reichsbank in 1920 and graduated in business administration in 1925.

== Pre World War Two ==
In 1929 he became an assistant to then Reichsbank president Hjalmar Schacht and in 1934 he was seconded to the Reich Ministry of Economics. He became a member of the executive board of the Reichsbank in 1937 but was dismissed in February 1939 along with other board members for criticizing Nazi economic policy.

He joined the Nazi Party and after the 1938 Anschluss he was given the job of absorbing the Austrian National Bank. Blessing moved in the highest circles of the Third Reich.

== World War Two Era ==
Recent historical evidence undercuts Mr. Blessing's statements that he was unaware of Nazi treatment of Jews: in 1941, he wrote a letter asking to take possession of an apartment which the Gestapo had recently taken from a Jewish family.

As the American historian Christopher Simpson notes in his book The Splendid Blond Beast, a ground-breaking study of the links between big business and genocide, Blessing attended 30 out of 38 meetings of the Himmlerkreis, the secret group of financiers and industrialists who bankrolled the private projects of Heinrich Himmler. He went on two group trips to visit concentration camps, guided by Himmler himself.

During the war, Blessing joined the board of Kontinentale Öl, a monopoly created by IG Farben and private oil companies to seize control of petroleum firms in the newly conquered territories, and served as a member of its senior management team. His fellow board members included Walther Funk, the Reichsbank president and Bank for International Settlements (BIS) director, and Heinrich Butefisch, a senior executive at IG Farben. Like IG Farben, Kontinentale-Öl was built on slavery, plunder and murder. It ran a network of concentration camps in Poland where the workers were “leased” from the SS until they died of starvation or overwork.

Blessing was a classic example of the intelligent, amoral Nazi technocrat that smoothly transitioned to the new West Germany. At best he was complicit in genocide, at worst he was what Simon Wiesenthal called a “desk-murderer”, a loyal follower always eager to do his duty, no matter what the cost in human lives. Blessing's name was found in documents by Carl Goerdeler naming him as a potential minister of economics or president of the Reichsbank if the 20 July plot to kill Adolf Hitler had succeeded. He was not arrested by the Gestapo after the plot failed.

== Post-war ==
After the war, Blessing was arrested while the Allied authorities considered charging him with war crimes. However, Allen Dulles also had Blessing in his sights. In the summer of 1945, U.S. occupation authorities asked Dulles to provide whitelists of suitable candidates for posts in the new German administration. Dulles provided an A list and a B list. The A list included Ernst Hulse, the former head of the BIS banking department. Blessing's was the first name on the B list. Dulles termed him "a prominent businessman and financial expert with considerable experience in international trade", which was one way of describing him. John J. McCloy also wrote a letter of support for Blessing.

With Dulles's support, Blessing was freed to return to his former employers Unilever. In 1958, Blessing was appointed president of the Deutsche Bundesbank, successor to the Reichsbank. Blessing served as president until 1969, regularly attending the central bankers’ meetings at the BIS. After 1945 Blessing reinvented his wartime past as a “lowly functionary” in a government ministry, a myth swallowed by a credulous press.

Shortly after retiring as president of the Deutsche Bundesbank in 1969, Blessing died in Rasteau, France, aged 71, garlanded with praise from his fellow bankers and the German establishment, his wartime role at Kontinentale-Öl forgotten or glossed over. His grandson, Martin Blessing, was CEO of Commerzbank from 2008 to 2016.
