= Moorbach (Bever) =

River in Germany

Location
- Country: Germany
- State: North Rhine-Westphalia

Physical characteristics
- Mouth
  - location: Bever
  - coordinates: 51.1727°N 7.3956°E
- Length: 3.3 km (2.1 mi)

Basin features
- Progression: Bever→ Wupper→ Rhine→ North Sea

Moorbach is a small river of North Rhine-Westphalia, Germany. It is a right tributary of the Bever.

== See also ==
- List of rivers of North Rhine-Westphalia
