= Kreuzbach (Strudelbach) =

River in Germany

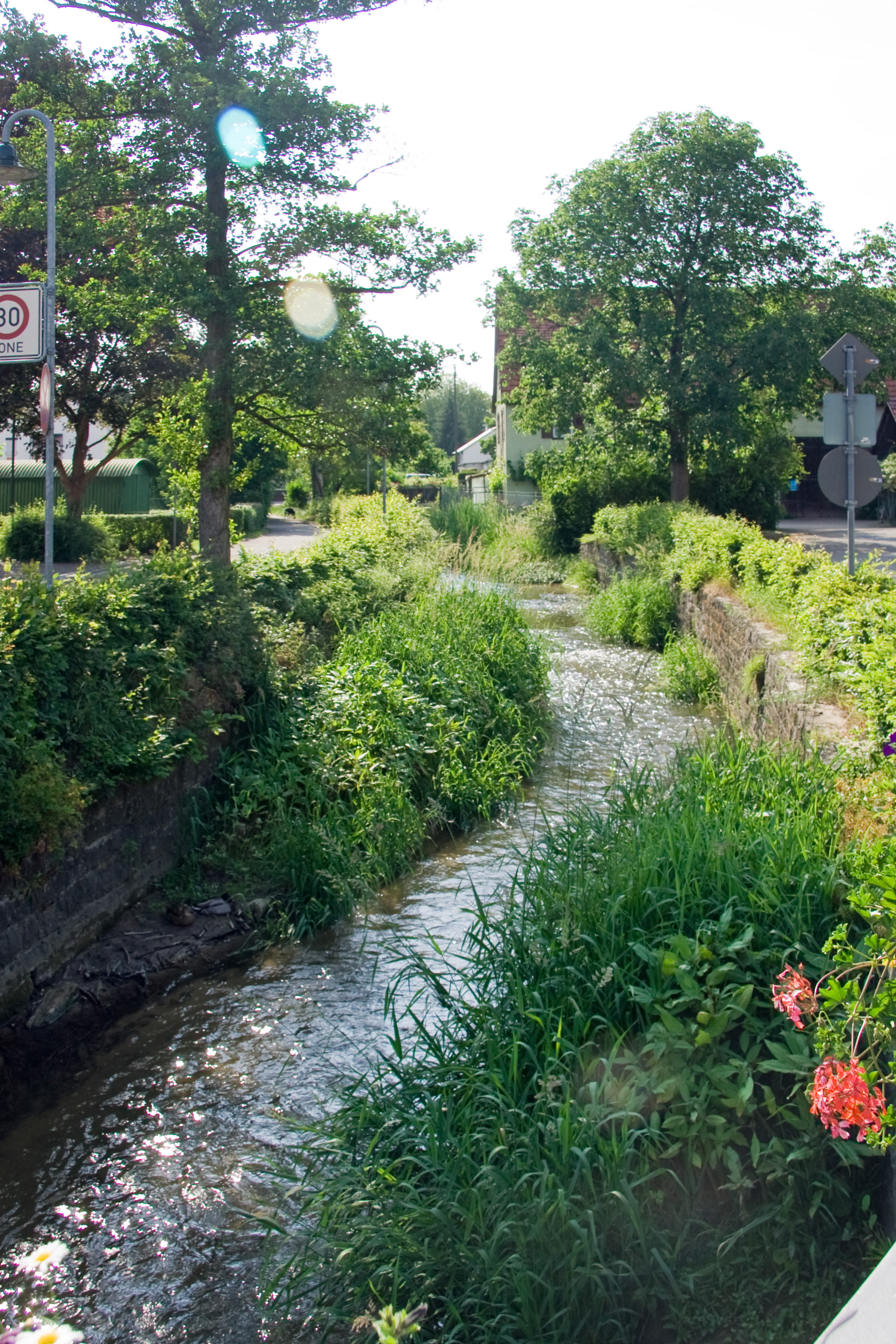

Location
- Country: Germany
- State: Baden-Württemberg

Physical characteristics
- Mouth
  - location: Strudelbach
  - coordinates: 48.9126°N 8.9797°E
- Length: 21.3 km (13.2 mi)

Basin features
- Progression: Strudelbach→ Enz→ Neckar→ Rhine→ North Sea

Kreuzbach is a river of Baden-Württemberg, Germany. It is a left tributary of the Strudelbach in Enzweihingen.

== See also ==
- List of rivers of Baden-Württemberg
