= Wendelgard von Staden =

German writer and diplomat (1925–2026)

Wendelgard von Staden (née von Neurath; 7 June 1925 – 21 May 2026) was a German diplomat and author. In 1979, she published a memoir Darkness Over the Valley: Growing Up in Nazi Germany where she shares memories from her youth during the Nazi era about a concentration camp on her family’s estate and how her mother tried to help the people imprisoned there.

== Life and career ==
Von Staden was born on 7 June 1925 to Baroness Irmgard and Baron Ernst von Neurath. Her uncle was Konstantin von Neurath, who was Adolf Hitler's first foreign minister. She grew up in Kleinglattbach, and attended school in Vaihingen an der Enz, the grammar school in Ludwigsburg. She received her high school diploma in Berlin in 1943 and completed an agricultural apprenticeship on a farm near Heilbronn.

She earned a degree in economics from the University of Tübingen. In 1948, she studied in Paris at the Institut d'Etudes Politiques as part of the first German-French student exchange after World War II. In 1950, she was an exchange student at UCLA, studying political science. During this time she and friends from UCLA spent two months traveling the United States.

Von Staden pursued a diplomatic career, working in the German foreign service for ten years. She served as the first secretary of the West German Embassy in Washington, DC. In 1961, she married German diplomat Berndt von Staden, and she was forced by regulations to give up her own career. She met her husband in Washington at an embassy dinner party. In 1963, he was posted to Washington, and they moved to Bonn in 1968, returning to Washington from 1973 to 1979 where her husband served as the West German ambassador to the United States. They had three children.

She is the subject of the 2024 documentary film It Happened On Our Ground, which won the award for best Israeli documentary at the Tel Aviv International Documentary Film Festival.

Darkness Over the Valley: Growing Up in Nazi Germany is the autobiographical account of Wendelgard von Staden's youth originally published in German in 1979.

Von Staden died on 21 May 2026, at the age of 100.
