= Vaihingen an der Enz =

- Town
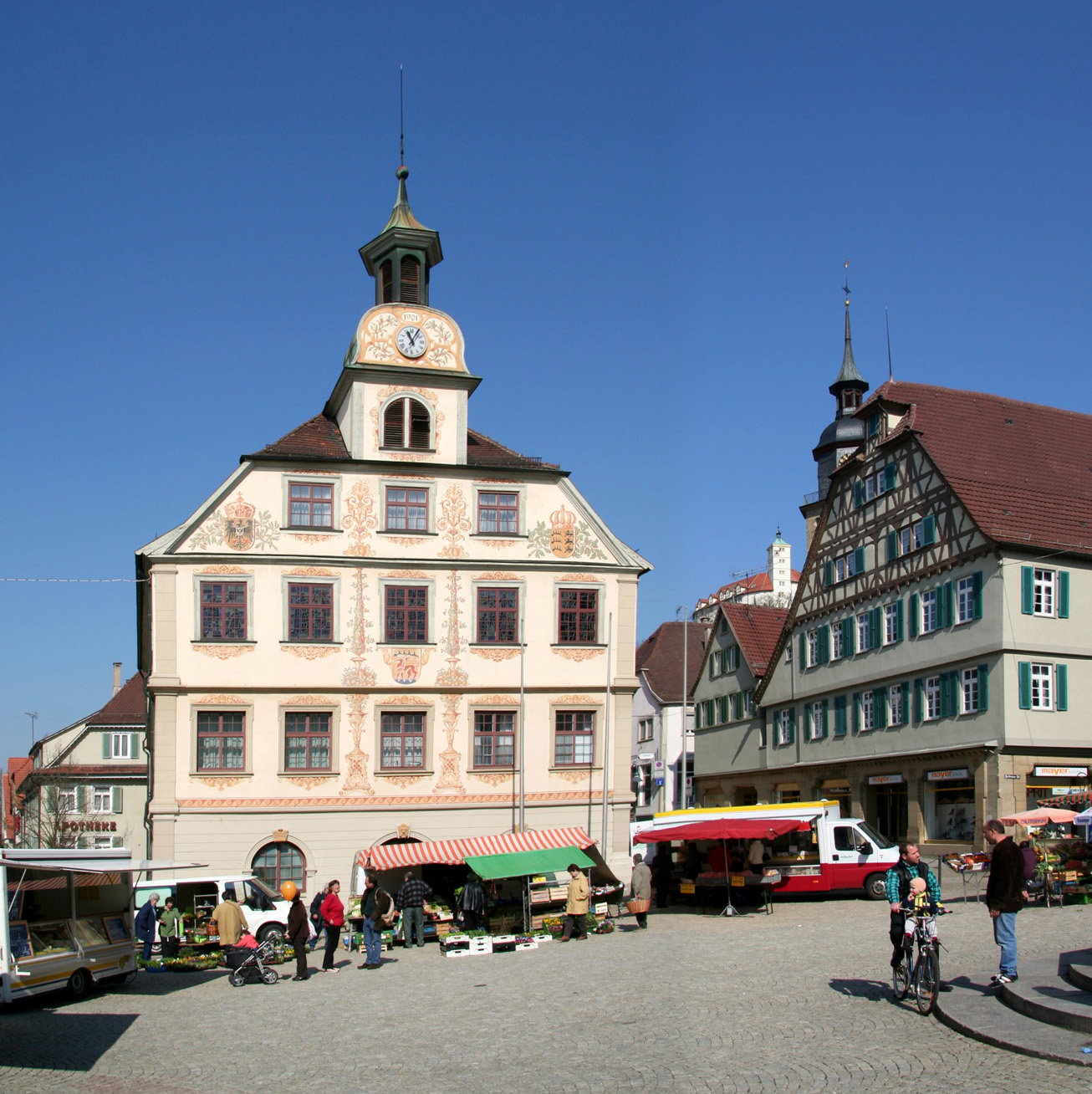

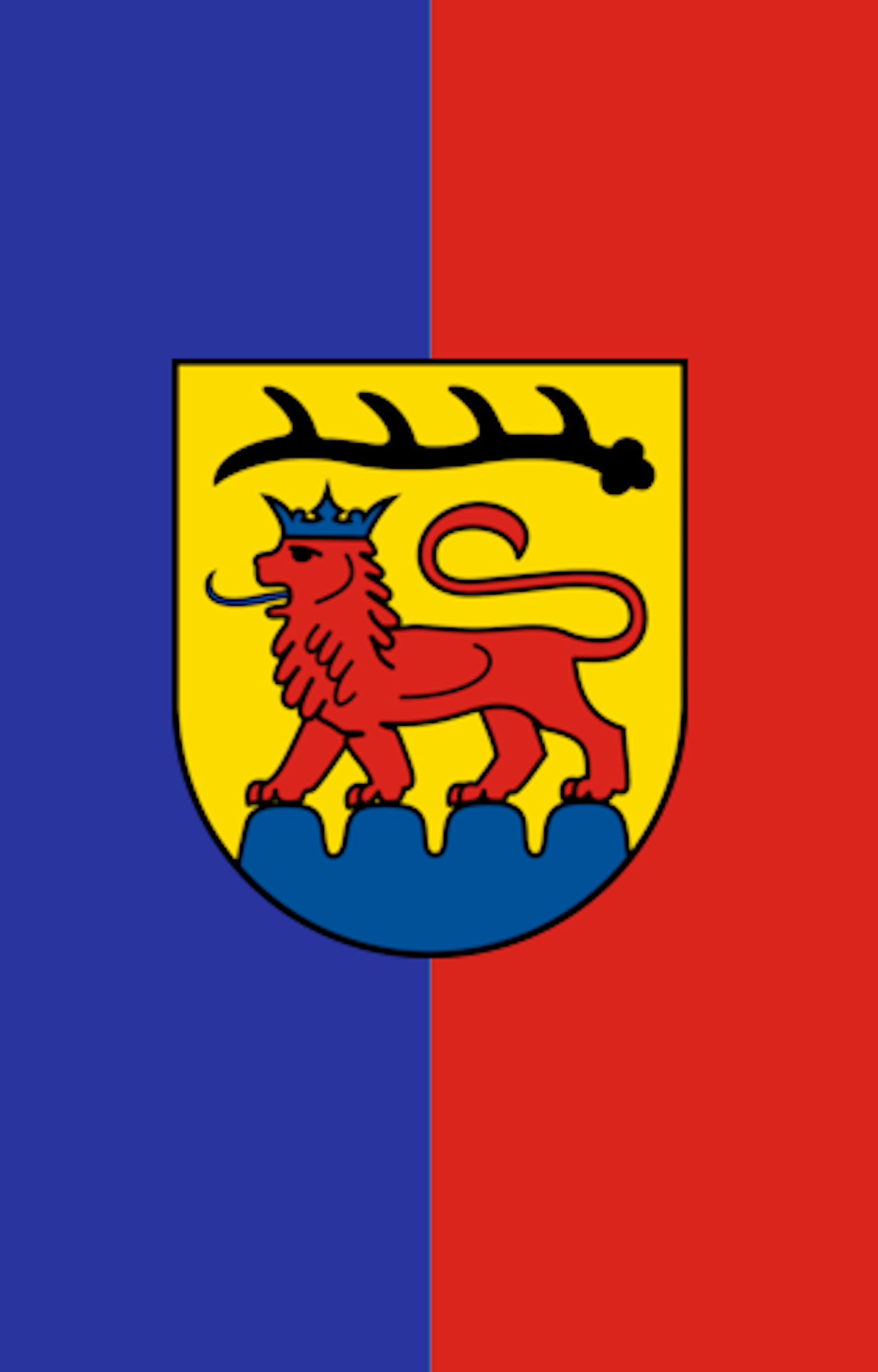
- Flag Coat of arms

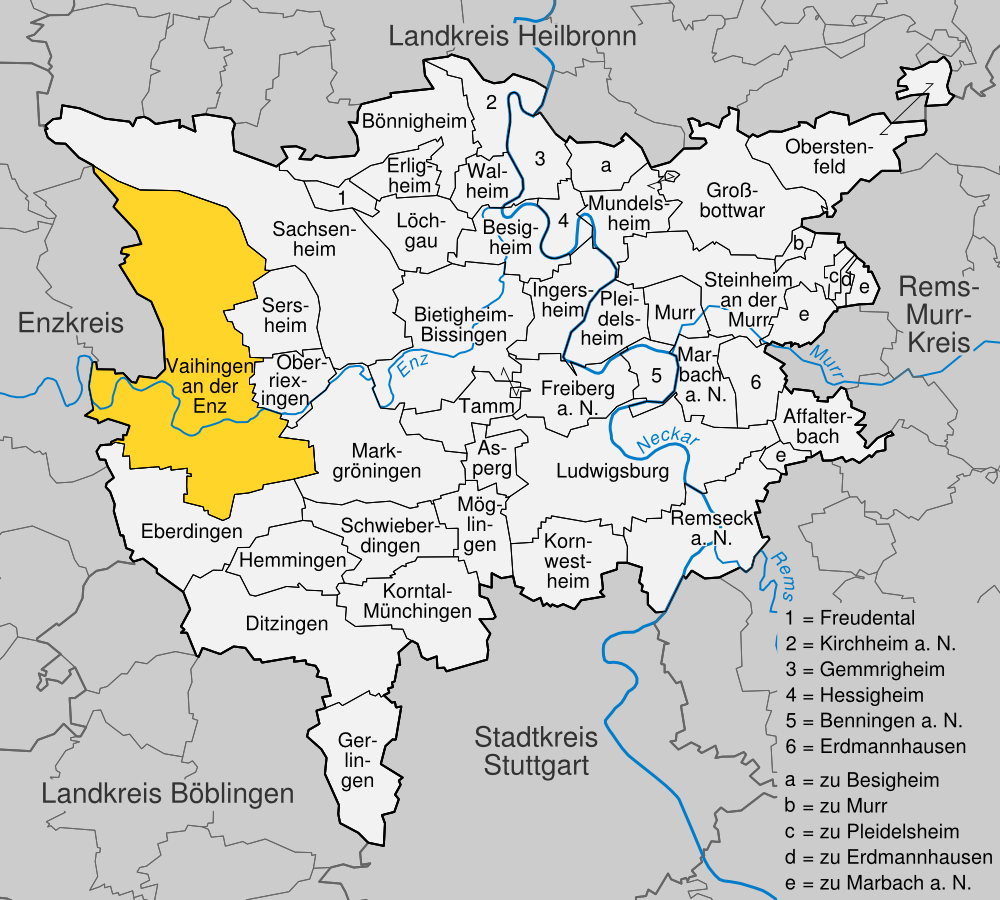
- Location of Vaihingen an der Enz within Ludwigsburg district
- Interactive map of Vaihingen an der Enz
- Location within Germany Location within Baden-Württemberg
- Coordinates: 48°55′58″N 8°57′23″E
- Country: Germany
- State: Baden-Württemberg
- Admin. region: Stuttgart
- District: Ludwigsburg
- Subdivisions: 9

Government
  - Mayor (2022–30): Uwe Skrzypek (Ind.)

Area
  - Total: 73.4 km^{2} (28.3 sq mi)
- Elevation: 217 m (712 ft)

Population (2025-12-31)
  - Total: 28,558
  - Density: 389/km^{2} (1,010/sq mi)
- Time zone: UTC+01:00 (CET)
  - Summer (DST): UTC+02:00 (CEST)
- Postal codes: 71654–71665
- Dialling codes: 07042
- Vehicle registration: LB
- Website: www.vaihingen.de

Vaihingen an der Enz (German pronunciation: [ˈfaɪ̯ɪŋən ʔan deːɐ̯ ˈɛnt͡s], lit. 'Vaihingen on the Enz') is a town located between Stuttgart and Karlsruhe, in southern Germany, on the western periphery of the Stuttgart Region. Vaihingen is situated on the river Enz, and has a population of around 30,000. The former district-capital is now part of the district of Ludwigsburg in the Land (state) of Baden-Württemberg. It is 25 km northwest of Stuttgart, and 15 km west of Ludwigsburg. Not to be confused with Vaihingen, a district of Stuttgart.

== Location ==
Vaihingen lies at an altitude of 200 to 450 metres at the end of the Strohgäus, on the western edge of the Neckarbecken in a valley widening of the Enz. The town centre lies on the east side of the river and is overlooked by the castle Kaltenstein.

== History ==
Vaihingen may date back as far as 799 AD, but the documents are not clear. In 1252 documents refer directly to Vaihingen as a town, established by Count Gottfried von Vaihingen. The town changed hands several times. In the sixteenth century it became a Protestant town. During the Thirty Years' War Vaihingen was besieged by both the Protestant and Catholic warring factions. The consequences of the 1848 revolution caused harvest failures and inflation, and the town population diminished by a large emigration. In the early 1900s, a connection to the railroad network brought more people and industries to Vaihingen. In 1938 Vaihingen became a regional centre.

There was the Vaihingen an der Enz concentration camp during World War II.

== Mayor ==
At the top of the town is since 1256 the mayor and the court, consisting of twelve citizens, including four mayors. Chairman of the court was the official mayor. With the elevation to Große Kreisstadt on January 1, 1973, the mayor bears the official title Lord mayor. He is directly elected by the electorate every 8 years. He is chairman of the municipal council. His general deputy is the first councilor with the official title of mayor.

Mayors since 1893

- 1893–1899: Karl Friedrich Richard Bohringer, Stadtschultheiß,
- 1900–1907: Ferdinand Bentel, Stadtschultheiß,
- 1907–1911: Christian Wilhelm Wischuf, Stadtschultheiß
- 1912–1923: Matthew Häselin, Stadtschultheiß,
- 1923–1926: vacant; the official duties were performed by several councilors as temporary administrators
- 1926–1936: Hermann Linkenheil, mayor
- 1936–1945: Karl Schmid, mayor
- 1945–1954: Ludwig Lörcher, mayor
- 1954–1981: Gerhard Palm, mayor, from 1973 lord mayor
- 1982–2006: Heinz Kälberer, mayor
- 2006–2022: Gerd Maisch, mayor
- 2022–present: Uwe Skrzypek

On May 7, 2006, Gerd Maisch (previously mayor of Tamm), was elected as the new mayor of Vaihingen. He took office on September 1, 2006. Gerd Maisch won against Matthias Ehrlein (Stutensee), and Helga Eberle (Aurich) with 62% of the vote.

On September 1, 2022, Uwe Skrzypek overtook the role of Lord Mayor from Gerd Maisch after winning the local elections.

== Transport ==
Vaihingen is located on the Württemberger Weinstraße and on the southern route of the German Timber-Frame Road, both routes pass many sights.

== Sights ==
- Marketplace

The panoramic sight at the market place includes the town hall and the town church (alternative central/main church). Due to devastating fires in 1693 and 1784, housing facilities had to be rebuilt and their architecture dates back to then.

- Town Hall

A fire destroyed the old town hall building in 1693. It was rebuilt in the same location in 1720, following long years of controversy between the citizens of Vaihingen and the administration of Württemberg. Its paintings date back to 1901. The ground floor was originally used as a sales area for tradesmen.

- The Town Wall

The former Town Wall is partly preserved in the Baedergasse. It is accessible by foot in the direction of the Klingengasse. A broad alley including a stone portraying the coat of arms was built in 1786. Small bridges connect the top level of the buildings and served as escape routes during high flood water.

- St. Peter's Church

The St. Peter's Church is the oldest church in Vaihingen and dates back to 1490 Roman architecture. Modifications were carried out several times. It remained Vaihingen's cemetery church until 1839. From 1871 onwards, it was used as a gym and was rebuilt again in 1980 according to the old style. The town museum can be found on the top floor of the building. Even today, old gravestones from the former cemetery can still be seen.

- The Haspelturm (Tower of Pulley)

The Haspelturm, also called "a thief's tower" is the oldest tower in Vaihingen. An old Roman ornament ("Rundbogenfries") indicates that it might have been built as early as the 13th century. The tower's six stories dominate the old town's silhouette. In the first floor the "Haspel," a kind of pulley that was used to lower its prisoners into the dungeon, can be found.

- The Pulvertum (lit. "Powder Tower")

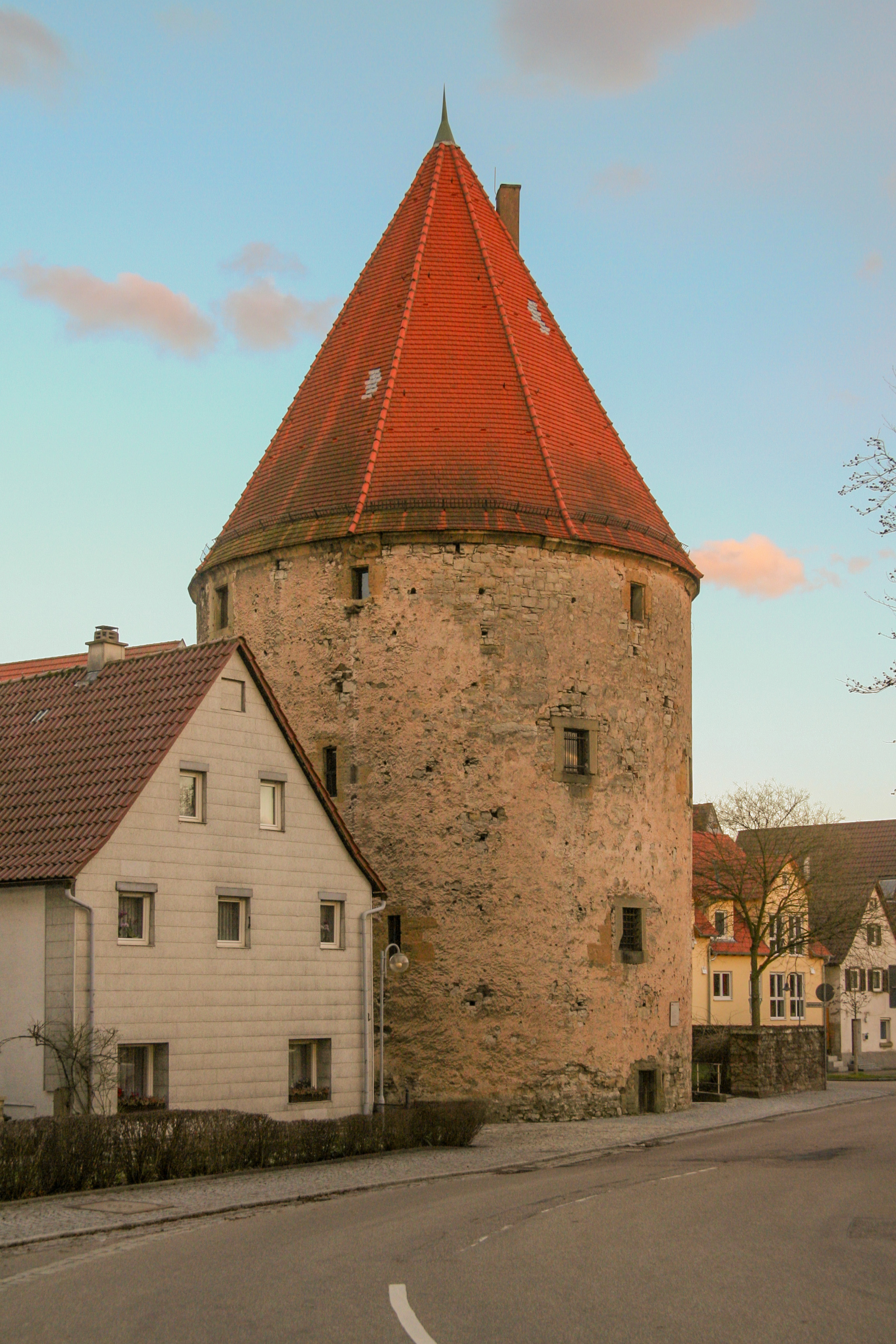
Pulverturm

The Pulverturm is a former prison with massive walls up to three meters thick. The former corner tower of the town's defense wall was built in 1492 and served among others as a prison, a home of homeless people and a slaughterhouse. Today the tower can be used as a place for cultural occasions, in particular art exhibitions.

- The Town Church

The Town Church was built in 1513. Its current appearance came to be after the fire of 1693. Before that fire, the church suffered from destructions because of the fires in 1617 and 1618. The tympanum over the south entrance (carrying the cross) is from 1521. In 1892-93 the inside of the church was rebuilt by the master-builder Dolmetsch. That is when the organ was put in the place where it still sits today. Moreover, galleries have been included. These galleries as well as the outside stairways at the south entrance were removed in the 1960s.

- Kaltenstein Castle

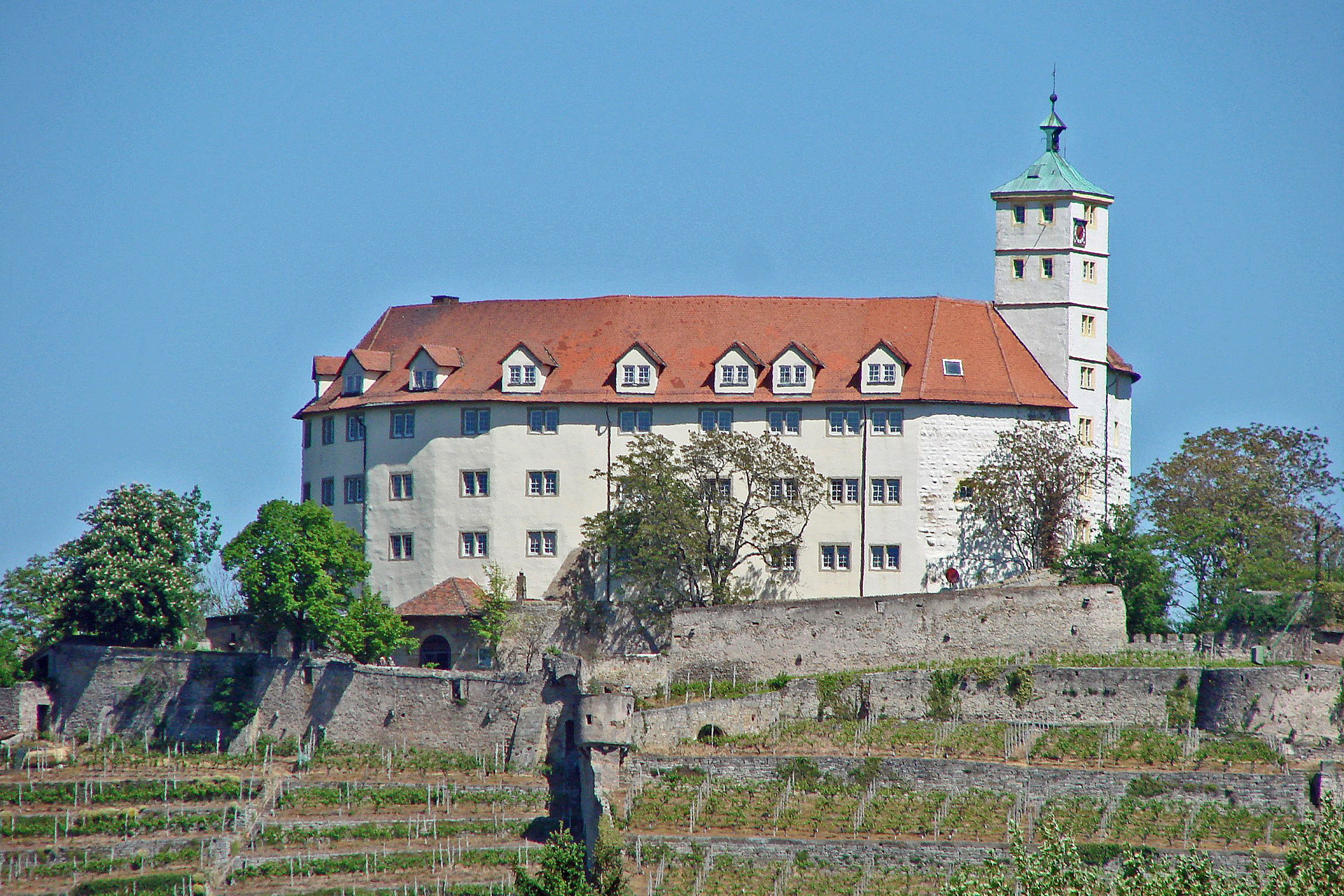
Kaltenstein Castle

Kaltenstein Castle was built on a rocket of Muschelkalk (Middle Trias). It was the former seat of the area's duke and was first mentioned in 1096 as castrum vehingen. Duke Karl Alexander had it renovated in 1734 and later fortified. In the following years it was used as a garrison and a hospital, from 1842 onwards as a workhouse. Today, it is the seat of a social Christian charity organisation ("Christlichens Jugenddorf").

=== Museums ===
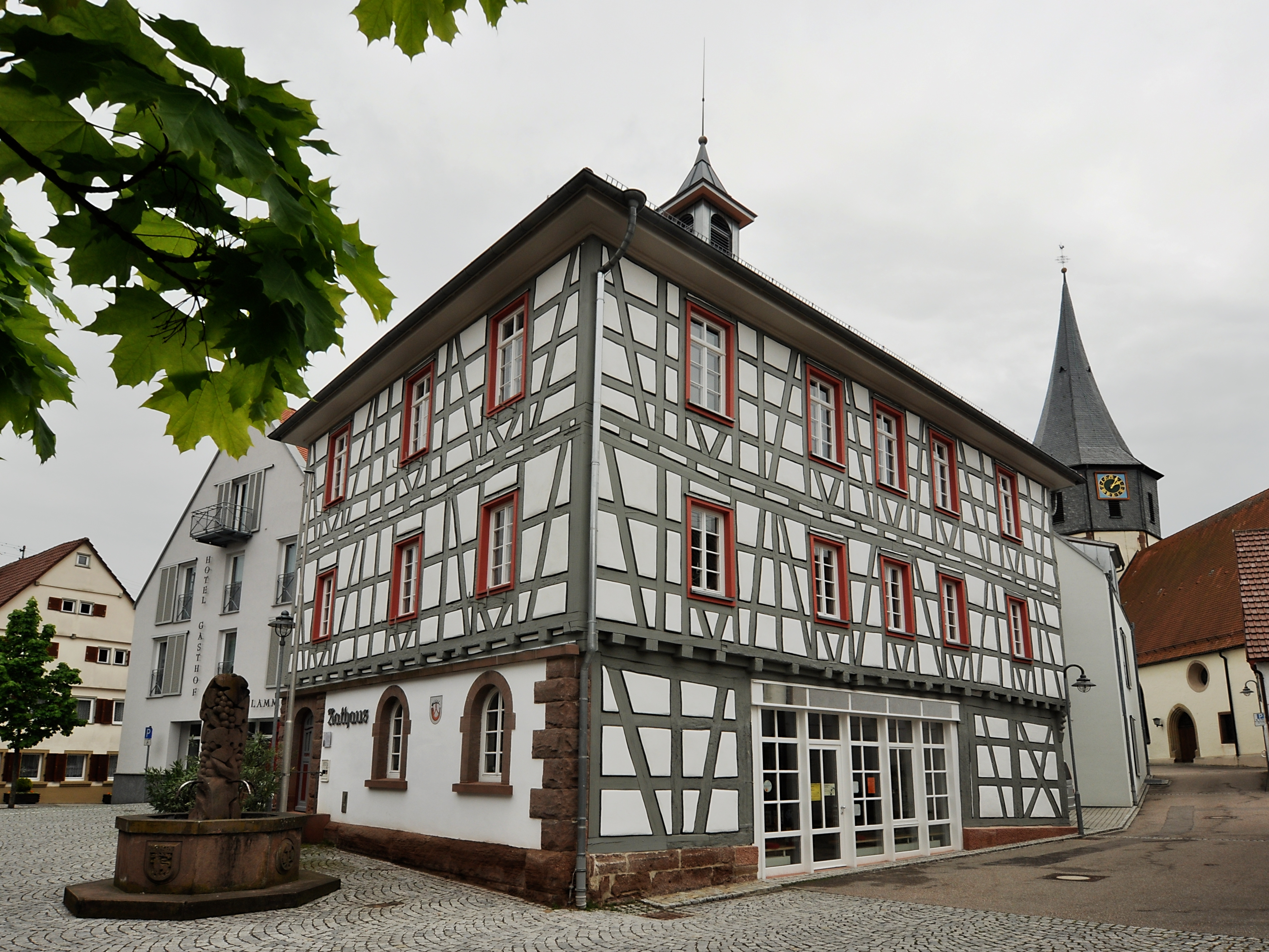
Horrheim Town Hall

Vaihingen has a municipal museum in the St. Peter's Church and a wine museum in the old winery in the district Horrheim.

=== KZ-memorial ===
The memorial for the concentration camp Vaihingen in the Glattbachtal was opened on April 16, 2005. A twenty-minute audiovisual presentation reminiscent of the events of the years 1944 and 1945.

== Culture ==
The May Festival Vaihingen Enz is one of the oldest children's festivals in Baden-Württemberg, first documented in 1687. Despite being held yearly on Pentecost (May or June), it is a non-religious festival. The highlight of the festival is a parade presenting several historic events as well as current sportsclubs and institutions of Vaihingen. Many people who moved away from Vaihingen take the opportunity to visit their hometown on this event.

== Twin towns – sister cities ==
Vaihingen an der Enz is twinned with:

- Kőszeg, Hungary

== Notable people ==
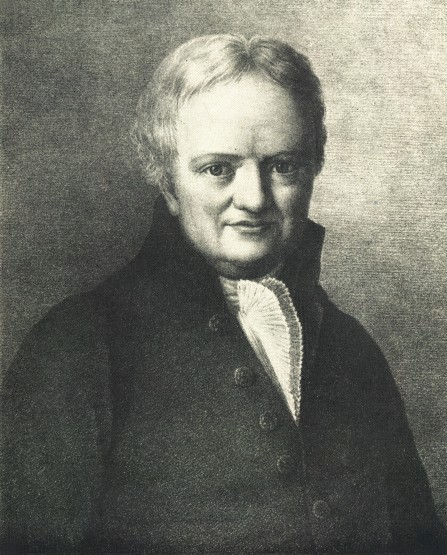
Jacob Friedrich von Abel, c. 1800

- Johann Jacob Zimmermann (1644–1693), astronomer, mathematician and theologian
- Jacob Friedrich von Abel (1751–1829), professor of philosophy, he studied the immortality of the human soul
- Karl Friedrich Hensler (1759–1825), theatre director and author
- Karl Ludwig Friedrich von Roser (1787–1861), an entomologist who specialised in Diptera.
- Karl Gerok (1815–1890), preacher and religious poet.
- Konstantin von Neurath (1873–1956), Hitler's first foreign minister, died on his family estate in Enzweihingen
- Friedrich Kellner (1885–1970), diarist, Chief Justice Inspector in Laubach 1933 to 1945
- Karl Blessing (1900–1971), President of the Deutsche Bundesbank (1958–1969)
- Hartwig Gauder (1954-2020), race walker, Olympic and world champion
- Carolin Klöckner, (DE Wiki) (born 1995), German wine ambassador

== Notes ==
Vaihingen an der Enz is located on the western periphery of the Middle Neckar region, "Region Mittlerer Neckar", with its old name. See also Stuttgart Metropolitan Region

== Literature ==
- Aker, Gudrun and others: Die Stadtkirche in Vaihingen an der Enz. Kirchliches Leben unter dem Kaltenstein in acht Jahrhunderten. Mit Beiträgen von Gudrun Aker, Lothar Behr, Stefan Benning, Anne-Christine Brehm, Hartmut Leins, Manfred Scheck, Marc Wartner. Hrsg. von der Evangelischen Kirchengemeinde Vaihingen an der Enz anlässlich der Grundsteinlegung der Stadtkirchen-Erweiterung vor 500 Jahren. Vaihingen 2013.
- Behr, Lothar and others (Hrsg.): Geschichte der Stadt Vaihingen an der Enz. Vaihingen 2001.
- Keyser, Erich (Hrsg.): Württembergisches Städtebuch; Band IV Teilband Baden-Württemberg Band 2 aus "Deutsches Städtebuch. Handbuch städtischer Geschichte – Im Auftrage der Arbeitsgemeinschaft der historischen Kommissionen und mit Unterstützung des Deutschen Städtetages, des Deutschen Städtebundes und des Deutschen Gemeindetages. Stuttgart 1961.
- Paulus, Karl Eduard: Beschreibung des Oberamts Vaihingen. Hrsg. vom Königlichen topographischen Bureau. Stuttgart 1856.
