= Burke (disambiguation) =

Burke is a surname or given name.

Burke may also refer to:

== People ==
For a list of individuals with the name, see Burke.

- Burke baronets, two baronetcies created in the Baronetage of Ireland
- House of Burke or House of Burgh, ancient Anglo-Norman noble family

== Places ==
=== Antarctica ===
- Burke Island, an island in the Amundsen Sea

=== Australia ===
- Burke Developmental Road, a road in Queensland
- Burke, Wills, King and Yandruwandha National Heritage Place, a heritage-listed historic precinct on the Birdsville Track, Innamincka
- Shire of Burke, a local government area in Queensland
- Division of Burke (disambiguation)

=== Canada ===
- Mount Burke (Alberta)
- Mount Burke (British Columbia)
- Burke Brook, part of the Don River in Toronto, Ontario

=== New Zealand ===
- Burkes Pass, a mountain pass and town in South Canterbury, New Zealand

=== United States ===
- Burke, Idaho, a ghost town in Shoshone County
- Burke (town), New York
  - Burke (village), New York
- Burke, South Dakota
- Burke, Texas
- Burke, Vermont
- Burke, Virginia
- Burke, Washington
- Burke, Wisconsin, a town
  - Burke (community), Wisconsin, an unincorporated community
- Burke Centre, Virginia, a census-designated place in Fairfax County, Virginia, United States
- Burke's Garden, Virginia, a valley and unincorporated community in Tazewell County, Virginia
- Burke Lake, a freshwater reservoir in Fairfax Station, Fairfax County, Virginia
- Burke Lake Park, a public park in Fairfax Station, Fairfax County, Virginia
- Burke Canyon, a canyon of the Burke-Canyon Creek, Shoshone County, Idaho
- Burke County (disambiguation)
- Burke Mountain (Vermont)
  - Burke Mountain Ski Area, a ski resort in northeast Vermont

=== Mercury ===
- Burke (crater), a crater on Mercury

== Buildings ==
- Burke Building, an historic building in Pittsburgh, Pennsylvania
- Burke Building (Manila), an historic building in Binondo, Manila, Philippines
- Burke Museum of Natural History and Culture, a natural history museum in Seattle, Washington
- Burke Library, an academic library of the Union Theological Seminary, Manhattan, New York City
- Burke Mountain Academy, a college-preparatory school in East Burke, Vermont
- Burke Rehabilitation Hospital, a non-profit rehabilitation hospital in White Plains, New York
- John S. Burke Catholic High School (referred to locally as Burke Catholic), a Roman Catholic high school in Goshen, New York
- Burke–Tarr Stadium, a football stadium in Jefferson City, Tennessee
- Edmund Burke School, a college preparatory school in Washington, D.C.
- Katherine Delmar Burke School, independent girls' school in the Sea Cliff neighborhood of San Francisco, California
- Omaha Burke High School, a secondary school in Omaha, Nebraska, United States
- Walter Burke Institute for Theoretical Physics, research center at the California Institute of Technology founded in 2014

== Literature ==
- "To Burke", a 1794 sonnet by Samuel Taylor Coleridge
- Burke, the protagonist of a series of novels by Andrew Vachss

== Organisations ==
- Burke Corporation, a foodservice manufacturer
- The Burke Group or Burke International, a US-based management consulting firm
- Edmund Burke Foundation, Dutch think tank named after the Irish politician and philosopher
- Manley Burke, American legal professional association

== Publications ==
- Book of the de Burgos or Book of the Burkes, a late 16th-century Gaelic illuminated manuscript
- Burke's Peerage, an account of nobility, first published in 1826 by John Burke
- Burke's Landed Gentry, an account of families of the land-holding class, first published in 1833 by John Burke

== Science ==
- Burke's theorem or Burke's Output Theorem
- Burke–Schumann flame, a type of diffusion flame

== Ships ==
- USS Burke (DE-215), a Buckley-class destroyer escort of the United States Navy
- USS Arleigh Burke (DDG-51), lead ship of the Arleigh Burke-class guided missile destroyers
- Arleigh Burke-class destroyer, a United States Navy class of destroyer
- SS John Burke, a World War II American Liberty Ship built

== Statues ==
- Statue of Ernest Burke, a statue of the American baseball player Ernest Alexander Burke (1924–2004) in Havre de Grace, Maryland
- Statue of John Burke, a bronze sculpture by Avard Fairbanks, of the American politician John Burke (1859–1937), in the United States Capitol's National Statuary Hall

== Television and Film ==
- Hair-Trigger Burke, American silent Western film starring Harry Carey (1917)
- Stoney Burke (TV series), an American Western TV series starring Jack Lord (1962–1963)
- Burke's Law (disambiguation)
- The Burke Special, a British TV series hosted by James Burke (1972–1976)
- Burke & Hare (disambiguation)
- The Shannon Burke Show, American radio talk show talk show based in Orlando, Florida
- The Alan Burke Show, American syndicated talk show (1966–1970)

== Transportation ==
- Burke Avenue (IRT White Plains Road Line), a subway station in New York City, United States
- Burke Centre station, a railway station in Burke, Fairfax County, Virginia, United States
- Cleveland Burke Lakefront Airport, an airport in Cleveland, Ohio, United States
- Burke Road, a thoroughfare in Melbourne, Australia
- Burke–Gilman Trail, a rail trail in King County, Washington

== Other ==
- Burke and Wills expedition, an Australian exploration expedition (1860–61)
- Burke Act, a 1906 US congressional act relating to Native American enfranchisement
- Burke Civil War, a conflict in Ireland in the 1330s

== See also ==
- Burke Ministry (disambiguation)
- Berk (disambiguation)
- Bourke (disambiguation)
- Burk (disambiguation)
