= Berk (name) =

Berk is both a surname and a given name. Notable people with the name include:

== Surname ==
- Ailsa Berk, British actress and choreographer, second wife of Ernest Berk
- Ari Berk (born 1967), American writer, artist, and scholar
- Brent Berk (born 1949), American former competition swimmer
- Cem Berk (born 1990), German politician
- Dick Berk (1939–2014), American musician
- Ernest Berk (1909–1993), German dancer, choreographer and electronic music composer
- Henrietta Berk (1919–1990), American painter
- İlhan Berk (1918–2008), Turkish poet
- John van den Berk (born 1967), Dutch motorcyclist
- Josh Berk, American author
- Lawrence Berk (1908–1995), American founder of the Berklee College of Music, pianist, composer, and educator
- Lee Eliot Berk (1942–2023), American former president of the Berklee College of Music, son of Lawrence
- Lotte Berk (1913–2003), German-British dancer and dance teacher, first wife of Ernest Berk
- Lucia de Berk (born 1961), Dutch nurse wrongfully convicted of murder
- Medeni Berk (1913–1994), Turkish banker and politician
- Michael Berk (fl. 1980s–2010s), American screenwriter
- Sammy Berk (1894–1983), American vaudeville entertainer
- Sander Berk (born 1979), Dutch triathlete
- Sheryl Berk (fl. 2000s–2010s), American writer
- Steven N. Berk, a judge on the Superior Court of the District of Columbia
- Suat Berk (1901–2002), Turkish judge

=== Pen name ===
- Ariel Berk, a pen name of American author Judith Arnold (born 1953)

== Given name ==
- Berk Akalın (born 1995), Turkish ice dancer
- Berk Neziroğluları (born 1991), Turkish footballer

== In fiction ==
- Berk, character in the television series The Trap Door

== See also ==
- Berks (disambiguation), includes list of people with name Berks
- Berke (name)
- Birk (name)
- Burk (name)
- Burke (surname)
- Birks (surname)
