= Burque =

Burque is a nickname for Albuquerque, New Mexico.

It may also refer to:

- burqué, a metallic-looking fashion mask also known as Battoulah, Gulf Burqah, al-burghu, and boregheh
- Burque Media Productions, which streamed a debate during the 2016 Green Party presidential primaries
- François-Xavier Burque, an anti-evolutionist published in Le Naturaliste Canadien
- Chand Burke, also known as Chand Burque, an Indian character actress
- Henri A. Burque Highway, part of the Frederick E. Everett Turnpike in Nashua, New Hampshire
- Manuel Burque Hodgson, a Spanish screenwriter, radio host, comedian, and actor

== See also ==
- Berk (disambiguation)
- Berka (disambiguation)
- Birk (disambiguation)
- Birka (disambiguation)
- Burk (disambiguation)
- Burka (disambiguation)
- Burke (disambiguation)
- burqa
