= Bourke =

Bourke may refer to:

== People ==
- Bourke (surname)

== Buildings in Australia ==
- Bourke Court House, a heritage-listed courthouse in Bourke, Bourke Shire, New South Wales
- Bourke Place, a skyscraper in Melbourne, Victoria
- Bourke Post Office, a heritage-listed post office in Bourke, Bourke Shire, New South Wales
- Bourke Street Wesleyan Chapel, a heritage-listed chapel in Darlinghurst, Sydney, New South Wales, Australia

== Places in Australia ==
- Bourke County (disambiguation)
- Bourke Shire, local government area in the Orana region of New South Wales
- Bourke, New South Wales, a town in New South Wales
- Bourke Street, a street in Melbourne, Australia
- Little Bourke Street, a street in Victoria, Melbourne
- Division of Bourke, a former Australian (House of Representatives) electoral division in Victoria (1900-1949)
- Electoral district of Bourke, an electoral district of the Legislative Assembly in New South Wales (1880-1904)
- Bourke Isles, a group of islands and islets forming part of the Torres Strait Islands, Queensland
- Bourke's Luck Potholes, cylindrical potholes or giant's kettles in the Blyde River Canyon Nature Reserve, South Africa

== Other ==
- Bourke v. Beshear, a 2015 United States Supreme Court case on same-sex marriage
- Bourke Airport, an airport located north of Bourke, New South Wales, Australia
- Bourke Award, annual prize awarded by the Royal Society of Chemistry
- Bourke engine, two stroke engine developed by Russell Bourke
- Proclamation of Governor Bourke, document by Sir Richard Bourke in 1835
- Dooney & Bourke (founded 1975), American company specializing in fashion accessories

== See also ==
- Bourke Street (disambiguation)
- Bourke Street, an 1886 painting by Australian artist Tom Roberts
- Bourke's parrot (Neopsephotus bourkii), of Australia
- Burke (disambiguation)
- Earl of Mayo, earldom created in the Peerage of Ireland
- Bourke baronets, baronetcy created in the Baronetage of Nova Scotia
