= Berka/Werra (Verwaltungsgemeinschaft) =

Coordinates: 50°56′22″N 10°04′12″E

Berka/Werra is a former Verwaltungsgemeinschaft in the district Wartburgkreis in Thuringia, Germany. The seat of the Verwaltungsgemeinschaft was in Berka/Werra. It was disbanded in January 2019, when its municipalities were merged into the new town Werra-Suhl-Tal.

The Verwaltungsgemeinschaft Berka/Werra consisted of the following municipalities:

1. Berka/Werra
2. Dankmarshausen
3. Dippach
4. Großensee
