= Birck =

Birck is a surname and given name. Notable people with the name include:

- Sixt Birck (1501–1554), German scholar
- Wenzel Raimund Birck (1718–1763), European composer
- Michael Birck (born 1938), American businessman

Given name:

- Birck Elgaaen (1917–2013), Norwegian equestrian

== See also (homonyms) ==
- Berck
- Burck
- Berk (disambiguation)
- Birk (disambiguation)
- Burk (disambiguation)
