= Birks =

Birks may refer to:

== Businesses ==
- Birks Chemists, an historic pharmacy in Adelaide, South Australia
- Birks Group, a Canadian designer, manufacturer and retailer of jewellery, timepieces, silverware and gifts
- Charles Birks & Co, a former department store in Adelaide, South Australia

== Other uses ==
- Birks (Lake District), England, UK; a fell in the English Lake District
- Birks (surname)

== See also ==
- Birk (disambiguation)
- Birx (disambiguation)
- Berks (disambiguation)
- Burks (disambiguation)
- Burk (disambiguation)
