= Buerk =

Buerk is a surname. Notable people with the surname include:

- Michael Buerk (born 1946), English journalist
- Roland Buerk (born 1973), English journalist, son of Michael

== See also ==
- Berk (name)
- Burk (disambiguation)
- Burke
- Burek
