= Burck =

Burck is a surname; notable people with this surname include:

- Jacob Burck (1907–1982), American political cartoonist
- Joachim a Burck (1546–1610; also Joachim von Burgk, sometimes Joachim Moller), German composer
- Robert John Burck (born 1970), the Naked Cowboy from Times Square, New York City
- William Burck (1848–1910), Dutch botanist

== See also ==
- Berck
- Berk (disambiguation)
- Birck
- Burk (disambiguation)
- Burke (disambiguation)
