= Burk (name) =

Burk is a German given name and a surname derived from it. It is a short from several full names, such as Burkhard or Burkhold. Notable people with the name include:

== Given name ==
- Burk Uzzle (born 1938), American photojournalist
- Samuel Burk Burnett (1849–1922), American cattleman and rancher

== Surname ==
- Adrian Burk (1927–2003), American football player
- Amanda Burk, artist
- Andrea Burk (born 1982), Canadian rugby footballer
- Bryan Burk (born 1968), American film and television producer
- Dean Burk (1904–1988), American biochemist, medical researcher, and cancer researcher
- E. Michael Burk (1847–1878), Irish soldier
- Frederic Lister Burk (1862–1924), Canadian-born American educator, university president, and educational theorist
- George A. Burk, United States Air Force captain, writer, and motivational speaker
- Harvey William Burk (1822–1907), Canadian politician
- Helmut Burk, recording engineer and producer
- James Burk (born 1948), American sociologist and professor
- Jeff Burk (born 1984), American author
- John Daly Burk (c. 1776 – 1808) Irish-born dramatist, historian and newspaperman
- Kathleen Burk (born 1946), professor
- Mack Burk (born 1935), American baseball player
- Martha Burk (born 1941), American political psychologist, feminist
- Thomas Burk (1840–1926), American soldier
- W. Herbert Burk (1867–1933), priest

== See also ==
- Burke, a surname
- Birk (name)
- Berk (name)
- Birks (surname)
- Burks, a surname
