= Brix (disambiguation) =

Degrees Brix (°Bx) is a unit of measurement of sucrose in a liquid.

Brix may also refer to:

== People ==
- Aage Brix (1894–1963), American soccer player
- Adolf Ferdinand Wenceslaus Brix (1798–1870), German mathematician and engineer
- Aglaja Brix (born 1990), German actress
- Emil Brix (born 1956), Austrian diplomat
- Hermann Brix (1912–1982), Austrian stage and film actor
- Kristian Brix (born 1990), Norwegian-born Gambian footballer
- Lisa Brix (born 1996), Danish discus thrower
- Mia Brix (born 1990), Danish figure skater
- Joseph Le Brix (1899–1931), French aviator and naval officer
- Brix Michgell (active 1612–1627), Danish carpenter and wood carver
- Brix Smith Start (born 1962), American-born singer and guitarist
- Bruce Bennett (1906–2007), born Herman Brix, American actor

== Other uses ==
- Brix, Manche, a small town in Normandy, France
- Brix (video game), a 1992 puzzle game for the PC
- Zzyzzyxx, a 1982 video game, also released as Brix
- Brix (database), a database of protein fragments
- Brix (comics), a fictional villain

== See also ==
- BRICS, an acronym for Brazil, Russia, India, China and South Africa
- Le Brix (disambiguation)
- Birx (disambiguation)
