= Birx =

Birx may refer to:

- Birx (surname), includes a list of people with name Birx
- Birx, Thuringia, municipality in Germany

== See also ==
- Birks (disambiguation)
- Brix (disambiguation)
