= Birx (surname) =

Birx (/bɜːrks/ BURKS) is a surname. Notable people with the surname include:

- Deborah Birx (born 1956), American physician and diplomat
- Donald Birx, American physicist and academic administrator
- H. James Birx (born 1941), American anthropologist

== See also ==
- Birks (surname)
- Brix (disambiguation)
- Burks
