= Burks (disambiguation) =

Burks is a surname. It may also refer to:

- Burks Mountain, Georgia, United States
- Burks House (disambiguation)
- Ellis Burks Field, Ranger, Texas, United States, a baseball facility
- Burks' Distillery, Loretto, Kentucky, United States, a distillery, former whiskey distiller, and NRHP-listed building
- Burks v. United States, a 1978 United States Supreme Court case

== See also ==
- Burk (disambiguation)
- Berks (disambiguation)
- Birks (disambiguation)
