= Suhl (Weihe) =

River in Germany

Location
- Country: Germany
- States: Hesse and Thuringia

Physical characteristics
- Mouth
  - location: Weihe
  - coordinates: 50.9500°N 10.0543°E
- Length: 13.6 km (8.5 mi)

Basin features
- Progression: Weihe→ Werra→ Weser→ North Sea

Suhl (German pronunciation: [zuːl]) is a river of Hesse and Thuringia, Germany. It flows into the Weihe near Berka/Werra.

== See also ==
- List of rivers of Hesse
- List of rivers of Thuringia
