= Dippach (disambiguation) =

Dippach (Luxembourgish: Dippech) is a commune and small town in south-western Luxembourg.

Dippach may also refer to:

- Dippach, Thuringia, a municipality in the Wartburgkreis district in Thuringia in Germany

== See also ==
- Dippach-Reckange railway station
- Duppach, a municipality in Rhineland-Palatinate, Germany.
