= Berke (name) =

Berke is a given name and surname. Notable people with the name include:

== Given name ==
- Berke Akçam (born 2002), Turkish athlete
- Berke Atar (born 1999), Turkish basketball player
- Berke Breathed (born 1957), American cartoonist
- Berke Büyüktuncel (born 2004), Turkish basketball player
- Berke Demircan (born 2002), Turkish footballer
- Berke Dikişcioğlu (born 2004), Turkish skateboarder
- Berke Gürbüz (born 2003), Turkish footballer
- Berke Khan (died 1266), a ruler of the Golden Horde
- Berke Saka (born 2003), Turkish swimmer
- Berke Özer (born 2000), Turkish footballer

== Surname ==
- Andy Berke, a Democratic State Senator in Tennessee
- Balázs Berke, a Slovene poet, writer and Lutheran priest in Hungary, in the Slovene March
- Deborah Berke (born 1954), American architect and academic
- Ferenc Berke, (c. 1764 – 1841), a Hungarian Slovene Lutheran
- Joseph Berke, an American psychotherapist
- Steve Berke (born 1981), American cannabis activist
- William Berke (1903–1958), an American film director, producer and screenwriter

== See also ==
- Berk (name), given name and surname
- Birke, given name and surname
- Burke, given name and surname
