= Berka =

Berka may refer to:

== Places in Germany ==
- Bad Berka, in the Weimarer Land district, Thuringia
- Berka/Werra, in the Wartburgkreis district, Thuringia
- Berka/Werra (Verwaltungsgemeinschaft)
- Berka vor dem Hainich, in the Wartburgkreis district, Thuringia
- Berka (river), a river in Hesse

== Other ==
- Al-Berka, an administrative division of Benghazi, Libya
- Berka Buse Özden
- Berka (surname), Czech surname

== See also ==
- Burqa, a type of garment
