= Stephen Burks =

Stephen Burks may refer to:

- Stephen Burks (designer) (born 1969), American designer and professor of architecture
- Stephen Burks (economist), American professor of economics and management
