= Princess Sofia =

Princess Sofia may refer to:

- Sofia Balthazar, protagonist of the Disney Junior series Sofia the First
- Princess Sofia, Duchess of Värmland, a member of the Swedish royal family
- Infanta Sofia of Spain
