= Birke =

Birke is a given name and surname. Notable people with the name include:

== Given name ==
- Birke J. Bertelsmeier (born 1981), German composer
- Birke Bull-Bischoff (born 1963), German politician
- Birke Bruck, German actress
- Birke Häcker (born 1977), German legal scholar

== Surname ==
- Adolf M. Birke (1939–2024), German modern history professor
- Hanne Birke, Danish orienteering competitor
- Kim Birke (born 1987), German handball player

== See also ==
- Berke (name), given name and surname
- Birk (name), given name and surname
- Burke, given name and surname
