= Berks =

Berks may refer to:

== Places ==
- Berkshire, England
- Berks, Nebraska, United States
- Berks County, Pennsylvania, United States

== Other uses ==
- Berks (TV series), Filipino television series
- Berks station, a SEPTA station in Philadelphia, Pennsylvania
- Robert Berks (1922–2011), American sculptor and industrial designer

== See also ==
- Berk (disambiguation)
- Birks (disambiguation)
- Berkes, surname
- Burks (disambiguation)
- Burke's Peerage, a British genealogical publisher
- Birk (disambiguation)
- Burk (disambiguation)
- Burke, surname
- Berkshire (disambiguation)
