= Berkshire (disambiguation) =

Berkshire is a county in England.

Berkshire may also refer to:

- Berkshire (UK Parliament constituency) (1265–1885)
- Earl of Berkshire, an Earldom based on the county
- As "The Berkshires," the Royal Berkshire Regiment

== Other places ==
- Berkshire Lunatic Asylum, later Berkshire Mental Hospital and Fair Mile Hospital, England

=== Places in the United States ===
- The Berkshires, or Berkshire Mountains, Massachusetts
- Berkshire, Connecticut
- Berkshire, New York
- Berkshire, Ohio
- Berkshire, Vermont
- Berkshire County, Massachusetts
- Berkshire Township, Ohio

== Other people ==
- John Berkshire (1832–1891), Justice of the Indiana Supreme Court

== Vehicles and transportation ==
- Berkshire Concept 70, a 1970s competition glider
- Berkshire Flyer, Amtrak train to Pittsfield
- Berkshire Hills Express, former New York Central train
- Berkshire locomotive, a 2-8-4 steam locomotive type
- Berkshire (NH train), former New Haven Railroad train

== Groups, organizations, companies ==
- Berkshire Hathaway, an American investment and holding company
- Berkshire Publishing Group, a publisher of academic and educational books

== Other meanings ==
- Berkshire (soil), soil type
- Berkshire pig, an English breed
- Berkshire Cottages, in the US Berkshires

== See also ==
- Burke Shire, Queensland, Australia
- BerkShares, local currency in Massachusetts
- Berks (disambiguation)
- Berk (disambiguation)
