= Burk House =

Burk House may refer to:

- J.M. Burk House, a historic house in Geneva, Nebraska, US
- Alfred E. Burk House, a historic house in Philadelphia, Pennsylvania, US

== See also ==
- Burk (disambiguation)
- Burks House (disambiguation)
