= Burkes =

Burkes is a surname. Notable people with the names include:

- Ida Burkes or Ida Dorsey (c. 1866–1988), American madam
- Wayne Burkes (1929–2020), American politician

== See also ==
- Burks, surname
- Berkes, surname
- Birks (surname)
- Burke, surname and given name
