= Werra-Suhl-Tal =

- Town
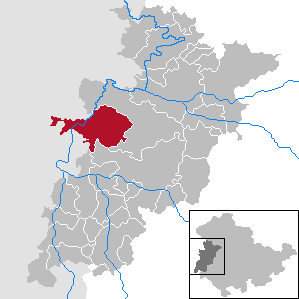
- Location of Werra-Suhl-Tal within Wartburgkreis district
- Interactive map of Werra-Suhl-Tal
- Location within Germany Location within Thuringia
- Coordinates: 50°56′N 10°04′E
- Country: Germany
- State: Thuringia
- District: Wartburgkreis
- Subdivisions: 10

Government
  - Mayor (2022–28): Maik Klotzbach

Area
  - Total: 77.67 km^{2} (29.99 sq mi)
- Elevation: 236 m (774 ft)

Population (2025-12-31)
  - Total: 6,028
  - Density: 77.61/km^{2} (201.0/sq mi)
- Time zone: UTC+01:00 (CET)
  - Summer (DST): UTC+02:00 (CEST)
- Postal codes: 99837
- Dialling codes: 036922, 036925
- Vehicle registration: WAK

Werra-Suhl-Tal (German pronunciation: [vɛʁaˈzuːlˌtaːl], lit. 'Werra-Suhl-Valley') is a town and a municipality in the Wartburgkreis district of Thuringia, Germany. It was created on 1 January 2019 by the merger of the municipalities of Berka/Werra, Dankmarshausen, Dippach and Großensee. Its name refers to the rivers Werra, Suhl (Weihe) and Suhl (Werra).
