= Bourke Street (disambiguation) =

Bourke Street is a main street in the central business district of Melbourne.

Bourke Street may also refer to:

- Bourke Street (painting), an 1886 painting by Tom Roberts
- Bourke Street Wesleyan Chapel, a heritage-listed chapel at 348a Bourke Street in Darlinghurst, Sydney
- Bourke Street (Sydney) a street that passes through Woolloomooloo, Darlinghurst, Surry Hills, Alexandria and Mascot, in inner-suburban Sydney

== See also ==
- January 2017 Melbourne car attack, known colloquially as the "Bourke Street rampage"
