= Burks House =

Burks House may refer to:

- Burks House (Merryville, Louisiana), listed on the NRHP in Louisiana
- Burks-Guy-Hagen House, Bedford, Virginia, listed on the NRHP in Virginia

== See also ==
- Burk House (disambiguation)
- Burks (disambiguation)
