= Birk (name) =

Birk is both a surname and a masculine given name. Notable people with the name include:

== Surname ==
- Ado Birk (1883–1942), Estonian former Prime Minister
- Alma Birk (1917–1996), English journalist and politician
- Angelika Birk (born 1955), German politician
- Anne Birk (1942–2009), German writer
- Carsten Birk (born 1977), German footballer
- Emmet Birk (1914–2000), American professional basketball player
- Matt Birk (born 1976), American professional football player
- Raye Birk (born 1943), American actor
- Sandow Birk (born 1962), American artist
- Thomas Birk (born 1988), German footballer
- Yehudith Birk (1926–2013), Polish-born Israeli biochemist

== Given name ==
- Birk Anders (born 1964), German biathlete
- Birk Engstrøm (born 1950), Norwegian footballer
- Birk Risa (born 1998), Norwegian footballer
- Birk Sproxton (1943–2007), Canadian poet and novelist

== Fictional characters ==
- Birk Balthazar, father of Sofia the First

== See also ==
- Birke, given name and surname
- Burk (name)
- Birks (surname)
