= Angelika Birk =

German politician (born 1955)

Angelika Birk (born 2 May 1955 in Krefeld) is a German politician (Alliance 90/The Greens). She was a member of the Hamburg Parliament and the Schleswig-Holstein State Parliament and from 1996 to 2000 Minister of Women's Affairs of the state of Schleswig-Holstein. 2010 to 2018 she was deputy mayor of the city of Trier. Her department covered the areas of education, social affairs, housing, youth and employment. Since mid-2018, she has been living in retirement in her adopted home of Lübeck and is a volunteer for refugees and on the state board of Pro Familia Schleswig Holstein.

== Family ==
Birk grew up in Krefeld together with her sister Helga Birk and her brother Thomas Birk, who also became a politician for the Greens at state level.

== First professional stations ==
After Abitur, Birk completed teacher training for the subjects German and Philosophy in Düsseldorf and Heidelberg and completed her training as a teacher in 1982 with the second state examination in Hamburg. From 1985 to 1989, she worked as a research assistant on a project commissioned by the Leitstelle zur Gleichstellung der Frau in Hamburg. From 1989 to 1996, together with her colleague Sabine Haenitsch, Birk headed the first women's office in the Hanseatic city of Lübeck.

== Political activities ==
Birk was one of the founding members of the Green Party district association in Heidelberg in 1979. From 1982 to 1985, she was a member of the first Green parliamentary group in the Hamburg City Parliament. From April to May 1996 and from 2000 to 2005, Birk was a member of the Landtag of Schleswig-Holstein. Due to the failure of a renewed coalition with the SPD, due to the surprising lack of a necessary vote in the state parliament for the re-election of Minister President Heide Simonis, the government alliance of SPD and Greens could not be continued. As a result, Birk did not win any of the four Green state parliamentary seats on the 5th place on the Green Party's electoral list. On 31 May 2006, she returned to the state parliament as a successor to the former minister in the Simonis cabinet and retired MP Annemarie Lütkes until 2009. From 2006 to 2009, Birk was deputy chairwoman of the Green parliamentary group in the state parliament.

Birk has always entered the state parliament via the state list.

== Public offices ==
When a red-green coalition was formed in Schleswig-Holstein after the 1996 state election, she was appointed Minister for Women, Youth, Housing and Urban Development in the state government led by Minister President Heide Simonis on 22 May 1996. Although the coalition continued after the state elections in 2000, Angelika Birk, together with Irene Fröhlich, leader of the Green parliamentary group in the state parliament, and her Green ministerial colleague Rainder Steenblock, resigned from office on 28 March 2000 due to the sobering election results for the Greens after the 2000 state elections.

On 29 October 2009, Birk was elected Mayor and Head of Department for Social Affairs, Youth, Education and Sport of the City of Trier for a term of eight years. She took office on 15 February 2010. At the end of 2017, the Trier Greens chose another candidate as her successor for the following term of office.
