= Carrie Berk =

American writer, blogger, activist, and actor

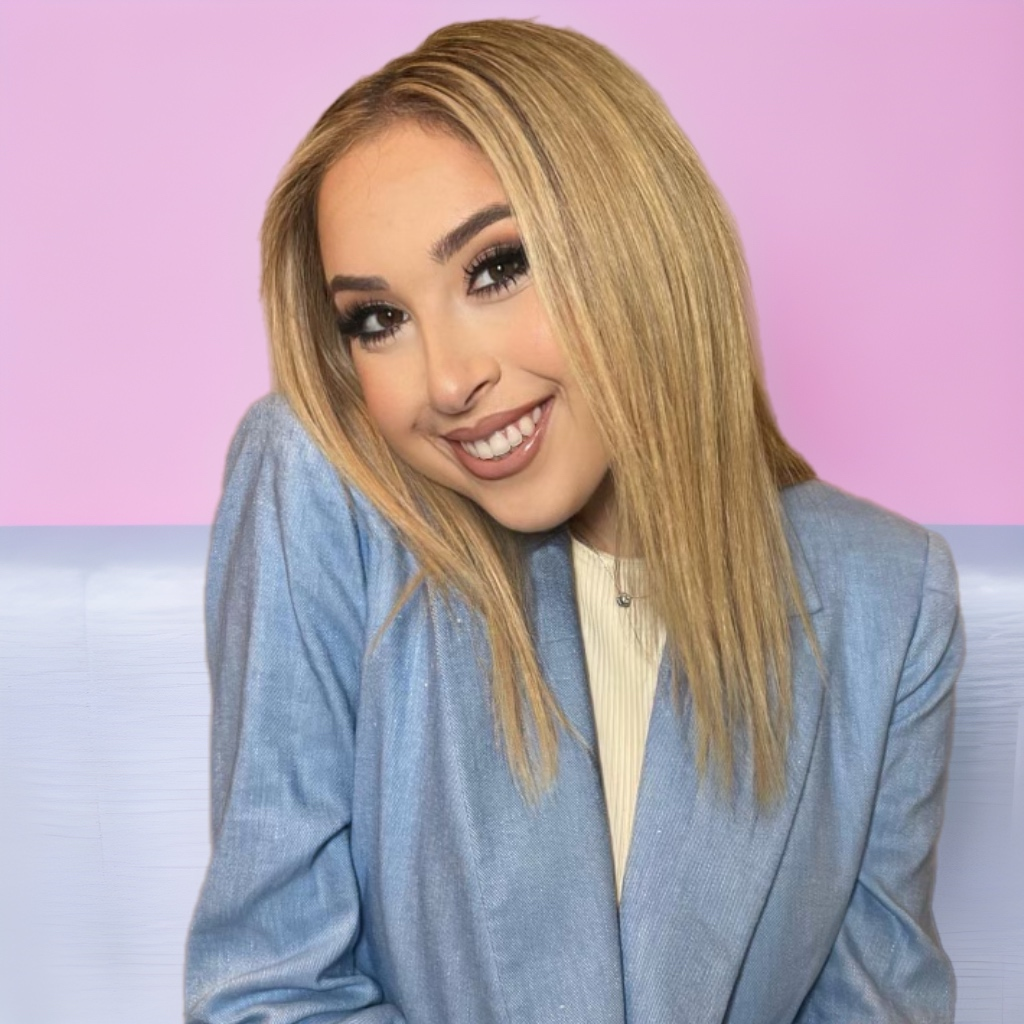
- Berk in 2025
- Born: December 17, 2002 (age 23); New York City, U.S.
- Occupations: Author; blogger; activist; actress
- Years active: 2012–present
- Notable work: The Cupcake Club; Fashion Academy; Ask Emma; Too Much Privilege
- Website: www.carrieberk.com

Carrie Berk (born December 17, 2002) is an American writer, blogger, activist, and actress. With her mother Sheryl Berk, she has co-authored three children's and young adult novel series: The Cupcake Club, Fashion Academy, and Ask Emma. Berk is also the author of a style website, Carrie's Chronicles, and is an anti-bullying activist. She also stars in the Brat TV show Stage Fright. Berk is also known as a social media influencer, appearing in Season 3 of Next Influencer.

Berk is also the writer of two books about her life, including My Real-Life Rom-Com and Mindfire: Diary of an Anxious Twenty Something.

== Life and career ==
Berk spent much of her early life in New York City. Her mother is Sheryl Berk, an editor, journalist, and author known primarily for her work as a celebrity ghostwriter and founding editor in chief of Life & Style Weekly. The elder Berk co-wrote 2004's Soul Surfer which was adapted into a 2011 film of the same name. Carrie Berk also showed interest in writing at a young age and started her own cupcake review blog, Carrie's Cupcake Critique, at the age of seven. While in second grade at PS 6 in Manhattan, Berk developed an idea for a book involving a cupcake club. She took the idea to her mother who, in turn, took it to her literary agent.

In 2012, The Cupcake Club novel series was launched with the first book, Peace, Love and Cupcakes, written by Berk and her mother. It was published by Sourcebooks Jabberwocky. That book inspired an off-Broadway musical of the same name with the Vital Theatre Company, which ran for the first time in March and April 2014. At that time, four books had been published in The Cupcake Club series. In July 2015, Berk and her mother released their second book series collaboration in Fashion Academy. That book also inspired an eponymous off-Broadway musical that was staged for the first time in October 2015 by the Vital Theatre Company. In July 2017, a production of Peace, Love and Cupcakes was staged at the New York Musical Theatre Festival (NYMF). The show was done in alignment with NoBully.org. Berk starred in the production and was given an NYMF award for "Outstanding Individual Performance". In December 2017, she launched Carrie's Chronicles, which is described as a "style empowerment" website.

In May 2018, Berk and her mother started a third book series with the release of Ask Emma on Little Bee Books/Bonnier. The book follows the main character, Emma Woods, who writes a school advice column and must deal with cyberbullying. Later that year, Berk, in her role as teen ambassador for NoBully.org, scripted and recorded a "Girls Against Bullying" video with other teen celebrities for the organization in January 2019. Also that month, the second book in the Ask Emma series, Frenemies, was released. Berk is a social media influencer, mainly on the platform TikTok. In 2022, she appeared in Season 3 of Next Influencer.

Berk released the book My Real-Life Rom-Com in 2025, a book about navigating dating as a teenager. She followed up with Mindfire: Diary of an Anxious Twenty Something in May 2025, a book that discusses how she has coped with anxiety.

== Filmography ==
Year	Title	Role	Notes
2020	Stage Fright	Karina	Television series
2022	Next Influencer	Self	Reality television
2022	Teens Wanna Know	Self	Television series documentary

== Bibliography ==
- 2025, Mindfire: Diary of an Anxious Twenty Something
- 2023, My Real-Life Rom-Com

=== The Cupcake Club ===
Year	Title	Original publisher	Notes
2012	Peace, Love, and Cupcakes	Sourcebooks Jabberwocky	Co-written with Sheryl Berk
2012	Recipe for Trouble	Sourcebooks Jabberwocky	Co-written with Sheryl Berk
2013	Winner Bakes All	Sourcebooks Jabberwocky	Co-written with Sheryl Berk
2013	Icing on the Cake	Sourcebooks Jabberwocky	Co-written with Sheryl Berk
2014	Baby Cakes	Sourcebooks Jabberwocky	Co-written with Sheryl Berk
2014	Royal Icing	Sourcebooks Jabberwocky	Co-written with Sheryl Berk
2015	Sugar and Spice	Sourcebooks Jabberwocky	Co-written with Sheryl Berk
2015	Sweet Victory	Sourcebooks Jabberwocky	Co-written with Sheryl Berk
2016	Bakers on Board	Sourcebooks Jabberwocky	Co-written with Sheryl Berk
2016	Vote for Cupcakes!	Sourcebooks Jabberwocky	Co-written with Sheryl Berk
2017	Hugs and Sprinkles	Sourcebooks Jabberwocky	Co-written with Sheryl Berk
2017	Cupcakes are Forever	Sourcebooks Jabberwocky	Co-written with Sheryl Berk

=== Fashion Academy ===
Year	Title	Original publisher	Notes
2015	Fashion Academy	Sourcebooks Jabberwocky	Co-written with Sheryl Berk
2016	Runway Ready	Sourcebooks Jabberwocky	Co-written with Sheryl Berk
2016	Designer Drama	Sourcebooks Jabberwocky	Co-written with Sheryl Berk
2017	Model Madness	Sourcebooks Jabberwocky	Co-written with Sheryl Berk
2017	Fashion Face-Off	Sourcebooks Jabberwocky	Co-written with Sheryl Berk

=== Ask Emma ===
Year	Title	Original publisher	Notes
2018	Ask Emma	Little Bee Books	Co-written with Sheryl Berk
2019	Frenemies	Little Bee Books	Co-written with Sheryl Berk
2019	Boy Trouble	Little Bee Books	Co-written with Sheryl Berk
