= Burks =

Burks is a surname. Notable people with the name include:

- Alec Burks (born 1991), American National Basketball Association (NBA) player
- Antonio Burks (basketball, born 1980), American basketball player who played in the NBA and in Europe
- Antonio Burks (basketball, born 1982), American basketball player
- Arthur Burks (1915–2008), American mathematician and computer scientist who worked on the ENIAC
- Aubrey Burks (born 2002), American college football player
- Barbara Stoddard Burks (1902–1943), American psychologist
- Brandon Burks (born 1993), American football player
- Charlotte Burks (born 1942), American politician
- David Burks (born 1943), American academic, businessman and fourth president of Harding University
- DJ Burks, American football player
- Edward C. Burks (1821–1897), an associate justice of the Supreme Court of Virginia
- Ellis Burks (born 1964), American former Major League Baseball player
- Eric Burks (born 1972), American former baseball player
- Gregory Burks (born 1980), American former basketball player
- Jewel Burks Solomon, née Burks, American 21st century tech entrepreneur and venture capitalist
- Kenny Burks (born 1959), American former stock car racing driver
- Marion E. Burks (1912–1989), American judge and politician
- Martin P. Burks (1851–1928), an associate justice of the Supreme Court of Virginia
- Mary Fair Burks (1914–1991), American educator, scholar and civil rights activist
- Mary Ivy Burks (1920–2007), American activist
- Michael Burks (1957–2012), American blues guitarist, singer and songwriter
- Oren Burks (born 1995), American National Football League player
- Pinetop Burks (1907–1947), American Texas blues pianist and songwriter
- Robert Burks (1909–1968), American cinematographer
- Ruth Coker Burks (born 1959), American HIV activist
- Spider Burks (1922–1975), American disc jockey who championed jazz music
- Stephen Burks (designer), American designer and professor of architecture
- Stephen Burks (economist), American professor of economics and management
- Tommy Burks (1940–1998), American politician
- Treylon Burks (born 2000), American National Football League player

== See also ==
- Burkes, a surname
- Burke (surname)
- Burk (name), a given name and surname
- Berks (disambiguation), including people with the surname
- Birks (surname)
