= Berkes =

Berkes is a surname. Notable people with the surname include:

- Antal Berkes (1874–1938), Hungarian painter
- Eckart Berkes (1949–2014), German hurdler
- Enikő Berkes, Hungarian ice dancer
- Ferenc Berkes (born 1985), Hungarian chess grandmaster
- Fikret Berkes (born 1945), Turkish Canadian ecologist
- Kálmán Berkes (born 1952), Hungarian clarinetist
- Milton Berkes (1924–2015), American politician
- Niyazi Berkes (1908–1988), Turkish Cypriot sociologist
- Olivér Berkes (born 1992), German-born Hungarian singer and songwriter
- Zoltán Berkes (canoeist), Hungarian sprint canoer who competed in the late 1980s
- Zoltán Berkes (field hockey) (1916–?), Hungarian field hockey player

== See also ==
- Robert Berks (1922–2011), American sculptor, industrial designer and planner
- Burkes, surname
