= Alan Burke =

American broadcaster (1922–1992)

Alan S. Burke
- Born: September 15, 1922; Richmond, Virginia, U.S.
- Died: August 25, 1992 (aged 69); Boca Raton, Florida, U.S.
- Education: University of Richmond
- Occupations: Television and radio host
- Spouse: Claire Canniff
- Children: 2

Alan S. Burke (September 15, 1922 – August 25, 1992) was an American conservative television and radio talk show host who was on the air primarily in New York City from 1966 to 1969 on WNEW-TV.

== Life ==
He was born in Richmond, Virginia, in 1922. He attended the University of Richmond. He became a sportscaster at a radio station in Petersburg, Virginia.

He married Claire Canniff and they had two sons, David Jonathan Burke and Morris Daniel Burke.

His television show was on the local New York City channel 5 at station WNEW from 1966 to 1969 as The Alan Burke Show and was syndicated nationally. After his show was cancelled he moved to Boca Raton, Florida, where he continued to work in broadcasting.

He died on August 25, 1992, in Boca Raton, Florida.

== Work ==
Burke was a pioneer of the confrontational style where he would attack or insult his guest and plant ringers in the audience who would attack the guest. Burke had programs on various Miami radio stations during much of the 1970s and 1980s, where he continued to employ his confrontational style. Burke's best known caller was known only as "Raymond", a presumed burn-out who spouted comically clever poetry, often espousing the virtues of his hero, Alan Burke. Burke was sufficiently well known in the late 1980s to get a guest spot on The Morton Downey Jr. Show, where he, Downey, Tom Leykis, Lester Kinsolving and Bob Grant traded barbs.

On June 25, 1994, Howard Stern reflected upon how he and a friend watched Alan Burke, "the guy who yelled at people."
