= Mount Burke (Alberta) =

Summit in Alberta, Canada

Coordinates: 50.290°N 114.525°W

Mount Burke is a summit in Alberta, Canada.

Mount Burke has the name of D. C. Burke, a former cattleman in the area. Mr. Burke was also an officer of the North-West Mounted Police.
