= Dankmarshausen =

- Ortsteil of Werra-Suhl-Tal
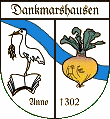
- Coat of arms
- Interactive map of Dankmarshausen
- Location within Germany Location within Thuringia
- Coordinates: 50°55′33″N 10°0′46″E
- Country: Germany
- State: Thuringia
- District: Wartburgkreis
- Town: Werra-Suhl-Tal

Area
  - Total: 11.21 km^{2} (4.33 sq mi)
- Elevation: 235 m (771 ft)

Population (2017-12-31)
  - Total: 971
  - Density: 86.6/km^{2} (224/sq mi)
- Time zone: UTC+01:00 (CET)
  - Summer (DST): UTC+02:00 (CEST)
- Postal codes: 99837
- Dialling codes: 036922
- Vehicle registration: WAK
- Website: stadt-wst.de

Dankmarshausen (German pronunciation: [daŋkmaʁsˈhaʊzn̩]) is a village and former municipality in the Wartburgkreis district of Thuringia, Germany. Since 1 January 2019, it has been part of the town of Werra-Suhl-Tal.
