= De Berk =

De Berk (The Birch Tree) may refer to

== People ==
- Lucia de Berk (1961–2025), Dutch nurse wrongfully convicted of murder

== Windmills ==
- De Berk, Drenthe, Netherlands
