= Burke Lake Park =

Park in Virginia, United States

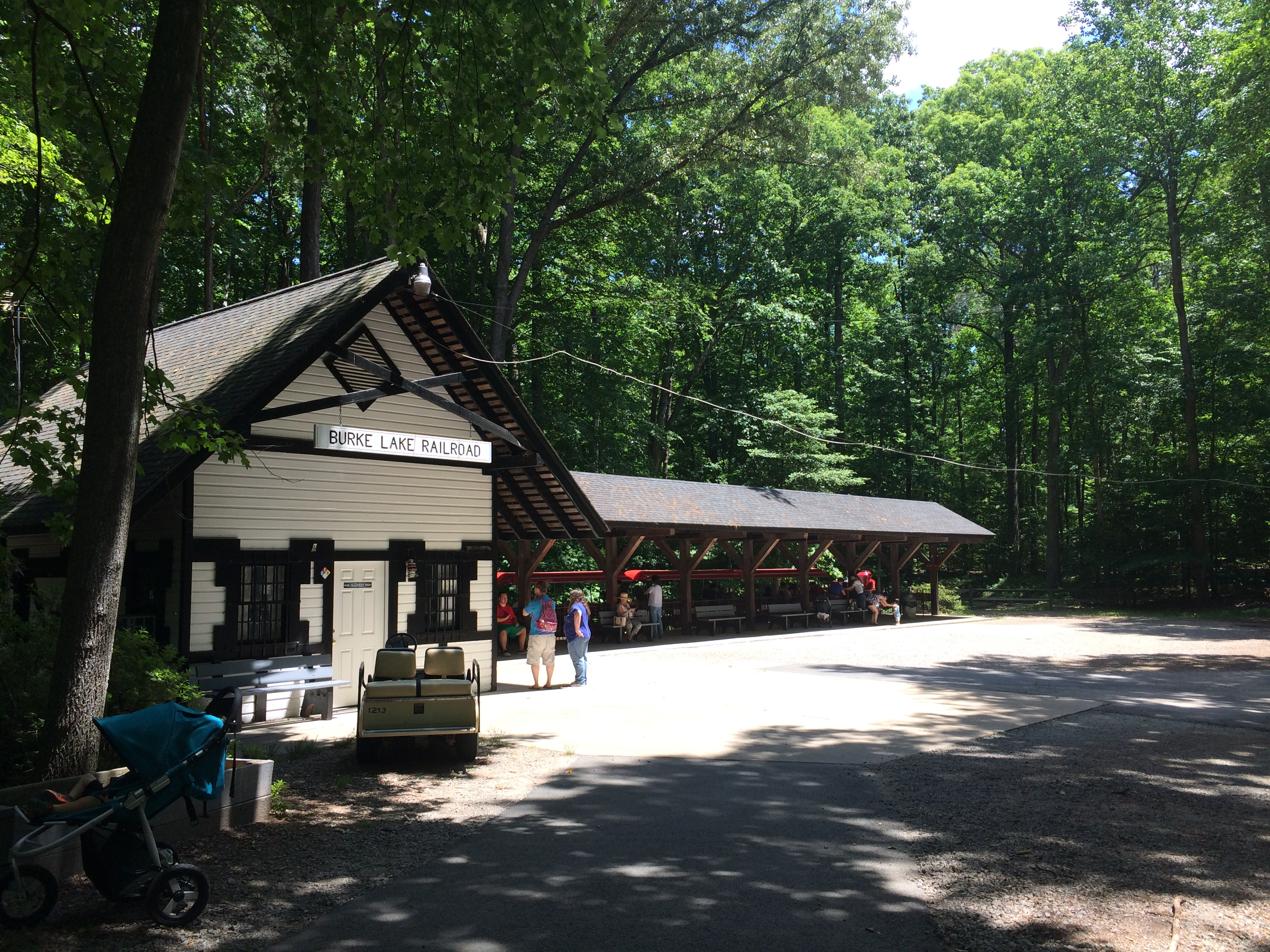
- Burke Lake Railroad
- Interactive map of Burke Lake Park
- Location: Fairfax Station in Fairfax County, Virginia, U.S.
- Coordinates: 38.755114°N 77.296096°W
- Area: 888-acre (3.59 km^{2})
- Operator: Fairfax County Park Authority
- Open: All year
- Website: Official site

Burke Lake Park is a public park located in Fairfax Station, Fairfax County, Virginia, United States. It encompasses Burke Lake. The Fairfax County public park is owned by the Fairfax County Park Authority (FCPA). It was built on land that was purchased by the federal government in the 1950s for an international airport, before the site of Dulles Airport was chosen as a replacement.

== Recreation ==
The park offers many recreation facilities, including miniature golf, a carousel, a miniature train, an ice cream parlor, a fishing pier, campgrounds, and numerous playgrounds and picnic areas. Around the lake is a 4.68 mile (7.53 km) unpaved trail that is suitable for both cyclists and pedestrians.

There is a marina, where visitors can rent boats to take on the water. There is also a conventional boat launch where visitors can launch their own boats. Gasoline-powered motors are prohibited, however.

Additionally, the park has a par-3 disc golf course, which was constructed in 1979.

The park also has a famous 2.98-mile (4.80 km) high school cross country race course. The park hosts many Conference and Regional level races, while also holding the historic Monroe Parker Invitational.

Non-residents of Fairfax County must pay a per-vehicle fee to access the park on weekends April through October. There is never a fee for county residents.

== Golfing amenities ==
Burke Lake Park features an 18-hole par-3 golf course, as well as a driving range and clubhouse. The driving range was renovated in 2017 to, amongst other improvements, have two stories of stalls. Construction of a new clubhouse, which is 4,200 square feet and has dining (Mulligan's Grill), a pro shop, and a patio, was completed the same year.

== See also ==
- Burke Lake
