= Berke Dikişcioğlu =

Turkish skateboarder (born 2004)

Personal information
- Nationality: Turkish
- Born: 2 March 2004 (age 22) Seyhan, Adana, Turkey

Sport
- Country: Turkey
- Sport: Skateboarding
- Event: Street
Medal record
Skateboarding
Representing Turkey

Berke Dikişcioğlu (born 2 March 2004) is a Turkish skateboarder competing in the men's street event. He represented Turkey at the 2026 Mediterranean Games in Taranto, Italy.

== Sport career ==
Dikişcioğlu, as he was already in the nursery in 2010, watched neighbor children skateboarding. He got interested, and his mother bought him a skateboard one week later. At the age of six, he started trying to apply the motions he watched on the internet in front of his house. From the age of ten on, he skateboarded in the street, and developed his skills. His access to a skatepark in Istanbul, where his family settled moving from Adana, made a significant contribution to his development.

Dikişcioğlu succeeded in taking first place in the first competition he entered at Extreme Fest held in Mersin, Turkey in 2015. This result further fueled his desire to become a professional skateboarder. In 2017, he became runners-up in the competition held as part of the Turkey Skateboarding Festival organized by the Turkish Skateboarding Federation. He won the first place in the 2018 Victory Day Tournament, also organized by the federation. He achieved the greatest success of his career in 2021 by becoming the Turkish champion. In 2025, he won the champions title of national ranking first stage at the Mattia Ahmet Minguzzi Tournament.

He was invited to the Turkey national team, and competed in the men's street event at the 2*036 Mediterranean Games in Taranto, Italy.

Dikişciğlu is a member of red Bull Skateboarding.

== Personal life ==
Berke Dikişcioğlu was born in Seyhan, Adana, southern Turkey on 2 March 2004.
