= Berk Trade and Business School =

Coordinates: 40.74473°N 73.93116°W

Berk Trade and Business School is a private, for-profit trade and vocational schools in New York City. It was founded in 1945 and is one of the oldest trade and vocational schools in the city. The school's founder, Irving Berk, was committed to trade and vocational education. The school develops entry-level skills for the building trades, specifically plumbing, electrical installation and building maintenance.

Originally, the school was one of the first trade schools to teach plumbing installation in the country. Berk was a plumber by trade and later decided to add electrical installation to the school's curriculum. The school also taught other trades, such as nursing and phlebotomy, at three different branches before it returned to its original buildings trades model.

== See also ==
- Vocational education
