= Großensee, Thuringia =

Großensee
- Ortsteil of Werra-Suhl-Tal
- Interactive map of Großensee
- Location within Germany Location within Thuringia
- Coordinates: 50°56′N 9°58′E
- Country: Germany
- State: Thuringia
- District: Wartburgkreis
- Town: Werra-Suhl-Tal

Area
  - Total: 3.28 km^{2} (1.27 sq mi)
- Elevation: 236 m (774 ft)

Population (2017-12-31)
  - Total: 191
  - Density: 58.2/km^{2} (151/sq mi)
- Time zone: UTC+01:00 (CET)
  - Summer (DST): UTC+02:00 (CEST)
- Postal codes: 99837
- Dialling codes: 036922

Großensee (German pronunciation: [ˈɡʁoːsn̩ˌzeː], lit. 'Big Lake') is a village and a former municipality in the Wartburgkreis district of Thuringia, Germany. Since 1 January 2019, it is part of the town Werra-Suhl-Tal.
