= Cem Berk =

German politician (born 1990)

Member of the Hamburg Parliament
- Incumbent
- Assumed office 18 March 2020

Personal details
- Born: 23 April 1990 (age 36) Hamburg
- Party: Social Democratic Party (since 2008)

Cem Berk (born 23 April 1990 in Hamburg) is a German politician who has served as a member of the Hamburg Parliament since 2020. He has served as chairman of the Social Democratic Party in Tonndorf since 2013.
