= Brix (database) =

BriX

Content
- Description: database of protein fragments

Contact
- Research center: University of Brussels
- Laboratory: VIB SWITCH Laboratory
- Primary citation: PMID 20972210
- Release date: 2010

Access
- Website: http://brix.crg.es

BriX is a database containing some protein fragments from 4 to 14 residue from non-homologous proteins.

There are very few loops registered in Brix, so to address this issue, Loop Brix was added to the system to help structure non-regular elements. These are organized with clustering of end to end elements, and their distance between residues that flank the top of the peptide. Currently, the system also encourages user submitted structures to be uploaded, so long as they match Brix classes.

== See also ==
- Protein structure
