= Burke & Hare (disambiguation) =

Burke & Hare were serial murderers in Edinburgh, Scotland, in 1827 and 1828.

Burke & Hare may also refer to:

- Burke & Hare (1972 film), a British horror film by Vernon Sewell
- Burke & Hare (2010 film), a British black comedy film by John Landis
