= The Alan Burke Show =

- Genre: Talk
- Presented by: Alan Burke
- Country of origin: United States
- Original language: English

Original release
- Network: Syndication
- Release: 1966 – 1970

The Alan Burke Show is a syndicated talk show that aired from (spring) 1966 to 1970.

== Format ==
Former news editor Alan Burke hosted the program filmed at WNEW Channel 5 in New York City. The program consisted of very pointed, sometimes caustic, exchanges between the host, the guests and the studio audience. The topics were considered controversial at the time, including abortion and sex change operations.

Rather than the celebrities and public figures that appeared on most talk shows, Burke usually hosted counterculture guests who represented the fringes of social, political and religious subjects, including witchcraft, UFOs and life after death. A television listing for 1967 announced that his guests were "The Lady Birds, five young ladies who perform as the world's first and only topless band." Other guests included a nun turned go-go dancer and a transvestite.

More mainstream celebrities appearing on the show included Allen Ginsberg, Norman Mailer, James Brown, Muhammad Ali and F. Lee Bailey, and Raymond Buckland.

== Broadcast history ==
The show initially ran for two hours (1966–1969), but was cut to one hour for its last year of broadcast (1969–1970).

Some sources note that a daily 30-minute version of the program was syndicated in larger cities under the title Dear Alan.
