= Burke Lake =

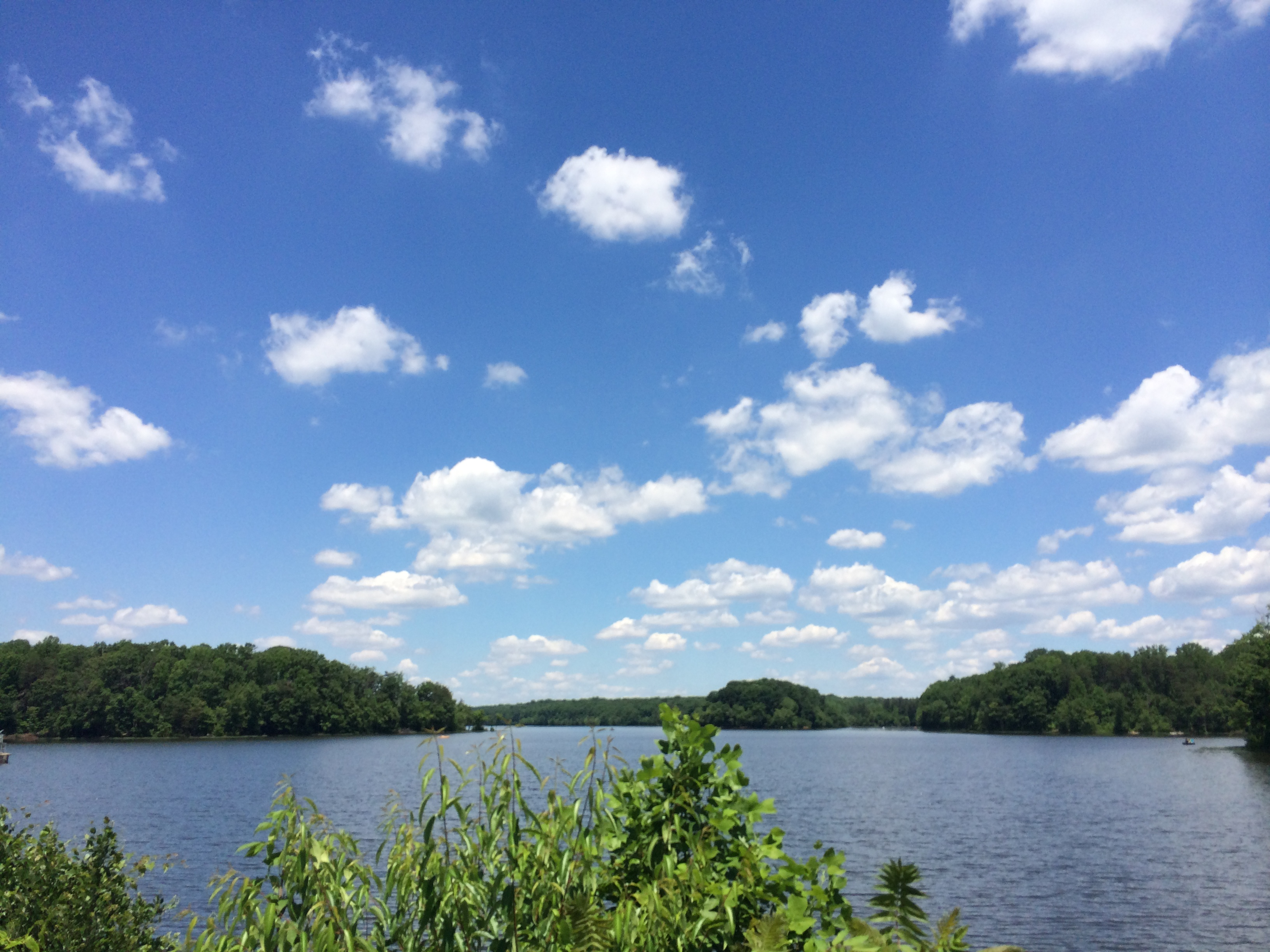
- View of Burke Lake

- Location within Virginia
- Location: Fairfax Station, Fairfax County, Virginia, United States
- Coordinates: 38°45′18″N 77°17′46″W
- Type: Reservoir
- Basin countries: United States
- Surface area: 218 acres (88 ha)
- Surface elevation: 315 ft (96 m)

Burke Lake is a 218 acres (88 ha) freshwater reservoir in Fairfax Station, Fairfax County, Virginia, United States. It is contained within Burke Lake Park, a Fairfax County public park owned by the Fairfax County Park Authority (FCPA). Burke Lake is formed by a dam on South Run, a tributary stream of the Potomac River.

Fairfax County permits visitors to use the lake for fishing, electric-motor, and paddle/row boating. The lake has 4.5 miles (7.2 km) of fishing shoreline, three fishing bulkheads at the state game area, a fishing pier, a public & marina & public launch ramps, and a boat launching dock. Both the fishing bulkheads and the fishing pier are accessible to persons with disabilities. Swimming is prohibited. A 4.68-mile (7.53 km) trail surrounds the lake starting at the marina parking lot. In 2017, Burke opened a new 64-station lighted driving range with 24 covered and heated stations. The new amenities will accommodate practice and classes year-round at Burke Lake Golf Academy. A rentable area with indoor seating is also available for private functions and parties.

Burke Lake is owned by the Virginia Department of Wildlife Resources (VDWR).

== See also ==
- Burke Lake Park
