= Sammy Berk =

- Birth name: Sammy Berk
- Born: 1894; Łódź, Russia (now Poland)
- Died: August 5, 1983 (aged 88–89)
- Genres: vaudeville
- Formerly of: Juanita Saun, Berk & Saun

Sammy Berk (1894 – August 5, 1983), was a vaudeville entertainer at the beginning of the 20th century. He is best known for being part of a dancing duo, Berk & Saun, with his wife, Juanita Saun.

== Early life ==
Berk was born in Lodz, Russia in 1894, where he was part of an acrobatic Russian dancing troupe.

== Performing career ==
After Berk's family emigrated to New York, he performed as part of the Sokoloff Troupe, a Russian dance troupe headed by his uncle. He entered amateur dancing contests, which led to a job at New York's Jardin de Dance cabaret and a role in the show "Lilac Domino" on Broadway in 1914. He also performed a dance duo act with Lillian Broderick.

Berk enlisted in the Navy in World War I. After the war, Berk teamed with a toe dancer named Valda, but the act disbanded after Berk injured his knee and had to take a break from performing. Once healed, Berk was introduced to Juanita Saun and they formed an act. The pair married in 1920.

Berk & Saun's act combined ballroom and tap dancing with acrobatics. Because they did little talking, they were able to successfully tour all around the world with no language barrier. They toured Europe in 1926.

When vaudeville declined, Berk became a talent agent and manager and Juanita retired from show business. Berk managed and performed as a booking agent for Cab Calloway, Jonah Jones, and Duke Ellington.

== Death ==
Berk died August 5, 1983.
