= Burke Corporation =

- Company type: Wholly owned subsidiary
- Industry: Foodservice
- Founded: Ames, Iowa (1974)
- Headquarters: Nevada, Iowa, U.S.
- Key people: Chad A. Randick (President)
- Number of employees: 350+
- Parent: Hormel Foods (2007-present)
- Website: burkecorp.com

Burke Corporation is a manufacturer of pizza toppings and other fully cooked meat products for use in the restaurant, foodservice, and prepared foods industries. The company also specializes in custom product formulation for supply to private foodservice labels, serving more than 1,600 commercial customers. Burke is headquartered in Nevada, Iowa.

== History ==
The business began in Ames, Iowa in 1957 as a frozen pizza producer under the name Pronto Foods. Bill Burke, Sr. joined the company as operations manager in 1964 and purchased the company in 1967. In 1974, the frozen pizza arm was sold, and the company began producing and marketing meat pizza toppings under the new name of Burke Marketing Corporation.

In 1984, the major production line was moved from Ames to its current location in Nevada, Iowa. In 1991, Bill Burke, Sr. handed presidency of the company to his son, Bill Burke, Jr.

Expansions in 2002 and 2004 include the addition of an automatic cleanroom and expansions to production and freezing capacity.

In August 2007, Hormel Foods, based in Austin, Minnesota, purchased Burke Corporation. In 2011, the Ames facility closed, moving its assets and production to the Nevada plant. Bill Burke, Jr continued to run the company until he retired in 2012. Chad Randick currently serves as president, leading the Burke team since 2015.

As of 2019, the company employs about 350 people.

== Products ==
Burke Corporation's range of fully cooked meat products includes various meat pizza toppings, as well as a range of cured meats, meatballs, and sausage products. The company also manufactures custom meat products for clients who manufacture prepared food.

Burke meats are sold throughout the U.S. under the Burke and Swiss American labels, as well as private labels, and are carried by broad-line and specialty distributors. Formulations include standard recipes or custom blends requested by customers.

Burke fully cooked meats are also exported to Canada and other worldwide markets. Burke products are represented in Canada by Chase Global Foods.
