= Kálmán Berkes =

Hungarian clarinetist

Kálmán Berkes is a Hungarian clarinetist.

Berkes was born in Budapest on May 8, 1952. He graduated from the Budapest Liszt Music Academy in 1972. He won second place at the Geneva International Music Competition in 1974, and his Opera Wind Quintet was a prize-winner in Munich in 1975. He was principal clarinetist in the Hungarian State Opera, the Budapest Philharmonic and the Budapest Festival Orchestra, and was a member of the Budapest Chamber Ensemble. He founded the Budapest Wind Ensemble in 1982. His recording of Bartók's Contrasts was a Gramophone Magazine Editor's Choice.

== Discography ==
- Bartók: Violin Sonatas Nos. 1 and 2 / Contrasts, with Jenő Jandó and György Pauk. Naxos, 1994.
- Brahms: Clarinet Sonatas Nos. 1 and 2 / Scherzo / Leider, Op. 92, with Jenő Jandó
- Krommer: Clarinet Concertos, with Kaori Tsutsui and Tomoko Takashima. Naxos, 1995.
- Weber: Clarinet Quintet, Op. 34 / Grand Duo Concertant, with Jenő Jandó. Naxos, 1995.
- Mozart: 5 Divertimentos, with Koji Okazaki and Tomoko Takashima. Naxos, 2000.
- Carl Stamitz: Clarinet Concertos, Vol. 1, with the Nicolaus Esterhazy Sinfonia
- Carl Stamitz: Clarinet Concertos, Vol. 2, with the Nicolaus Esterhazy Sinfonia
