= Annemarie Lütkes =

German politician

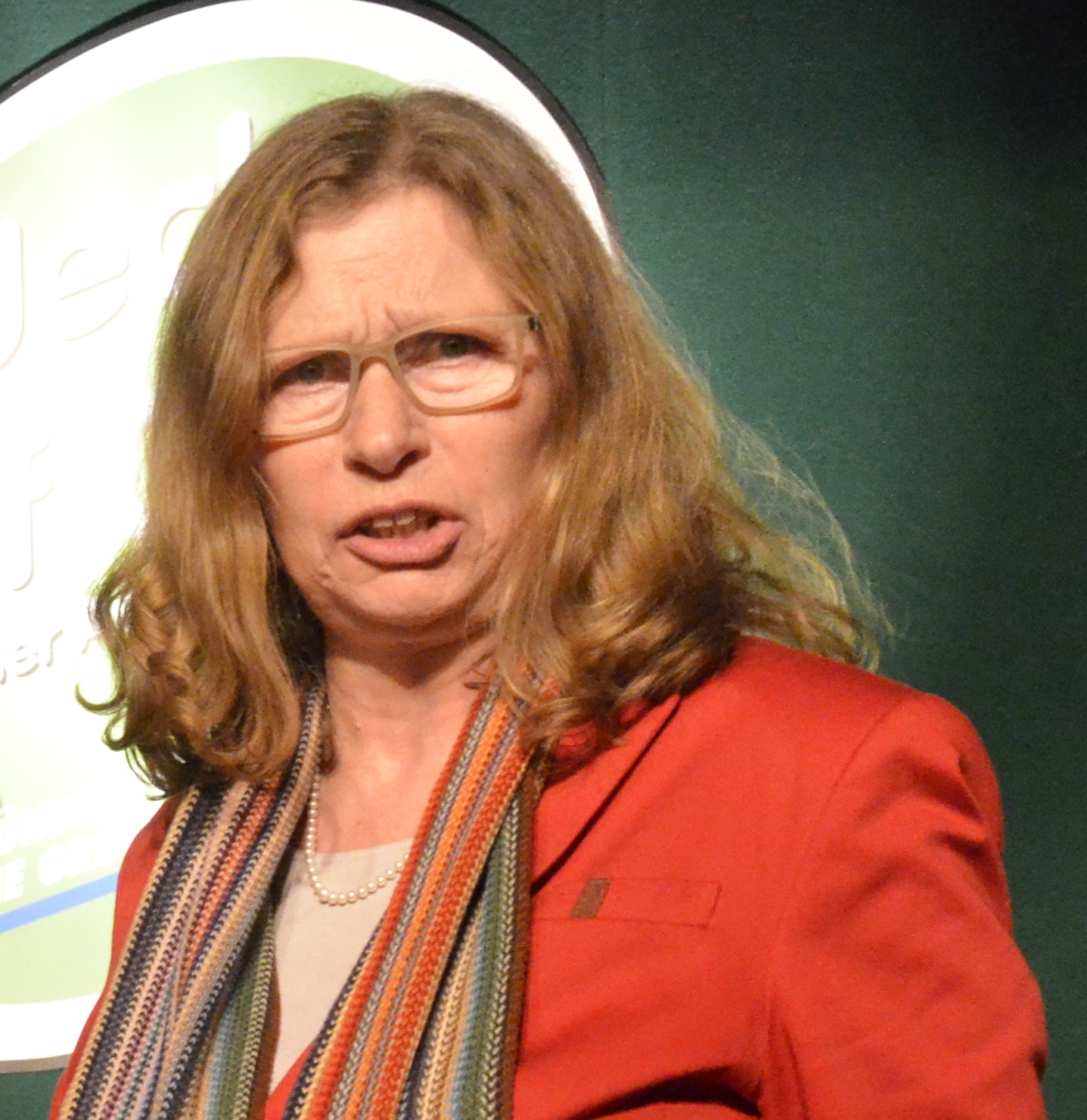
- Lütkes in 2013

Deputy Minister-President of Schleswig-Holstein
- In office 2000–2005
- Preceded by: Rainder Steenblock
- Succeeded by: Ute Erdsiek-Rave

Schleswig-Holstein Minister of Justice, Women, Youth and Family
- In office 2000–2005
- Appointed by: Heide Simonis
- Preceded by: Gerd Walter
- Succeeded by: Uwe Döring

Member of the Schleswig-Holstein Landtag
- In office 2006–2007

Regierungspräsidentin of Düsseldorf
- In office 18 August 2010 – 31 August 2017
- Preceded by: Jürgen Büssow
- Succeeded by: Birgitta Radermacher

Personal details
- Born: 24 June 1948 (age 78) Bergisch Gladbach
- Party: Alliance 90/The Greens Alliance 90/The Greens

Annemarie Lütkes (born 24 June 1948) is a German politician and member of The Greens. From 2000 to 2005 she served as Deputy Minister-President of Schleswig-Holstein and as Schleswig-Holstein Minister of Justice, Women, Youth and Family.

== Career ==
Lütkes was born in Bergisch Gladbach. She studied at the University of Cologne and is a lawyer.

She was a member of the Cologne City Council from 1989 to 2000.

In 2000, Lütkes was appointed Schleswig-Holstein Minister of Justice, Women, Youth and Family by Heide Simonis and became Deputy Minister president. She held both offices until the formation of the First Carstensen Cabinet in 2005. Lütkes stayed in Schleswig-Holstein State Politics and became a Member of the Landtag in 2006, as well as her party's Floor Leader.

In 2007, Lütkes went back to North Rhine-Westphalia and became District President of Düsseldorf.

She retired in 2017.
