= Birk =

Birk may refer to:

- Birk (market place), a demarcated area with its own laws and privileges, the Bjarkey laws
- Reykjavík Airport's ICAO code "BIRK"
- Birk (name), a given name and surname
- Birk, the German name for Petelea Commune, Mureș County, Romania

== See also ==
- Berk (disambiguation)
- Birks (disambiguation)
- Burk (disambiguation)
- Burke (disambiguation)
