= Le Brix =

Le Brix may refer to:

- Joseph Le Brix (1899 - 1931), French Navy officer and aviator
- Le Brix (F715), a French Navy frigate in commissioned in 1948 and scrapped in 1958 which formerly served in the United States Navy as USS Manitowoc (PF-61)
