= J. M. Burk House =

- U.S. National Register of Historic Places
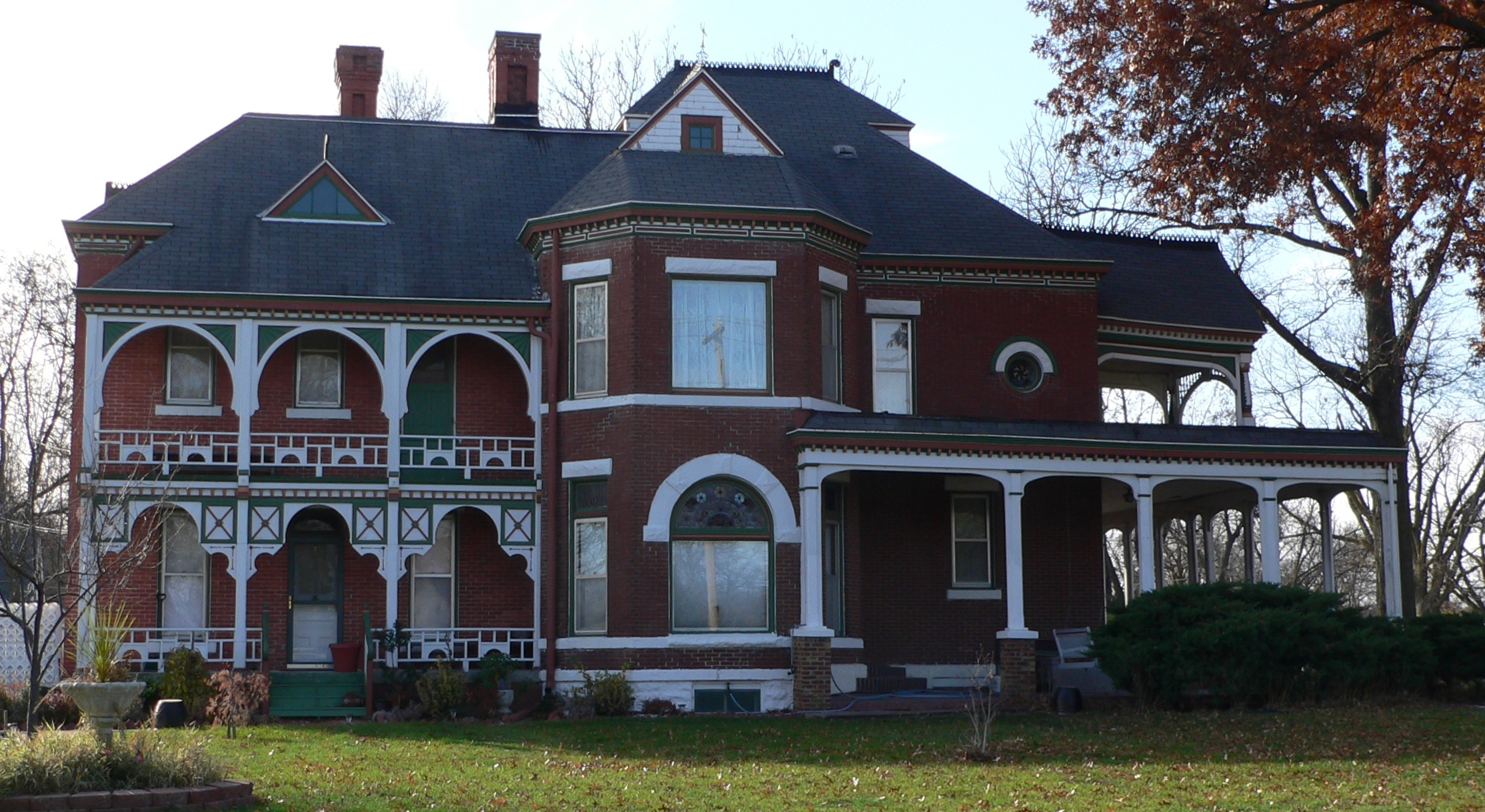
- The house in 2009

- Location within Nebraska Location within the United States
- Location: 331 North 11th Street, Geneva, Nebraska
- Coordinates: 40°31′45″N 97°35′54″W
- Area: 1 acre (0.40 ha)
- Built: 1891
- Built by: Webster, E.A.
- Architectural style: Queen Anne
- NRHP reference No.: 01000169
- Added to NRHP: February 23, 2001

The J. M. Burk House is a historic house in Geneva, Nebraska. It was built in 1891 for J. M. Burk, a hardware store owner, and designed in Queen Anne style (one aspect of which being its irregular massing). In 1916, it was acquired by Walferd C. Peterson who lived here with his wife Rosalie and their nine children. The house has been listed on the National Register of Historic Places since February 23, 2001.
