= Sheryl Berk =

American writer, blogger, activist, and actor

- Born: Sheryl Kahn
- Education: Syracuse University
- Occupation: Writer
- Website: www.sherylberk.com

Sheryl Berk is an American writer. She is the co-author of the New York Times Bestseller Soul Surfer as well as other celebrity biographies. She is the author of the children's book series Dance Divas. She also co-authored three children's and young adult novel series: The Cupcake Club, Fashion Academy, and Ask Emma, along with her daughter Carrie Berk.

Berk has co-written eight bestsellers and also served as an editor for publications such as McCall's and Life & Style Magazine.

== Life and career ==
Berk was born Sheryl Kahn and graduated from Syracuse University. Early in her career, she worked as the entertainment editor for McCall's She also served as the editor-in-chief for Life & Style Magazine when it was launched in 2004.

Berk is a writer and co-author of several celebrity biographies, including eight bestsellers, including Heart to Heart, Wise Girl: What I've Learned About Life, Love, and Loss, and The Rules According to JWOWW. She is the co-author of the 2004 best-selling book Soul Surfer, co-written with Bethany Hamilton and later turned into the 2011 film of the same name.

Berk co-authored three children's and young adult novel series with her daughter Carrie Berk. The first series, The Cupcake Club, started as a two-page story written by Carrie that Berk showed to her agent. The series was picked up by Sourcebooks and included a total of 12 books. The first book in the series, Peace, Love & Cupcakes, inspired an off-Broadway musical of the same name. She also co-authored the series Fashion Academy and Ask Emma along with Carrie. Berk is also the author of the Dance Divas series which inspired the off-Broadway musical Dance Divas Nutcracker. She also authored several children's books based on Disney animated films.

== Bibliography ==
Year	Title	Original publisher	Notes
2000	Heart to Heart	Three Rivers Press	Co-written with Britney and Lynne Spears
2002	Wise Girl: What I've Learned About Life, Love, and Loss	Gallery Books	Co-written with Jamie-Lynn Sigler
2004	Soul Surfer	MTV Books	Co-written with Bethany Hamilton
2011	The Rules According to JWOWW	William Morrow	Co-written with JWoww
2013	Choosing Glee	St. Martin's Press	Co-written with Jenna Ushkowitz
2017	Everything is Possible	Baker Books	Co-written with Jennifer Bricker

== Book series ==
=== Dance Divas ===
Year	Title	Original publisher	Notes
2013	Dance Divas: Showtime!	Bloomsbury USA	
2014	Dance Divas: Two to Tango	Bloomsbury USA	
2014	Dance Divas: Let's Rock!	Bloomsbury USA	
2014	Dance Divas: Step It Up	Bloomsbury USA	
2014	Dance Divas: On Pointe	Bloomsbury USA	
2015	Dance Divas: Showstopper	Bloomsbury USA	

=== The Cupcake Club ===
Year	Title	Original publisher	Notes
2012	Peace, Love, and Cupcakes	Sourcebooks Jabberwocky	Co-written with Carrie Berk
2012	Recipe for Trouble	Sourcebooks Jabberwocky	Co-written with Carrie Berk
2013	Winner Bakes All	Sourcebooks Jabberwocky	Co-written with Carrie Berk
2013	Icing on the Cake	Sourcebooks Jabberwocky	Co-written with Carrie Berk
2014	Baby Cakes	Sourcebooks Jabberwocky	Co-written with Carrie Berk
2014	Royal Icing	Sourcebooks Jabberwocky	Co-written with Carrie Berk
2015	Sugar and Spice	Sourcebooks Jabberwocky	Co-written with Carrie Berk
2015	Sweet Victory	Sourcebooks Jabberwocky	Co-written with Carrie Berk
2016	Bakers on Board	Sourcebooks Jabberwocky	Co-written with Carrie Berk
2016	Vote for Cupcakes!	Sourcebooks Jabberwocky	Co-written with Carrie Berk
2017	Hugs and Sprinkles	Sourcebooks Jabberwocky	Co-written with Carrie Berk
2017	Cupcakes are Forever	Sourcebooks Jabberwocky	Co-written with Carrie Berk

=== Fashion Academy ===
Year	Title	Original publisher	Notes
2015	Fashion Academy	Sourcebooks Jabberwocky	Co-written with Carrie Berk
2016	Runway Ready	Sourcebooks Jabberwocky	Co-written with Carrie Berk
2016	Designer Drama	Sourcebooks Jabberwocky	Co-written with Carrie Berk
2017	Model Madness	Sourcebooks Jabberwocky	Co-written with Carrie Berk
2017	Fashion Face-Off	Sourcebooks Jabberwocky	Co-written with Carrie Berk

=== Ask Emma ===
Year	Title	Original publisher	Notes
2018	Ask Emma	Little Bee Books	Co-written with Carrie Berk
2019	Frenemies	Little Bee Books	Co-written with Carrie Berk
2019	Boy Trouble	Little Bee Books	Co-written with Carrie Berk
