= Division of Burke =

The Division of Burke has twice been used as the name of an Australian Electoral Division in Victoria. Both were in the northern suburbs of Melbourne, but did not overlap:

- Division of Burke (1949–1955), in the inner suburbs of Melbourne
- Division of Burke (1969–2004), in the outer suburbs of Melbourne

== See also ==
- Division of Bourke, a former Australian electoral division in Victoria (1900–1949)
