= E. Michael Burk =

Medal of Honor recipient (1847–1878)

- Born: 1847; Ireland
- Died: February 3, 1878 (aged 30–31); New York City
- Burial place: St. Mary's Cemetery
- Military career
- Allegiance: United States of America
- Branch: United States Army
- Service years: 1862 - 1865
- Rank: Private
- Unit: (New York (state)) 125th Regiment New York Volunteer Infantry
- Conflicts: Battle of Spotsylvania Court House
- Awards: Medal of Honor

Private E. Michael Burk (1847 – February 3, 1878) was an Irish soldier who fought in the American Civil War. Burk received the United States' highest award for bravery during combat, the Medal of Honor, for his action during the Battle of Spotsylvania Court House in Virginia on 12 May 1864. He was honored with the award on 1 December 1864.

== Biography ==
Burk was born in Ireland in 1847. He joined the 125th New York Infantry in August 1862, claiming to be 18 years old. He was captured following the Battle of Harpers Ferry, but was paroled the next day. After his Medal of Honor action, he remained in the hospital until his regiment was mustered out. Burk died on 3 February 1878 and his remains are interred at the St. Mary's Cemetery.

== Medal of Honor citation ==
Capture of flag, seizing it as his regiment advanced over the enemy's works. He received a bullet wound in the chest while capturing flag.

== See also ==
- List of American Civil War Medal of Honor recipients: A–F
