= Burke County =

Burke County is the name of three counties in the United States:

- Burke County, Georgia
- Burke County, North Carolina
- Burke County, North Dakota
