= Bourke County =

Bourke County may refer to:

- Bourke County, New South Wales, Australia
- Bourke County, Victoria, Australia
