= George A. Burk =

Retired Air Force Captain (born 1941)

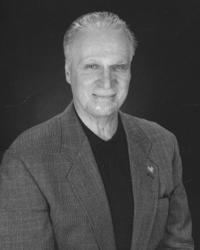
- Captain George Albert Burk
- Born: George Albert Burk; July 9, 1941 (age 85); Pittsburgh, Pennsylvania, U.S.
- Education: Adrian College, Webster University
- Occupations: USAF, retired
- Board member of: Alumni board of directors, Adrian College, 2003–2006

George A. Burk (born 9 July 1941) is a retired captain in the United States Air Force, writer and motivational speaker. Burk was the sole survivor of an Air Force airplane crash in 1970. He has written several books about his experiences.

== Biography ==
From 1952 to 1955, Burk played on the first Sheraden (3.5 miles southwest of downtown Pittsburgh) Little League (Kiwanis) and Pony League (Corliss War Vets) Teams. He was a left-handed pitcher and played first base. Prep League Baseball, 1955–1959. He played on the Beechview Legion Baseball Team 1959–1961. He graduated from Langley High School in Pittsburgh, PA, 1959 and was a four-year Letterman basketball and baseball. The summer of 1957, when he was 16, George was invited to a tryout by the Pittsburgh Pirates at Forbes Field in the Oakland section Pittsburgh. Throughout high school and his college years, George was scouted by the Pirates, Baltimore Orioles and Detroit Tigers. His dream, since he was a young boy, was to become a major league pitcher. An arm injury the summer after his junior year in college, while he played semi-pro baseball in Michigan, ended his dream. He was awarded a basketball scholarship to attend Adrian College in Adrian, Michigan, and graduated in 1963 with a B. A. in Business. He afterward graduated from USAF Officer Training School (OTS) May 1964 and was commissioned a 2nd Lieutenant. His military assignments included Keesler Air Force Base in Mississippi, England Air Force Base in Louisiana, and Mather Air Force Base in California. Captain Burk volunteered for duty in Vietnam where he was assigned to Da Nang AB as the Chief Controller, Radar Approach Control (RAPCON) and Flight Facilities Officer (temp duty).

In July 1968, RAPCON at Da Nang AB was the first military Air Traffic Control Facility in Southeast Asia to win the Command ATC Facility of the Year Award. Between 1967 and 1968 Da Nang AB was one of the busiest airport in the world.

== Plane crash ==
In May 1970, George Burke was the sole survivor of 14 passengers in a military airplane crash. The Convair T-29, piloted by Capt. Robert L. Robinson Jr., was supposed to fly from Hamilton Air Force Base to Spokane, Washington to conduct an operational analysis. About four minutes after takeoff, at roughly 3,000 feet, the aircraft experienced rapid decompression and massive structural failure. The pilot's side of the cockpit blew in, killing the captain instantly. The co-pilot crash-landed in a forested area in the hills near Schellville, California. Burk suffered severe burns and multiple internal injuries and spent 90 days in intensive care where he had two near death experiences followed by 15 additional months in the hospital. He was medically retired from the Air Force in 1971.

The crash was largely forgotten because it occurred the same day four students were killed in rioting at Kent State University.

== Later events ==
On January 1, 1999, George's first book was published, "The Bridge Never Crossed: A Survivor's Search for Meaning". Reporter Deborah Weisberg of the Pittsburgh Post-Gazette wrote a review about The Bridge Never Crossed.

On June 19, 2014, a memorial was dedicated at the crash site of "Visco 57" in which Captain Burk attended along with family members of others who died on the flight.

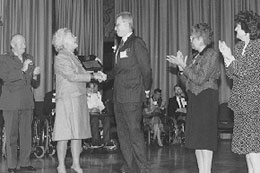
Former First Lady Barbara Bush presents George Burk the Presidential Award for Outstanding Employees With Disabilities. Taking part in the Washington, D.C. ceremony are (from left to right): Marine Corps Commandant, General Alfred M. Gray; Mrs. Bush; Constance Berry Newman, Director of the Office of Personnel Management; and Elizabeth Dole, Secretary of Labor.

== Published works ==
- The Bridge Never Crossed – A Survivor's Search for Meaning., by Burk, George A., ISBN 1-888725-16-8.
- Value Centered Leadership – A Survivor's Strategy for Personal and Professional Growth., by Burk, George A., ISBN 1-888725-59-1.
- My Mother My Friend – The Story of a Boy and the Love of His Mother., by Burk, George A., non-fiction, ISBN 1-888725-09-5.
- Laugh You Live Cry You Die – A Burn Survivor's Triumph Over Tragedy., by Burk, George A., ISBN 978-1596300682.
