= Suat Berk =

Turkish judge

Judge, Member of Ankara bar Association

Personal details
- Born: Suat Hilmi; 2 April 1901 Istanbul, Ottoman Empire
- Died: July 15, 2002 (aged 101) Bodrum, Muğla Province, Turkey
- Spouse: Niyazi Ozman
- Known for: First judge of Turkey

Suat Berk (1901 – 15 July 2002) was the first female judge in Turkey.

She was born on 2 April 1901 in Istanbul. Her birth name was Suat Hilmi. She graduated from the Law school of Istanbul University (then named Darülfunun). In 1925, she was appointed as a justice of the peace (magistrate). In 1933, she went to Berlin, Nazi Germany for doctorate studies. In 1951, she was elected as the member of Ankara Bar Association (Turkish: Baro). She was the first female judge in Turkey. According to her son in 1925 when she was appointed as a judge, women judges were allowed to serve only in juvenile courts in many countries.

After she retired from the public service, she continued as a lawyer of İşbank, Halkbank and Tekel.

== Private life ==
While in Berlin, she met Niyazi Ozman, a Turkish Navy officer n the rank of a captain, and married briefly to him. She had one son named Ahmet from this marriage.

She died in Bodrum, Muğla Province on 15 July 2002, and was buried in Bitez.
