= Brix (video game) =

1991 video game

- Developer(s): Epic MegaGames
- Publisher(s): MicroLeague Interactive Software
- Designer(s): Michael Riedel
- Composer(s): Dan Froelich
- Platform(s): MS-DOS
- Release: 1991 (original); December 1992 (Epic version)
- Genre(s): Puzzle
- Mode(s): Single-player

Brix is a puzzle video game for MS-DOS, developed by Michael Riedel and produced and published in 1991. An updated version with enhanced graphics and sound was published by Epic MegaGames in 1992. It is a clone of Taito's Puzznic, and thus bears strong graphical and some gameplay similarities to Plotting, also produced by Taito. An enhanced version, Brix 2 Deluxe, was released alongside the Epic MegaGames release, with dozens of new levels and a level editor.

== Gameplay ==
A game in progress

Brix presents the player with an array of square puzzle pieces that can be moved horizontally across the playing area. Each piece has a symbol, and when two or more of the same type touch, they vanish. The goal is to make all the pieces disappear within the time limit. As the player progress through the game's 112 levels, Brix adds more challenging gameplay elements, including lasers, reversing gravity, teleporters, elevators, breakable barriers and acid.

== Development ==
The game was written in over 17,000 lines of code in the C programming language with some routines in 80x86 assembly language.

== Reception ==
Computer Gaming World in 1994 said that Brix was "somewhat more interesting than the average brain teaser". The magazine concluded that it was "an entertaining little exercise, although its potential for desktop-based addiction is not quite as high as its package would lead you to believe".
