= Bourke Post Office =

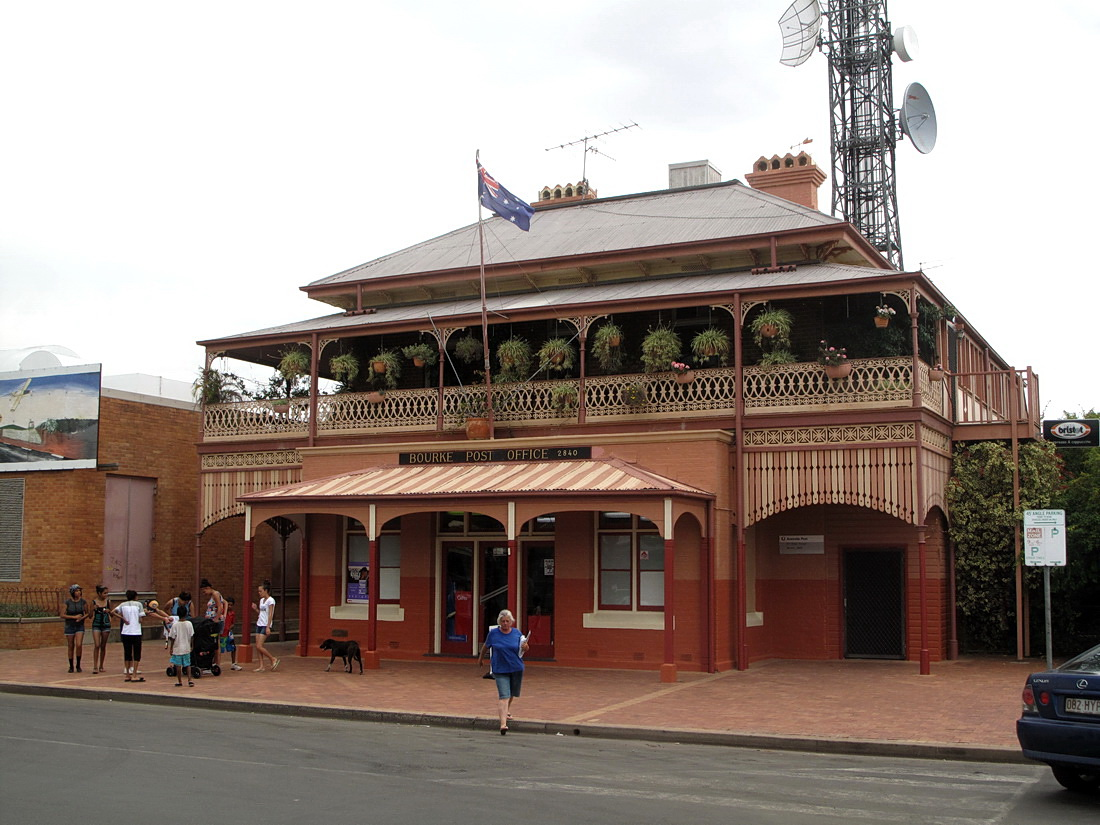

- Location within New South Wales Location within Australia
- 30.0896°S 145.9365°E
- Location: 47 Oxley Street, Bourke, Bourke Shire, New South Wales, Australia

History
- Built: 1880–1880

Site notes
- Architect: Colonial Architect’s Office under James Barnet.
- Owner: Keane Family Trust

New South Wales Heritage Register
- Official name: Bourke Post Office; Bourke Post and Telegraph Office
- Type: state heritage (built)
- Designated: 23 June 2000
- Reference no.: 1404
- Type: Post Office
- Category: Postal and Telecommunications
- Builders: E Heseler

Bourke Post Office is a heritage-listed post office at 47 Oxley Street, Bourke, in the Orana region of New South Wales, Australia. It was designed by the Colonial Architect's Office under James Barnet and built in 1880 by E. Heseler. It is also known as Bourke Post and Telegraph Office. The property is owned by the Keane Family Trust. It was added to the New South Wales State Heritage Register on 23 June 2000.

== History ==
The first official postal service in Australia was established in April 1809, when the Sydney merchant Isaac Nichols was appointed as the first Postmaster in the colony of NSW. Prior to this mail had been distributed directly by the captain of the ship on which the mail arrived, however this system was neither reliable nor secure.

In 1825 the colonial administration was empowered to establish a Postmaster General's Department, which had previously been administered from Britain.

In 1828 the first post offices outside of Sydney were established, with offices in Bathurst, Campbelltown, Parramatta, Liverpool, Newcastle, Penrith and Windsor. By 1839 there were forty post offices in the colony, with more opening as settlement spread. The advance of postal services was further increased as the railway network began to be established throughout NSW from the 1860s. Also, in 1863, the Postmaster General W. H. Christie noted that accommodation facilities for postmasters in some post offices was quite limited, and stated that it was a matter of importance that "post masters should reside and sleep under the same roof as the office".

The appointment of James Barnet as Acting Colonial Architect in 1862 coincided with a considerable increase in funding to the public works program. Between 1865 and 1890 the Colonial Architect's Office was responsible for the building and maintenance of 169 post offices and telegraph offices in NSW. The post offices constructed during this period were designed in a variety of architectural styles, as Barnet argued that the local parliamentary representatives always preferred "different patterns".

The construction of new post offices continued throughout the 1890s depression years under the leadership of Walter Liberty Vernon, who retained office from 1890 to 1911. While twenty-seven post offices were built between 1892 and 1895, funding to the Government Architect's Office was cut from 1893 to 1895, causing Vernon to postpone a number of projects.

Following Federation in 1901, the Commonwealth Government took over responsibility for post, telegraph and telephone offices, with the Department of Home Affairs Works Division being made responsible for post office construction. In 1916 construction was transferred to the Department of Works and Railways, with the Department of the Interior responsible during World War II.

On 22 December 1975 the Postmaster General's Department was abolished and replaced by the Post and Telecommunications Department, with Telecom and Australia Post being created. In 1989, the Australian Postal Corporation Act established Australia Post as a self funding entity, which heralded a new direction in property management, including a move towards smaller shop front style post offices away from the larger, more traditional buildings.

For much of its history, the post office has been responsible for a wide variety of community services including mail distribution, as agencies for the Commonwealth Savings Bank, electoral enrolments, and the provision of telegraph and telephone services. The town post office served as a focal point for the community, most often built in a prominent position in the centre of town close to other public buildings, creating a nucleus of civic buildings and community pride.

=== Bourke Post Office ===
The post office at Bourke was opened on 22 July 1862, with Joseph Becker appointed as its first postmaster. Becker was an employee of the firm Alexander Ross and Co, whose building acted as the first post office. This office took over the function of the Post Office located at Fort Bourke, some eighteen miles (29 km) down the Darling River at Nulta Nulta. Fort Bourke Post Office was closed in 1865. In August 1873 a telegraph office was opened in Bourke, also in a rented premises. The two offices were amalgamated in July 1879, although they had been operating out of the same building since November 1878.

The 1870s and 1880s saw considerable economic growth in Bourke, with river trade booming. As a result, a number of new buildings were constructed in the town, creating a small civic precinct. In 1877 a site for the proposed new post office was selected on a portion of the Government Reserve adjacent to the Court House. A sum of £2,500 was proposed for the erection of an office measuring 35 feet by 20 feet, with a residence comprising two sitting rooms, four bedrooms, kitchen, pantry and stable. A bathroom was added later.

By May 1878 no tenders had been accepted by the Colonial Architect owing to the excessive cost, however by November 1878 the tender of E. Heseler for a single-storey office had been approved, with an underground well and site fence. The new building was occupied by September 1880, however by 1884 extensive repairs were required due to white ant damage and a leaking roof, with the well also requiring cleaning and rebricking. The postmaster also requested the erection of a room for the Telegraph Department.

In December 1884, when it became obvious that alterations would reduce the living space for the postmaster, an additional storey was proposed for the building to provide additional accommodation. For a cost of £1590 an additional storey, verandah and internal modifications were completed in 1889, with a weatherboard stable building also built in 1889.

By 1890 Bourke was one of the busiest and most important post and telegraph offices in the state outside of Sydney, due to Bourke being a major service centre for the west of NSW and the southwest of Queensland. In 1891 one third of the adjacent land to the west of the Office was acquired for a stable yard. Further work was carried out between 1899 and 1900, including the construction of a new entrance lobby in front of the building, the old lobby being converted into a messenger's room. A room for the postmaster was also to be built. A telegraph operating table was also to be installed, with the completion of the additions being advised on 4 March 1901 at a cost of £730. The old timber lobby was demolished in 1903 due to it being deemed unnecessary and eaten by white ants.

The construction date of the rear enclosed verandah is unknown, however it appears to date from around c. 1900-1910s. The rear service wing underwent a change of use c. 1960s with the probable expansion of telecommunications facilities. Installation of the later kitchen to the ground floor residence and bathroom to the upper floor occurred c. 1960-70s, followed by installation of the later toilets and staff facilities to the rear enclosed verandah c. 1970-80s.

Bourke Post Office remains a symbol of the riverboat period of great prosperity in the town and has been the centre of communications to the northwestern region of NSW for over a century.

== Description ==
Bourke Post Office is a two-storey Victorian Filigree style building of cream painted double brick lower storey and reddish-brown face brick upper storey. There is a single-storey painted double brick wing to the rear of the main building section and an enclosed weatherboard skillion verandah to the north side of the wing.

The main building has a wide, two-storey verandah that wraps around three facades and is partly enclosed to the eastern side on the ground floor with weatherboard and the first floor with fibre cement sheet and flyscreen.

The building is asymmetrical (the original section having been symmetrical) and has an early single-storey cream painted brick addition to the centre front facade, extending out from beneath the first floor verandah. The addition has a separate hipped awning of corrugated iron, a white painted, curved solid timber valance and timber posts.

The roof of the main building is corrugated iron, and is two tiered with a hipped roof and shaped eaves brackets. It sits above a hipped and skillion first floor verandah awning supported on green painted cast iron posts with white painted original cast iron brackets and balustrade.

The first floor timber boarded verandah is supported on cast iron posts similar to the upper posts, with an original white painted, deep, curved, vertical paling valance.

There are two cream painted corbelled chimneys to the main building penetrating the top roof ridge lines on the east and west sides of the roof. Between the chimneys is an intrusive air conditioning unit. Two additional face brick corbelled chimneys are located to the rear wing on the east and west sides and another face brick single chimney to the current laundry in the weatherboard skillion addition at the far eastern end. Another intrusive air conditioning unit is located at the centre of the wing.

Doors and windows appear largely original. They include timber sash windows and French doors with flat brick arches (rubbed red brick on the top floor), painted stone sills and some polished stone thresholds to the upper floor verandah doors.

Signage to the building comprises the building title and postcode above the front addition awning and a standard Australia Post sign to the east of the building, not attached. There is also a small brass plaque located to the left of the front addition facade indicating the 1890 flood level.

The interior ground floor is divided into three main areas, including the small, carpeted retail area with standard modern Australia Post fitout comprising display wall panelling, security mirrors and laminated counters in a grey colour scheme. To the rear of the retail area is the vinyl-floored mail sorting and storage area, post boxes and staff facilities to the rear verandah. Also to the rear is the carpeted residential section of the ground floor including part of the rear, enclosed verandah.

The mail area in particular has been considerably altered, with modern shelving, post boxes, blocked fireplaces and later openings. The walls to this area are rendered and painted grey and the ground floor retains a c. 1920s plaster and batten ceiling. Original elements have been retained, including columns and pilasters with decorated capitals and original wall vents. The ground floor residential area appears largely original, retaining doors, windows, architraves, skirting, picture rails and cornices, excepting the substantially changed residential kitchen currently undergoing renovation.

The residence, incorporating the upper floor and rear ground floor, generally retains its original doors and windows, with French doors and fanlights to the upper verandah, later screen doors, varnished joinery, grey marble (upper floor), or slate and timber fireplaces (ground floor) and stair.

The stair comprises turned timber posts and balusters and carved brackets on the outer stringer, with a varnished timber boarded lining to the under side of the upper flight and timber side panelling. The walls have been re-rendered and painted, the former library being wallpapered. Some ceilings have been altered with battens and new ceilings. The upper floor has a complete new, lowered, plasterboard ceiling and cornice with air conditioning registers installed. Unsympathetic light fittings have been installed to the ground and upper floors. The upper floor verandah has an unfinished narrow timber boarded floor and a painted v-jointed boarded soffit.

There is a domed old brick tank in the rear yard of the main building and an English bond brick outbuilding, which is attached to the Post Office enclosed verandah via a covered way. The outbuilding appears to be of original construction as the former service wing containing kitchen and other services. The openings to the southern side have been bricked in, and it is currently used by Telstra, with a verandah on the north side. The outbuilding is currently separated from Post Office usage, however it remains part of the original curtilage. A carport and rusticated weatherboard shed, neither significant, are located to the rear of the backyard.

A large Telstra communications tower to the rear of the building dominates the roofscape. To the western side of the post office is a highly unsympathetic, austere single-storey Telstra exchange building in red brick. To the east is the brick and tile National Australia Bank. Bourke Post Office is located within a predominantly single-storey, wide streetscape, punctuated by the two-storey buildings such as the Fitzgerald Post Office Hotel opposite and other taller facades. Vegetation is sparse to the street and shopfront awnings are common.

Telephone boxes have been installed on the pavement to the front left of the Lachlan Street facade. Slender sympathetic street lighting poles have been well spaced out along the street, as well as young trees in traffic islands to the sides of the building. Pavers have been laid to form the footpath and abut the Post Office ground floor walls.

Bourke Post Office was reported to appear to generally be in very good condition excepting general wear and tear as at 14 April 2000.

There is archaeological potential within the grounds, particularly within the vicinity of the early brick tank and former service wing. The openings to the former service wing have been bricked in and it has been isolated for use by Telstra. The exterior appears generally intact; however, the interior was inaccessible.

The Bourke Post Office is largely intact, and retains the features which make it culturally significant, including architectural details such as the decorative timber valance, iron balcony railings, iron brackets, and its overall scale, form and style.

== Heritage listing ==
Bourke Post Office is significant at a State level for its historical associations, aesthetic qualities and social meaning. Bourke Post Office is historically significant because it was the centre of communications for the northwestern region of NSW for over a century. The form and scale of Bourke Post Office reflects the riverboat period of great prosperity in the town. Bourke Post Office also provides evidence of the changing nature of postal and telecommunications practices in NSW, particularly in servicing a widely dispersed regional community. Bourke Post Office is aesthetically significant because it is a strong example of the Victorian Filigree style, and makes an important aesthetic contribution to the civic precinct in Bourke. Bourke Post Office is also associated with the Colonial Architect's Office under James Barnet. Bourke Post Office is also considered to be significant to the Bourke community's sense of place.

Bourke Post Office was listed on the New South Wales State Heritage Register on 23 June 2000 having satisfied the following criteria.

The place is important in demonstrating the course, or pattern, of cultural or natural history in New South Wales.

Bourke Post Office is historically significant because it became one of the busiest post and telegraph offices in the state outside of Sydney in the late nineteenth century, as Bourke was a major service centre for the west of NSW and the southwest of QLD. The post office has been the centre of communications for the community for over a century. The form and scale of Bourke Post Office also reflect the riverboat period of great prosperity in the town. Bourke Post Office is associated with the Colonial Architect's Office under James Barnet, which designed and maintained a number of post offices across NSW between 1865 and 1890.

Bourke Post Office also provides evidence of the changing nature of postal and telecommunications practices in NSW, particularly in servicing a widely dispersed regional community.

The additions made to Bourke Post Office to improve the accommodation facilities for the residing postmasters reflects the changing requirements and standards in working conditions in NSW.

The place is important in demonstrating aesthetic characteristics and/or a high degree of creative or technical achievement in New South Wales.

Bourke Post Office is aesthetically significant because it is a fine example of the Victorian Filigree style. The architectural style and location of the building also make it a focal point of the civic precinct of Bourke, endowing it with landmark qualities.

The place has a strong or special association with a particular community or cultural group in New South Wales for social, cultural or spiritual reasons.

As a prominent civic building, and as the centre of communications for the region, Bourke Post Office is considered to be significant to the Bourke community's sense of place.

The place has potential to yield information that will contribute to an understanding of the cultural or natural history of New South Wales.

The site has some potential to contain archaeological information which may provide information relating to the previous use of the site and the evolution of the building and out-buildings associated with the use by the post office.

The place possesses uncommon, rare or endangered aspects of the cultural or natural history of New South Wales.

Bourke Post Office is an archetypal example of a country post office, as it is strongly expressive of Australian country architecture in the late Victorian period.

The place is important in demonstrating the principal characteristics of a class of cultural or natural places/environments in New South Wales.

Bourke Post Office is a good example of the Victorian Filigree style of architecture. It is part of the group of nineteenth century post offices in NSW designed by the Colonial Architect's Office under James Barnet.
