= Bourke Court House =

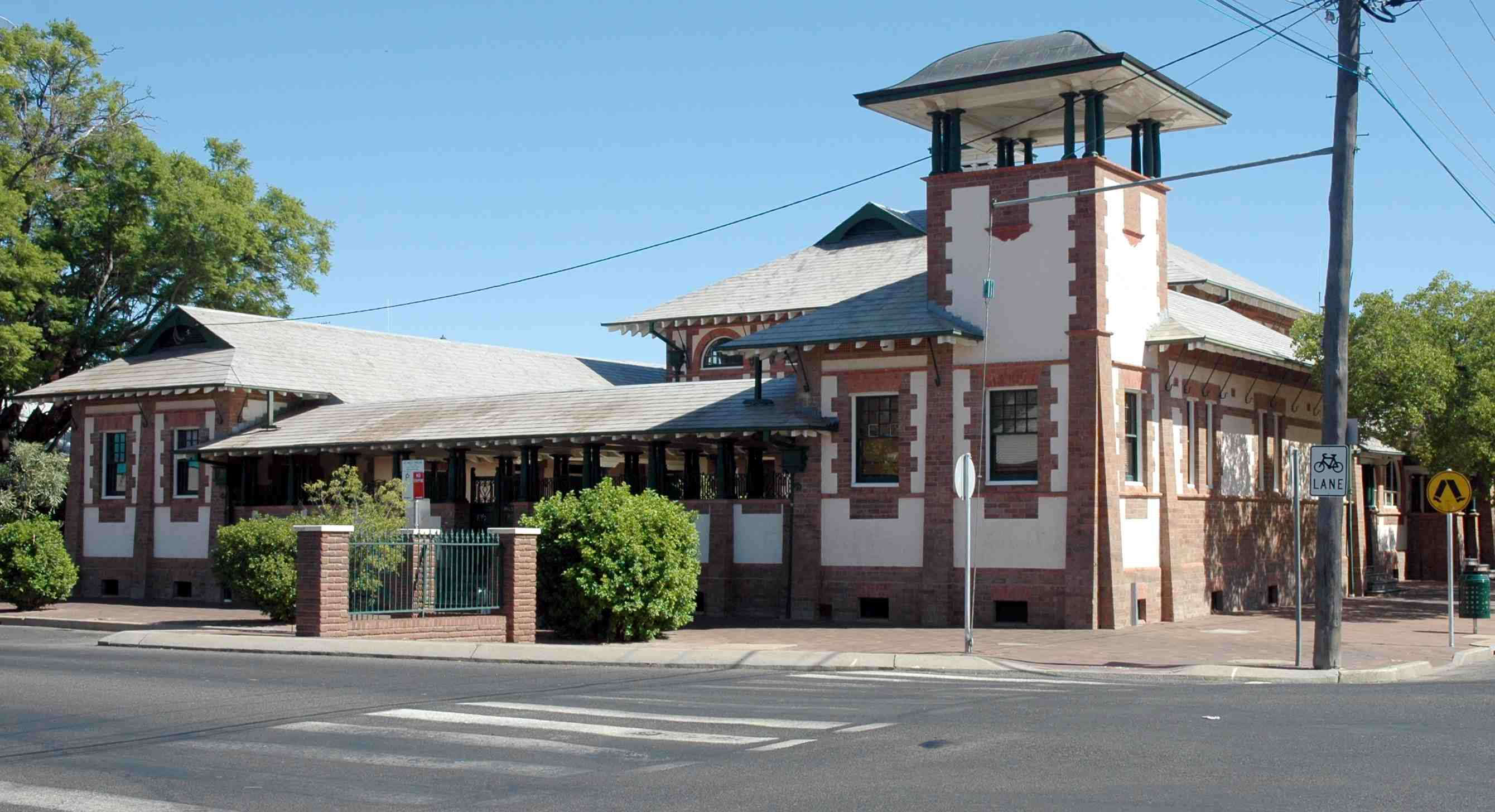

- Location within New South Wales Location within Australia
- 30.0897°S 145.9372°E
- Location: Richard Street, Bourke, Bourke Shire, New South Wales, Australia

Site notes
- Architect: George Oakeshott (attributed)
- Owner: Department of Justice

New South Wales Heritage Register
- Official name: Bourke Court House; Courthouse
- Type: state heritage (built)
- Designated: 2 April 1999
- Reference no.: 791
- Type: Courthouse
- Category: Law Enforcement
- Builders: J Douglas

Bourke Court House is a heritage-listed courthouse at Richard Street, Bourke, in the Orana region of New South Wales, Australia. The building's design was attributed to George Oakeshott, an employee of New South Wales Government Architect Walter Liberty Vernon and was built by J. Douglas of Orange. The property is owned by the New South Wales Department of Justice. It was added to the New South Wales State Heritage Register on 2 April 1999.

== History ==
The present-day Bourke Court House is the third in the town. It was constructed during the period 1897-1900 and cost 9,596 pounds. Major restoration work undertaken in 1968.

In June 2009, the Bourke Shire Council expressed outrage over not being informed of alterations to the building which had removed 109-year-old cedar benches to create two interview rooms. Restoration and replacement of courtroom bench seating took place in 2010.

== Description ==
The Bourke Court House is an impressive public building designed in the Federation Free style which has been adapted to suit the climate of Bourke. The building is a complex composition of several pavilions of various scales and forms and expresses the freedom of this style. The covered open walkways and enclosed garden court are designed to suit the hot dry climate. The central Court Room dominates the complex, the corner location is emphasised with a turret.

The Bourke Court House is constructed in rough cast rendered brick and face brick. The hipped roofs are clad in slate tiles.

== Heritage listing ==
The Bourke Court House is an outstanding example of a Federation free style public building within Australia. It is a significant historic townscape element within Bourke. The building has a lengthy association with the provision of justice in the district.

Bourke Court House was listed on the New South Wales State Heritage Register on 2 April 1999.
