= Ray Birks =

Australian rugby league footballer

Personal information
- Full name: Raymond James Birks
- Born: 1930 Sydney, New South Wales, Australia
- Died: 19 April 2008 (aged 77–78) Gymea, New South Wales

Playing information
- Position: Second-row
Club
Years	Team	Pld	T	G	FG	P
1953–58	St. George	10	0	0	0	0

Raymond James 'Ray' Birks (1930–2008) was an Australian rugby league footballer who played in the 1950s.

Originally from the Sutherland Junior Rugby League Club Birks was a tough Second Row forward at the St. George club that played predominately in Reserve Grade throughout his career (1952–58) although he featured in 6 first grade games between 1953 and 1955.

Birks died on 19 April 2008, age 78.
