= Berkshire (soil) =

Type of soil

Berkshire soil series is the name given to a well-drained loam or sandy loam soil which has developed on glacial till in parts of southern Quebec, eastern New York State and New England south to Massachusetts. It belongs to the podzol soil group and is one of the most important soils in its area of occurrence, supporting extensive forests and a fair number of farms. Many Berkshire soils lack the eluvial (E) horizon characteristic of podzols because they have a history of being cleared for cultivation.

== Geology ==
The deep glacial till which provides the foundation of the Berkshire series contains material derived from mica schist with fragments of gneiss, granite and phyllite also present in some areas. These rocks are not high in mineral nutrients but provide enough fine-grained material to produce a loamy soil.

== Agriculture ==
Cleared areas of the Berkshire series support a livestock industry with an emphasis on dairying. Grasses, legumes and silage corn are raised for cattle food. These crops are likely to need lime and fertilizer for optimum growth. Potatoes are also grown; they are well adapted to the Berkshire's natural acidity. Many Berkshire soils, however, are too rough and stony for easy cultivation and have been allowed to revert to forest.

== Forestry ==
Most of the Berkshire series supports mixed forest. Several species of maple, birch and pine are prominent among the trees, along with beech, spruce, fir, ash and basswood.
