= Burke Ministry =

Burke Ministry can refer to one of two Ministries of sub-national governments in Australia:

- Burke Ministry (Western Australia), led by Labor Premier Brian Burke in Western Australia from 25 February 1983 until 25 February 1988
- Burke Ministry (Northern Territory), led by Country Liberal Chief Minister Denis Burke in the Northern Territory from 9 February 1999 until 26 August 2001
