= Burke's Law =

Burke's Law may refer to:

- Burke's Law (1963 TV series), a 1963–1966 ABC drama (in its final season known as Amos Burke Secret Agent)
- Burke's Law (1994 TV series), a 1994–1995 CBS drama which is a revival of the 1963 series
