= Kim Birke =

German handball player (born 1987)

Personal information
- Full name: Kim Karina Birke
- Nationality: German
- Born: 29 December 1987 (age 38) Hanover, Germany
- Height: 1.72 m (5 ft 8 in)

Sport
- Sport: Handball
- Position: Left wing
- Current club: VfL Oldenburg
- Number: 5

Youth career
- Years: Team
- –2005: VfL Oldenburg

Senior clubs
- Years: Team
- 2005–2018: VfL Oldenburg
- 2022–2023: VfL Oldenburg
National team
| Years | Team | Apps | (Gls) |
| 2012–2018 | Germany | 6 | (8) |

Kim Karina Birke (born 29 December 1987) is a German former handball player who played her entire career for VfL Oldenburg. She also featured in the German national team. With Oldenburg she won the 2009, 2012 and 2018 DHB-Pokal as well as the 2009 DHB Supercup.

She retired after the 2018-19 season, but made a comeback for the team, when both left wings, Jane Martens and Lana Teiken were out with injuries.
