= Weihe (Werra) =

River in Germany

Location
- Country: Germany
- States: Hesse and Thuringia

Physical characteristics
- Source
  - coordinates: 50°59′27″N 9°57′01″E
- Mouth
  - location: Werra
  - coordinates: 50.9561°N 10.0697°E
- Length: 11.5 km (7.1 mi)

Basin features
- Progression: Werra→ Weser→ North Sea

The Weihe (German pronunciation: [ˈvaɪə]) river is an 11.5 km long western tributary of the Werra River in the Hersfeld-Rotenburg district in Hesse and the Wartburg district in Thuringia, Germany. It flows into the Werra in Gerstungen.

The Weihe has a catchment area of about 64 km², of which about 60% is accounted for by the Suhl; its discharge is 344 L/s.

== Course ==
The Weihe begins in the Richelsdorfer Mountains. Its source lies east of the village of Bauhaus on the eastern face of the Bauhäuser Höhe (416.3 m above sea level).

Initially, the Weihe flows east-southeast through the village of Süß, after which it runs through the Richelsdorf Hills and into the village of Richelsdorf. The course of the river then turns toward the Hessian-Thuringian border. After crossing into Thuringia and passing under the Weihetal Bridge and the Thuringian Railway, the Weihe flows through Untersuhl and shortly thereafter meets with the Suhl coming from the west.

The Weihe then bends to the north-northeast, where it flows into the Werra coming from the south. This meeting is 800 m after it flows under the Gerstungen-Vacha railroad line, which branches from the aforementioned Thuringian Railway.

== See also ==
- List of rivers of Hesse
- List of rivers of Thuringia
