= List of Sofia the First characters =

This is a list of the characters featured in the Disney Jr. animated series, Sofia the First and Sofia the First: Royal Magic.

== Main ==
- Princess Sofia Balthazar-Winslow I née Cordova (voiced by Ariel Winter) is an 8-year-old girl. A kind and adventurous village girl who becomes a princess after her mother, Miranda, marries King Roland II. Sofia is a mix of ethnic nationalities: Galdiz, Miranda's homeland, and Freezenburg, the homeland of her deceased biological father Birk Balthazar. After becoming part of the royal family, she becomes the current bearer of the mystical Amulet of Avalor, which Roland made her promise never to take off. It grants her various magical abilities, namely the ability to understand and transform into animals. The Amulet is later revealed to have been the refuge of another princess for 41 years, whom Sofia would eventually release. It can also summon Disney Princesses to help her, with Sofia eventually helping other princesses in need. In the fourth season, after defeating Prisma, Sofia becomes the first non-magical being to join the ranks of the Protectors and, under Chrysta's mentorship, trains to become a Protector, gaining items to aid her such as the Enchantlet and Necessi-Key. After Prisma escapes and allies with Twitch, who stole the Necessi-Key to help her escape, and Wormwood, Sofia must stop her from gaining power through the "Wicked Nine", a group of evil objects that belonged to nine major Disney villains (The Evil Queen from Snow White and the Seven Dwarfs, Lady Tremaine from Cinderella, Maleficent from Sleeping Beauty, Ursula from The Little Mermaid, Jafar from Aladdin, Shan Yu from Mulan, Dr. Facilier from The Princess and the Frog, Mother Gothel from Tangled, and Mor'du from Brave). In "Forever Royal", Sofia is promoted to a full-fledged Protector of the Ever Realm and Storykeeper of the Secret Library. Sofia appears as a teenager in the series finale of Elena of Avalor.
- Princess Amber Winslow (voiced by Darcy Rose Byrnes) is Sofia's older stepsister and James' twin sister. She is initially vain, spoiled, and impatient, but over the course of the series Sofia helps her become a better person and friend and she develops a love of astronomy and adventure. Honoring her title as princess, she devotes her life to jewelry and keeping everything clean. Sometimes, she is very paranoid and screams in a loud high voice. She is the oldest sibling and becomes queen of the Island of the Rompkins in The Mystic Isles and is named the heir to the throne of Enchancia in "A Royal Wedding". Amber appears as a fairy in "Butterfly Princess", as a mermaid in "Enchanted Feast", and as a teenager in the series finale of Elena of Avalor.
- Prince James Winslow (voiced by Zach Callison in seasons 1–2, Tyler Merna in seasons 2–3, Nicolas Cantu in seasons 3–4, Yonas Kibreab in Royal Magic) is Sofia's older stepbrother and Amber's twin brother, as well as Roland's son and Miranda's stepson, who aspires to be a knight when he grows up. Unlike Amber, he is adventurous, playful and outgoing, like Sofia. James appears as a teenager in the series finale of Elena of Avalor.
- Queen Miranda Balthazar-Winslow of Enchancia née Cordova (voiced by Sara Ramirez) – Born Miranda Cordova, she is Sofia's mother, is Roland's current wife, and the stepmother of the royal twins. She is a loving mother who loves her daughter and stepchildren, helps Sofia with her problems, and loves Roland for the man he is. She was a widowed cobbler until she married King Roland and she and Sofia joined the royal family.
- King Roland Winslow II of Enchancia (voiced by Travis Willingham) – Born Roland Winslow, he is Sofia's stepfather, Miranda's husband, the father of the royal twins, and the ruler of Enchancia. His previous wife and queen, Lorelei, died shortly after giving birth to Amber and James, leaving Roland a widower until he married Miranda and she and Sofia joined the royal family.
- Cedric (voiced by Jess Harnell) is the royal sorcerer of Enchancia, who the Good Fairies consider to be a great sorcerer. He is the son of the previous royal sorcerer, Goodwyn the Great, who has since retired along with Cedric's mother, Winnifred the Wise. He has a sister, Cordelia, whom he has never forgiven for stealing from him, but he later reconciles with her. He also has a niece, Calista, who adores him. Initially, he secretly plots to take over Enchancia to bring glory to sorcerers and prove himself as someone of worth, unsuccessfully attempting to steal the Amulet to use its power for himself. When he does steal it, it curses him for his selfish intentions to use its power, causing him to only be able to use it to help others. Cedric's treachery is later exposed and he admits that the royal family has not thanked him for his services, but King Roland gives him a second chance after he repents for his actions and helps save Sofia and Enchancia from Grimtrix. In the fourth season, Wormwood betrays him and becomes an ally to Prisma to help her and Twitch obtain the "Wicked Nine". Cedric fights him for a crown that he stole from the museum, causing King Roland to believe that he wants the crown for himself. After Wormwood delivers the crown to Prisma, Cedric, along with Roland, aids Sofia in attempting to reclaim the crown from her, during which he saves her from a fissure. Afterwards, he and Roland make amends, with Roland thanking Cedric for saving Sofia and apologizing for accusing him of returning to evil. After he frees Sofia from the Amulet, King Roland grants him the title of "Cedric the Great".
- Baileywick (voiced by Tim Gunn) is the castle steward, who strives to do his job well, but can be overprotective of Sofia. He has an older brother, Nigel.
- Clover (voiced by Wayne Brady) is a rabbit and friend of Robin and Mia, whose gluttony sometimes interferes with Sofia's royal duties.
- Robin (voiced by Meghan Strange) is a robin and friend of Clover, who is close to Mia.
- Mia (voiced by Ashley Eckstein) is a bluebird and friend of Clover, who is close to Robin.

== Disney Princesses ==
One of the powers of the amulet of avalor is ability to summon Disney princesses when Sophia requires assistance. ten Disney princesses have been summoned by the emilet of avalor.

- Cinderella from Cinderella (voiced by Jennifer Hale) helps Sofia make amends with Amber and become true sisters. She sings the song "True Sisters".
- Jasmine from Aladdin (speaking voice by Linda Larkin and singing voice provided by Lea Salonga) teaches Sofia and Amber how to tame a wild carpet and to not be afraid of trying new things. She sings the song "The Ride of Our Lives".
- Belle from Beauty and the Beast (voiced by Julie Nathanson) helps Sofia realize that actions speak louder than words. She sings the song "Make It Right".
- Ariel from The Little Mermaid (voiced by Jodi Benson) encourages her new friend Sofia to enlist Cora to help rescue Oona, teaching her that the love of family is held by all. They both sing the song "The Love We Share".
- Aurora from Sleeping Beauty (voiced by Kate Higgins) teaches Sofia that, in a crisis, she can count on her animal friends.
- Snow White from Snow White and the Seven Dwarfs (voiced by Katherine Von Till) teaches Sofia the importance of trusting one's instincts after she suspects that a visiting sorceress is not who she claims to be.
- Mulan from Mulan (speaking voice by Ming-Na Wen and singing voice provided by Lea Salonga) teaches Sofia and her friends that they are stronger than they know. She sings the song "Stronger Than You Know".
- Rapunzel from Tangled (voiced by Mandy Moore) shows Sofia and Amber how their relationship has grown despite Amber's theft of the amulet, also teaching Amber how to break the curse of Princess Ivy and regain Sofia's trust. She sings the song "Dare to Risk It All".
- Tiana from The Princess and the Frog (voiced by Anika Noni Rose) teaches Sofia that the most important part of giving gifts is that they come from the heart. She sings the song "From the Heart".
- Merida from Brave (voiced by Ruth Connell) teaches Sofia confidence so she can save Minimus and Mazzimo and fulfill her task as the Storykeeper.

The spirits of all ten Princesses later make a non-speaking cameo on the series finale, to encourage Sofia one final time in her confrontation with Vor.

== Characters from other Disney properties ==
- Flora, Fauna, and Merryweather from Sleeping Beauty (voiced by Barbara Dirikson, Russi Taylor, and Tress MacNeille respectively) are the Good Fairies, who are the headmistresses of Royal Prep, the school that Sofia, Amber, James, and their royal friends attend.
- Olaf from Frozen (voiced by Josh Gad) is summoned by the Amulet after it is affected by Miss Nettle's Crazy Crystals.
- Merlin from The Sword in the Stone (voiced by Jeff Bennett) is a revered wizard who is referenced throughout the series, most often by Cedric, who admires him. He debuts when he invites Sofia and two of her friends to visit him at his home. However, Cedric's niece Calista takes Merlin's wand, which is eventually given to his enemy Morgana.
- Archimedes from The Sword in the Stone is Merlin's owl companion. He has a brief appearance in "The Mystic Isles: The Great Pretender".

== Recurring ==
=== Royal Prep Academy ===
==== Princesses ====
- Princess Hildegard (speaking voice by Coco Grayson and singing voice provided by Jenna Lea Rosen) is one of Amber's best friends and the princess of Freezenburg. Like Amber, she is snobbish and vain until she befriends Sofia. She has a pet mink named Lulu.
- Princess Clio (speaking voice by Harley Graham and singing voice provided by Jenna Lea Rosen) is one of Amber's best friends and the princess of Corinthia. She is ladylike, yet kinder than Amber and Hildegard.
- Princess Vivian (voiced by Sabrina Carpenter) is Sofia's friend, who is the music-loving princess of Zumaria. She is usually shy and kind, but she has a great talent for music.
- Princess Jun (voiced by Michaela Zee) is a princess from Wei-Ling who is Sofia's classmate and friend.
- Princess Kari (voiced by Kiara Muhammad) is a new princess who loves magic and is Sofia's friend.
- Princess Zooey (voiced by Fiona Bishop) is a new princess who loves adventure and is Amber and Sofia's friend.
- Princess Lakshmi (voiced by Shavanie Jayna)

==== Princes ====
- Prince Hugo (voiced by Colin Ford in 2013, Grayson Hunter from 2014 to 2015) is a prince who attends Royal Prep. He is initially a bully towards Sofia and James, but after learning the true reason for his personality, Sofia helps Hugo redeem himself and they become friends. He loves ice-dancing, but was afraid of his father's reaction that he kept it a secret until Sofia convinces him to trust his heart.
- Prince Axel (voiced by Colin Ford) is Prince Hugo's older brother, who has already graduated from Royal Prep. While his joking personality can annoy Hugo and sometimes hurt his feelings, he truly cares for him.
- Prince Zandar (voiced by Maxim Knight in Once Upon a Princess and "Just One of the Princes," Karan Brar in 2013, Cade Sutton in "A Tale of Two Teams," Nathaniel Semsen in "New Genie on the Block") is Prince James' best friend and the prince of Tangu.
- Prince Desmond (voiced by Maxim Knight and Joshua Carlon) He was a bit fearful, but he became brave, he is intelligent and always prepared for everything.

=== Charmswell School ===
==== Princesses ====
- Princess Camila (voiced by Aaliyah Magcasi)
- Princess Layla (voiced by Mela Pietropaolo)
- Princess Zaria (voiced by Eva Ariel Binder)

==== Princes ====
- Prince Zane (voiced by Kai Harris)
- Prince Devin (voiced by Matthew Lamb)

=== Kings and nobles ===
- Aunt Matilda "Tilly" (voiced by Bonnie Hunt) is King Roland II's sister, Queen Miranda's sister-in-law, James and Amber's paternal aunt, and Sofia's paternal step-aunt.
- King Habib and Queen Farnaz (voiced by Sean Schemmel and Nika Futterman)

=== Animals ===
- Minimus (voiced by Eric Stonestreet) is Sofia's flying horse.
- Wormwood (voiced by Jim Cummings) is Cedric's pet raven, who is rivals with Clover and later gains the ability to communicate with humans. Wormwood later betrays Cedric after Cedric redeems himself, missing the person that Cedric once was. Wormwood makes a deal with Prisma where Prisma would accept Wormwood as her ally if he gave her the crown. Despite Sofia, along with Cedric and Roland, attempting to reclaim the crown from Prisma, Prisma escapes with the crown, and Wormwood joins her and Twitch as a result of their deal. In the finale, Wormwood joins forces with Vor, an evil sorceress, and the two attempt to take over the kingdom.
- Rex (voiced by Jim Cummings) is a foxhound and James' dog.
- Whiskers (voiced by Nick Offerman) is a fox.
- Kai (voiced by Jesse L. Martin) is a giant panda that dances and sings.

=== Villagers ===
- Jade (voiced by Isabella Acres) is one of Sofia's best friends from the village.
- Tyler (voiced by Travis Bryant) is one of Sofia's friends from the village and the only village boy to attend Royal Prep Academy.
- Ruby Hanshaw (voiced by Fiona Bishop in Once Upon a Princess and Diamond White in the series) is one of Sofia's best friends from the village.
- Helen Hanshaw (voiced by Viola Davis and Dawnn Lewis) the leader of the Buttercup troop and Ruby's mother.

=== Merpeople ===
- Oona (voiced by Kiernan Shipka) is a mermaid from Merroway Cove who Sofia befriends.
- Cora (voiced by Sarah Mitchell) is Oona's older sister, who does not trust Sofia at first, but befriends her after helping her save Oona.
- Queen Emmaline (voiced by Jodi Benson) is the mermaid queen of Merroway Cove and Oona and Cora's mother, who hated humans for bringing darkness to the kingdom with their ships. When Sofia's family visits her at her Floating Palace and that Sofia is a human turned mermaid, Sofia tries to convince her that humans are kind, but her advisor Plank wants her to use her trident to sink the Floating Palace and drown the royal family in a storm. However, when Sofía saves her daughter's life and realizes that not all humans are bad. She became friends with the Enchancia royal family after getting to know them better. She is a loving mother who cares for her daughters and her kingdom, as well as a fair and strong ruler.
- Fluke (voiced by Gabe Eggerling) is a merboy from Merroway Cove who was boastful and jealous until an adventure with Sofia and Oona helps him change for the better.
- Shelly (voiced by Jenna Lea Rosen) is a tanned skinned mermaid with brown hair, a white top and a blue fin who loves to play the drums, she forms a band with Oona and Flip.
- Flip (voiced by Connor Wise) is a light-skinned merman with orange hair and a military green fin who loves to play the flute and forms a band with Oona and Shelly.
- Sven (voiced by John Ross Bowie) is a seahorse and friend of Oona.
- Slim (voiced by Sean Schemmel) is a pufferfish and friend of Fluke.

=== Magical persons ===
- Lucinda (voiced by Merit Leighton) is a witch with magic powers whom Sofia befriends.
- Lily (voiced by Brennley Brown) is a witch with magic powers whom Lucinda befriends.
- Indigo (voiced by Bailey Gambertoglio) is a witch with magic powers whom Lucinda befriends.
- Marla (voiced by Tracey Ullman and Laraine Newman) is a witch, Lucinda's mother.
- Calista (voiced by Kaite Zieff) She is Cedric's niece and Cordelia's daughter.
- Cordelia (voiced by Rachael MacFarlane) is Cedric's sister, is a talented sorceress.
- Morgana (voiced by Catherine O'Hara) is a witch self-centered and power-hungry witch, enemy of Merlin.
- Bash (voiced by Brian Cummings) is one of the henchmen of the witch Morgana.
- Kazeem (voiced by Connor Wise and Jadon Sand) is a young genius who works at the genius command.
- Sergeant Fizz (voiced by Keith Ferguson) is the head of the genius command.
- Book Narrator (voiced by Hugh Bonneville)
- Azurine (voiced by Rachael MacFarlane) is a crystal master, and sister of Prisma.

=== The Protectors ===
- The Protectors are a group of various magical beings from the Mystic Isles who serve to protect it. They use a magical tool called an Enchantlet.
  - Orion (voiced by Colin Salmon)
  - Vega (voiced by Ming-Na Wen)
  - Chrysta (voiced by Jurnee Smollett) is a fairy Protector and Sofia's trainer.
  - Skye (voiced by Andrew Rannells) is a flying unicorn and Sofia's steed in the Mystic isles.
  - Nerissa (voiced by Alyssa Rhoney) is a mermaid Protector sent to find and bring Ursula's necklace to the Mystic Isles.

== Villains ==
- Plank (voiced by Phil Morris) is Queen Emmaline's chief advisor, who got a scar on his left arm as a result of the previous encounter with humans. He demands that Queen Emmaline that she uses her trident against humans and their vessels.
- Miss Nettle (voiced by Megan Mullally and Anna Vocino) is a fairy who was once an apprentice of Flora, Fauna, and Merryweather, but later sought to surpass them. Like Cedric, she initially seeks to obtain the Amulet. Her ability of "enchanted horticulture" is revealed to have been the origin for breeding Freezenberg's "snowdrop" royal flower, and her antagonism is implied to be resentment over not receiving proper recognition for her efforts.
- Rosey (voiced by Pamela Adlon) is a magical talking rose and Miss Nettle's companion.
- Slickwell (voiced by Christian Borle) is a young steward who serves King Magnus and seeks to usurp Baileywick's position.
- Mamanu (voiced by Angelique Perrin) is an evil sorceress from the kingdom of Hakalo. She was previously banished by Hakalo's royalty and seeks revenge against them.
- Princess Ivy (voiced by Anna Camp) is a princess who first appears when Amber steals the Amulet and attempts to summon her own princess. After pretending to be her friend, Ivy takes over Enchancia and drains it of color to make it more like her former kingdom, where there was no color except for black, white, and gray. However, she is defeated and sent to a prison-type island. She later appears when the animals begin to fall into eternal sleep and can only be awoken with a special type of flower called Wake Upsy Daisies, which grow on a faraway island. After the Amulet sends Sofia to help a princess in distress, who turns out to be Ivy, she learns that the island is where the Wake Upsy Daisies grow. Since the Daisies are colorful, Ivy attempts to destroy them and her pet skunk, Roma, allies with Sofia to help stop her, during which Sofia learns that Miss Nettle tends to the garden and that she and Ivy are at odds. Most of the Daisies are destroyed when Whatnaught, Sofia's squirrel friend, and Roma fall into eternal sleep. Ivy redeems herself after Sofia helps her realize that she has love within her for Roma, helping Miss Nettle and Sofia restore the Daisies and awaken Whatnaught. Having helped Ivy find her "heart", the Amulet returns Sofia and Whatnaught to Enchancia, where the Daisies are used to awaken the animals.
- Glacia the Ice Witch (voiced by Phylicia Rashad) is a witch who lives on top of a mountain and gives magic to anyone who brings her a gift.
- Grimtrix the Good (voiced by Billy West) is the headmaster of Hexley Hall and a friend of Cedric. He masquerades as a benevolent sorcerer before his true intentions are exposed.
- Prisma (voiced by Megan Hilty) is an evil Crystal Master from the Mystic Isles and Azurine's sister. She manipulates Sofia and Amber into helping her before they eventually learn the truth and depower her using the Shattering Stone. While the Protectors arrest Prisma, she vows revenge on Sofia and later escapes with help from Twitch, who gives her Sofia's Necessi-Key. Along with Twitch and Wormwood, Prisma plans to gain power by obtaining the "Wicked Nine". Though she succeeds in this plan, Vor, who is freed from the Locket of Vor, possesses her and transforms her into Vor. After Vor's defeat, she and Sofia are sucked into the Amulet and she apologizes to her, having never intended for the Ever Realm and the Mystic Isles to fall into darkness. She is arrested after she and Sofia are freed from the Amulet through Cedric's magic spell and the combined efforts of the Protectors and Sofia's friends and family.
- Twitch (voiced by Jeff Bennett) is a Strangeling and ally of Prisma, who has the power to transform into any animal and helps her escape by stealing Sofia's Necessi-Key. He and Wormwood become rivals after he allies with Prisma.
- Vor (voiced by Paty Lombard) is an ancient enchantress who was previously defeated by the Protectors and imprisoned in the Locket of Vor. In the present day, after Prisma obtains the Locket, Vor manipulates her into obtaining the Wicked Nine to free her. After escaping, Vor possesses Prisma before being vanquished by Sofia.
