= Burk =

Burk may refer to:

== Places ==
- Burk, Bavaria, a municipality in the district of Ansbach, Bavaria, Germany
- Burk, a city district of Bautzen_(district), Saxony, Germany
- Burk, a neighborhood of Forchheim (Oberfranken), Bavaria, Germany

== People ==
- Burk (name), given name and surname

== Other uses ==
- Burk House (disambiguation)

== See also ==
- Burking, a particular form of smothering
- Burks (disambiguation)
- Burke (disambiguation)
- Burck
- Berk (disambiguation)
- de Burgh, a surname
- Birk (disambiguation)
- Bourke (disambiguation)
- Berg (disambiguation)
- Burgos, a city of northern Spain
- Burgh, an autonomous corporate entity in Scotland
