= Berk =

Berk may refer to:

- Berk (name), a surname, given name, or any of several people with that name
- Berk, Bolu, Turkey, a village
- Berk Trade and Business School, New York City
- Berk, a fictional island in the How to Train Your Dragon series of books and films
- Berk-i Satvet, a torpedo cruiser of the Ottoman Navy later renamed Berk
- Berk, rhyming slang often used to mean "foolish person"
- Berk., taxonomic author abbreviation of Miles Joseph Berkeley (1803–1889), English cryptogamist and founder of the science of plant pathology

== See also ==
- Berk–Tabatznik syndrome, a medical condition
- De Berk (disambiguation)
- Berks (disambiguation)
- Birk (disambiguation)
- Berkshire (disambiguation)
- Berkeley (disambiguation)
