= Dippach, Thuringia =

Dippach
- Ortsteil of Werra-Suhl-Tal
- Interactive map of Dippach
- Location within Germany Location within Thuringia
- Coordinates: 50°55′13″N 10°2′36″E
- Country: Germany
- State: Thuringia
- District: Wartburgkreis
- Town: Werra-Suhl-Tal

Area
  - Total: 6.09 km^{2} (2.35 sq mi)
- Elevation: 220 m (720 ft)

Population (2017-12-31)
  - Total: 1,071
  - Density: 176/km^{2} (455/sq mi)
- Time zone: UTC+01:00 (CET)
  - Summer (DST): UTC+02:00 (CEST)
- Postal codes: 99837
- Dialling codes: 036922
- Vehicle registration: WAK

Dippach (German pronunciation: [ˈdɪpax]) is a village and a former municipality in the Wartburgkreis district of Thuringia, Germany. Since 1 January 2019, it is part of the town Werra-Suhl-Tal.
