= Birks (surname) =

Birks is a surname. Notable people with the surname include:

- Anthony Birks (1941–2002), New Zealand Army officer, Chief of the General Staff and Chief of Defence Force
- Ashley Birks (born 1990), British speedway rider
- Charles Napier Birks (1844–1924), founder of South Australian department store Charles Birks & Co
- Cliff Birks (1910–1998), English football player
- Douglas Birks (1919–2004), English cricket player
- Frederick Birks (1894–1917), Australian recipient of the Victoria Cross
- George Vause Birks (c. 1815–1858), medical doctor, founder of influential family in South Australia
- Gerald Birks (1894–1991), Canadian fighter ace in World War I
- Graham Birks (born 1942), English football player
- Henry Birks (1840–1928), Canadian businessman, founder of the jewelry store, Birks & Mayors
- Horace Birks (1897–1985), British Army officer who served during both the World Wars
- Jānis Birks (born 1956), Latvian politician, Mayor of Riga 2007–09
- Jocelynn Birks (born 1993), American volleyball player
- John B. Birks (1920–1979), British physicist and namesake for the Birks' law
- Laurie Birks (born 1928, date of death unknown), Australian boxer
- Lawrence Birks (1874–1924), Australian electrical engineer in New Zealand
- Len Birks (1896–1975), English football player
- Malcolm Birks (born 1975), English cricket player
- Melville Birks (1876–1924), South Australian medical practitioner
- Peter Birks (1941–2004), British legal scholar
- Ray Birks (1930–2008), Australian rugby player
- Rosetta Jane Birks (1856–1911), Australian social reformer and philanthropist
- Thomas Rawson Birks (1810–1883), theologian and controversialist at Oxford
- Walter Richard Birks (1886–1960), Australian agricultural scientist and headmaster

== See also ==
- Birk (name)
- Birx (surname)
- Burks, surname
- Burkes, surname
