= Bourke Street Wesleyan Chapel =

Bourke Street Wesleyan Chapel (former)
- Wesley Edward Eagar Centre
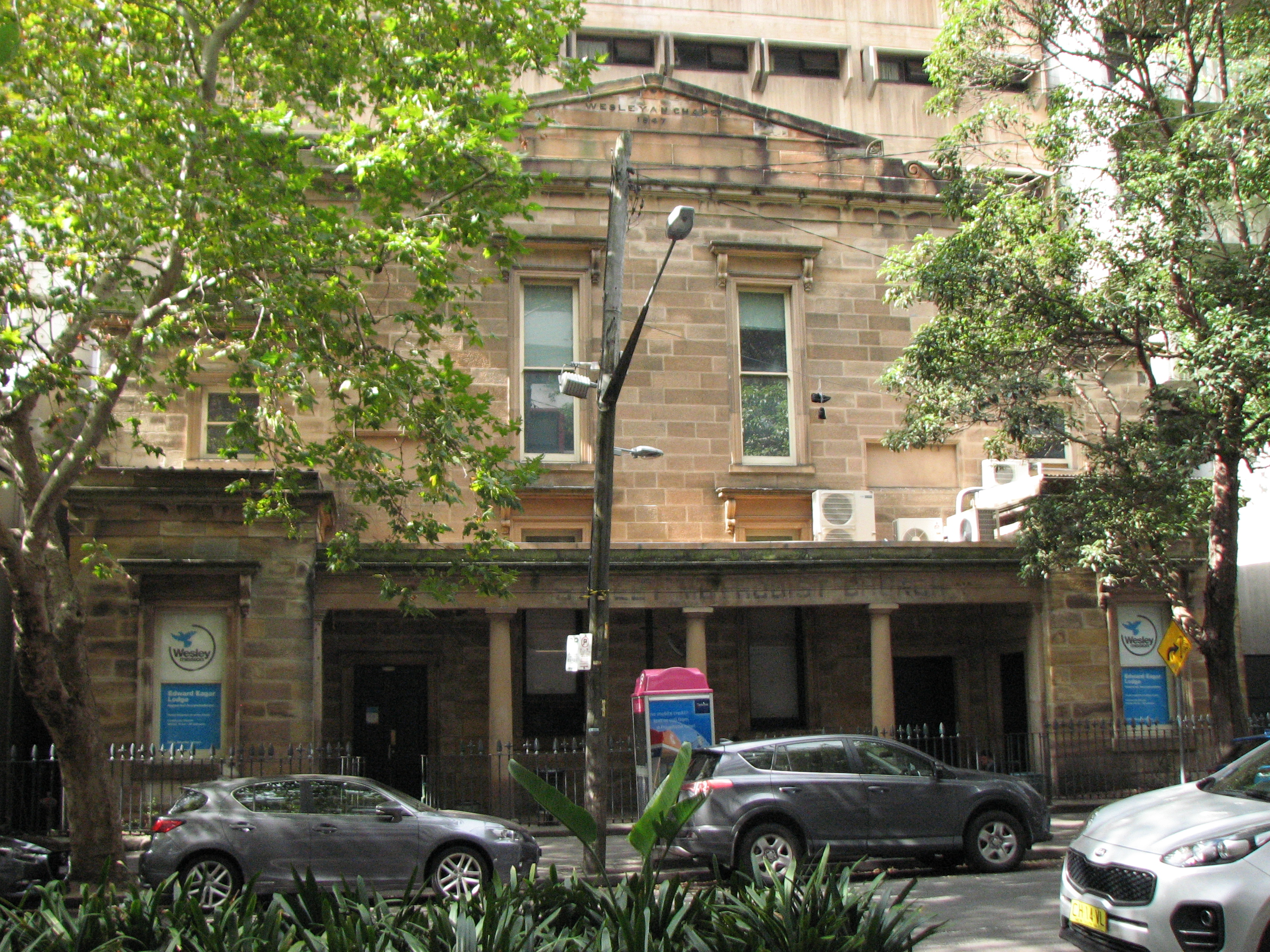
- The former chapel, now homeless shelter, in Surry Hills

- Location within Sydney Location within Australia
- Interactive map of Bourke Street Wesleyan Chapel (former)
- 33.8828°S 151.2165°E
- Location: 348a Bourke Street, Surry Hills, City of Sydney, New South Wales, Australia

Site notes
- Owner: Wesley Mission

New South Wales Heritage Register
- Official name: Wesleyan Chapel (former)
- Type: State heritage (built)
- Designated: 2 April 1999
- Reference no.: 457
- Type: Chapel
- Category: Religion

The Bourke Street Wesleyan Chapel is a heritage-listed former chapel, previously known as the Bourke Street Methodist Church, and now homeless centre called the Wesley Edward Eagar Centre, located at 348a Bourke Street in the inner city Sydney suburb of Surry Hills, New South Wales, Australia. The property is owned by the Wesleyan Methodist Church of Australia and operated by Wesley Mission, a social service organisation. The former chapel was added to the New South Wales State Heritage Register on 2 April 1999.

== History ==
The sandstone chapel was built in 1847.

An eight-storey residential building was built behind the original facade and hall in the 1970s, and reopened as the Edward Eagar Lodge homelessness centre in 1979.

== See also ==
- Homelessness in Australia
- Wesleyan Methodist Church of Australia
