= Stephen Burks (economist) =

American economist

Stephen V. Burks is professor emeritus of economics and management at the University of Minnesota Morris. He is an expert in the labor market economics of the trucking industry in the United States and is a former truck driver. Burks was chairperson of the standing Technical Committee on Trucking Industry Research at the Transportation Research Board, part of the National Academy of Sciences, from 2014 to 2017. He received his BA from Reed College in 1974, MAs from Indiana University Bloomington in 1979 and the University of Massachusetts Amherst in 1993, and his PhD from the University of Massachusetts Amherst (1999).
