= Berka/Werra =

- Ortsteil of Werra-Suhl-Tal
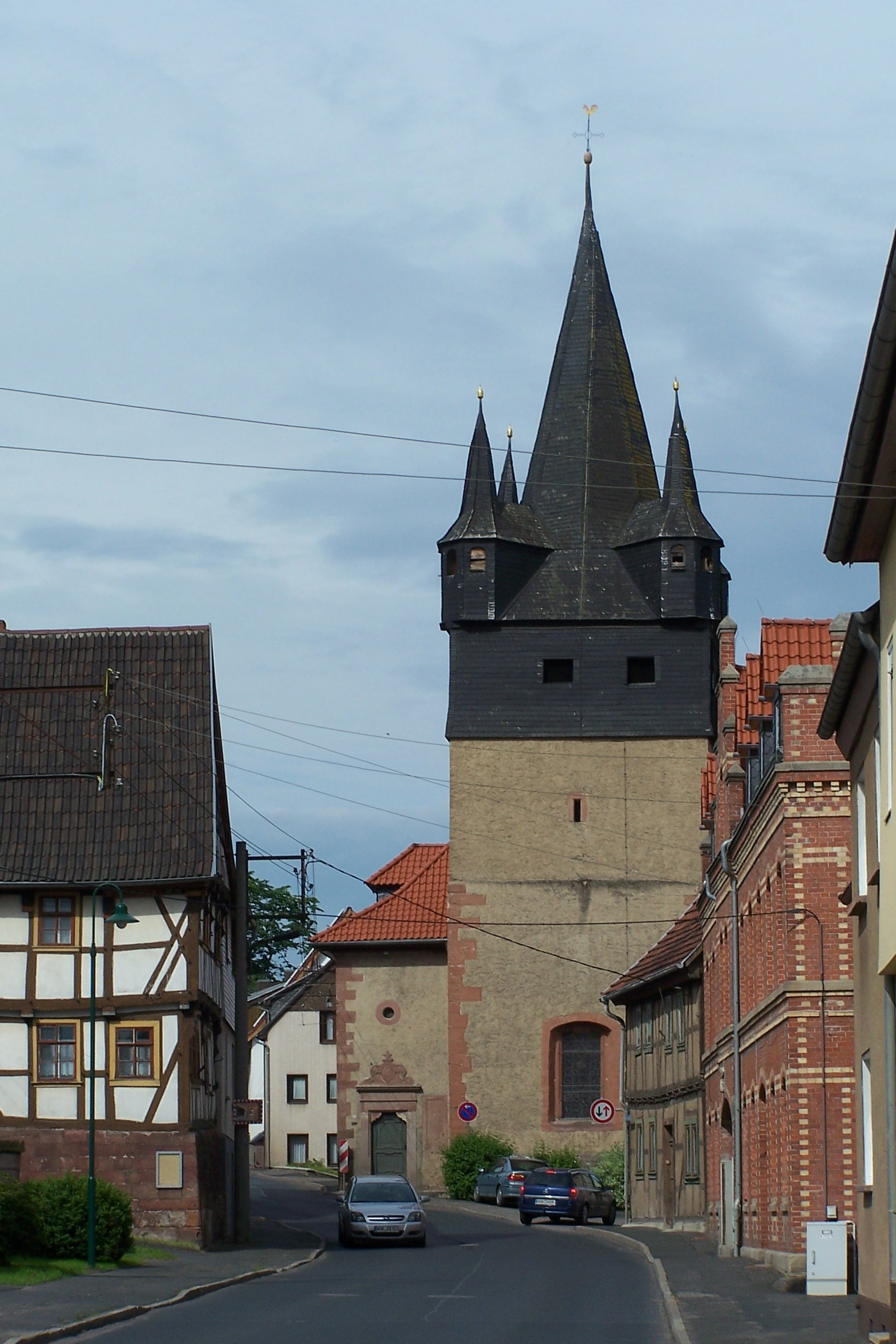

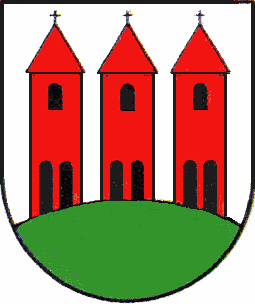
- Coat of arms
- Interactive map of Berka/Werra
- Location within Germany Location within Thuringia
- Coordinates: 50°56′22″N 10°4′12″E
- Country: Germany
- State: Thuringia
- District: Wartburgkreis
- Town: Werra-Suhl-Tal

Area
  - Total: 57.09 km^{2} (22.04 sq mi)
- Elevation: 193 m (633 ft)

Population (2017-12-31)
  - Total: 4,231
  - Density: 74.11/km^{2} (191.9/sq mi)
- Time zone: UTC+01:00 (CET)
  - Summer (DST): UTC+02:00 (CEST)
- Postal codes: 99837
- Dialling codes: 036922
- Vehicle registration: WAK

Berka/Werra (German pronunciation: [ˈbɛʁka]; also Berka an der Werra) is a town and a former municipality in the Wartburgkreis district, in Thuringia, in central Germany. Since 1 January 2019, it is part of the town Werra-Suhl-Tal. It is situated on the river Werra, 19 km west of Eisenach.

Within the former municipality there are the following municipal districts:

- Berka/Werra city center
- Fernbreitenbach
- Gospenroda
- Herda (with Hausbreitenbach and Kratzeroda)
- Horschlitt (with Auenheim-Rienau)
- Vitzeroda (with Abteroda and Gasteroda)
- Wünschensuhl

== History ==
Within the German Empire (1871-1918), Berka/Werra was part of the Grand Duchy of Saxe-Weimar-Eisenach.

During World War II, Abteroda was the location of two subcamps of the Buchenwald concentration camp, in which 230 men, mostly French and Russians, and 375 French, Polish, Soviet, Italian, Serbian, Croatian and Greek women were imprisoned. In April 1945, surviving prisoners were sent on a death march to the Buchenwald concentration camp.
