= List of participants in the Merz cabinet coalition negotiations =

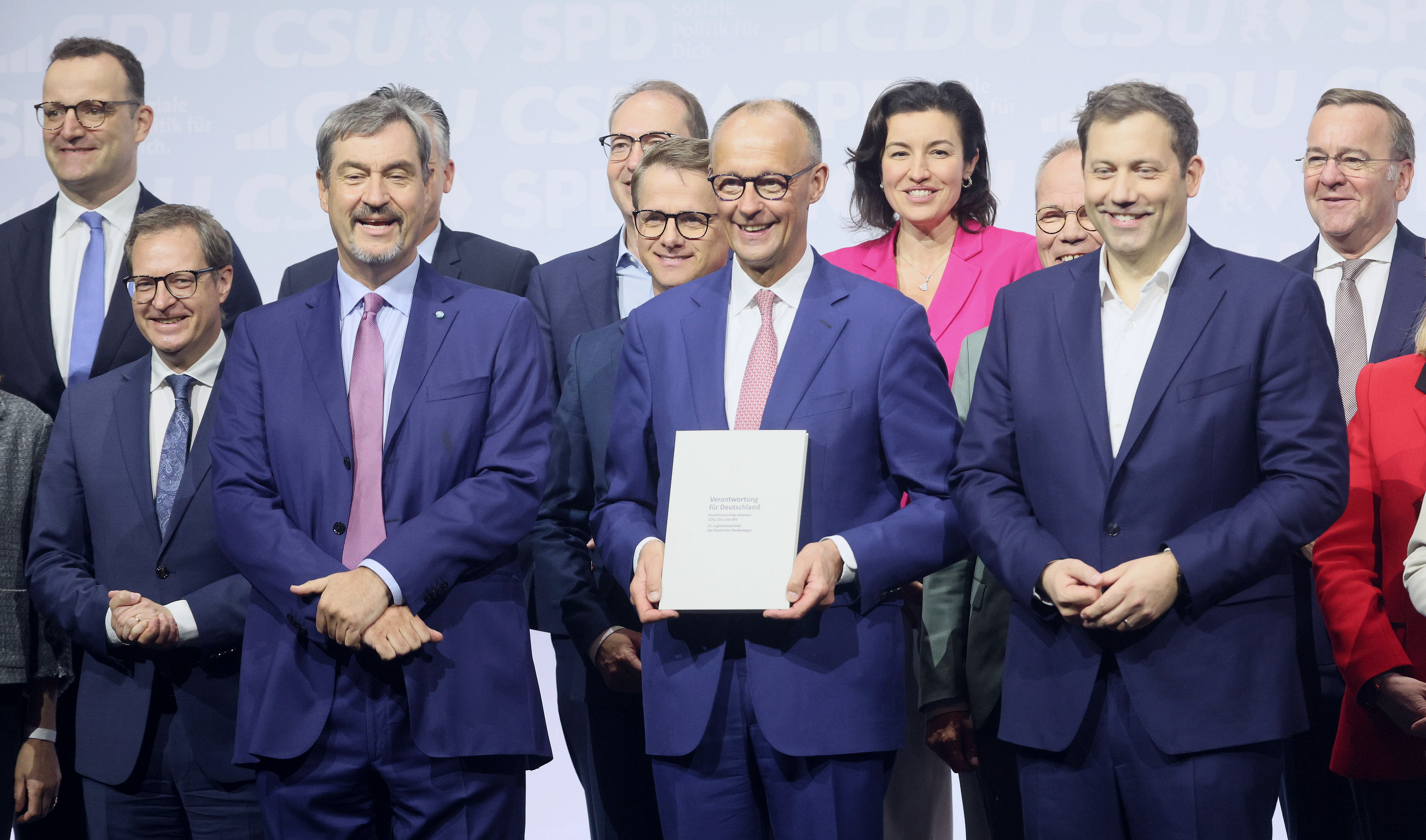
Signing of the coalition agreement for the 21st legislative period of the German Bundestag on 5 May 2025 in Berlin.

The list of participants in the coalition negotiations between CDU/CSU and SPD in 2025 lists the people who participated in the coalition negotiations between the parties after the 2025 German federal election.

Negotiations to form a coalition began on 13 March 2025, and were successfully concluded on 9 April 2025.

The outcome of the coalition negotiations led to the formation of the Merz cabinet.

== Round of party executives ==
=== CDU/CSU ===
- Friedrich Merz, CDU Federal Chairman
- Markus Söder, CSU chairman and Minister-President of Bavaria
- Thorsten Frei, First Parliamentary Secretary of the CDU/CSU parliamentary group in the Bundestag
- Alexander Dobrindt, Chairman of the CSU parliamentary group in the German Bundestag

=== SPD ===
- Lars Klingbeil, SPD Chairman
- Saskia Esken, SPD Chairwoman
- Matthias Miersch, acting SPD General Secretary

== Negotiating group ==
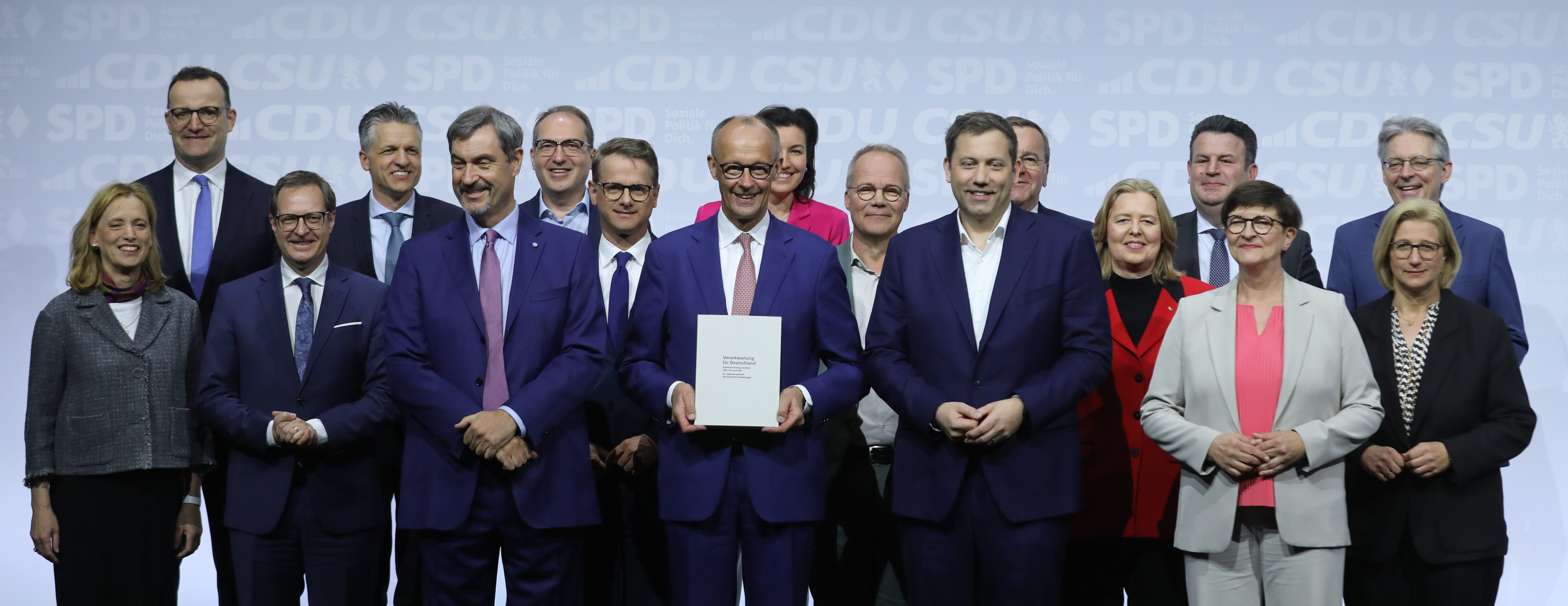
The majority of the negotiating team at the signing of the coalition agreement for the 21st legislative period of the Bundestag.

=== CDU/CSU ===
- Friedrich Merz, CDU Federal Chairman
- Karin Prien, Deputy Federal Chairwoman of the CDU
- Carsten Linnemann, CDU General Secretary
- Michael Kretschmer, Deputy Federal Chairman of the CDU
- Jens Spahn, Deputy Federal Chairman of the CDU
- Martin Huber, CSU General Secretary
- Markus Söder, CSU chairman and Minister-President of Bavaria
- Thorsten Frei, First Parliamentary Secretary of the CDU/CSU parliamentary group in the Bundestag
- Dorothee Bär, Deputy Chairwoman of the CSU
- Alexander Dobrindt, Chair of the CSU state group in the Bundestag

=== SPD ===
- Lars Klingbeil, SPD Chairman
- Saskia Esken, SPD Chairwoman
- Manuela Schwesig, Minister-President of Mecklenburg-Western Pomerania
- Achim Post, Deputy Federal Chairman of the SPD
- Matthias Miersch, acting SPD General Secretary
- Bärbel Bas, former President of the Bundestag
- Hubertus Heil, Deputy Federal Chairman of the SPD
- Boris Pistorius, Federal Minister of Defence
- Anke Rehlinger, Deputy Chairwoman of the SPD

== Steering Group ==
=== CDU/CSU ===
- Carsten Linnemann, CDU General Secretary
- Martin Huber, CSU General Secretary
- Thorsten Frei, First Parliamentary Secretary of the CDU/CSU parliamentary group in the Bundestag
- Alexander Dobrindt, Chairman of the CSU parliamentary group in the German Bundestag

=== SPD ===
- Matthias Miersch, acting SPD General Secretary
- Carsten Schneider

== Working groups ==
Sixteen working groups will be formed, each with 16 participants. The respective offices refer to the time of the negotiations, whereby for federal politicians, previous offices refer to the outgoing 20th legislative period and subsequent offices denote immediately following positions in the 21st legislative period. The designations MdB, MdL, MdA, MdHB, MdBB and MdEP indicate membership in the respective parliaments

=== Interior, Law, Migration and Integration ===
Role	CDU	CSU	SPD
Chief negotiator	Günter Krings MdB, legal policy spokesperson	Andrea Lindholz MdB, previously Deputy Parliamentary Group Leader, subsequently Vice President of the German Bundestag	Dirk Wiese MdB, Previously Deputy Parliamentary Group Leader, subsequently First Parliamentary Secretary
Other members	Sebastian Lechner MdL, Chairman of the CDU Lower Saxony	Silke Launert MdB, Previously Chair of the Committee on the European Union, subsequently State Secretary in the Ministry of Research	Reem Alabali-Radovan MdB, previously Federal Government Commissioner for Migration, subsequently Federal Minister for Economic Cooperation and Development
Other members	Roman Poseck, Hessian Interior Minister	Joachim Herrmann MdL, Bavarian Interior Minister	Daniela Behrens, Lower Saxony's Interior Minister
Other members	Armin Schuster, Saxony's Interior Minister		Johannes Fechner MdB, Parliamentary Managing Director
Other members	Alexander Throm MdB, domestic policy spokesperson		Andy Grote MdHB, Hamburg's Senator of the Interior
Other members	Nina Warken MdB, previously Parliamentary Managing Director, subsequently Federal Minister of Health		Ralf Stegner MdB, former Minister of the Interior of Schleswig-Holstein
Other members			Carmen Wegge MdB, legal policy spokesperson

=== Economy, industry, tourism ===
Role	CDU	CSU	SPD
Chief negotiator	Jens Spahn MdB, previously deputy parliamentary group leader, subsequently parliamentary group leader	Hansjörg Durz MdB	Alexander Schweitzer MdL, Minister-President of Rhineland-Palatinate
Other members	Colette Boos-John, Minister of Economic Affairs in Thuringia	Alois Rainer MdB, Previously Chairman of the Finance Committee, subsequently Federal Minister of Agriculture	Verena Hubertz MdB, previously Deputy Parliamentary Group Leader, subsequently Federal Minister for Construction
Other members	Jens Giesecke MdEP	Michaela Kaniber MdL, Bavarian Minister of Agriculture	Franziska Giffey MdA, Berlin Senator for Economic Affairs
Other members	Julia Klöckner MdB, Previously economic policy spokesperson, subsequently President of the Bundestag		Kaweh Mansoori, Hessian Minister of Economic Affairs
Other members	Christian Freiherr von Stetten MdB, Spokesperson for small and medium-sized enterprises		Sarah Philipp MdL, Co-Vorsitz SPD Nordrhein-Westfalen
Other members	Stephan Toscani MdL, Chairman of the CDU Saarland		Sebastian Roloff MdB
Other members			Manja Schüle, Brandenburg Minister of Science

=== Digital ===
Role	CDU	CSU	SPD
Chief negotiator	Manuel Hagel MdL, Chairman of the CDU Baden-Württemberg	Reinhard Brandl MdB, Previously digital politics spokesperson, subsequently parliamentary managing director of the CSU state group	Armand Zorn MdB, Previously deputy spokesperson for financial policy, subsequently deputy parliamentary group leader
Other members	Ronja Kemmer MdB	Jonas Geissler MdB	Christian Pegel, Head of the State Chancellery of Mecklenburg-Vorpommern
Other members	Catarina dos Santos-Wintz MdB	Judith Gerlach MdL, Bavarian Health Minister	Metin Hakverdi MdB
Other members	Nadine Schön MdB until 2025		Ronja Endres, Co-chair of the SPD Bavaria
Other members	Dirk Schrödter, Head of the State Chancellery of Schleswig-Holstein		Fedor Rose, Head of the State Chancellery of Rhineland-Palatinate
Other members	Kristina Sinemus, Hessian Minister for Digital Affairs		Carolin Wagner MdB
Other members			Tiemo Wölken MdEP

=== Transport and infrastructure, construction and housing ===
Role	CDU	CSU	SPD
Chief negotiator	Ina Scharrenbach MdL, Minister for Construction North Rhine-Westphalia	Ulrich Lange MdB, subsequently State Secretary Ministry of Transport	Klara Geywitz MdB (Head of Construction), ormer Federal Minister for Construction
Chief negotiator	Ina Scharrenbach MdL, Minister for Construction North Rhine-Westphalia	Ulrich Lange MdB, subsequently State Secretary Ministry of Transport	Sören Bartol MdB (Head of Transport), former State Secretary, Ministry of Construction and Transport
Other members	Thomas Bareiß MdB	Michael Kießling MdB	Sabine Bätzing-Lichtenthäler MdL, Chairwoman of the SPD Rhineland-Palatinate
Other members	Jan-Marco Luczak MdB, previous spokesperson for construction policy	Christian Bernreiter MdL, Bavarian Minister of Construction	Isabel Cademartori MdB, previous transport policy spokesperson
Other members	Christoph Ploß MdB		Elisabeth Kaiser MdB, previously State Secretary in the Ministry of Construction, subsequently Commissioner for Eastern Germany
Other members	Patrick Schnieder MdB, subsequently Minister of Transport		Karen Pein, Hamburg Senator for Urban Development
Other members	Felix Schreiner MdB		Philipp Türmer Juso chairman

=== Work and Social Affairs ===
Role	CDU	CSU	SPD
Chief negotiator	Carsten Linnemann MdB, General Secretary of the CDU	Stephan Stracke MdB	Katja Mast MdB, Previously First Parliamentary Secretary, subsequently State Secretary at the Ministry of Labour
Other members	Marc Biadacz MdB	Peter Aumer MdB	Dagmar Schmidt MdB
Other members	Ines Claus MdL, CDU parliamentary group leader in Hesse	Ulrike Scharf MdL, Bavarian Minister of Social Affairs	Kerstin Griese MdB, State Secretary, Ministry of Labour
Other members	Gitta Connemann MdB, subsequently State Secretary, Ministry of Economic Affairs		Cansel Kiziltepe MdA, Berlin Senator for Labour
Other members	Stefan Nacke MdB		Annika Klose MdB
Other members	Dennis Radtke MdEP, CDA Federal Chairman		Kathrin Michel MdB
Other members			Natalie Pawlik MdB, Previously Commissioner for Resettlement Issues, subsequently Commissioner for Migration

=== Health and Care ===
Role	CDU	CSU	SPD
Chief negotiator	Karl-Josef Laumann MdL, Health Minister of North Rhine-Westphalia	Stephan Pilsinger MdB	Katja Pähle MdL, Parliamentary group leader Saxony-Anhalt
Other members	Kerstin von der Decken, Minister of Justice of Schleswig-Holstein	Emmi Zeulner MdB	Karl Lauterbach MdB, former Federal Minister of Health
Other members	Albrecht Schütte MdL (Baden-Württemberg)	Klaus Holetschek MdL, Parliamentary group leader	Sabine Dittmar MdB, previously State Secretary, Ministry of Health
Other members	Tino Sorge MdB, Previously health policy spokesperson, subsequently State Secretary, Ministry of Health		Clemens Hoch, Minister of Health Rhineland-Palatinate
Other members	Diana Stolz, Hessian Minister of Health		Petra Köpping MdL, Saxony's Minister of Health
Other members	Hendrik Streeck MdB (since 2025), former member of the Corona Expert Council		Matthias Mieves MdB
Other members			Andreas Philippi, Lower Saxony's Minister of Health

=== Family, women, youth, senior citizens and democracy ===
Role	CDU	CSU	SPD
Chief negotiator	Silvia Breher MdB, Previously family policy spokesperson, subsequently State Secretary at the Ministry of Agriculture	Susanne Hierl MdB	Serpil Midyatli MdL, Chairwoman of the SPD Schleswig-Holstein
Other members	Helge Benda	Ralph Edelhäußer MdB	Wiebke Esdar MdB, Spokesperson for the Parlamentarische Linke
Other members	Conrad Clemens MdL, Saxony Minister of Education	Katrin Albsteiger, Mayor of Neu-Ulm	Felix Döring MdB
Other members	Katharina Günther-Wünsch MdA, Berlin Senator for Education		Josephine Ortleb MdB, previously Parliamentary Managing Director, subsequently Vice President of the Bundestag
Other members	Bettina Wiesmann MdB		Jochen Ott MdL, Parliamentary group leader North Rhine-Westphalia
Other members	Mareike Lotte Wulf MdB, subsequently State Secretary, Ministry for Families		Svenja Stadler MdB
Other members			Maja Wallstein MdB

=== Education, research and innovation ===
Role	CDU	CSU	SPD
Chief negotiator	Karin Prien, Previously Minister of Education of Schleswig-Holstein, subsequently Federal Minister of Education	Katrin Staffler MdB, Previously education policy spokesperson, subsequently commissioner for nursing care	Oliver Kaczmarek MdB, Previous education policy spokesperson
Other members	Sebastian Gemkow MdL, Saxony Minister of Science	Thomas Silberhorn MdB	Stefanie Hubig, Previously Minister of Education of Rhineland-Palatinate, subsequently Federal Minister of Justice
Other members	Thomas Jarzombek MdB, subsequently State Secretary, Ministry of Digitalization	Markus Blume MdL, Bavarian Minister of Science	Bettina Martin MdL, Minister of Science in Mecklenburg-Vorpommern
Other members	Gordon Schnieder MdL, Chairman of the CDU Rhineland-Palatinate		Holger Mann MdB
Other members	Christian Tischner MdL, Thuringian Minister of Education		Falko Mohrs, Lower Saxony's Minister of Science
Other members	Johannes Winkel MdB (since 2025), Chairman of Junge Union		Andreas Stoch MdL, Chairman of the SPD Baden-Württemberg
Other members			Ruppert Stüwe MdB

=== Bureaucracy reduction, state modernization, modern justice ===
Role	CDU	CSU	SPD
Chief negotiator	Philipp Amthor MdB, Previously Secretary General of the CDU Mecklenburg-Vorpommern, subsequently State Secretary of the Ministry for Digital Affairs	Daniela Ludwig MdB, subsequently State Secretary, Ministry of the Interior	Sonja Eichwede MdB, spokesperson for legal affairs
Other members	Ralph Brinkhaus MdB, former parliamentary group leader (2018–2022)	Tobias Winkler MdB	Nancy Faeser MdB, former Federal Minister of the Interior
Other members	Daniel Caspary MdEP, Chairman of the CDU/CSU Group	Florian Herrmann MdL, Head of the Bavarian State Chancellery	Andreas Bovenschulte, Mayor of Bremen
Other members	Sandra Gerken, Representative of the State of Schleswig-Holstein to the Federal Government		Sebastian Hartmann MdB, Previously domestic policy spokesperson, subsequently State Secretary, Ministry of Defence
Other members	Hendrik Hoppenstedt MdB, Parliamentary Managing Director		Burkhard Jung, Mayor of Leipzig
Other members	Franziska Hoppermann MdB, CDU treasurer		Esra Limbacher MdB, Chairman of the SPD Saarland
Other members			Kathrin Wahlmann, Lower Saxony's Minister of Justice

=== Municipalities, sports and volunteering ===
Role	CDU	CSU	SPD
Chief negotiator	Christina Stumpp MdB, Deputy Secretary General	Stephan Mayer MdB	Thorsten Kornblum, Mayor of Braunschweig
Other members	Christian Hirte MdB, subsequently State Secretary, Ministry of Transport	Alexander Engelhard MdB	Rasha Nasr MdB
Other members	Thomas Kufen, Mayor of Essen	Franz Löffler, District President of Upper Palatinate	Martin Dulig MdL, Saxony's Minister of Economic Affairs
Other members	Florian Müller MdB		Beate Kimmel, Mayor of Kaiserslautern
Other members	Sepp Müller MdB		Mahmut Özdemir MdB, former State Secretary, Ministry of the Interior
Other members	Johannes Steiniger MdB, Generalsekretär CDU Rheinland-Pfalz		Sabine Poschmann MdB, subsequently State Secretary, Ministry of Construction
Other members			Rita Schwarzelühr-Sutter MdB, previously State Secretary at the Ministry of the Interior, subsequently State Secretary at the Ministry of the Environment

=== Rural areas, agriculture, food, environment ===
Role	CDU	CSU	SPD
Chief negotiator	Steffen Bilger MdB, previously deputy parliamentary group leader, subsequently first parliamentary managing director	Artur Auernhammer MdB, Previously, agricultural policy spokesperson	Franziska Kersten MdB
Other members	Hermann Färber MdB, Chairman of the Agriculture Committee	Martina Englhardt-Kopf MdB, subsequently State Secretary, Ministry of Agriculture	Carsten Träger MdB, subsequently State Secretary, Ministry of the Environment
Other members	Marco Mohrmann MdL, General Secretary of the CDU Lower Saxony, Coordinator of Agricultural Policy, Parliamentary Group Spokesperson	Günther Felßner, Chairman of the Bavarian Farmers' Association	Till Backhaus MdL, Minister of Agriculture Mecklenburg-Vorpommern
Other members	Christine Schneider MdEP		Nadine Heselhaus MdB, Previously a consumer policy spokesperson
Other members	Sven Schulze MdL, Minister of Agriculture of Saxony-Anhalt, Chairman of the CDU Saxony-Anhalt		Helmut Kleebank MdB
Other members	Albert Stegemann MdB		Isabel Mackensen-Geis MdB
Other members			Maria Noichl MdEP, Federal Chairwoman of the SPD Women's Group

=== Foreign Affairs and Defence, Development Cooperation and Human Rights ===
Role	CDU	CSU	SPD
Chief negotiator	Johann Wadephul MdB, Previously deputy parliamentary group leader, subsequently Federal Foreign Minister	Florian Hahn MdB, Previously defence policy spokesperson, subsequently State Secretary at the Foreign Ministry	Svenja Schulze MdB, former Federal Development Minister
Other members	Michael Brand MdB, subsequently State Secretary, Ministry for Families	Thomas Erndl MdB, Spokesperson for International Affairs	Nils Schmid MdB, State Secretary, Ministry of Defence
Other members	Serap Güler MdB, subsequently State Secretary, Foreign Ministry	Wolfgang Stefinger MdB	Sanae Abdi MdB, Previous development policy spokesperson
Other members	Jürgen Hardt MdB, Foreign policy spokesperson		Falko Droßmann MdB, Previously defense policy spokesperson
Other members	Henning Otte MdB		Gabriela Heinrich MdB, Deputy parliamentary group leader
Other members	Norbert Röttgen MdB, Former candidate for party chairmanship (2020/2022)		Siemtje Möller MdB, previously State Secretary, Ministry of Defence
Other members	Thomas Rachel		Marja-Liisa Völlers MdB, Spokesperson for the Seeheimer Kreis
Other members			Frank Schwabe MdB, Previously Commissioner for Religious Freedom, subsequently State Secretary at the Ministry of Justice

=== Europe ===
Role	CDU	CSU	SPD
Chief negotiator	Patricia Lips MdB, Deputy parliamentary group leader	Alexander Radwan MdB	Katarina Barley MEP, Vice President of the European Parliament
Other members	Knut Abraham MdB	Angelika Niebler MdEP, deputy party chair	Adis Ahmetovic MdB
Other members	Gunter Krichbaum MdB, subsequent Minister of State for Europe	Eric Beißwenger MdL, Bavarian State Minister for Europe	Dietmar Nietan MdB, Federal Treasurer of the SPD
Other members	David McAllister MEP, Deputy Chairman of the EVP		René Repasi MEP, Chairman of the SPD group in the S&D-Fraktion
Other members	Wiebke Winter MdBB, Deputy parliamentary group leader Bremen		Johannes Schraps MdB
Other members	Paul Ziemiak MdB, Secretary General of the CDU North Rhine-Westphalia		Derya Türk-Nachbaur MdB
Other members			Thomas Vaupel

=== Culture and Media ===
Role	CDU	CSU	SPD
Chief negotiator	Christiane Schenderlein MdB, Subsequently , State Minister for Sport	Volker Ullrich MdB until 2025	Carsten Brosda, Hamburg's Senator for Culture
Other members	Joe Chialo, Berlin Senator for Culture	Alexander Hoffmann MdB, subsequently Chairman of the CSU State Group	Heike Raab, Rhineland-Palatinate representative to the Federal Government
Other members	Ansgar Heveling MdB	Julia Lehner, First Deputy Mayor of Nuremberg	Hakan Demir MdB
Other members	Nathanael Liminski, Head of the State Chancellery of North Rhine-Westphalia		Timon Gremmels, Hessian Minister of Culture
Other members	Jan Redmann MdL, Chairman of the CDU Brandenburg		Helge Lindh MdB
Other members	Sabine Verheyen MdEP, First Vice President of the European Parliament		Martin Rabanus MdB
Other members			Alexander Vogt MdL, Deputy Parliamentary Group Leader North Rhine-Westphalia

=== Climate and energy ===
Role	CDU	CSU	SPD
Chief negotiator	Andreas Jung MdB, deputy party chairman	Martin Huber MdL, Secretary General	Olaf Lies MdL, Lower Saxony's Minister of Economic Affairs
Other members	Thomas Gebhart MdB	Anja Weisgerber MdB	Nina Scheer MdB
Other members	Jan Heinisch MdL, Deputy Parliamentary Group Leader North Rhine-Westphalia	Andreas Lenz MdB	Jakob Blankenburg MdB
Other members	Mark Helfrich MdB		Delara Burkhardt MdB
Other members	Tilman Kuban MdB		Ulf Kämpfer, Mayor of Kiel
Other members	Lars Rohwer MdB		Johann Saathoff MdB, previously State Secretary at the Ministry of the Interior, subsequently State Secretary at the Ministry of Economic Cooperation and Development
Other members			Dietmar Woidke MdL, Minister-President of Brandenburg

=== Budget, Finances and Taxes ===
Role	CDU	CSU	SPD
Chief negotiator	Mathias Middelberg MdB, Deputy parliamentary group leader	Florian Oßner MdB	Dennis Rohde MdB, subsequently State Secretary, Ministry of Finance
Other members	Fritz Güntzler MdB	Mechthilde Wittmann MdB	Doris Ahnen MdL, Finance Minister of Rhineland-Palatinate
Other members	Christian Haase MdB, Federal Chairman of KPV	Albert Füracker MdL, Bavarian Interior Minister	Bettina Hagedorn MdB
Other members	Matthias Hauer MdB, subsequently State Secretary, Ministry of Research		Tim Klüssendorf MdB Spokesperson for the Parliamentary Left, subsequently General Secretary of the SPD
Other members	Ralph Alexander Lorz MdL, Hessian Finance Minister		Frank Meyer, Mayor of Krefeld
Other members	Marcus Optendrenk MdL, North Rhine-Westphalian Finance Minister		Michael Schrodi MdB, subsequently State Secretary, Ministry of Finance
Other members			Jakob von Weizsäcker MdL, Saarland Finance Minister

== See also ==
- List of participants in the Scholz cabinet coalition negotiations
