= List of participants in the Scholz cabinet coalition negotiations =

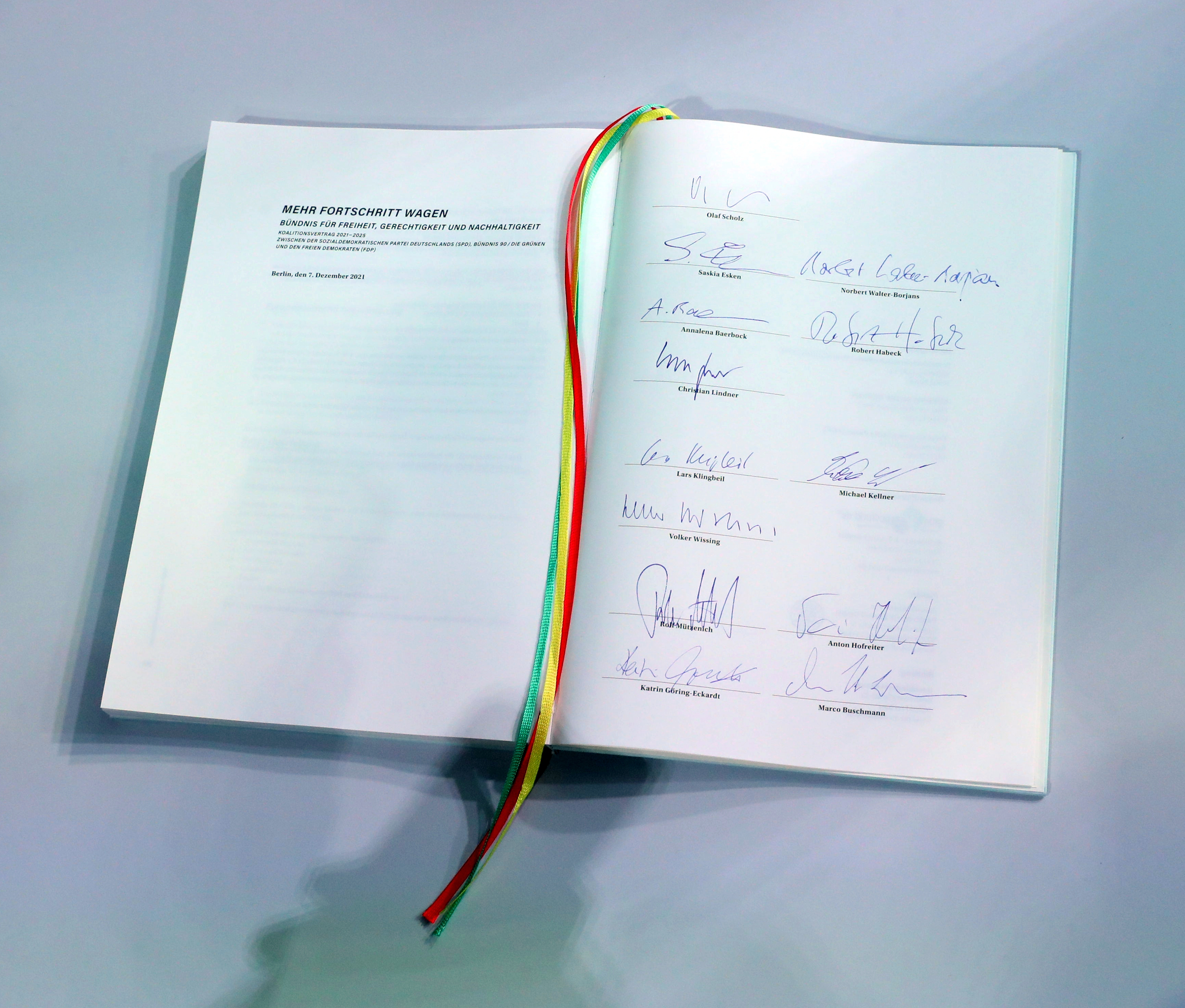
Signing of the coalition agreement for the 20th legislative period of the German Bundestag on 7 December 2021 in Berlin

The list of participants in the coalition negotiations between the SPD, Alliance 90/The Greens and the FDP in 2021 lists the people who took part in the coalition negotiations between the parties following the 2021 German federal election.

On 4 December 2021, the delegates of a special SPD party conference approved the traffic light coalition agreement for the Scholz cabinet with 98.8% of the votes, on 5 December 2021, the delegates of a largely digital extraordinary FDP federal party conference approved it with 92.24% of the votes and on 6 December 2021, 86% of the members of Alliance 90/The Greens approved it in a ballot vote.

== Top group ==
=== SPD ===
- Olaf Scholz, candidate for chancellor
- Saskia Esken, SPD chairwoman
- Norbert Walter-Borjans, SPD chairman
- Rolf Mützenich, Chairman of the SPD parliamentary group
- Lars Klingbeil, General Secretary of the SPD
- Malu Dreyer, Minister-President of Rhineland-Palatinate
- Manuela Schwesig, Minister-President of Mecklenburg-Vorpommern & Chairwoman of the SPD Mecklenburg-Vorpommern

=== Greens ===
- Annalena Baerbock, party leader
- Robert Habeck, party chairman
- Katrin Göring-Eckardt, parliamentary group leader
- Anton Hofreiter, parliamentary group leader
- Britta Haßelmann, parliamentary group manager
- Claudia Roth, Vice President of the Bundestag
- Ricarda Lang, deputy party leader
- Michael Kellner, party manager
- Winfried Kretschmann, Minister-President of Baden-Württemberg

=== FDP ===
The FDP was represented by its executive committee:

- Christian Lindner, FDP party chairman
- Volker Wissing, FDP General Secretary
- Wolfgang Kubicki, deputy FDP chairman
- Nicola Beer, deputy FDP chairwoman
- Johannes Vogel, deputy FDP chairman
- Marco Buschmann, parliamentary manager of the FDP parliamentary group
- Lydia Hüskens, Chairwoman of the FDP Saxony-Anhalt
- Michael Theurer, Chairman of the FDP Baden-Württemberg
- Bettina Stark-Watzinger, parliamentary manager of the FDP parliamentary group
- Harald Christ, FDP treasurer
- Moritz Körner, Member of the European Parliament

== Working groups ==
22 working groups were formed, led by the chief negotiators of each party.

=== Modern State and Democracy ===
Role	SPD	Greens	FDP
Chief negotiator	Thomas Kutschaty	Britta Haßelmann	Konstantin Kuhle
Other members	Verena Hubertz	Till Steffen	Bernd Buchholz
Other members	Dirk Wiese	Martin Hagen	Matthias Frey
Other members	Marianne Schieder	Florian Stegmann	Judith Pirscher

=== Digital Innovations and Digital Infrastructure ===
Role	SPD	Greens	FDP
Chief negotiator	Jens Zimmermann	Malte Spitz	Andreas Pinkwart
Other members	Falko Mohrs	Anna Christmann	Mario Brandenburg
Other members	Jan Pörksen	Jan Philipp Albrecht	Manuel Höferlin
Other members	Elvan Korkmaz-Emre	Alexandra Geese	Bernd Schlömer

=== Innovation, Science and Research ===
Role	SPD	Greens	FDP
Chief negotiator	Thomas Losse-Müller	Katharina Fegebank	Lydia Hüskens
Other members	Manja Schüle	Kai Gehring	Jens Brandenburg
Other members	Wiebke Esdar	Angela Dorn-Rancke	Magnus Buhlert
Other members	Michael Müller	Dieter Janecek	Thomas Sattelberger

=== Business ===
Role	SPD	Greens	FDP
Chief negotiator	Carsten Schneider	Cem Özdemir	Michael Theurer
Other members	Peter Tschentscher	Katharina Dröge	Torsten Herbst
Other members	Sabine Poschmann	Maik Außendorf	Reinhard Houben
Other members	Bernd Westphal	Anna Cavazzini	Michael Kruse
Other members	Johann Saathoff	Anna Kebschull	Andreas Reichel
Other members	Gabriele Katzmarek	Claudia Müller	Daniela Schmitt

=== Environmental and nature conservation ===
Role	SPD	Greens	FDP
Chief negotiator	Rita Schwarzelühr-Sutter	Steffi Lemke	Stefan Birkner
Other members	Florian von Brunn	Bettina Hofmann	Olaf in der Beek
Other members	Carsten Träger	Jutta Paulus	Karlheinz Busen
Other members	Isabel Mackensen-Geis	Axel Vogel	Judith Skudelny

=== Agriculture and nutrition ===
Role	SPD	Greens	FDP
Chief negotiator	Till Backhaus	Renate Künast	Carina Konrad
Other members	Susanne Mittag	Priska Hinz	Andy Becht
Other members	Olaf Lies	Harald Ebner	Lukas Braun
Other members	Franziska Kersten	Martin Häusling	Gero Hocker

=== Mobility ===
Role	SPD	Greens	FDP
Chief negotiator	Anke Rehlinger	Anton Hofreiter	Oliver Luksic
Other members	Dorothee Martin	Tarek Al-Wazir	Daniela Kluckert
Other members	Andreas Bovenschulte	Matthias Gastel	Christof Rasche
Other members	Sören Bartol	Maike Schaefer	Daniela Schmitt

=== Climate, Energy, Transformation ===
Role	SPD	Greens	FDP
Chief negotiator	Matthias Miersch	Oliver Krischer	Lukas Köhler
Other members	Stephan Weil	Anne Spiegel	Nicole Bauer
Other members	Svenja Schulze	Michael Bloss	Andreas Pinkwart
Other members	Dietmar Woidke	Tobias Goldschmidt	René Rock
Other members	Delara Burkhardt	Ingrid Nestle	Michael Theurer
Other members	Kathrin Michel	Jürgen Trittin	Sandra Weeser

=== Welfare state, basic security, pension ===
Role	SPD	Greens	FDP
Chief negotiator	Dagmar Schmidt	Sven Lehmann	Johannes Vogel
Other members	Melanie Leonhard	Markus Kurth	Dennys Bornhöft
Other members	Martin Rosemann	Stephanie Aeffner	Sylvia Bruns
Other members	Martin Dulig	Belit Onay	Heiner Garg
Other members	Katja Mast	Udo Philipp	Pascal Kober
Other members	Rasha Nasr	Christiane Rohleder	

=== Work ===
Role	SPD	Greens	FDP
Chief negotiator	Hubertus Heil	Katharina Dröge	Johannes Vogel
Other members	Alexander Schweitzer	Frank Bsirske	Jens Brandenburg
Other members	Yasmin Fahimi	Beate Müller-Gemmeke	Bernd Buchholz
Other members	Jessica Rosenthal	Wolfgang Strengmann-Kuhn	Jens Teutrine

=== Building and Living ===
Role	SPD	Greens	FDP
Chief negotiator	Kevin Kühnert	Christian Kühn	Daniel Föst
Other members	Dorothee Stapelfeldt	Daniela Wagner	Christoph Dammermann
Other members	Bernhard Daldrup	Canan Bayram	Sebastian Körber
Other members	Claudia Tausend	Stephan Kühn	Hagen Reinhold

=== Health and Care ===
Role	SPD	Greens	FDP
Chief negotiator	Katja Pähle	Maria Klein-Schmeink	Christine Aschenberg-Dugnus
Other members	Bärbel Bas	Janosch Dahmen	Heiner Garg
Other members	Karl Lauterbach	Manfred Lucha	Andrew Ullmann
Other members	Daniela Behrens	Kordula Schulz-Asche	Nicole Westig

=== Education and Opportunities for All ===
Role	SPD	Greens	FDP
Chief negotiator	Andreas Stoch	Felix Banaszak	Jens Brandenburg
Other members	Ties Rabe	Theresa Schopper	Björn Försterling
Other members	Stefanie Hubig	Anke Erdmann	Yvonne Gebauer
Other members	Oliver Kaczmarek	Lasse Petersdotter	Thomas Sattelberger

=== Children, families, seniors and youth ===
Role	SPD	Greens	FDP
Chief negotiator	Serpil Midyatli	Katrin Göring-Eckardt	Stephan Thomae
Other members	Sönke Rix	Ekin Deligöz	Jens Beeck
Other members	Antje Draheim	Katja Keul	Maren Jasper-Winter
Other members	Stefan Schwartze	Anja Stahmann	Jens Teutrine

=== Cultural and media policy ===
Role	SPD	Greens	FDP
Chief negotiator	Carsten Brosda	Claudia Roth	Otto Fricke
Other members	Heike Raab	Theresia Bauer	Thomas Hacker
Other members	Michelle Müntefering	Erhard Grundl	Thomas Nückel
Other members	Bettina Martin	Tabea Rößner	Christopher Vorwerk

=== Internal Security, Civil Rights, Justice, Consumer Protection, Sports ===
Role	SPD	Greens	FDP
Chief negotiator	Christine Lambrecht	Konstantin von Notz	Wolfgang Kubicki
Other members	Katarina Barley	Irene Mihalic	Svenja Hahn
Other members	Thomas Hitschler	Lamya Kaddor	Konstantin Kuhle
Other members	Georg Maier	Sergey Lagodinsky	Matthias Schulenberg
Other members	Mahmut Özdemir	Manuela Rottmann	Benjamin Strasser
Other members	Johannes Fechner	Verena Schäffer	Stephan Thomae

=== Equality and Diversity ===
Role	SPD	Greens	FDP
Chief negotiator	Petra Köpping	Ricarda Lang	Herbert Mertin
Other members	Leni Breymaier	Aminata Touré	Martin Hagen
Other members	Karamba Diaby	Gesine Agena	Katrin Helling-Plahr
Other members	Kaweh Mansoori	Ulle Schauws	Michael Kauch

=== Good living conditions in town and country ===
Role	SPD	Greens	FDP
Chief negotiator	Frank Junge	Manuela Rottmann	Marie-Agnes Strack-Zimmermann
Other members	Sabine Bätzing-Lichtenthäler	Katja Dörner	Kai Abruszat
Other members	Sören Link	Stefan Schmidt	Torsten Herbst
Other members	Elisabeth Kaiser	Franziska Schubert	Thomas Nitzsche

=== Flight, Migration, Integration ===
Role	SPD	Greens	FDP
Chief negotiator	Boris Pistorius	Luise Amtsberg	Joachim Stamp
Other members	Frank Schwabe	Erik Marquardt	Hans-Ulrich Rülke
Other members	Nancy Faeser	Dirk Adams	Linda Teuteberg
Other members	Aydan Özoğuz	Filiz Polat	Stephan Thomae

=== Foreign Affairs, Security, Defence, Development, Human Rights ===
Role	SPD	Greens	FDP
Chief negotiator	Heiko Maas	Omid Nouripour	Alexander Graf Lambsdorff
Other members	Siemtje Möller	Agnieszka Brugger	Bijan Djir-Sarai
Other members	Dietmar Nietan	Reinhard Bütikofer	Gyde Jensen
Other members	Bärbel Kofler	Tobias Lindner	Michael Georg Link
Other members	Gabriela Heinrich	Hannah Neumann	Frank Müller-Rosentritt
Other members	Nils Schmid	Pegah Edalatian	Marie-Agnes Strack-Zimmermann

=== Europe ===
Role	SPD	Greens	FDP
Chief negotiator	Udo Bullmann	Franziska Brantner	Nicola Beer
Other members	Jens Geier	Jamila Schäfer	Christian Dürr
Other members	Michael Roth	Terry Reintke	Michael Georg Link
Other members	Gabriele Bischoff	Manuel Sarrazin	Frank Schäffler

=== Finance and Budget ===
Role	SPD	Greens	FDP
Chief negotiator	Doris Ahnen	Lisa Paus	Christian Dürr
Other members	Sarah Ryglewski	Anja Hajduk	Otto Fricke
Other members	Achim Post	Danyal Bayaz	Christian Grascha
Other members	Michael Schrodi	Sven Giegold	Katja Hessel
Other members	Dennis Rohde	Monika Heinold	Moritz Körner
Other members	Cansel Kiziltepe	Sven-Christian Kindler	Florian Toncar

== See also ==
- List of participants in the Merz cabinet coalition negotiations
