= Mohrmann =

Mohrmann is a surname. Notable people with the surname include:

- Christine Mohrmann (1903–1988), Dutch academic
- Dieter Möhrmann (born 1948), German politician
- Marco Mohrmann (born 1973), German politician
