= SPD Party Executive Committee =

Governing body of the Social Democratic Party of Germany

Party Executive Committee of the SPD
- SPD-Partivorstand

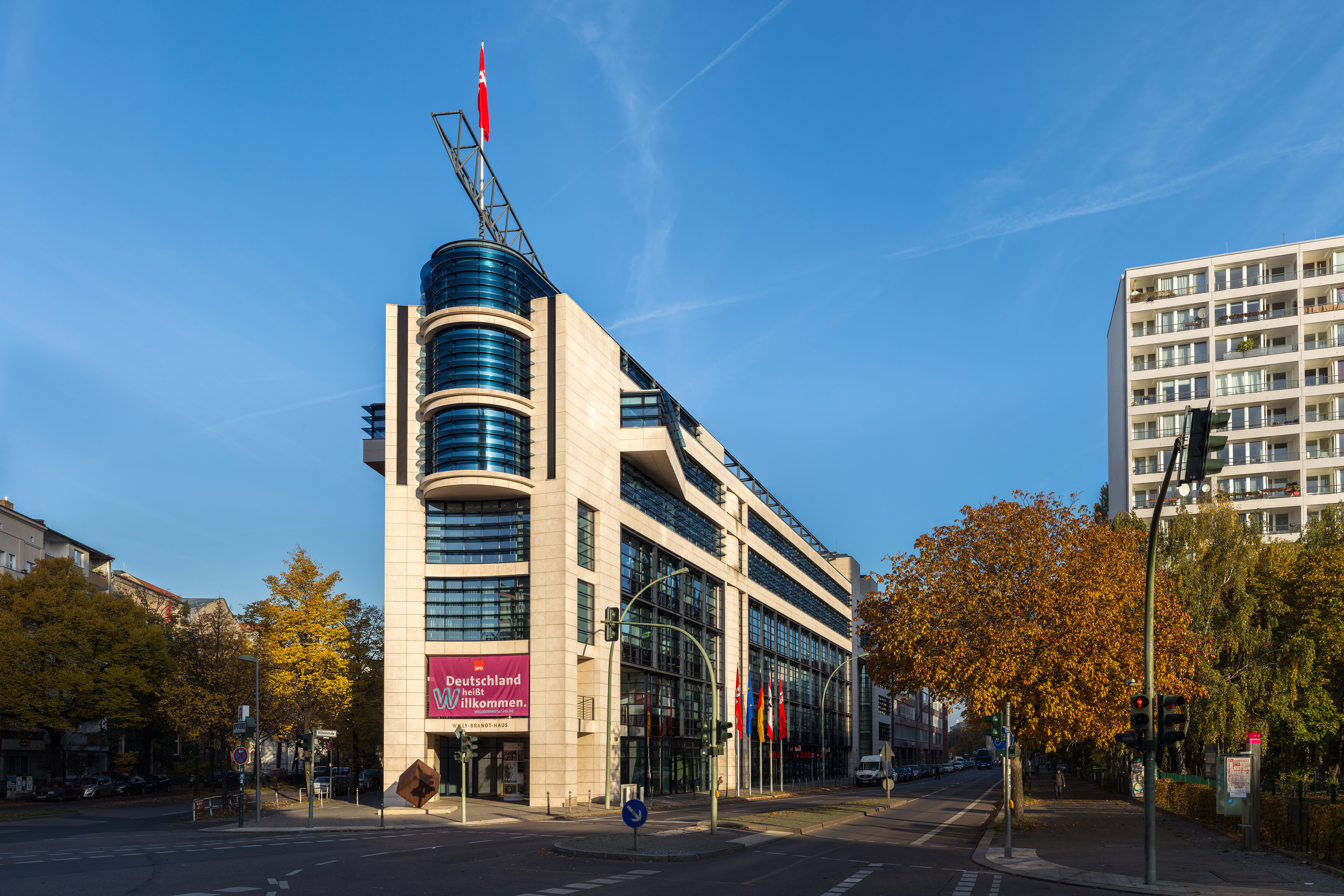
- Headquarters: Willy-Brandt-Haus D-10911, Wilhelmstraße, Berlin
- Parent organisation: Social Democratic Party of Germany
- Website: Unser Parteivorstand

The Party Executive Committee (German: Parteivorstand) (Note: More commonly translated into English as just Executive Committee or Party Executive, sometimes with a "Federal" or "National" prefixed to distinguish from State Party governing bodies) is the governing body of the Social Democratic Party of Germany (SPD). The executive is responsible for implementing resolutions of the Party Diet of the SPD, as well as managing the party, and organising party diets. It is also responsible for electing the Party Presidium from its numbers.

The body consists of the SPD co-leaders, Deputy Party Leaders, the General Secretary, the Party Treasurer and the party's spokesperson for EU affairs, as well as additional elected members.

From 1950, the seat of the party executive and the party's federal headquarters was a temporary building in Bonn, also known as the "Baracke", which was replaced by the Erich-Ollenhauer-Haus in 1975. In 1999, the party executive moved its headquarters to the Willy-Brandt-Haus in Berlin.

== Composition ==
According to the 2024 edition of the SPD's constitution, the Party Executive Committee is made up of:

- the Leader of the SPD (or co-leaders),
- the five Deputy Leaders of the SPD,
- the General Secretary of the SPD,
- the party Treasurer,
- the party's spokesperson for EU affairs, and
- a number of additional members elected by internal list elections

Additionally, the chairperson of the SPD's Control Commission sits on the committee in an advisory capacity.

The committee is forbidden by the SPD's constitution from exceeding 34 members.

== Current members ==
Diagram of the Organisational structure of the Social Democratic Party (in German)

Since the 2023 SPD Party Diet, the current members of the executive committee are:

Leaders of the SPD

- Lars Klingbeil

Deputy Leaders of the SPD

- Petra Köpping
- Alexander Schweitzer (politician)
- Achim Post
- Serpil Midyatli
- Anke Rehlinger

General Secretary

- Tim Klüssendorf

Party Treasurer

- Dietmar Nietan

EU Spokesperson

- Katarina Barley

Presidium member

- Kaweh Mansoori
- Katja Pähle
- Andreas Stoch

Additional committee members

- Sabine Bätzing-Lichtenthäler
- Andreas Bovenschulte
- Ronja Endres
- Wiebke Esdar
- Fabian Ferber
- Timon Gremmels
- Oliver Kaczmarek
- Elisabeth Kaiser
- Annika Klose
- Thorsten Kornblum
- Sarah Lahrkamp
- Bettina Martin
- Katja Mast
- Siemtje Möller
- Sarah Philipp
- Boris Pistorius
- Sebastian Roloff
- Jessica Rosenthal
- Dagmar Schmidt
- Marja-Liisa Völlers
- Ibrahim Yetim

== See also ==
- Federal Board of the CDU
- NEC of the UK Labour Party
