= Mitte 1 (electoral district) =

State electoral district of Germany

- Electoral district for the Berlin House of Representatives
- Mitte 1 in 2026
- District: Mitte
- Electorate: 32,501 (2026)

Current electoral district
- Party: Green
- Member: Silke Gebel

Mitte 1 is an electoral constituency (German: Wahlkreis) represented in the House of Representatives of Berlin. It elects one member via first-past-the-post voting.

== Geography ==
The constituency comprises the areas of Charité, Oranienburger Tor, and Zionskirchplatz within the borough of Mitte.

There were 29,975 eligible voters in 2023.

== Members ==
Election	Member	Party	%
1990	Garbiele Schöttler	SPD	31.3
1995	Thomas Flierl	PDS	33.1
1999	Benjamin-Immanuel Hoff	PDS	33.8
2001	Benjamin-Immanuel Hoff	PDS	30.5
2006	Markus Pauzenberger	SPD	32.1
2011	Ramona Pop	Green	32.1
2016	Ramona Pop	Green	29.9
2021	Silke Gebel	Green	35.2
2023	Silke Gebel	Green	33.5
2026	Silke Gebel	Green	28.4

== Election results ==
=== 2026 election ===
State election (2026): Mitte 1
Notes:	Blue background denotes the winner of the electorate vote. Pink background denotes a candidate elected from their party list. Yellow background denotes an electorate win by a list member, or other incumbent. A ✓ or ✗ denotes status of any incumbent, win or lose respectively.						
Party	Candidate	Votes	%	±%	Party votes	%	±%
Greens	✓ Silke Gebel	7,220	28.4	▼5.1	6,049	24.0	▼6.6
Left	Anna Eiling	6,409	25.2	▲11.9	6,695	26.6	▲13.8
CDU	Monika Trautmann	4,117	16.2	▼5.7	4,819	19.1	▼1.5
SPD	Stanislav Klimovich	2,861	11.2	▼5.3	2,700	10.7	▼4.5
AfD	Sabine Schüler	1,615	6.3	▲2.3	1,673	6.6	▲2.6
Volt	Anna Auerbach	1,339	5.3		1,125	4.5	▲1.8
FDP	Maren Jasper-Winter	1,066	4.2	▼3.4	873	3.5	▼4.6
BSW	Sven Diedrich	696	2.7		743	3.0	
Tierschutzpartei					205	0.8	▼0.5
PARTEI					152	0.6	▼0.8
Independent	Jörg Kanzler	120	0.5				
PdF					61	0.2	
DKP					31	0.1	▼0.1
ÖDP					22	0.1	Steady
du.					18	0.1	▼0.2
SGP					4	0.0	Steady
Informal votes		260			533		
Total valid votes		25,443			25,170		
Turnout		25,703	79.1	▲11.3			
Greens hold	Majority	811	3.2	▼8.4			

=== 2023 repeat election ===
Changes denoted below for the 2023 election are compared to the 2016 election, as the 2021 election was declared invalid.

State election (2023): Mitte 1
Notes:	Blue background denotes the winner of the electorate vote. Pink background denotes a candidate elected from their party list. Yellow background denotes an electorate win by a list member, or other incumbent. A ✓ or ✗ denotes status of any incumbent, win or lose respectively.						
Party	Candidate	Votes	%	±%	Party votes	%	±%
Greens	✓ Silke Gebel	6,758	33.5	▲3.6	6,189	30.6	▲4.1
CDU	Peter Pielen	4,418	21.9	▲5.5	4,169	20.6	▲5.7
SPD	Astrid Hollmann	3,332	16.5	▼5.2	3,077	15.2	▼3.8
Left	Liên Grützmacher	2,688	13.3	▼1.1	2,594	12.8	▼2.4
FDP	Maren Jasper-Winter	1,541	7.6	▼1.0	1,625	8.0	▼2.8
AfD	Sabine Schüler	824	4.1	▼2.6	822	4.1	▼2.7
Volt					536	2.6	
PARTEI					282	1.4	▼0.8
Tierschutzpartei	Silvia Stoffels	440	2.2		258	1.3	▲0.3
dieBasis	Ralph Schmid	194	1.0		132	0.7	
Klimaliste					80	0.4	
Team Todenhöfer					61	0.3	
Mieterpartei					56	0.3	
Pirates					47	0.2	▼1.6
du.					46	0.2	
DKP					37	0.2	Steady
The Grays					37	0.2	
Humanists					35	0.2	
Verjüngungsforschung					31	0.2	▼0.1
FW					28	0.1	
Gray Panthers					26	0.1	▼0.3
Bergpartei, die ÜberPartei					16	0.1	
Bildet Berlin!					12	0.1	
ÖDP					12	0.1	
SGP					9	0.0	▼0.1
NPD					6	0.0	▼0.2
The Pinks/Alliance 21					4	0.0	
LKR					3	0.0	▼0.3
BüSo					2	0.0	
Informal votes		104			69		
Total valid votes		20,195			20,232		
Turnout		20,316	67.8	▼3.9			
Greens hold	Majority	2,340	11.6				

=== 2021 election (annulled) ===
The election in 2021 was annulled and rerun in 2023.

State election (2021): Mitte 1
Notes:	Blue background denotes the winner of the electorate vote. Pink background denotes a candidate elected from their party list. Yellow background denotes an electorate win by a list member, or other incumbent. A ✓ or ✗ denotes status of any incumbent, win or lose respectively.						
Party	Candidate	Votes	%	±%	Party votes	%	±%
Greens	✓ Silke Gebel	8,680	35.2	▲5.3	7,750	31.3	▲4.8
SPD	Astrid Hollmann	4,306	17.5	▼4.2	3,821	15.4	▼3.5
CDU	Peter Pielen	3,677	14.9	▼1.5	3,330	13.4	▼1.4
Left	Liên Grützmacher	3,490	14.2	▼0.3	3,523	14.2	▼1.0
FDP	Maren Jasper-Winter	2,699	10.9	▲2.3	2,699	10.9	▲0.1
Volt					899	3.6	
AfD	Sabine Schüler	827	3.4	▼3.4	842	3.4	▼3.4
PARTEI					426	1.7	▼0.4
Tierschutzpartei	Silvia Stoffels	512	2.1		253	1.0	Steady
dieBasis	Ralph Schmid	468	1.9		309	1.2	
Klimaliste					166	0.7	
Team Todenhöfer					157	0.6	
FW					99	0.4	
Pirates					83	0.3	▼1.5
The Grays					57	0.2	
Humanists					52	0.2	
APT					41	0.2	
du.					40	0.2	
Gray Panthers					40	0.2	▼0.2
Mieterpartei					38	0.2	
Bergpartei, die ÜberPartei					35	0.1	
DKP					24	0.1	▼0.1
Verjüngungsforschung					23	0.1	▼0.2
ÖDP					20	0.1	
Bildet Berlin!					17	0.1	
NPD					9	0.0	▼0.1
The Pinks/Alliance					7	0.0	
LKR					6	0.0	▼0.3
SGP					4	0.0	▼0.1
BüSo					3	0.0	Steady
Informal votes		175			116		
Total valid votes		24,834			24,889		
Turnout		24,930	82.9	▲11.2			
Greens hold	Majority	4,374	17.7				

== See also ==
- Politics of Berlin
- House of Representatives of Berlin
