= Antje Kapek =

German politician (born 1976)

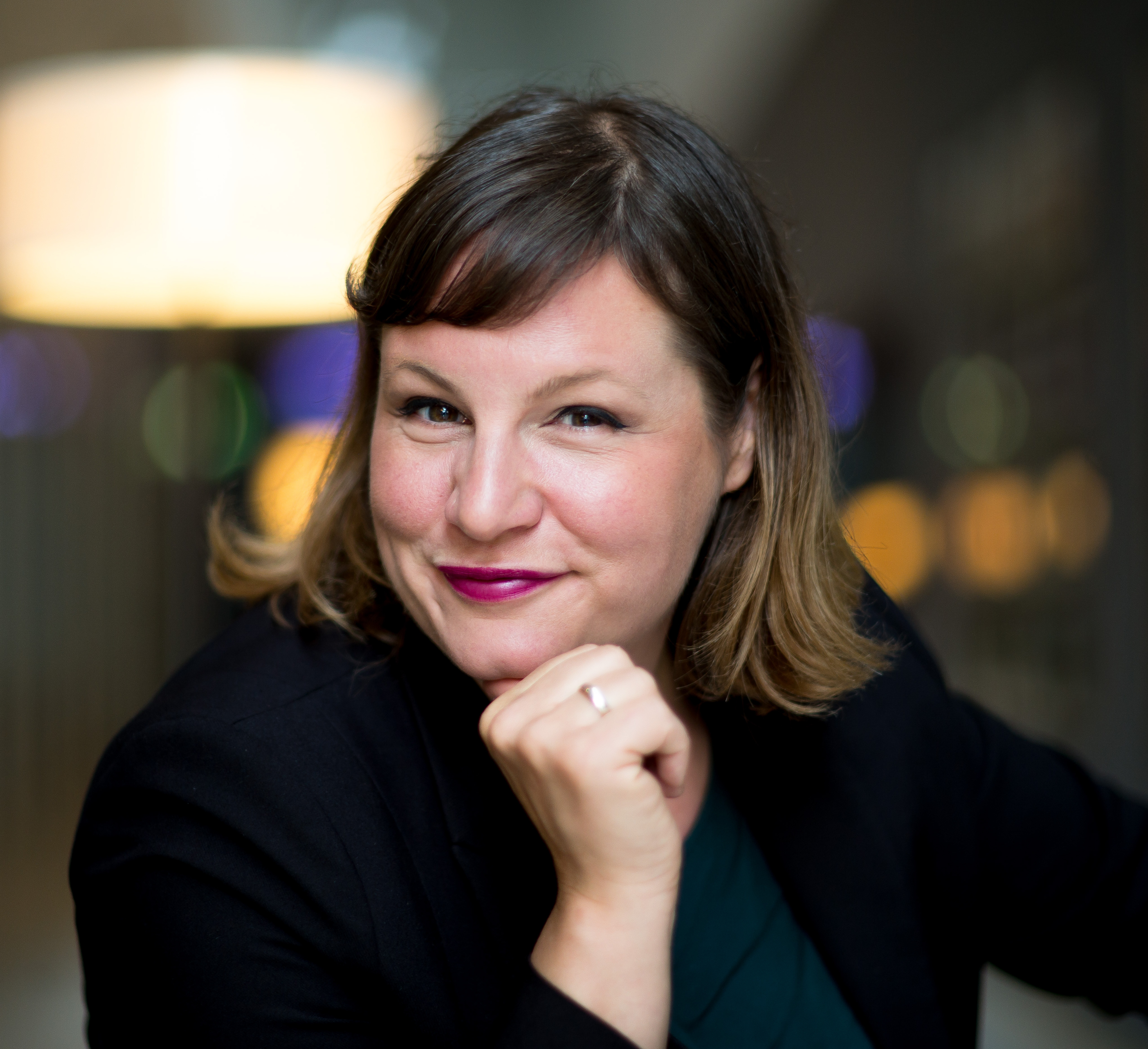
- Kapek in 2020

Leader of Alliance 90/The Greens in the Abgeordnetenhaus of Berlin
- In office 30 October 2012 – 15 March 2022 Serving with Ramona Pop (until Dec. 2016) and Silke Gebel (from Dec. 2016)
- Preceded by: Volker Ratzmann
- Succeeded by: Werner Graf

Member of the Abgeordnetenhaus of Berlin
- Incumbent
- Assumed office 19 September 2011

Personal details
- Born: Antje Kapek; 20 September 1976 (age 50) Kreuzberg, West Berlin
- Party: Alliance 90/The Greens
- Education: Free University of Berlin; Technische Universität Berlin; Humboldt University of Berlin

Antje Kapek (born 20 September 1976) is a German politician of Alliance 90/The Greens. From 2012 to 2022, she was co-chair of the Greens parliamentary group in the Abgeordnetenhaus of Berlin. She was co-lead candidate in the 2016 Berlin state election alongside Ramona Pop, Bettina Jarasch, and Daniel Wesener.

== Early life and education ==
Kapek was born and raised in the Kreuzberg neighbourhood, then in West Berlin. She is the daughter of Frank Kapek, a former Green politician who served as member of the Abgeordnetenhaus from 1987 to 1989. After graduating from the Robert Blum Gymnasium in Schöneberg, she studied geography with minors in law, transportation planning, and environmental management at the Free University of Berlin, Technische Universität Berlin, and the Humboldt University of Berlin. Subsequently, she studied for a master's degree in Urban and Regional Planning in the Netherlands, from which she earned a post-graduate degree. Kapek was also a scholarship holder of the German Academic Scholarship Foundation. From 2007 to 2011, she was a research assistant to Michael Cramer, Member of the European Parliament. Kapek is married and mother to two children, and lives with her family in Kreuzberg.

== Political career ==
=== Career in state politics ===
Kapek has been a member of the Alliance 90/The Greens since 2005. She was compelled to enter politics after living and studying in the Netherlands in the early 2000s, during which time she witnessed the conservative shift in society which followed the assassination of Pim Fortuyn. From 2006 to 2011, she was a member of the municipal council of Friedrichshain-Kreuzberg. From 2008, she was co-chair of the Greens faction there alongside Daniel Wesener. She was also spokeswoman for urban development, environment, and transport policy.

Kapek was elected to the Abgeordnetenhaus of Berlin in the 2011 Berlin state election via the state list, on which she was placed third. She became spokeswoman for urban development policy and, from November, deputy chair of the Greens faction. On 30 October 2012, she became co-leader of the parliamentary group, alongside Ramona Pop.

In October 2015, Kapek was nominated as part of a four-member team of lead candidates for the 2016 Berlin state election alongside Bettina Jarasch, Ramona Pop, and Daniel Wesener. Kapek was placed second on the state-wide party list, and was elected to the Abgeordnetenhaus. She also ran in the constituency Lichtenberg 4, winning 10.0% of votes. Post-election, she was a member of the main negotiating group which led the formation of the red–red–green government. In December, she was re-elected as parliamentary group leader; Silke Gebel succeeded Ramona Pop as her counterpart.

In April 2021, she was again elected to second place on the Greens state list for the 2021 Berlin state election. She was re-elected as both member of the Abgeordnetenhaus and subsequently as co-leader of the Greens faction.

On 22 February 2022, Kapek unexpectedly announced that she would resign as leader, citing mental and physical exhaustion from political work. She was succeeded by Werner Graf on 15 March.

=== Role in national politics ===
Kapek was nominated by her party as delegate to the Federal Convention for the purpose of electing the President of Germany in 2017 and 2022.

== Political positions ==
Kapek is considered a representative of the left wing of the Greens. She advocates political transparency, citizen participation, the preservation of public spaces, and social and cultural diversity. She supports citizens' petitions and advocates the integration of social housing in new construction projects.

=== Transportation ===
Kapek believes that a major turnaround is needed in transportation in Berlin. She described the mobility law of the second Müller senate as a "law for the most vulnerable road users", such as children and the elderly. She advocates a "fairer distribution" of road space in Berlin, making it more accessible to the public, and improving traffic safety through stricter speed limits, increased traffic control, more speed cameras, and higher fines.

In 2017, Kapek proposed the introduction of a fare-free student ticket for public transit, stating this would ease the burden for "very, very many Berlin families". This was passed by the state government on 2018 and introduced in 2019. She also called for a new funding model to expand public transport and close gaps in the existing network, suggesting the introduction of a general "citizen ticket" paid by all Berliners, and potentially a congestion charge.

=== Urban development ===
Kapek advocates socially responsible urban development that makes the preservation of "Berlin's lively blend of people, architecture, art, and culture" the basis of future policy. She views public participation as a key tool to involve people in the process of change, and for avoiding conflicts over the development of neighbourhoods.

She also calls for the purchase of "citywide areas for green development" and for more resources to be spent on the maintenance and preservation of urban green spaces. In her view, green spaces are "systemically relevant," which became even more apparent during the COVID-19 pandemic.

In response to the state of the Berlin housing market, Kapek has called for tightening of tenancy laws and expansion of tenant protection. She described housing policy as "the social issue of the next decade", and that it was essential to ensure that Berlin remained affordable for all.

=== Tempelhofer Feld ===
Kapek has repeatedly spoken out against building on the edges of Tempelhofer Feld, and defended the results of the referendum on the area, which saw 64% of voters support restricting development in the park. She states that thought should be given to preserving green spaces as places of recreation rather than construction. Kapek advocates further developing Tempelhofer Feld as a "Central Park", and has repeatedly suggested that a swimming lake be created in its centre.
