= Alexandra Geese =

German interpreter and politician (born 1968)

Alexandra Geese MEP
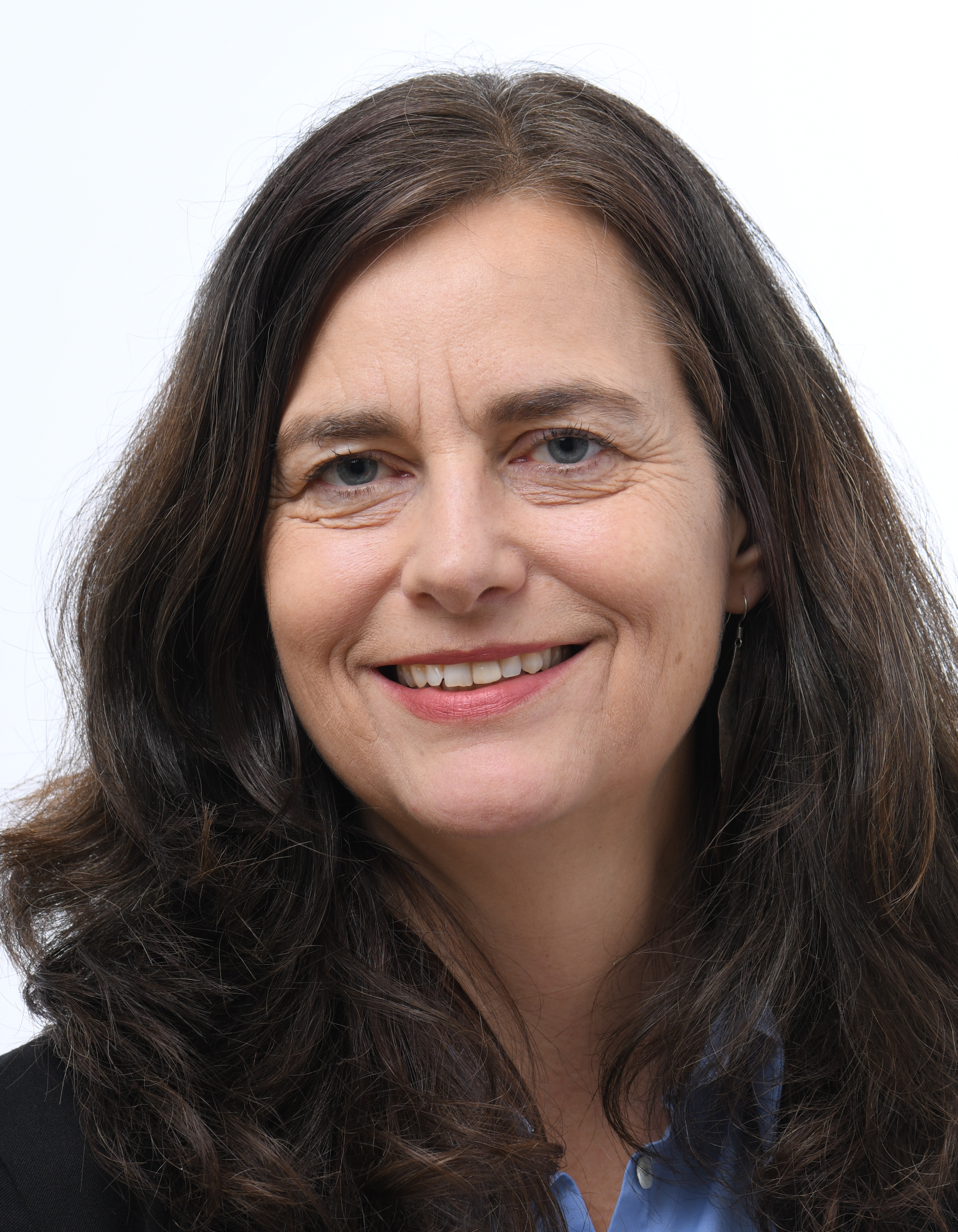

Member of the European Parliament for Germany
- Incumbent
- Assumed office 2 July 2019

Personal details
- Born: July 1, 1968 (age 58) Lippstadt, West Germany
- Party: German; Alliance 90/The Greens; EU; European Green Party
- Education: Cologne University of Applied Sciences

Alexandra Geese (born 1 July 1968) is a German interpreter and politician of the Alliance 90/The Greens who has been serving as a Member of the European Parliament since 2019.

== Career ==
From 1987 until 2010, Geese lived and worked in Italy.

From 2015 until 2019, Geese worked as interpreter at the European Parliament.

Geese has been a Member of the European Parliament since the 2019 European elections. She has since been serving on the Committee on Budgets and the Committee on the Internal Market and Consumer Protection. In 2020, she also joined the Special Committee on Artificial Intelligence in a Digital Age. Since 2021, she has been her parliamentary group's shadow rapporteur on the Digital Services Act (DSA).

In addition to her committee assignments, Geese is part of the Parliament's delegations for relations with Iraq (since 2019) and Latin America (since 2021). She is also a member of the European Internet Forum the European Parliament Intergroup on Artificial Intelligence and Digital, the European Parliament Intergroup on Anti-Racism and Diversity, and the European Parliament Intergroup on Children's Rights.

In the negotiations to form a so-called traffic light coalition of the Social Democratic Party (SPD), the Green Party and the Free Democratic Party (FDP) following the 2021 German elections, Geese was part of her party's delegation in the working group on digital innovation and infrastructure, co-chaired by Jens Zimmermann, Malte Spitz and Andreas Pinkwart.

In the negotiations to form a coalition government of the Christian Democratic Union (CDU) and the Green Party under Minister-President of North Rhine-Westphalia Hendrik Wüst following the 2022 state elections, Geese and Raoul Roßbach led their party's delegation in the working group on research, innovation and digitization; their counterpart from the CDU was Anja Karliczek.

== Personal life ==
She was born in Lippstadt. Geese has three daughters. The family lives in Bonn's Kessenich district.
