= Thorsten Kornblum =

German politician (born 1982)

Mayor of Braunschweig
- Incumbent
- Assumed office 1 November 2021
- Preceded by: Ulrich Markurth

Personal details
- Born: 1982 (age 43–44)
- Party: Social Democratic Party (since 1999)

Thorsten Kornblum (born 1982) is a German politician serving as mayor of Braunschweig since 2021. He has served as president of the Verband kommunaler Unternehmen since 2026. He has been a member of the SPD Party Executive Committee since 2025.
