= Greiz II =

Electoral constituency in Thuringia, Germany

Greiz II is one of 44 electoral constituencies (German: Wahlkreise) represented in the Landtag of Thuringia, which usually has twice as many members, 88.

Each constituency elects one member via first-past-the-post voting (first vote, or direct vote), while others may get elected via their state-wide party list. This second vote, or party vote, is more significant as it determines the party proportions and majorities in the parliament, thus the number of members of each party, while the first vote only has some influence on which persons from a major party are elected. It is insignificant to small parties, most of them don't bother to run a direct candidate unless he holds a high and relatively "safe" rank on the state-wide party list from which the additional 44 members are selected.

Under the current constituency numbering system, it is designated as constituency 40 of 44. It covers the eastern part of the district of Greiz.

Greiz II was created for the 1994 state election. Since 2014, it has been represented by Christian Tischner of the Christian Democratic Union (CDU). Several other candidates also became member of the state parliament via their party list, like Heike Taubert (SPD), member of the left-wing coalition state government since 2014.

== Geography ==
As of the 2019 state election, Greiz II covers the eastern part of the district of Greiz, specifically the municipalities of Berga/Elster, Bethenhausen, Brahmenau, Braunichswalde, Endschütz, Gauern, Greiz, Großenstein, Hilbersdorf, Hirschfeld, Kauern, Korbußen, Linda b. Weida, Mohlsdorf-Teichwolframsdorf, Neumühle/Elster, Paitzdorf, Pölzig, Reichstädt, Ronneburg, Rückersdorf, Schwaara, Seelingstädt, Teichwitz, and Wünschendorf/Elster.

== Members ==
The constituency has been held by the Christian Democratic Union (CDU) since its creation in 1994. Its first representative was Horst Krauße, who served from 1994 to 2014. Since 2014, it has been represented by Christian Tischner.

Election	Member	Party	%
1994	Horst Krauße	CDU	42.6
1999	Horst Krauße	CDU	48.1
2004	Horst Krauße	CDU	43.1
2009	Horst Krauße	CDU	29.9
2014	Christian Tischner	CDU	34.7
2019	Christian Tischner	CDU	30.4
2024	Christian Tischner	CDU	43.0

== Election results ==
=== 2024 election ===
The 2024 Thuringian state election on September 1 was different for Greiz II district due to the first time candidacy of Björn Höcke, leader of the Alternative for Germany (AfD) in Thuringia, and arguably its most controversial figure nation-wide. Also, the leading party in the state, The Left (Germany), had split up in winter, creating Bündnis Sahra Wagenknecht (BSW).

Since 2014, Höcke ran twice in Eichsfeld I, a catholic region with a firm CDU 50+% majority, and became member of state parliament due to his high and "safe" position on the AfD party list, number 1. Due to these lists, even the top figures of small 5+% parties will become parliament members, without running in a district, or doing there very poorly. On the other hand, if a party wins many constituencies, but ends up with popular vote to low to back them up, no seat might be assigned via list, and party leaders might be left out if they were not among the winners in a district. In fact, the CDU in 2019 had won nearly half of all districts, 21, but their third place popular vote of 21.7% would earn them only 20 seats in a 88 seat parliament, which was enlarged to 90 to accommodate 21 CDU seats. The AfD had won 23.4% of the popular vote, and 22 of 90 seats, eleven each direct and from list.

The growing success of the AfD, which became the leading party in polls, but due to more than two parties being involved at only 30+%, thus might have led to the strange case of leading AfD politicians not making the parliament any-more via list, only if they win a district. The same scenario traditionally applies to the leading party in Bavaria, the CSU. Höcke thus looked for a district with better chances, and was nominated in Greiz II. As it turned out, in 2024 the AfD came in first with 32.8% of the popular vote, 32 of 88 seats, 29 direct, and three from the list, for Höcke and two others.

State election (2024): Greiz II
Notes:	Blue background denotes the winner of the electorate vote. Pink background denotes a candidate elected from their party list. Yellow background denotes an electorate win by a list member, or other incumbent. A ✓ or ✗ denotes status of any incumbent, win or lose respectively.						
Party	Candidate	Votes	%	±%	Party votes	%	±%
AfD	Björn Höcke	10,362	38.9	▲13.6	9,941	37.1	▲11.1
CDU	✓ Christian Tischner	11,437	43.0	▲12.6	7,265	27.1	▲2.6
BSW	—				4,076	15.2	▲15.2
Left	Leon Maximilian Walter	1,995	7.5	▼12.1	2,846	10.6	▼17.4
SPD	Heike Taubert	2,345	8.8	▼4.9	1,034	3.9	▼4.3
Greens	—			▼3.2	361	1.3	▼1.7
FDP	Gernot Sengewald	484	1.8	▼3.7	283	1.0	▼4.0
Other parties					989	3.7	
Informal votes		435			263		
Total valid votes		26,623			26,795		
Turnout		27,058	75.1	▲9.3			
CDU hold	Majority	3.879	4.1	▼1.0			

=== 2019 election ===
State election (2019): Greiz II
Notes:	Blue background denotes the winner of the electorate vote. Pink background denotes a candidate elected from their party list. Yellow background denotes an electorate win by a list member, or other incumbent. A ✓ or ✗ denotes status of any incumbent, win or lose respectively.						
Party	Candidate	Votes	%	±%	Party votes	%	±%
CDU	✓ Christian Tischner	7,558	30.4	▼4.3	6,097	24.5	▼10.3
AfD	Sigvald Hahn	6,306	25.3	▲13.0	6,468	26.0	▲13.3
Left	Frank Tempel	4,869	19.6	▼2.6	6,982	28.0	▲3.1
SPD	Heike Taubert	3,401	13.7	▼7.9	2,050	8.2	▼7.0
FDP	Jens Meyer	1,358	5.5	▲2.8	1,262	5.1	▲2.7
Greens	Katja Grunert	793	3.2	▲0.6	752	3.0	▼0.5
Independent	Detlef Zietan	566	2.3				
MLPD	Adrian Manuel Mauson	41	0.2		63	0.3	
List-only parties					1,233	5.0	
Informal votes		327			312		
Total valid votes		24,892			24,907		
Turnout		25,219	65.8	▲10.0			
CDU hold	Majority	1,252	5.1	▼7.4			

=== 2014 election ===
State election (2014): Greiz II
Notes:	Blue background denotes the winner of the electorate vote. Pink background denotes a candidate elected from their party list. Yellow background denotes an electorate win by a list member, or other incumbent. A ✓ or ✗ denotes status of any incumbent, win or lose respectively.						
Party	Candidate	Votes	%	±%	Party votes	%	±%
CDU	Christian Tischner	8,016	34.7	▲4.6	8,050	34.8	▼0.6
Left	Holger Steiniger	5,135	22.2	▼1.0	5,769	24.9	▲0.1
SPD	Heike Taubert	4,988	21.6	▼3.8	3,516	15.2	▼4.0
AfD	Bärbel Kowsky	2,851	12.3		2,932	12.7	
NPD	David Köckert	892	3.9	▼0.8	1,011	4.4	▲0.2
FDP	Jens Meyer	619	2.7	▼10.0	552	2.4	▼6.5
Greens	Martin Kleinsteuber	602	2.6	▼1.2	799	3.5	▼0.9
List-only parties					523	2.3	
Informal votes		418			369		
Total valid votes		23,103			23,152		
Turnout		23,521	55.8	▼0.8			
CDU hold	Majority	2,891	12.5	▲7.8			

=== 2009 election ===
State election (2009): Greiz II
Notes:	Blue background denotes the winner of the electorate vote. Pink background denotes a candidate elected from their party list. Yellow background denotes an electorate win by a list member, or other incumbent. A ✓ or ✗ denotes status of any incumbent, win or lose respectively.						
Party	Candidate	Votes	%	±%	Party votes	%	±%
CDU	✓ Horst Krauße	7,233	29.9	▼13.2	8,643	35.6	▼10.4
SPD	Heike Taubert	6,274	26.0	▲4.2	4,698	19.4	▲3.4
Left	Diana Skibbe	5,520	22.9	▼3.2	5,958	24.6	▲1.6
FDP	Wilhelm Wüstner	3,081	12.8	▲7.1	2,136	8.8	▲5.2
NPD	Norman Wilkens	1,140	4.7		1,019	4.2	▲2.6
Greens	Johannes Möstl	909	3.8	▲0.6	1,064	4.4	▲1.2
List-only parties					746	3.1	
Informal votes		599			492		
Total valid votes		24,157			24,264		
Turnout		24,756	56.9	▲3.4			
CDU hold	Majority	959	3.9	▼13.1			

=== 2004 election ===
State election (2004): Greiz II
Notes:	Blue background denotes the winner of the electorate vote. Pink background denotes a candidate elected from their party list. Yellow background denotes an electorate win by a list member, or other incumbent. A ✓ or ✗ denotes status of any incumbent, win or lose respectively.						
Party	Candidate	Votes	%	±%	Party votes	%	±%
CDU	✓ Horst Krauße	9,986	43.1	▼5.0	10,779	46.0	▼6.0
PDS	Diana Skibbe	6,038	26.1	▲5.3	5,402	23.0	▲3.8
SPD	Heike Taubert	5,048	21.8	▼4.3	3,752	16.0	▼4.2
FDP	Horst Gerber	1,323	5.7	▲3.7	839	3.6	▲2.7
Greens	Till Hafner	752	3.2		739	3.2	▲2.0
List-only parties					1,946	8.3	
Informal votes		1,404			1,094		
Total valid votes		23,147			23,457		
Turnout		24,551	53.5	▼4.9			
CDU hold	Majority	3,948	17.0	▼5.0			

=== 1999 election ===
State election (1999): Greiz II
Notes:	Blue background denotes the winner of the electorate vote. Pink background denotes a candidate elected from their party list. Yellow background denotes an electorate win by a list member, or other incumbent. A ✓ or ✗ denotes status of any incumbent, win or lose respectively.						
Party	Candidate	Votes	%	±%	Party votes	%	±%
CDU	✓ Horst Krauße	13,158	48.1	▲5.5	14,303	52.0	▲7.4
SPD	Harald Seidel	7,144	26.1	▼9.5	5,544	20.2	▼11.3
PDS	Bernd Grimm	5,690	20.8	▲7.8	5,268	19.2	▲5.8
REP	Harald Seeger	820	3.0		363	1.3	▼0.2
FDP	Hanno Sengewald	548	2.0	▼1.3	252	0.9	▼2.0
List-only parties					1,479	5.4	
Informal votes		628			479		
Total valid votes		27,360			27,509		
Turnout		27,988	58.4	▼16.1			
CDU hold	Majority	6,014	22.0	▲15.0			

=== 1994 election ===
State election (1994): Greiz II
Notes:	Blue background denotes the winner of the electorate vote. Pink background denotes a candidate elected from their party list. Yellow background denotes an electorate win by a list member, or other incumbent. A ✓ or ✗ denotes status of any incumbent, win or lose respectively.						
Party	Candidate	Votes	%	±%	Party votes	%	±%
CDU	Horst Krauße	15,191	42.6		16,092	44.8	
SPD		12,712	35.6		11,334	31.5	
PDS		4,586	12.9		4,773	13.3	
Greens		2,009	5.6		1,456	4.1	
FDP		1,182	3.3		1,028	2.9	
List-only parties					1,263	3.5	
Informal votes		1,235			969		
Total valid votes		35,680			35,946		
Turnout		36,915	74.5				
CDU win new seat	Majority	2,479	7.0				
