= Anke Erdmann =

German politician (born 1972)

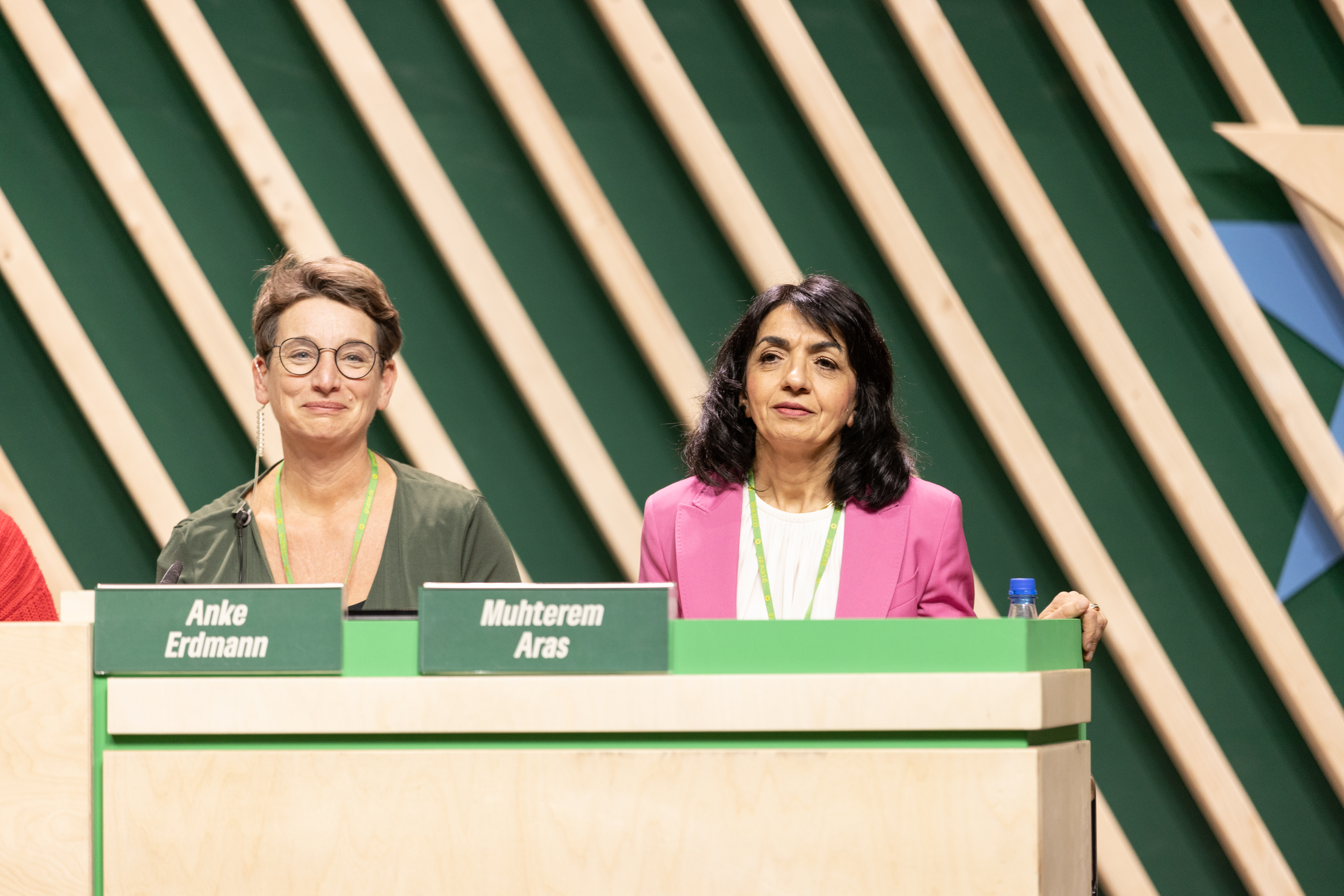
- Erdmann in 2023

Member of the Landtag of Schleswig-Holstein
- In office 27 October 2009 – 6 June 2017

Personal details
- Born: 30 May 1972 (age 53)
- Party: Alliance 90/The Greens
- Spouse: Ulf Kämpfer

Anke Erdmann (born 30 May 1972) is a German politician. From 2009 to 2017, she was a member of the Landtag of Schleswig-Holstein. From 2022 to 2025, she served as co-chair of Alliance 90/The Greens in Schleswig-Holstein.
