= Albrecht Schütte =

German politician (born 1970)

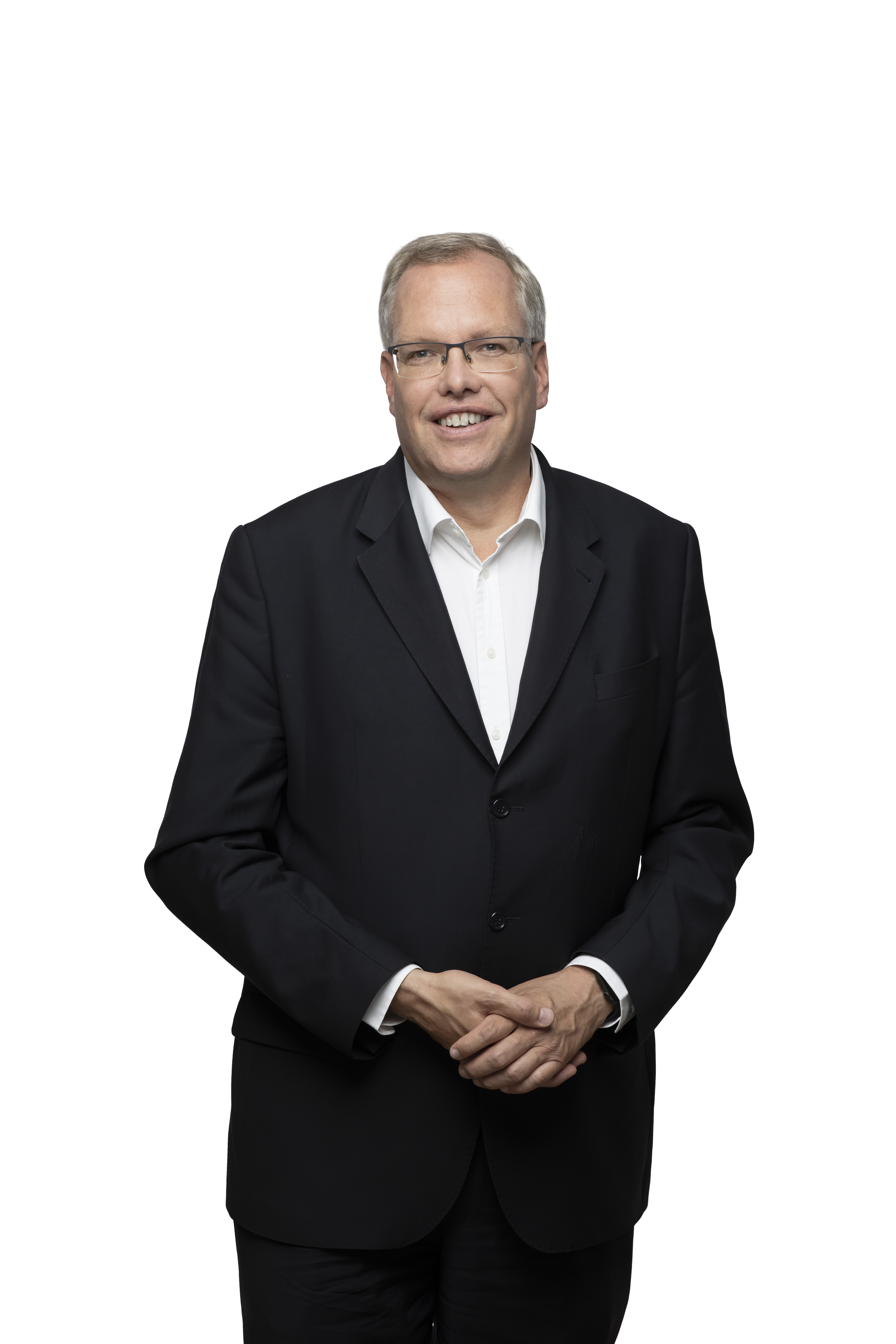
- Schütte in 2020

Member of the Landtag of Baden-Württemberg
- Incumbent
- Assumed office 5 April 2016

Personal details
- Born: 20 December 1970 (age 55) Heidelberg
- Party: Christian Democratic Union (since 1999)

Albrecht Schütte (born 20 December 1970 in Heidelberg) is a German politician serving as a member of the Landtag of Baden-Württemberg since 2016. He has served as treasurer of the Christian Democratic Union in the Rhein-Neckar-Kreis since 2009.

In the negotiations to form a coalition government under the leadership of Cem Özdemir following the 2026 state elections in Baden-Württemberg, Schütte co-chaired the working group on internal affairs, alongside Danyal Bayaz.
