= Malte Spitz =

German politician

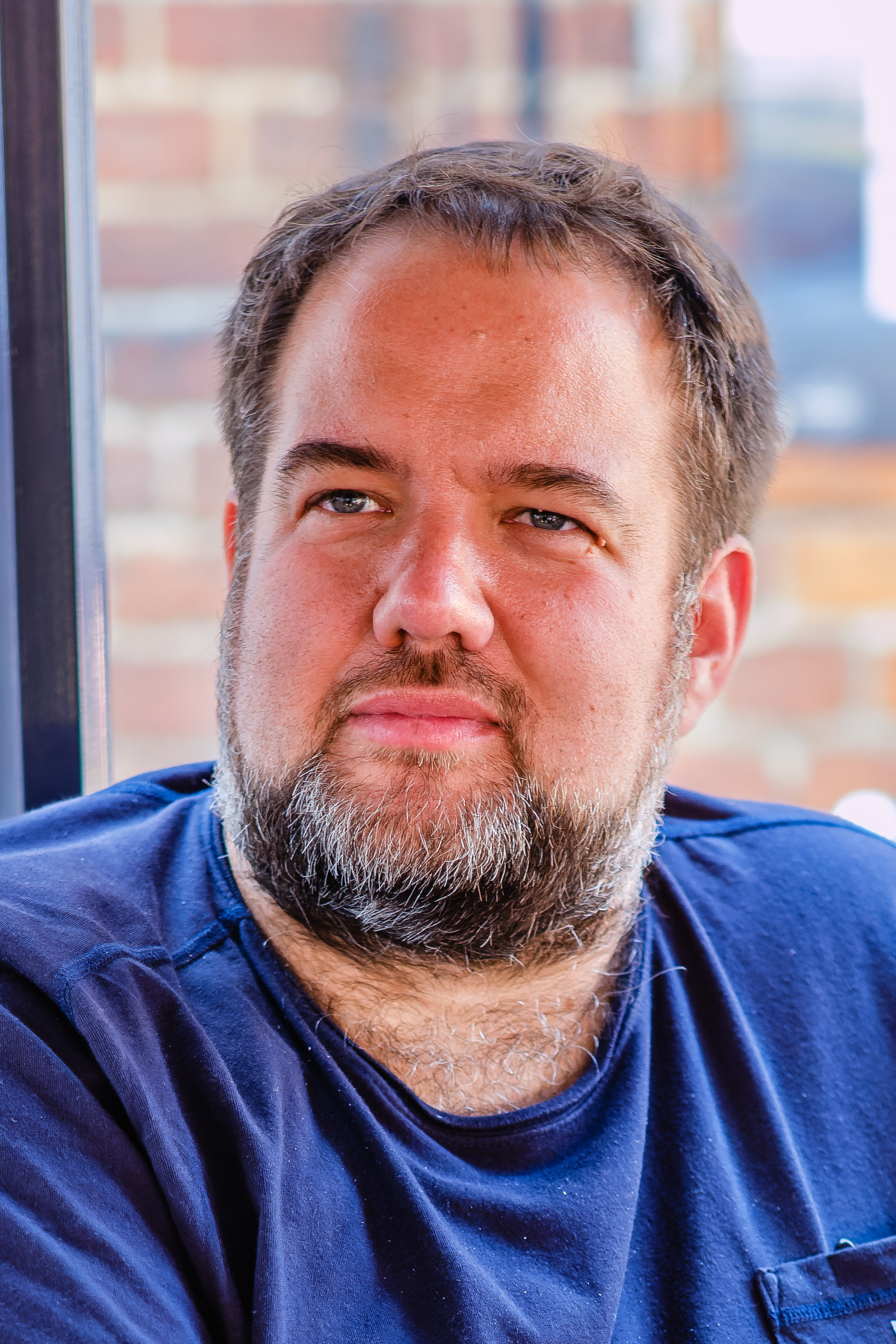
Malte Spitz in 2023

Malte Spitz (born 14 April 1984) is a German Alliance 90/The Greens politician and executive committee member. He works on media and privacy issues.

Spitz served as the federal political director of the Green Youth from 2004 to 2006. From 2006 to 2013, he was a member of the federal executive board of the Green Party, and a member of the party council from 2013 to 2022. Spitz was a candidate for the Bundestag in the September 2013 national election in Germany. From June 2014 to May 2016, he was a member of the state executive board of the Green Party in North Rhine-Westphalia. Since May 2022, he has been a member of the National Regulatory Control Council, appointed by President Steinmeier.

He is known for suing T-Mobile for collecting metadata. He is a TED Speaker and founded the Society for Civil Rights, which focuses on strategic human rights litigation.

== Education ==
According to his own accounts, Spitz obtained his Realschulabschluss leaving certificate in 2000, then spent a year as an exchange student at a high school in Tomball, Texas. Upon his return to Germany, he completed his Abitur at the Collegium Johanneum. In 2003, he moved to Berlin and began studying economics at Humboldt University.

== Party Roles ==
Spitz joined the Green Youth and Alliance 90/The Greens in 2001. From May 2004 to November 2006, he served as the Green Youth's federal political director. At the federal delegates conference in Cologne on December 2, 2006, he was elected as a member of the federal executive board of Alliance 90/The Greens, beating future Federal Minister of Economics Robert Habeck. In November 2008, he was confirmed in office at the federal delegates' conference in Erfurt, winning a contested vote against Melanie Schnatsmeyer. In November 2010, at the delegates' conference in Freiburg, he won a contested election against Stephan Schilling, a former Green Youth spokesperson. Upon his third re-election in 2012 in Hanover, 84 percent of the party conference delegates voted for Spitz.

Spitz ran as the candidate for Alliance 90/The Greens in the Unna I constituency for the 2013 federal election, and was placed 16th on the party's state list in North Rhine-Westphalia. In the constituency, he secured the third-best result with 5.6% of the vote, trailing the candidates from the SPD and CDU. As the North Rhine-Westphalia state branch of Alliance 90/The Greens won only 13 seats via the state list, his 16th-place ranking was insufficient for him to enter the Bundestag.

Following Alliance 90/The Greens' defeat in the 2013 election, Spitz announced he would not run again for the federal executive board. At one point, he was considered a potential successor to Steffi Lemke as the federal party secretary. However, Spitz announced he would forgo this candidacy to have more time for his family and studies in the future. Instead, he successfully ran for the party council 5 times in succession.

At the state party in Siegburg in June 2014, Spitz was elected as a member of the executive board of the North Rhine-Westphalia state chapter.

Spitz is a co-author of the Green Men's Manifesto.

Spitz led the 2021 coalition negotiations for Alliance 90/The Greens in the areas of digital innovations and digital infrastructure.

== Internet Policy and Civil Rights ==
Spitz helped to build the Fairsharing network, which advocated for a flat-rate fee model for copyright violations (rather than a percentage of sales fine), and has served as one of their spokespersons. He was also the founder of the "Pro Net Neutrality" initiative in 2010 in Germany, which advocates for the legal enshrining of net neutrality.

In the summer of 2009, Spitz sued the mobile network operator T-Mobile to obtain his stored data, and subsequently made that data available to the newspaper Die Zeit in February 2011. The publication of this data was awarded the Grimme Online Award by the Grimme Institute for the Special category. Visualizations of this retained data also won a Gold LeadAward from the Lead-Academy for "Web Special of the year," as well as an Online Journalism Award in the category "Outstanding Informational Graphic or Data Visualization, Professional" from the Online News Association.

== Published Books ==
- Daten – das Öl des 21. Jahrhunderts? Nachhaltigkeit im digitalen Zeitalter. (Translated title: Data – the Oil of the 21st Century? Sustainability in the Digital Age.) Hoffmann und Campe, Hamburg 2017, ISBN 978-3-455-00030-6.
- with Brigitte Biermann: Was macht ihr mit meinen Daten? (Translated title: What Are You Doing With My Data?) Hoffmann und Campe, Hamburg 2014, ISBN 978-3-455-50328-9.

== Personal life ==
Spitz lives in Berlin, and is married to fellow Greens politician Silke Gebel.
