= Christian Tischner =

German politician (born 1981)

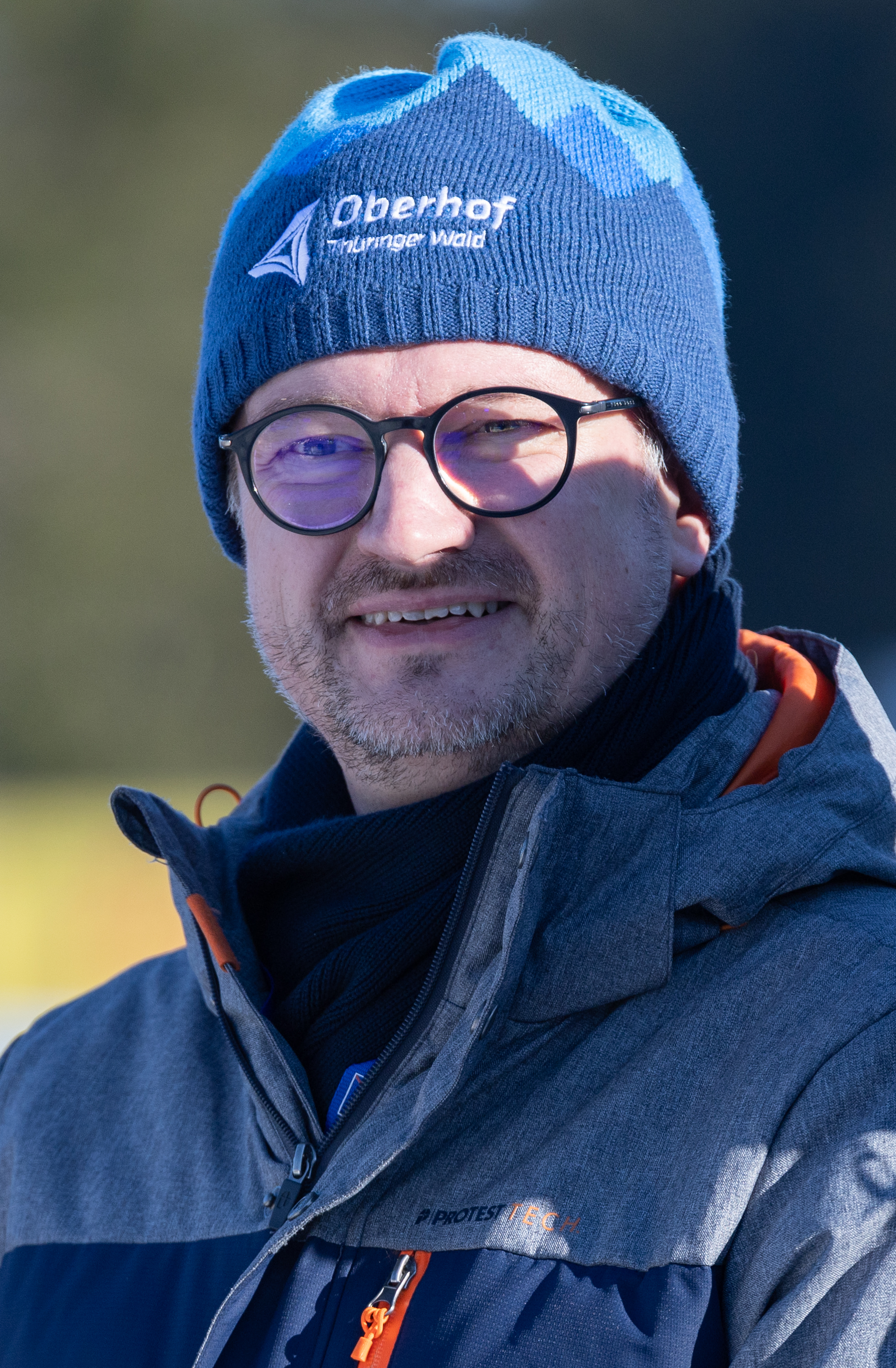
Christian Tischner (2026)

Christian K. Tischner (born 18 August 1981 in Greiz) is a German politician from the Christian Democratic Union of Germany (CDU) who has been a member of the Landtag of Thuringia since 2014. Since 2024, he has been the Thuringian Minister for Education, Science and Culture in the Voigt cabinet.

== Life and education ==
Tischner was born in Greiz and graduated from the vocational high school in Greiz in 1998 with a secondary school leaving certificate (Realschulabschluss ) and in 2001 with a business-oriented university entrance qualification (Abitur) in 2001. From 2001 to 2006, he studied history and political science for secondary school teaching at the Friedrich Schiller University of Jena and the Martin Luther University Halle-Wittenberg. After passing his first state examination in 2006, he began his teaching traineeship at the Greiz State High School, which he completed in 2008 with his second state examination. He then worked at the same school as a history and social studies teacher until 2010.

Alongside his work as a teacher, he was a research assistant at the Chair of Political Didactics at Friedrich Schiller University Jena from 2008. In 2010, he served as the organizational head of the Chair of Political Education there for one year. From 2010 to 2012, Tischner was a doctoral scholarship recipient of the Konrad Adenauer Foundation, and from 2011 to 2016, he was a lecturer at the Center for Key Qualifications at the University of Passau. In 2012, he became a lecturer at the Institute of Political Science at the University of Jena, and from 2012 to 2013, he was a university lecturer at the Chair of Political Science and its Didactics at the University of Bremen. In 2013, he returned to teaching at the Adolf Reichwein Cooperative Comprehensive School in Jena.

Tischner is the author of essays and books on various political didactics and historical topics.

Christian Tischner is Protestant, married, and lives in Greiz. He has two children.

=== Voluntary engagement ===
Tischner has been the state chairman of the German War Graves Commission (Volksbund Deutsche Kriegsgräberfürsorge e.V.) in Thuringia since 2024. Since 2018, he has been chairman of the Friends of the Vogtland Philharmonie Greiz Reichenbach (Förderverein der Vogtlandphilharmonie Greiz-Reichenbach e.V.). He is also a board member of the Greiz District Sports Association (Kreissportbund Greiz e.V.), the Seminar for Political Education and Information (Seminar für politische Bildung und Information e.V.), the German Association for Political Education (Deutsche Vereinigung für politische Bildung e.V.) , the Lebenshilfe Greiz (Lebenshilfe Greiz e.V.), and the Greiz Theater Festival (Greizer Theaterherbst e.V.).

== Politics ==
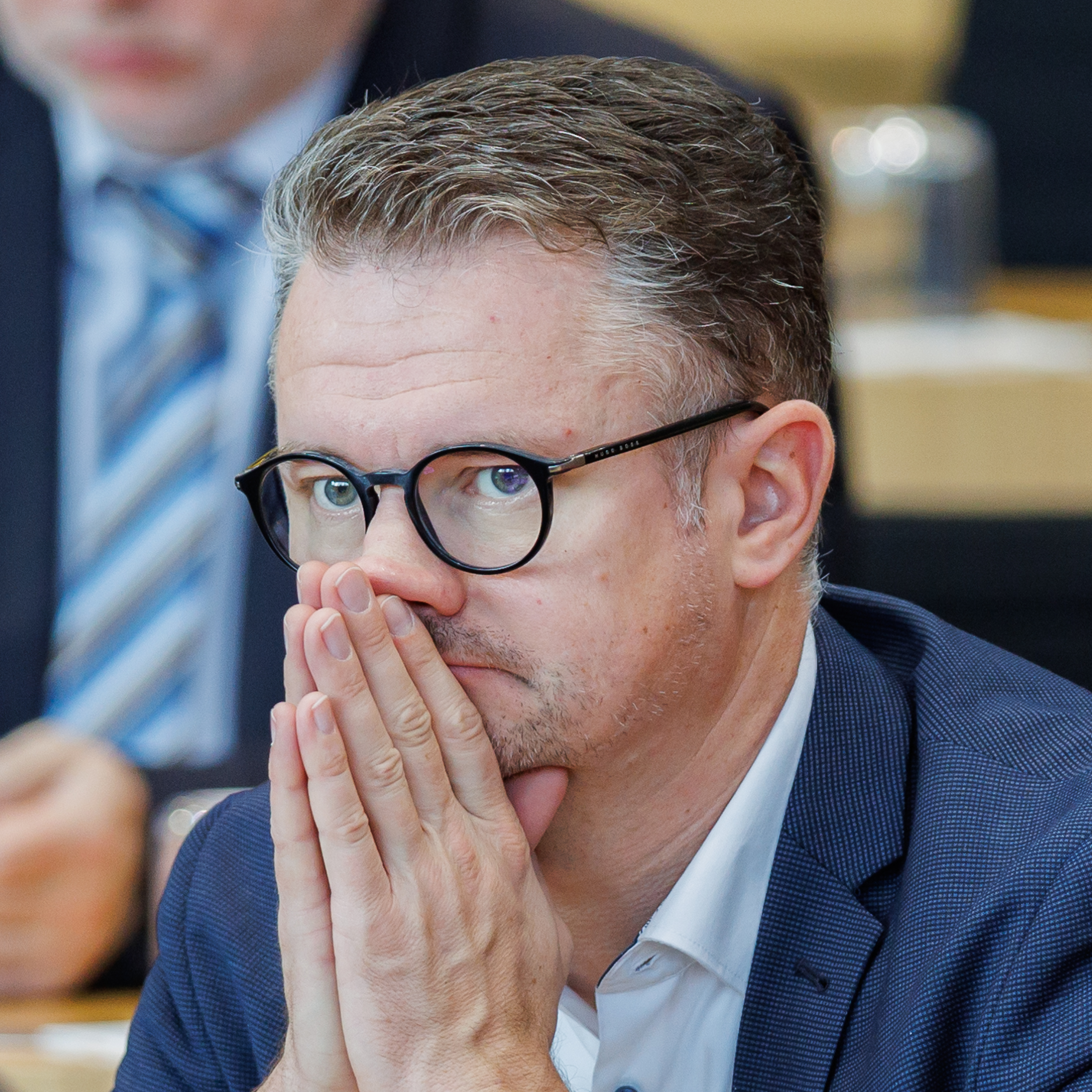
Tischner in the Landtag (2024)

Tischner joined the CDU in 1997. In 2004, he became a member of the Greiz city council and was elected chairman of the tourism, culture, and social affairs committee; since 2014, he has been chairman of the CDU city council group. In 2009, he was also elected to the Greiz district council. Within his party, he has been a member of the CDU district executive committee in the Greiz district since 1999. He has also been honorary chairman of the district branch of the Young Union since 2009.

In the 2014 Thuringian state election, Tischner won the direct mandate for the CDU in the Greiz II constituency and was thus elected to the Thuringian Landtag for the first time. During this legislative period, he was a member and chairman of the inquiry commission on "Racism and Discrimination" (2017–2019), a member of the Inquiry Commissions on the "Dieter Lauinger Affair" (2017–2019) and the "Immelborn Files Depot" (2015–2017), as well as on the board of trustees of the Thuringian Volunteer Foundation (2014–2019), the State Sports Conference (2014–2019), and the Prison Commission (2014–2019).

In 2019 and 2024 he again won the direct mandate in the Greiz II. constituency. There he is a member of the Committee on Education, Youth and Sport, the Committee on Economic Affairs, Science and Digital Society, and the Friends of Israel Association. Tischner is also the education and science policy spokesperson for his CDU parliamentary group. From 2020 to 2024, Christian Tischner was deputy chairman of the CDU parliamentary group in the state parliament.

Tischner is chairman of the board of trustees of the Thuringian State Center for Political Education. He has been a member of the Thuringian State Science Conference since 2023.

Since 2022, Tischner has been a member of the Federal Expert Commission “Ascent” for the development of the basic program of the CDU of Germany, and since 2023 chairman of the commission “Strong Children. Good Future.”

On 13 December 2024, Tischner was appointed Thuringian Minister for Education, Science and Culture in the Voigt cabinet.

== Publications ==
- Politik & Co., Lehrerhandreichung – Sozialkunde für das Gymnasium Thüringen, hg. v. Hartwig Riedel, C.C. Buchner Verlag Bamberg – diverse Ausgaben 2012 bis 2020
- Planspiel Kommunalpolitik: „Ein neues Theater- & Veranstaltungshaus für Greiz!?“ – Ein Planspiel zur Kommunalpolitik – zugleich Muster für andere konkrete Anwendungen, Didaktischer Koffer, Universität Halle 2009.
- Politische Reden. Eine Erscheinungsform der politischen Kultur, in: Carl Deichmann / Ingo Juchler (Hrsg.): Politik verstehen lernen. Zugänge zum Politikunterricht, Wochenschau Verlag, Schwalbach/Ts. 2010, S. 67–75; Politische Reden: Beispiele für die Unterrichtspraxis, S. 120–131.
- Planspiel Kommunalpolitik. Soziales Handeln und Kommunalpolitik verstehen durch Planspiele, in: GWP 3/2010, S. 391–405.
- Stimmt die Richtung? Politische Bildung im Sinne des Lebenslangen Lernens, in: Andreas Eis, Torsten Oppelland, Christian K. Tischner (Hrsg.): Politische Kultur und politische Bildung. Festschrift für Carl Deichmann, Wochenschau Verlag, Schwalbach/Ts. 2011, S. 197–210.
- Wandlungsprozesse: von der DDR zur Bundesrepublik. Politik verstehen: Behandlung von Biographien und politischen Reden (gemeinsam mit Carl Deichmann), in: Dirk Lange (Hrsg.): Entgrenzungen. Gesellschaftlicher Wandel und politische Bildung, VSVerlag, Wiesbaden 2011, S. 190–198.
- Das Bundesverfassungsgericht. Hüter der Verfassung oder politischer Konkurrent? In: Thomas Goll (Hrsg.): Anspruch und Realität des Grundgesetzes. Themen und Materialien, Bundeszentrale für politische Bildung, Bonn 2013, S. 223–232; Materialien für Lehrende, S. 233–260. (inkl. DVD)
- (Hrsg. mit Carl Deichmann): Handbuch Dimensionen und Ansätze der politischen Bildung, Wochenschau Verlag, Schwalbach/Ts. 2013. ISBN 978-3-89974-817-8.
  - Der handlungsorientierte Ansatz, in: Handbuch Dimensionen und Ansätze der politischen Bildung, S. 57–71.
  - Mediale Erscheinungsformen politischer Kultur, in: Handbuch Dimensionen und Ansätze der politischen Bildung, S. 218–239.
- Erscheinungsformen politischer Kultur als projektorientierter Ansatz des lebenslangen politischen Lernens, in: Ingo Juchler (Hrsg.).: Projekte in der politischen Bildung, Bundeszentrale für politische Bildung, Bonn 2013, S. 57–71.
- (Hrsg. mit Carl Deichmann): Handbuch Fächerübergreifender Unterricht in der politischen Bildung, Wochenschau Verlag, Schwalbach/Ts. 2014. ISBN 978-3-89974-827-7.
  - Geschichtsunterricht und Politikunterricht, in: Handbuch Fächerübergreifender Unterricht in der politischen Bildung, S. 73–90.
- Der Thüringer Landtag. Lernmaterial für die Sekundarstufen I und II, hg. v. Thüringer Landtag, Erfurt 2017. (Konzeption und Mitautor)
- Greiz in den Jahren des Ersten Weltkrieges, in: Schneider, Volkmar (Hrsg.). Greizer Heimatkalender 2017, Greiz 2017, S. 131–142.
- Aufstände und Missverständnisse – Unruhige und blutige Märztage in der Region Greiz 1920, in: Schneider, Volkmar (Hrsg.): Greizer Heimatkalender 2020, Greiz 2020, S. 131–142.
- Historische Reden im Geschichtsunterricht, 2. Aufl., Wochenschau Verlag, Schwalbach/Ts. 2020. ISBN 978-3-89974-373-9.
- Rhetorik und Geschichte, in: Vadim Oswalt / Hans-Jürgen Pandel (Hrsg.): Handbuch Geschichtskultur, Wochenschau Verlag, Schwalbach/Ts. 2021, S. 164–201.
