= Silke Gebel =

German politician (born 1983)

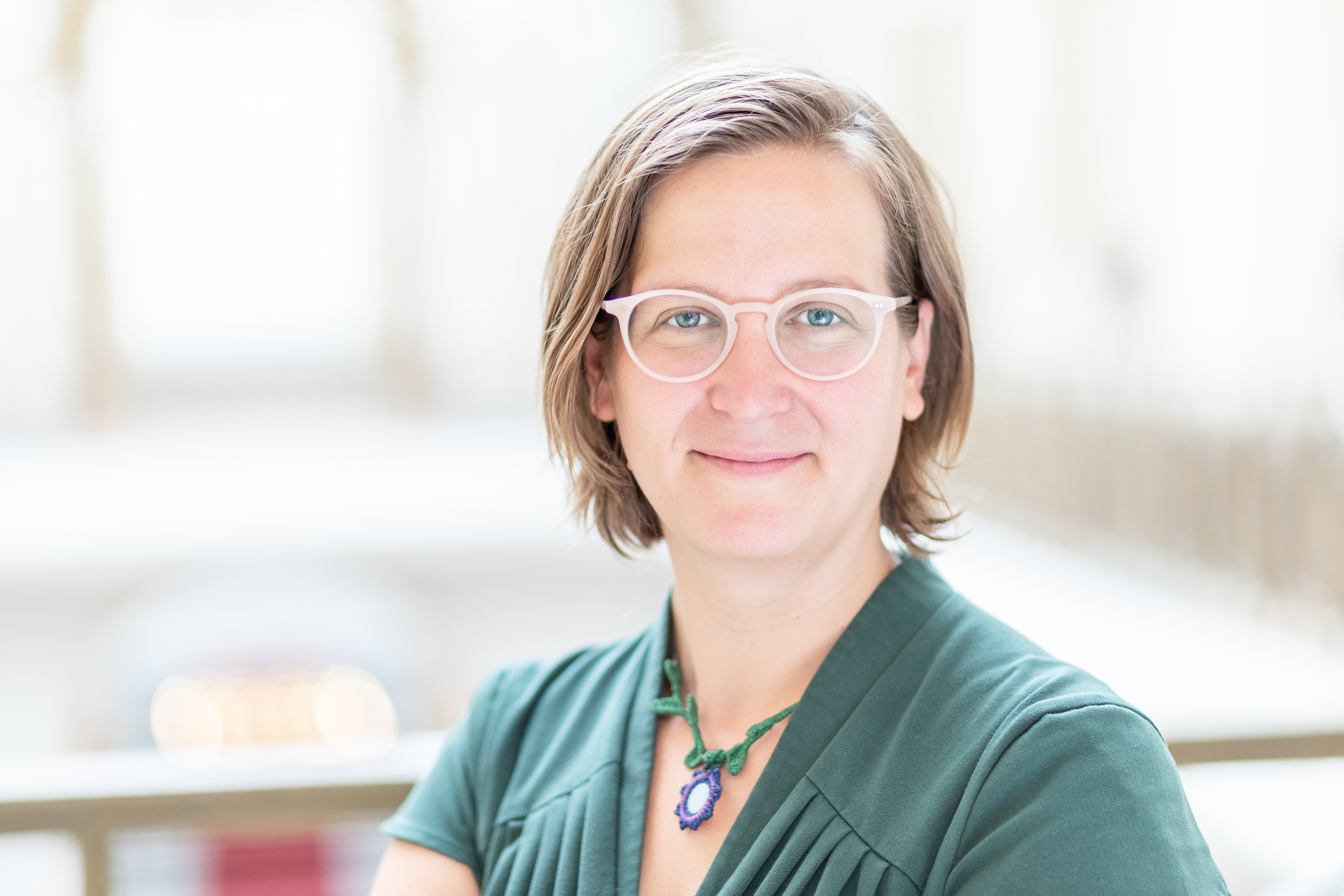
- Gebel in 2019

Leader of Alliance 90/The Greens in the Abgeordnetenhaus of Berlin
- Incumbent
- Assumed office 13 December 2016 Serving with Antje Kapek (until Mar 2022); Werner Graf (since Mar 2022)
- Preceded by: Ramona Pop

Member of the Abgeordnetenhaus of Berlin
- Incumbent
- Assumed office 2 January 2013
- Preceded by: Felicitas Kubala

Personal details
- Born: Silke Gebel; 27 July 1983 (age 43) Ostfildern, Baden-Württemberg, West Germany
- Party: Alliance 90/The Greens
- Education: University of Göttingen; University of Potsdam

Silke Gebel (born 27 July 1983) is a German politician of Alliance 90/The Greens. Since 2016, she has been co-chair of the Greens parliamentary group in the Abgeordnetenhaus of Berlin. She has been a member of the Abgeordnetenhaus since 2011.

== Education and personal life ==
After graduating from high school, Gebel studied administrative sciences at the University of Göttingen and University of Potsdam from 2002 to 2011, and finished her studies with a diploma in public administration theory. She was a student assistant of Kerstin Müller, member of the Bundestag, from 2006 to 2009, and then assistant of Reinhard Bütikofer, Member of the European Parliament, until 2011. She is married to fellow Green politician Malte Spitz, with whom she has three children. They live in Berlin-Mitte.

== Political career ==
Before becoming involved with the Greens, Gebel was active in the youth branch of the Europa-Union Deutschland from 2001. She was deputy federal chairwoman of the group from 2003 to 2006. From 2006 to 2008, Gebel was a member of the federal executive committee of the Green Youth, and for a time was its political director. She was the group's representative at the German National Committee for International Youth Work (DNK), and was spokesperson from 2008 to 2009.

Gebel has been a member of Alliance 90/The Greens since 2003. From 2003 to 2005, she was a member of the party district executive in Göttingen, and later moved to Berlin, where joined the district executive in Mitte in 2011.

Gebel was 27th on the Greens state list in the 2011 Berlin state election and was not elected to the Abgeordnetenhaus. She also ran in the Mitte 2 constituency, winning 15.5% of votes. After the resignation of Felicitas Kubala in January 2013, Gebel replaced her as member of the Abgeordnetenhaus. There, she joined the Urban Development and Environment Committee and the Europe, Federalism, and Media Committee. She also became spokeswoman for environmental policy for the Greens.

She was re-elected to the Abgeordnetenhaus in the 2016 Berlin state election. After Ramona Pop stepped down as co-leader of the Greens parliamentary group to join the second Müller senate, Gebel was elected as her successor on 2 November, alongside incumbent Antje Kapek.

Gebel was re-elected to the Abgeordnetenhaus in the 2021 Berlin state election, winning the direct constituency Mitte 1 with 35% of votes.

=== Political positions ===
Gebel opposes proposals for school teachers in Berlin to be employed as Beamter. She states that such an arrangement fails to recognize the importance of educators, social workers, and other non-academic professions who work alongside teachers, saying: "The modern classroom should be made up of multi-professional, diverse teams – Beamterisation creates an unnecessary imbalance." She described the debate as a distraction from ensuring successful education for children.

Silke Gebel is a member of the non-party organisation Europa-Union Berlin. Since November 2020, she has been a founding member and co-speaker of the EUB working group in the Abgeordnetenhaus.
