= Ulf Kämpfer =

German politician

The Honourable Ulf Kämpfer
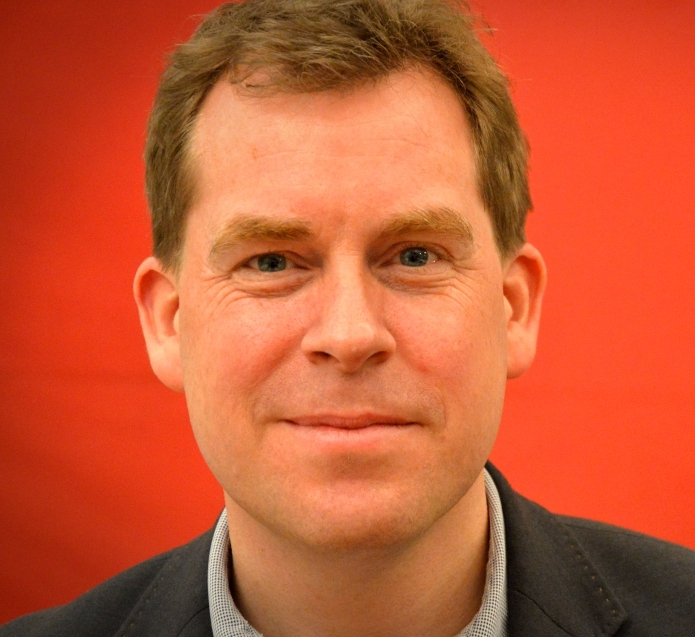
- Kämpfer in 2013

Lord Mayor of Kiel
- In office March 2014 – April 2026
- Preceded by: Peter Todeskino (Acting)
- Succeeded by: Samet Yılmaz

Personal details
- Born: 16 June 1972 (age 54) Eutin, West Germany
- Party: Social Democratic Party of Germany
- Spouse: Anke Erdmann
- Occupation: Politician

Ulf Kämpfer (born 16 June 1972) is a German politician of the Social Democratic Party of Germany (SPD) who has been serving as the Lord Mayor of Kiel since March 2014.

== Education and early career ==
Kämpfer was born Eutin, West Germany. After his graduation in Plön, he studied jurisprudence and philosophy at the University of Göttingen and the National University of Ireland in Galway. For two years, he worked as a research assistant in the German Bundestag. After further studies at Humboldt University in Berlin and Columbia University in New York City, he graduated with a doctorate in 2004 with his comparative law thesis Self-determination people wishing to die: Euthanasia in German and American Constitutional Law (German: Die Selbstbestimmung Sterbewilliger: Sterbehilfe im deutschen und amerikanischen Verfassungsrecht) in Berlin. At the same time, he passed the second state examination.

From 2004 to 2008, Kämpfer worked in the state ministries for environmental issues, agriculture and justice of Schleswig-Holstein. In 2008, he entered the judicial service and was appointed a judge of an Amtsgericht in Kiel in 2010. Prior to his appointment as Secretary of State in the cabinet of Minister-President Torsten Albig on 12 June 2012, he was also an associate to the Higher Regional Court of Schleswig.

== Political career ==
From 2012 to 2014, Kämpfer served as State Secretary in the State Ministry of Energy Transition, Agriculture, Environment and Rural Areas of Schleswig-Holstein, under the leadership of minister Robert Habeck.

Following the resignation of Susanne Gaschke for the selection committee of the SPD, Greens, and the South Schleswig Voters' Association, on 20 November 2013, Kämpfer was proposed as a candidate for the office of mayor in Kiel. General meetings of the three parties agreed on 14 December 2013. At the general meeting of the SPD, he was chosen with three abstentions and no votes against. The Greens and the SSW elected him unanimously with no abstentions and votes against. On 23 March 2014, he was elected with 63.1% of the vote as new mayor of Kiel.

== Other activities ==
- Förde Sparkasse, Ex-Officio Chairman of the Supervisory Board
- Kiel Week, Ex-Officio Chairman of the Supervisory Board
- MVV Energie, Member of the Advisory Board
- Stadtwerke Kiel, Member of the Advisory Board

== Personal life ==
Kämpfer lives with his wife, Green politician Anke Erdmann, and their son in the Hassee district of Kiel.
