= Martin Huber =

German politician (born 1977)

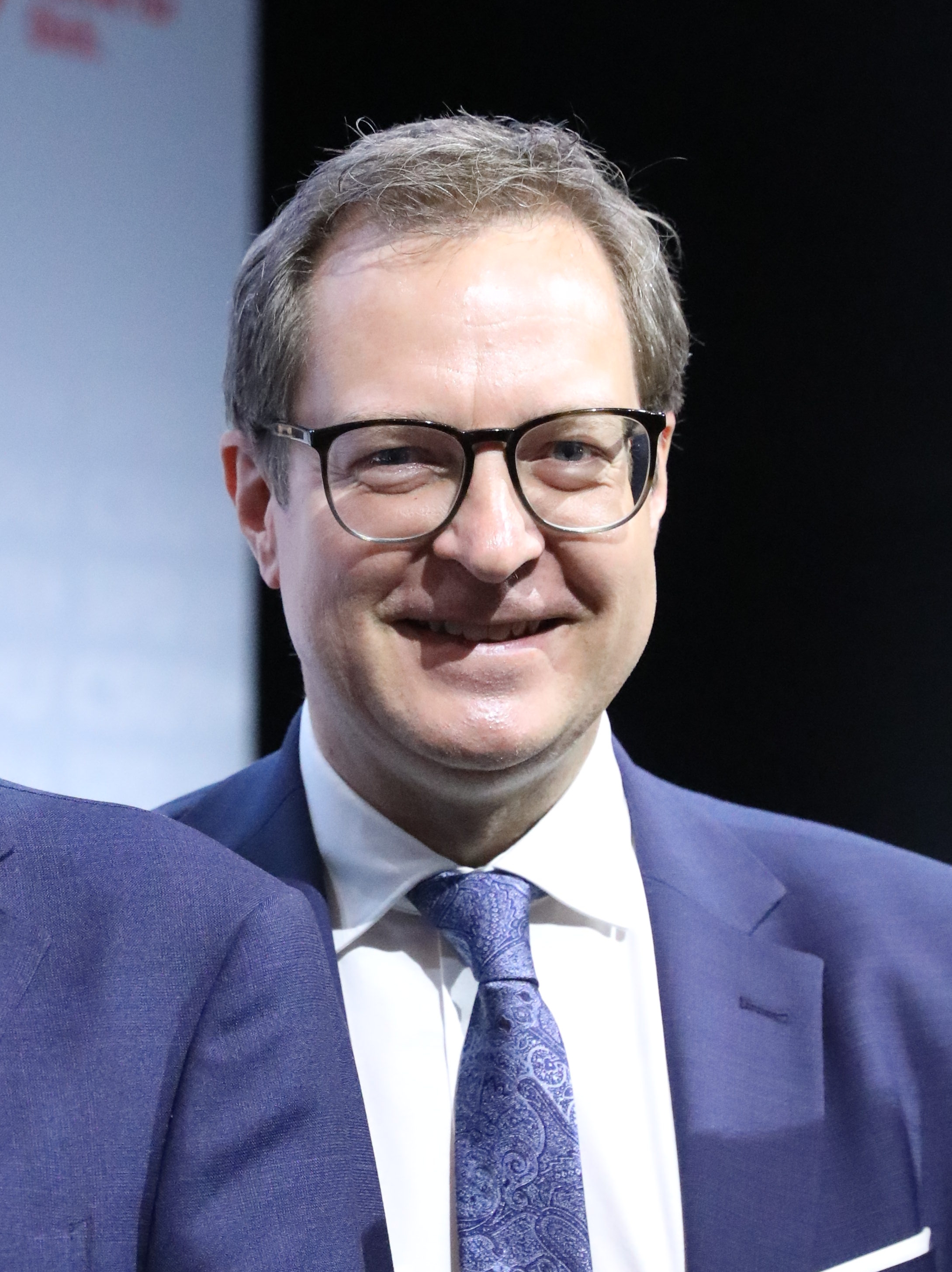
- Huber in 2025

Member of the Landtag of Bavaria
- Incumbent
- Assumed office 7 October 2013
- Constituency: Altötting (2018–present)

Personal details
- Born: 16 November 1977 (age 48)
- Party: Christian Social Union (since 1995)

Martin Andreas Huber (born 16 November 1977) is a German politician serving as a member of the Landtag of Bavaria since 2013. He has served as secretary general of the Christian Social Union since 2022.
