= Alexander Vogt =

German politician (born 1978)

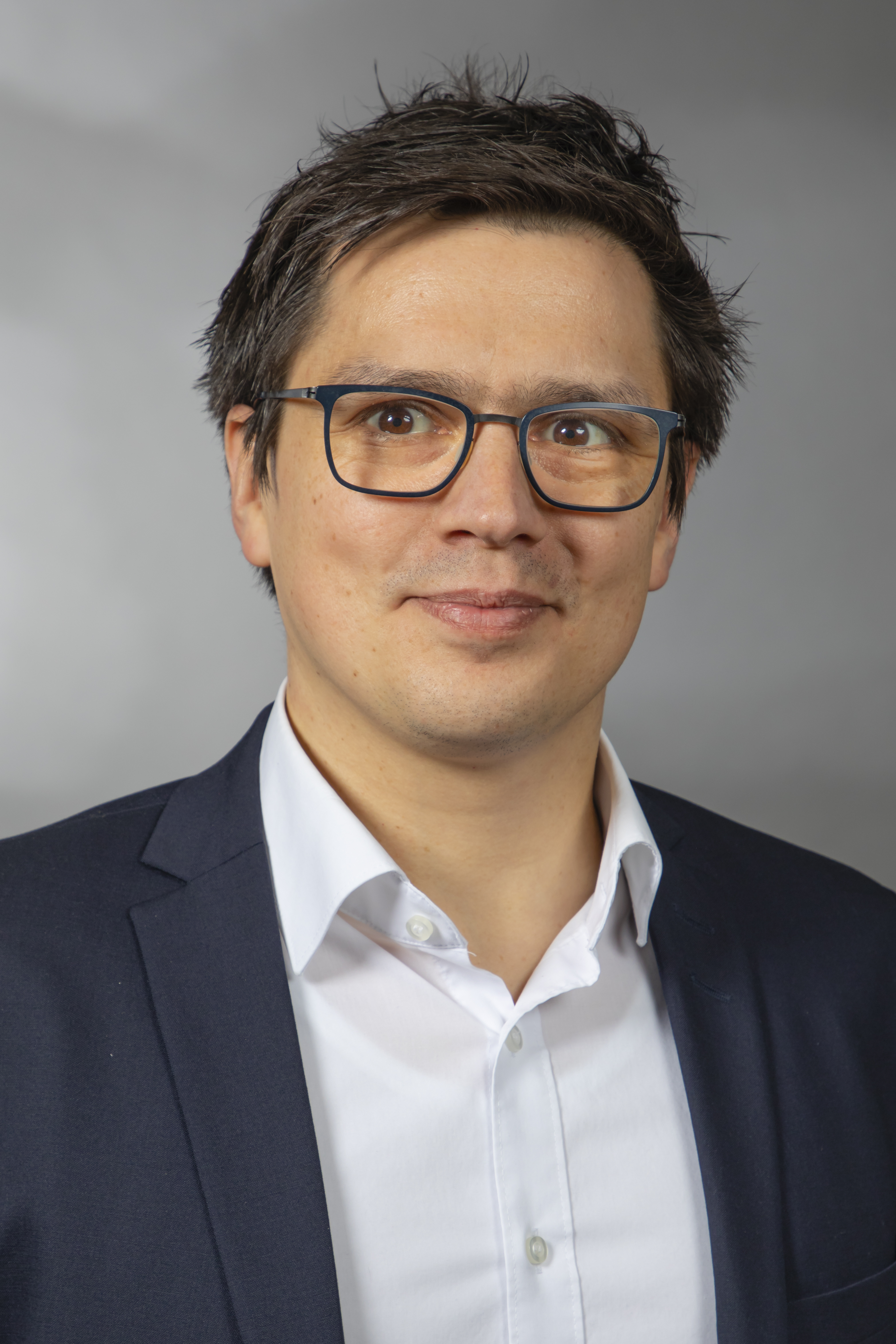
- Vogt in 2019

Member of the Landtag of North Rhine-Westphalia
- Incumbent
- Assumed office 9 June 2010
- Preceded by: Frank Sichau
- Constituency: Herne

Personal details
- Born: 21 December 1978 (age 47)
- Party: Social Democratic Party (since 1998)

Alexander Vogt (born 21 December 1978) is a German politician serving as a member of the Landtag of North Rhine-Westphalia since 2010. He has served as deputy group leader of Social Democratic Party since 2022.
