= Verband kommunaler Unternehmen =

Verband kommunaler Unternehmen e. V.
- Abbreviation: VKU
- Formation: 1949
- Founded at: Rüdesheim am Rhein
- Headquarters: Berlin
- Services: advocacy group representing municipally owned infrastructure undertakings and economic enterprises in Germany
- Members: 1484 member companies
- President: Michael Ebling
- CEO: Ingbert Liebing
- Staff: 120

Verband kommunaler Unternehmen, stands for the German Association of Local Public Utilities and is the national association of municipally-owned infrastructure undertakings in Germany. As an advocacy group, it represents the interests of its members towards legislators on state- federal- and European level. Its member companies are active in the fields of energy- and water supply, wastewater treatment, telecommunications, waste management and street cleaning.

== History ==
The VKU was founded in 1949 in Rüdesheim am Rhein. After the Second World War, the VKU supported municipal enterprises in their restructuring efforts. After the collapse of the GDR in 1989, the VKU aided local and regional authorities in Eastern Germany in reconstructing municipal energy and water supply infrastructure. In 2011 the formerly independent association for waste management and city cleaning (VKS – Verband kommunale Abfallwirtschaft und Stadtreinigung) became a department of VKU.

== The Association today ==
In 2019, the VKU had a total of 1484 member companies with a combined annual turnover of around 118 billion euros and around 268.000 employees. Their combined market shares in their areas of activity amounted to 61% for electricity, 66.7% for natural gas, 86.4% for drinking water, 70.2% for heat supply and 43.8% for wastewater disposal in 2019. Per day, the VKUs members dispose of 31.500 tons of municipal waste, making them decisive contributors to Germany's recycling quota of 68%, which is the highest among European Union member states. In addition, they supply over 6 million customers with broadband infrastructure.

The association itself is structured according to its member companies' fields of activity: The VKU has dedicated departments for energy, water and wastewater and telecommunications as well as waste collection, treatment and city cleaning. The core activity of the VKU concerns informing and influencing the legislative process by issuing press statements, formulating common positions for its members and advocating them towards decision-makers.

In 2007, the association moved its headquarters from Cologne to Berlin. In addition to its headquarters, the VKU operates country-level branches all over Germany as well as an office in Brussels. Since January 2016, the head mayor of Mainz, Michael Ebling, is President of the VKU. The operative business of the VKU is run by its managing director Ingbert Liebling, who was appointed in April 2020.

== VKU members in numbers ==
Annual turnover:	116.2 bn. €
Number of employees:	268.123
Annual investment	10 bn. €

Source: VKU
