= Delara Burkhardt =

German politician

Delara Burkhardt MEP
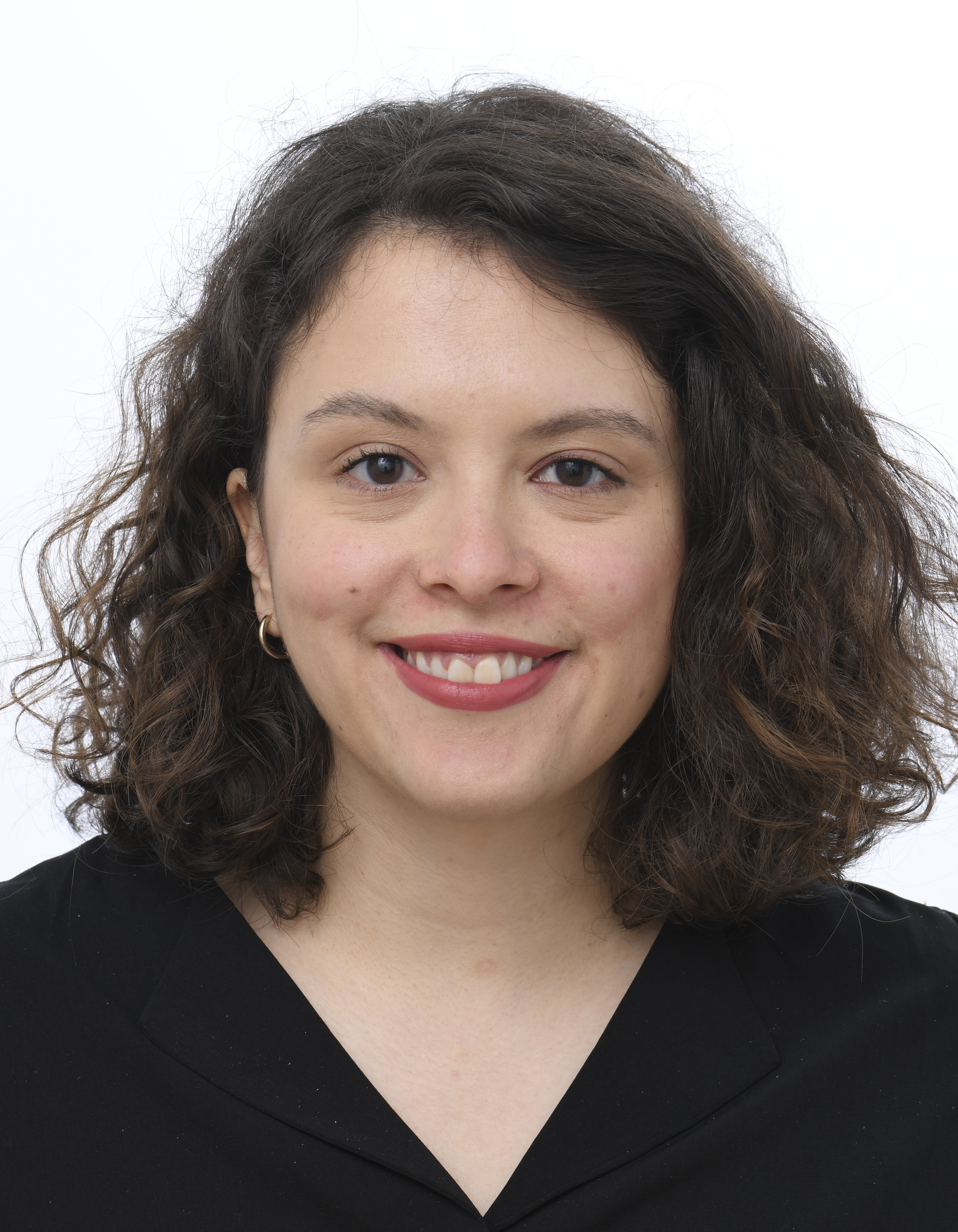
- Burkhardt in 2024

Member of the European Parliament for Germany

Personal details
- Born: 3 November 1992 (age 34) Hamburg, Germany
- Party: German: Social Democratic Party; EU: Party of European Socialists
- Education: University of Kiel

Delara Burkhardt is an Iranian-German politician of the Social Democratic Party (SPD) who has been serving as a Member of the European Parliament since 2019.

== Early life and education ==
Born to an Iranian mother and a German father in Hamburg, Burkhardt grew up in Siek, Holstein and studied political science at the University of Kiel from 2012 until 2016.

== Political career ==
In parliament, Burkhardt is a member of the European Parliament Committee on the Environment, Public Health and Food Safety.

In addition to her committee assignments, Burkhardt is part of the Spinelli Group, the European Parliament Intergroup on Anti-Racism and Diversity, the European Parliament Intergroup on Traditional Minorities, National Communities and Languages, the European Parliament Intergroup on LGBT Rights, the European Parliament Intergroup on Seas, Rivers, Islands and Coastal Areas, and of the Responsible Business Conduct Working Group.

On 4 February 2021 Burkhart took on a godparenthood for Katsyaryna Andreeva, Belarusian journalist and political prisoner.

In the negotiations to form a so-called traffic light coalition of the SPD, the Green Party and the Free Democratic Party (FDP) following the 2021 federal elections, Burkhardt was part of her party's delegation in the working group on climate protection and energy policy, co-chaired by Matthias Miersch, Oliver Krischer and Lukas Köhler.
