= Marco Mohrmann =

German politician (born 1973)

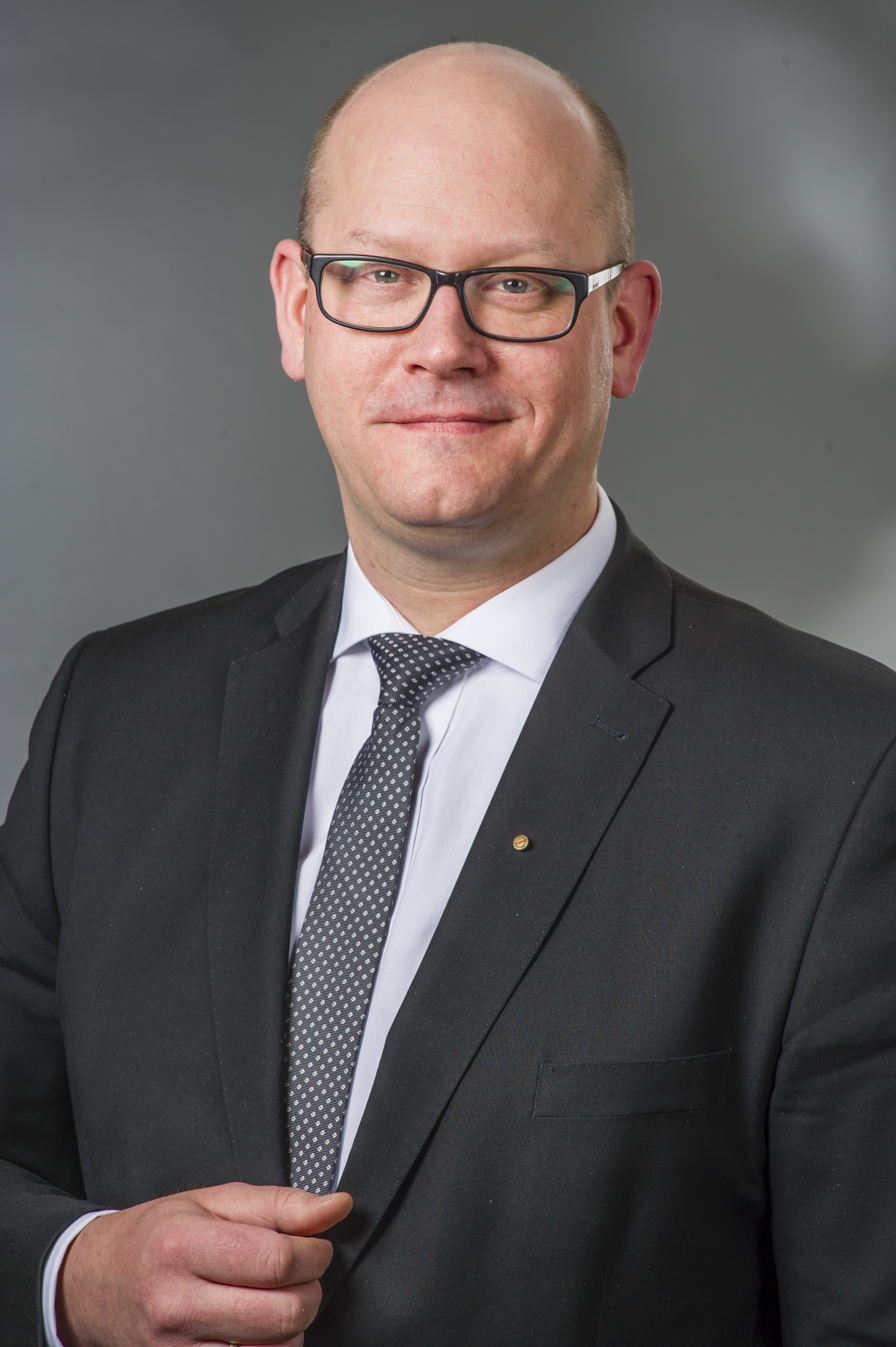
- Mohrmann in 2018

Member of the Landtag of Lower Saxony
- Incumbent
- Assumed office 14 November 2017
- Preceded by: Hans-Heinrich Ehlen
- Constituency: Bremervörde

Personal details
- Born: 7 September 1973 (age 52)
- Party: Christian Democratic Union (since 1990)

Marco Mohrmann (born 7 September 1973) is a German politician serving as a member of the Landtag of Lower Saxony since 2017. He has served as secretary general of the Christian Democratic Union in Lower Saxony since 2023.
