= Bettina Martin =

German politician (born 1966)

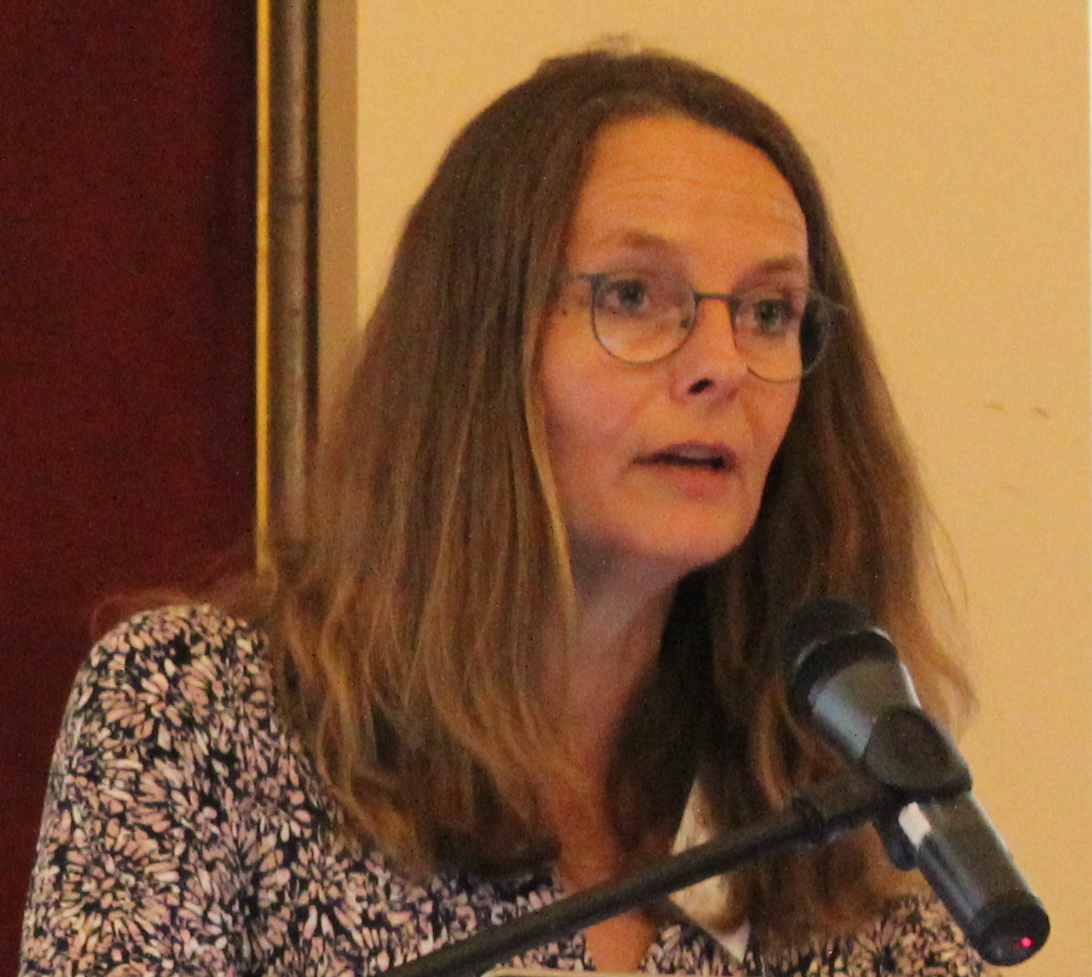
- Martin in 2019

Minister of Science, Culture, Federal and European Affairs of Mecklenburg-Vorpommern
- Incumbent
- Assumed office 15 November 2021
- Minister-President: Manuela Schwesig

Personal details
- Born: 19 March 1966 (age 60)
- Party: Social Democratic Party (since 1993)

Bettina Martin (née Girrbach; born 19 March 1966) is a German politician serving as minister of science, culture, federal and European affairs of Mecklenburg-Vorpommern since 2021. From 2019 to 2021, she served as minister of education, science and culture. She has been a member of the Landtag of Mecklenburg-Vorpommern since 2021.
