= List of German Green Party politicians =

A list of notable politicians of the Alliance 90/The Greens, the Green party of Germany:

== A ==
- Daniel Lede Abal
- Tim Achtermeyer
- Stephanie Aeffner
- Alaa Alhamwi
- Tarek Al-Wazir
- Jan Philipp Albrecht
- Elmar Altvater
- Carl Amery
- Luise Amtsberg
- Kerstin Andreae
- Rasmus Andresen
- Muhterem Aras
- Michael Arnold
- Ali Atalan
- Andreas Audretsch
- Maik Außendorf
- Berivan Aymaz

== B ==
- Tobias Bacherle
- Lisa Badum
- Karl Bär
- Annalena Baerbock
- Felix Banaszak
- Gert Bastian
- Margarete Bause
- Danyal Bayaz
- Canan Bayram
- Theresia Bauer
- Katharina Beck
- Marieluise Beck
- Volker Beck
- Angelika Beer (now PIRATEN)
- Cornelia Behm
- Dirk Behrendt
- Birgitt Bender
- Silvia Bender
- Matthias Berninger
- Ina Besche-Krastl
- Katharina Binz
- Angelika Birk
- Marianne Birthler
- Jakob Blasel
- Iris Blaul, de:Iris Blaul
- Michael Bloss
- Maryam Blumenthal
- Damian Boeselager
- Ann-Sophie Bohm-Eisenbrandt
- Alexander Bonde
- Tuba Bozkurt
- Franziska Brantner
- Bernhard Braun
- Wibke Brems
- Hiltrud Breyer
- Ulrich Briefs
- Ralf Briese
- Leonie Bronkalla
- Victoria Broßart
- Agnieszka Brugger
- Marianne Burkert-Eulitz
- Reinhard Bütikofer

== C ==
- Evrim Camuz
- Anna Cavazzini
- Sevim Çelebi-Gottschlich
- Anna Christmann
- Daniel Cohn-Bendit
- Michael Cramer
- Viola von Cramon-Taubadel

== D ==
- Rangin Dadfar Spanta
- Janosch Dahmen
- Sepp Daxenberger
- Max Deisenhofer
- Ekin Deligöz
- Anna Deparnay-Grunenberg
- Sandra Detzer
- Jeanne Dillschneider
- Katja Dörner
- Angela Dorn-Rancke
- Katharina Dröge

== E ==
- Harald Ebner
- Leon Eckert
- Katrin Eder
- Kurt Edler
- Pegah Edalatian
- Daniela Ehlers
- Ines Eichmüller
- Nina Eisenhardt
- Marcel Emmerich
- Stefan Engstfeld
- Gisela Erler
- Nargess Eskandari-Grünberg

== F ==
- Björn Fecker
- Katharina Fegebank
- Hans-Josef Fell
- Emilia Fester
- Andrea Fischer
- Joschka Fischer
- Simone Fischer
- Ossip K. Flechtheim
- Vasili Franco
- Romeo Franz
- Daniel Freund
- Ralf Fücks

== G ==
- Malte Gallée
- Anna Gallina
- Schahina Gambir
- Thomas Gambke
- Tessa Ganserer
- Matthias Gastel
- Silke Gebel
- Alexandra Geese
- Kai Gehring
- Stefan Gelbhaar
- Jan-Niclas Gesenhues
- Philmon Ghirmai
- Sven Giegold
- Christa Goetsch
- René Gögge
- Tobias Goldschmidt
- Katrin Göring-Eckardt
- Ulrike Gote
- Gabriele Gottwald
- Werner Graf
- Friedrich-Wilhelm Graefe zu Baringdorf
- Armin Grau
- Vanessa Gronemann
- Pascal Grothe
- Friedel Grützmacher
- Sabine Grützmacher
- Erhard Grundl
- Lena Gumnior
- Berat Gürbüz

== H ==
- Robert Habeck
- Gerald Häfner
- Enno Hagenah
- Henrike Hahn
- Anja Hajduk
- Julia Hamburg
- Rebecca Harms
- Oda Hassepaß
- Andreas Hartenfels
- Britta Haßelmann
- Martin Häusling
- Gerald Heere, de:Gerald Heere
- Gabriele Heinen-Kljajic
- Monika Heinold
- Brigitte Heinrich
- Sarah-Lee Heinrich
- Linda Heitmann
- Ursula Helmhold
- Dennis Helmich
- Kathrin Henneberger
- Bettina Herlitzius
- Bernhard Herrmann
- Clara Herrmann
- Winfried Hermann
- Antje Hermenau
- Pierrette Herzberger-Fofana
- Kurt Herzog
- Moritz Heuberger
- Maria Heubuch
- Oliver Hildenbrand
- Priska Hinz
- Bernhard Hoëcker
- Bettina Hoffmann
- Anton Hofreiter
- Bärbel Höhn
- Ottmar von Holtz
- Bruno Hönel
- Milan Horáček
- Sebastian Hüller
- Uwe Hüser

== J ==
- Michael Jacobi
- Dieter Janecek
- Bettina Jarasch
- Ulla Jelpke (now DIE LINKE)
- Julian-Béla Joswig

== K ==
- Lamya Kaddor
- Susanna Kahlefeld
- Gisela Kallenbach
- Antje Kapek
- Kirsten Kappert-Gonther
- Uwe Kekeritz
- Ska Keller
- Michael Kellner
- Petra Kelly
- Katja Keul
- Misbah Khan
- Memet Kiliç
- Sven-Christian Kindler
- Hans-Jürgen Klein
- Maria Klein-Schmeink
- Arndt Klocke
- Sibyll-Anka Klotz
- Hubertus Knabe
- Wilhelm Knabe
- Daniel Köbler
- Florian Kollmann
- Chantal Kopf
- Jan Koriath
- Robin Korte
- Ina Korter
- Georg Kössler
- Sylvia Kotting-Uhl
- Laura Kraft
- Philip Krämer
- Bruno Kramm
- Dominik Krause
- Wolfgang Kreissl-Dörfler
- Johannes Kretschmann
- Winfried Kretschmann
- Jürgen Kretz
- Oliver Krischer
- Louis Krüger
- Ole Krüger
- Agnes Krumwiede
- Franziska Krumwiede-Steiner
- Christian Kühn
- Stephan Kühn
- Fritz Kuhn
- Renate Künast
- Dieter Kunzelmann
- Markus Kurth

== L ==
- Sergey Lagodinsky
- Ricarda Lang
- Katrin Langensiepen
- Monika Lazar
- Sven Lehmann
- Eveline Lemke
- Steffi Lemke
- Vera Lengsfeld
- Rebecca Lenhard
- Eva Lettenbauer
- Anja Liebert
- Benjamin Limbach
- Helge Limburg
- Bea Lindhorst
- Tobias Lindner
- Madeleine Linke
- Karoline Linnert
- Corny Littmann
- Barbara Lochbihler
- Sylvia Löhrmann
- Denise Loop
- Manfred Lucha, de:Manfred Lucha
- Max Lucks
- Anna Lührmann
- Annemarie Lütkes
- Benedikt Lux

== M ==
- Alexander Maier (politician)
- Erik Marquardt
- Felix Martin
- Alfred Mechtersheimer
- Katja Meier
- Peter Meiwald
- Christin Melcher
- Susanne Menge
- Bithja Menzel
- Jens Metzger
- Christian Meyer (Bündnis 90/Die Grünen)
- Swantje Michaelsen
- Irene Mihalic
- Boris Mijatović
- Jerzy Montag
- Mehrdad Mostofizadeh
- Claudia Müller
- Henrike Müller
- Kerstin Müller
- Klaus Müller
- Sascha Müller
- Beate Müller-Gemmeke
- Marie Müser
- Özcan Mutlu

== N ==
- Winfried Nachtwei
- Árpád von Nahodyl
- Sara Nanni
- Ralf Nentwich
- Wolfgang Nešković
- Ingrid Nestle
- Luisa Neubauer
- Mona Neubaur
- Ehrhart Neubert
- Hannah Neumann
- Ophelia Nick
- Christa Nickels
- Niklas Nienaß
- Margarethe Nimsch, de:Margarethe Nimsch
- Omid Nouripour
- Konstantin von Notz

== O ==
- Jutta Oesterle-Schwerin
- Claus Offe
- Petra Olschowski
- Belit Onay
- Friedrich Ostendorff
- Verena Osgyan
- Karoline Otte
- Jan Ovelgönne
- Cem Özdemir

== P ==
- Julian Pahlke
- Boris Palmer
- Josefine Paul
- Jutta Paulus
- Lisa Paus
- Simone Peter
- Lasse Petersdotter
- Rupert von Plottnitz, de:Rupert von Plottnitz
- Filiz Polat
- Ramona Pop
- Gerd Poppe

== R ==
- Gerold Rahmann
- Benjamin Raschke
- Jürgen Reents
- Anja Reinalter
- Terry Reintke
- Johannes Remmel, de:Johannes Remmel
- Michael Röls-Leitmann
- Tabea Rößner
- Claudia Roth
- Manuela Rottmann
- Corinna Rüffer
- Heide Rühle
- Herbert Rusche
- Barbara Rütting

== S ==
- Michael Sacher
- Rüdiger Sagel
- Krista Sager
- Alexander Salomon
- Dieter Salomon
- Thomas von Sarnowski
- Manuel Sarrazin
- Jamila Schäfer
- Verena Schäffer
- Lukas Schauder
- Ulle Schauws
- Pia Schellhammer
- Gerhard Schick
- Bogusz Schmidt
- Frithjof Schmidt
- Stefan Schmidt
- Julia Schneider
- Pippa Schneider
- Silke Schneider
- Charlotte Schneidewind-Hartnagel
- Silvia Schön
- Marlene Schönberger
- Waltraud Schoppe
- Theresa Schopper, de:Theresa Schopper
- Michaele Schreyer
- Christina-Johanne Schröder
- Ilka Schröder
- Elisabeth Schroedter
- Franziska Schubert
- Stephanie Schuhknecht
- Werner Schulz
- Kordula Schulz-Asche
- Katharina Schulze
- Elina Schumacher
- Frank Schwalba-Hoth
- Melis Sekmen
- Anne Shepley
- Anja Siegesmund
- Florian Siekmann
- Christoph Sippel
- Edith Sitzmann
- Nyke Slawik
- Dennis Sonne
- Sarah Sorge
- Anne-Monika Spallek
- Merle Spellerberg
- Swantje Sperling
- Anne Spiegel
- Malte Spitz
- Grietje Staffelt
- Nina Stahr
- Claudia Stamm
- Miriam Staudte
- Till Steffen
- Barbara Steffens, de:Barbara Steffens
- Sandra Stein
- Charlotte Steinmetz
- Hanna Steinmüller
- Bernhard Stengele
- Silke Stokar von Neuforn
- Eckhard Stratmann-Mertens
- Wolfgang Strengmann-Kuhn
- Hans-Christian Ströbele
- Margit Stumpp
- Lisett Stuppy
- Aferdita Suka

== T ==
- Kassem Taher Saleh
- Wilfried Telkämper
- Harald Terpe
- Awet Tesfaiesus
- Maya Tischler
- Anjes Tjarks
- June Tomiak
- Antje Töpfer
- Aminata Touré
- Markus Tressel
- Jürgen Trittin
- Helga Trüpel
- Elke Twesten (now CDU)

== U ==
- Carl Wolmar Jakob von Uexküll
- Katrin Uhlig
- Wolfgang Ullmann
- Franz Untersteller

== V ==
- Julia Verlinden
- Jochen Vielhauer, de:Jochen Vielhauer
- Roland Vogt
- Sybille Volkholz
- Antje Vollmer

== W ==
- Niklas Wagener
- Robin Wagener
- Daniela Wagner
- Doris Wagner
- Johannes Wagner
- Catrin Wahlen
- Thekla Walker, de:Thekla Walker
- Beate Walter-Rosenheimer
- Kai Wargalla
- Nadja Weippert
- Saskia Weishaupt
- Jule Wenzel
- Stefan Wenzel
- Daniel Wesener
- Wolfgang Wetzel
- Valerie Wilms
- Heike Wilms-Kegel
- Josef Winkler
- Tina Winklmann
- Tonka Wojahn
- Harald Wolf
- Thomas Wüppesahl

== Z ==
- Petra Zais
- Gerhard Zickenheiner
