= Evrim =

Evrim is a Turkish given name for males or females. In Turkish, "Evrim" means "evolution".

== People ==
- Evrim Akyigit (born 1977), Turkish-born Dutch actress
- Evrim Camuz (born 1988), German politician
- Evrim Demirel (born 1977), Turkish composer and jazz pianist
- Ozan Evrim Özenç (born 1993), Turkish footballer
