= Krumwiede =

Krumwiede is a German surname. Notable people with the surname include:

- Agnes Krumwiede (born 1977), German pianist and politician
- Franziska Krumwiede-Steiner (born 1985), German politician

== Fictional characters ==
- Alan Krumwiede, patient in the 2011 film Contagion
