= Linke =

Linke is a German word meaning "left". It can refer to:

== Political parties ==
- Left (Austria), (German: Linke), a political party in Austria
- Die Linke, a political party in Germany

== People ==
- Armin Linke, Italian artist
- Barbara Linke, German-American mechanical engineer
- Bronisław Linke, Polish painter
- Carsten Linke, German football player
- Ed Linke, American baseball player
- Erika C. Linke, associate dean, Carnegie Mellon University Hunt Library
- Frank Linke-Crawford (1893–1918), Austro-Hungarian military aviator of mixed Austro-Polish (Galician) and British heritage
- Heiner Linke, physics professor at Lund University
- Kai Linke, German artist
- Madeleine Linke (born 1992), German politician
- Mariusz Linke, Polish-German professional grappler and mixed martial arts fighter
- Paul Linke, American actor
- Sebastjan Linke, Slovenian slalom canoer
- Susanne Linke, German choreographer
- Thomas Linke, German football player
- Uli Linke, American anthropologist
