= Deisenhofer =

Deisenhofer is a surname. Notable people with the surname include:

- Eduard Deisenhofer (1909-1945), German Waffen-SS officer and commander
- Johann Deisenhofer (born 1943), German biochemist
- Max Deisenhofer (born 1987), German politician
