= Gurbux =

Gurbux is a given name. Notable people with the name include:

- Gurbux Saini, Canadian politician
- Gurbux Singh (field hockey) (born 1936), Indian field hockey player
- Gurbux Singh (Brigadier) (c. 1916–2013), Indian military officer

== See also ==
- Gurbuz
