= Luhmann =

- Pronunciation: German: [ˈluːman] (Lühmann) [ˈlyːman]
- Language: German

Origin
- Language: Middle High German
- Origin: 1. Ludolf + mann 2. Ludwig + mann

Luhmann or Lühmann is a surname. Notable people with the name include:

- Heinrich Luhmann (1890–1978), German author who wrote about the Kirchhundem region
- Jörg Lühmann, German Green Party politician
- Kirsten Lühmann (born 1964), German politician
- Niklas Luhmann (1927–1998), German sociologist
- Wendy Luhmann, one of the 1982 doubles champions in the NCAA Women's Division II Tennis Championship

== See also ==
- 8808 Luhmann, an outer main-belt asteroid
