= Sippel =

Sippel is a surname. Notable people with the surname include:

- Birgit Sippel (born 1960), German politician and Member of the European Parliament from Germany
- Christoph Sippel (born 1997), German politician
- Jeffrey Sippel, American printmaker
- Lothar Sippel (born 1965), German football coach
- Peter Sippel (born 1969), German former football referee
- Rodney W. Sippel (born 1956), Chief Judge of the United States District
- Tobias Sippel (born 1988), German footballer
- Willi Sippel (born 1929), German former footballer

== See also ==
- Joe Sippel Weir, on Barambah Creek, west of Murgon, Queensland, Australia
