= Emilia Fester =

German politician (born 1998)

Emilia Fester MdB

Member of the Bundestag from Lower Saxony
- In office 1 January 2021 – 2025

Personal details
- Born: Emilia Johanna Fester; 28 April 1998 (age 28) Hildesheim, Lower Saxony, Germany
- Party: Alliance 90/The Greens
- Education: Churchill Academy and Sixth Form
- Occupation: Politician
- Website: Official website

Emilia "Milla" Johanna Fester MdB (German pronunciation: [feːstɐ]; born 28 April 1998) is a German politician of the Alliance 90/The Greens who served as a Member of the German Bundestag from 2021 to 2025.

== Early life and education ==
Fester was born 28 April 1998 in Hildesheim to Florian Brandhorst and Andrea Fester. Her parents were both actors and her mother also co-led the Center for Theater Pedagogics in Hildesheim.

She attended Robert-Bosch-Gesamtschule, a public school, graduating with her Abitur in 2017. Between 2014 and 2015, Fester completed an international student exchange, at Churchill Academy and Sixth Form in North Somerset, England. In 2017, she moved to Hamburg, where she applied to Hochschule für Musik und Theater (English: University of Applied Sciences for Theater and Music), but she was not admitted.

== Career ==
After not being admitted into college, Fester worked as an independent assistant director for the children and youth theater. Between 2018 and 2019 she worked as assistant director and stagehand at Deutsches Schauspielhaus.

== Politics ==
At age 23, Fester is the Baby of the House in the 20th Bundestag. She held this title until Emily Vontz entered the Bundestag in January 2023 succeeding Heiko Maas. She is her parliamentary group's spokesperson for youth issues.

== Personal life ==
In Berlin, Fester shared an apartment with fellow parliamentarians Marlene Schönberger and Saskia Weishaupt. On September 23, 2022, Fester made public that she is bisexual as the second member of the Bundestag, after Ricarda Lang.
