= Thomas Wüppesahl =

German politician

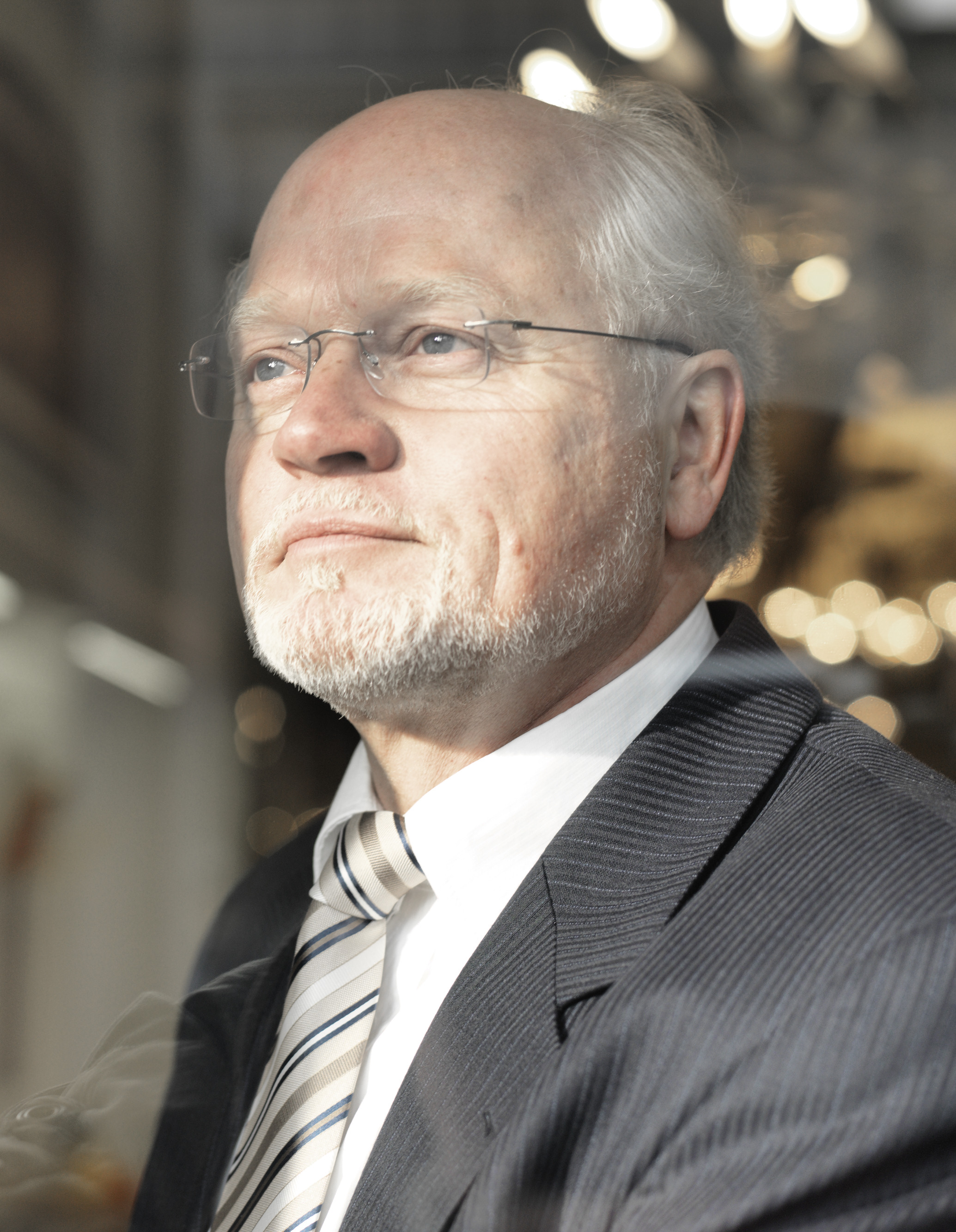

Member of the Bundestag
- In office 1987–1990

Personal details
- Born: 9 July 1955 (age 71) Hamburg, West Germany
- Party: Alliance '90/The Greens
- Education: Fachhochschule für Öffentliche Verwaltung Hamburg
- Occupation: Coach
- Profession: Criminalist
- Website: www.wueppesahl.de

Thomas Wüppesahl (born 9 July 1955) is a German politician. He is a former member of the Bundestag. He was a member of Alliance '90/The Greens until 1987. His political skills are civil and political rights, domestic policy and the anti-nuclear movement.

== Political career ==
Wüppesahl was a founder of a pressure group against Krümmel Nuclear Power Plant in Geesthacht 1975. In 1987 he became a member of the Bundestag in the Green Party faction. After leaving the party, he continued his mandate as an independent member of the parliament.

To establish his rights for working as a factionless member Wüppesahl launched and won a lawsuit basing on German constitution on the Federal Constitutional Court of Germany.

Wüppesahl was member of the Bundestag until the end of the 11th period in 1990. In 1990 he criticized the procedure of the German reunification gave no participation in the process to the population in Eastern Germany. Recordings and printed material show his presence and competence. Titanic Magazine dignified Wüppesahl 1991 as "the last parliamentarian". Having given 113 speeches Wüppesahl became the most active member of this period and one of the most active members ever. On the ceremonial act to the 60th anniversary of the Bundestag in 2009 Wüppesahl was introduced as the member of parliament who made copious use of the right of an independent parliamentarian to speak onto every agenda item of a sitting of the Bundestag.

== Life and profession ==
At age 16, in 1971 Wüppesahl joined the Hamburg Police. He studied at the Fachhochschule für öffentliche Verwaltung in Hamburg. His education was centered into white-collar crime. As a consequence of the mistreatment of demonstrators at the Hamburger Kessel in 1987 Wüppesahl and other police officers founded Hamburger Signal – Bundesarbeitsgemeinschaft kritischer Polizistinnen und Polizisten in Hamburg to support civil rights in police work.

In October 2004, Wüppesahl was arrested on information by a friend and accused of planning a bank robbery and murder. Wüppesahl argued his intention had been to uncover the former policeman observing him as an unofficial police spy what he was obviously. The courts found Wüppesahl guilty and sentenced him to 4 years and 6 months of prison. After being beaten into unconsciousness by unidentified perpetrators in November 2006 he was transferred from Justizvollzugsanstalt Billwerder in Hamburg to Justizvollzugsanstalt Tegel in Berlin. He was released in October 2007. Wüppesahl's complaint for rehabilitation on the European Court of Human Rights has not been decided yet.

Wüppesahl is now working as a qualified mediator and coach with a core on economical and political issues.

== Imtech ==
On 27 July 2013 Imtech announced that a criminalist officially named as "Mr. Y" had been consulted in 2011 to investigate the corruption in the reconstruction of the twin towers in Frankfurt. He identified more than he should; he warned the company in his final report in May 2011 about mafia structures and he charged the manager of the German subsidiary, Klaus Betz. Betz was covered by the company for two years. The investigator, identified by the Telegraaf as Thomas Wüppesahl, received a ban from Imtech 2011. When the corruption became known in spring 2013 the company lost a value of 1 billion Euros on the stock market.
