= Gurbuz =

Gurbuz or Gürbüz may refer to:

- Gürbüz Doğan Ekşioğlu (born 1954), Turkish cartoonist and graphics designer
- Gurbuz District, Khost Province, Afghanistan
- Gürbüz, Hani
- Berat Gürbüz (born 2002), German politician
