= Marlene Schönberger =

German politician (born 1990)

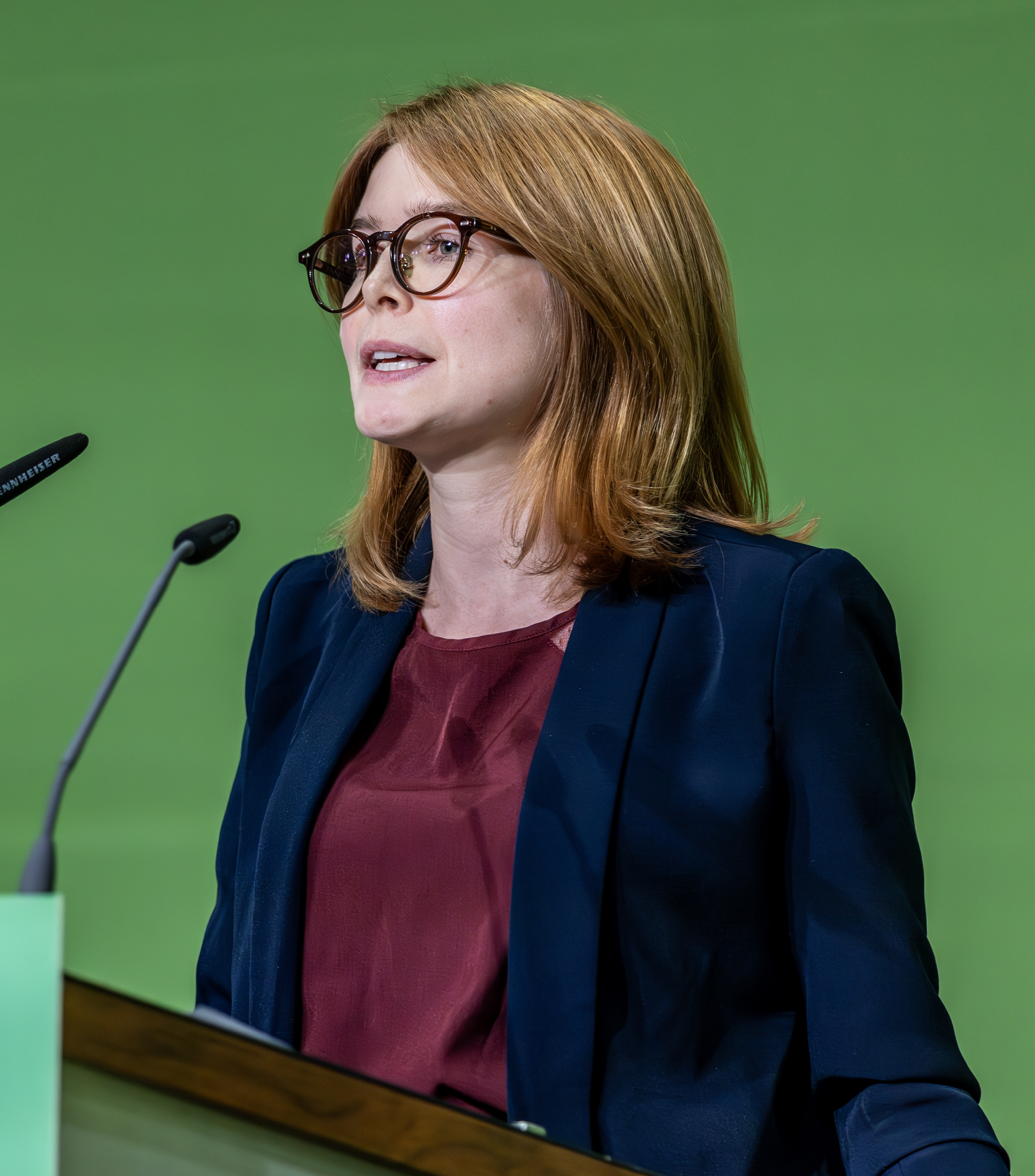

Member of the Bundestag
- Incumbent
- Assumed office 26 October 2021
- Constituency: Bavaria

Personal details
- Born: 6 December 1990 (age 35) Landshut, Germany
- Party: Alliance 90/The Greens
- Education: LMU Munich

Marlene Schönberger (born 6 December 1990) is a German politician of Alliance 90/The Greens who has been serving as a member of the Bundestag since the 2021 German federal election.

== Education ==
Schönberger holds a master's degree in political science from LMU Munich. Following her graduation in 2016, she worked as research assistant at the State Parliament of Bavaria (2018) and at LMU Munich (2018–2021).

== Political career ==
Schönberger joined the Green Party in 2010.

In parliament, Schönberger has been serving on the Committee on Education and Research.

== Other activities ==
- Federal Agency for Civic Education (BPB), Member of the Board of Trustees (since 2022)
- Education and Science Workers' Union (GEW), Member

== Personal life ==
In Berlin, Schönberger shares an apartment with fellow parliamentarians Emilia Fester and Saskia Weishaupt.
