= Gerold Rahmann =

German agricultural economist

Gerold Rahmann (born 29 April 1962 in Wittmund, Germany) is a German agricultural economist.

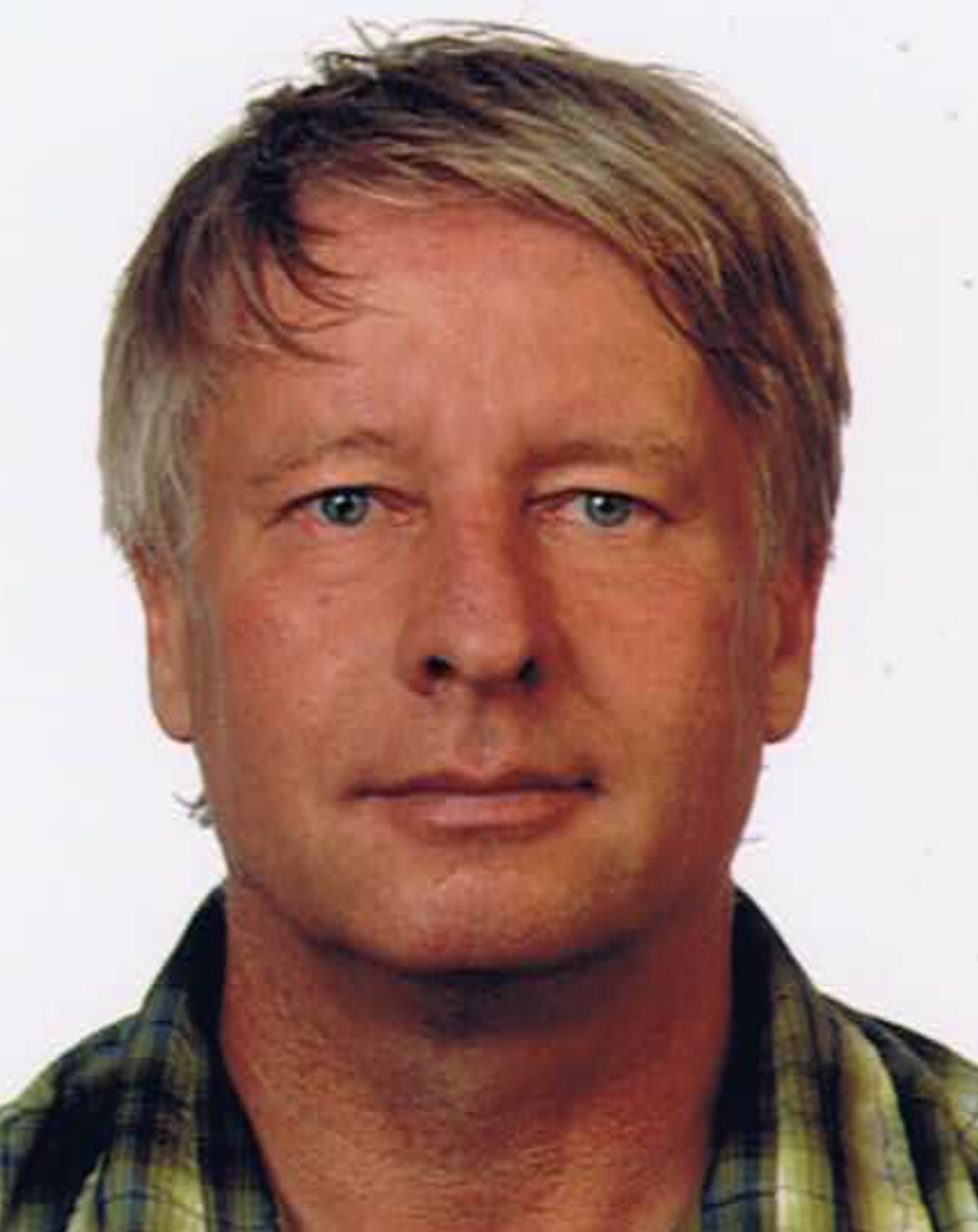

Rahmann was born on a small dairy farm in East Frisia, Germany. After highschool and civil service he studied agricultural economy at the University of Göttingen, Germany. From 1990 to 1993 he was scientist in the interdisciplinary project "Animal Husbandry in the Sahel - Recent situation and development. In 1993, he made his PhD in socioeconomics at the same university in the Institute of Rural Development. 1993 he moved to a post-doc position to the University of Kassel, the faculty of Organic Agricultural Research, and focused his work in the "Biotope management with Livestock in Europe. In 1999 he did his habilitation in this area at the University of Kassel, Germany. Since 2006 he is professor at the same faculty.

In 2000, Rahmann became founding director of the Federal Institute of Organic Farming at the German Federal Agricultural Research Centre (FAL). In 2007, the German federal agricultural research was reorganized and the FAL terminated. The Institute of Organic Farming was launched to the Research Centre of Rural Areas, Forestry and Fishery - the Thuenen-Institute - under the umbrella of the German Ministry of Nutrition and Agriculture (BMEL).

From 2015 to 2017, Rahmann took a long term leave to establish the Green Innovation Centre in Ethiopia, as part of the Special Initiative One World no Hunger, as global programme of the German Ministry of Economic Cooperation and Development (BMZ).

Besides the main job duties, Rahmann was voluntarily active in national and international organizations, mainly in the area of organic farming. 2014-2017 he was president of the International Society of Organic Farming Research (ISOFAR) and World Board of the International Federation of Organic Agricultural Movements (IFOAM). Since 2014, Rahmann is editor-in-chief of the scientific Journal of Organic Agriculture. He is associated editor of the scientific Journal of Applied Agriculture and Forestry Research.

In 1986, Rahmann became member of the German Green party and active in the counties of Göttingen (1989–2000) and Stormarn (2003–2018).
