= Sebastian Hüller =

German politician (born 2000)

Member of the Landtag of Mecklenburg-Vorpommern
- Incumbent
- Assumed office 20 October 2026

Personal details
- Born: 2000 (age 25–26)
- Party: Alliance 90/The Greens (since 2018)

Sebastian Hüller (born 2000) is a German politician who was elected member of the Landtag of Mecklenburg-Vorpommern in 2026. He has served as treasurer of Alliance 90/The Greens in Mecklenburg-Vorpommern since 2024.
