= Bithja Menzel =

German politician (born 1993)

Member of the Bürgerschaft of Bremen
- Incumbent
- Assumed office 8 June 2023

Personal details
- Born: 23 February 1993 (age 33) Kaltenkirchen
- Party: Alliance 90/The Greens

Bithja Menzel (born 23 February 1993 in Kaltenkirchen) is a German politician serving as a member of the Bürgerschaft of Bremen since 2023. From 2019 to 2023, she was a district councillor of Neustadt.
