= Lukas Schauder =

German politician (born 1997)

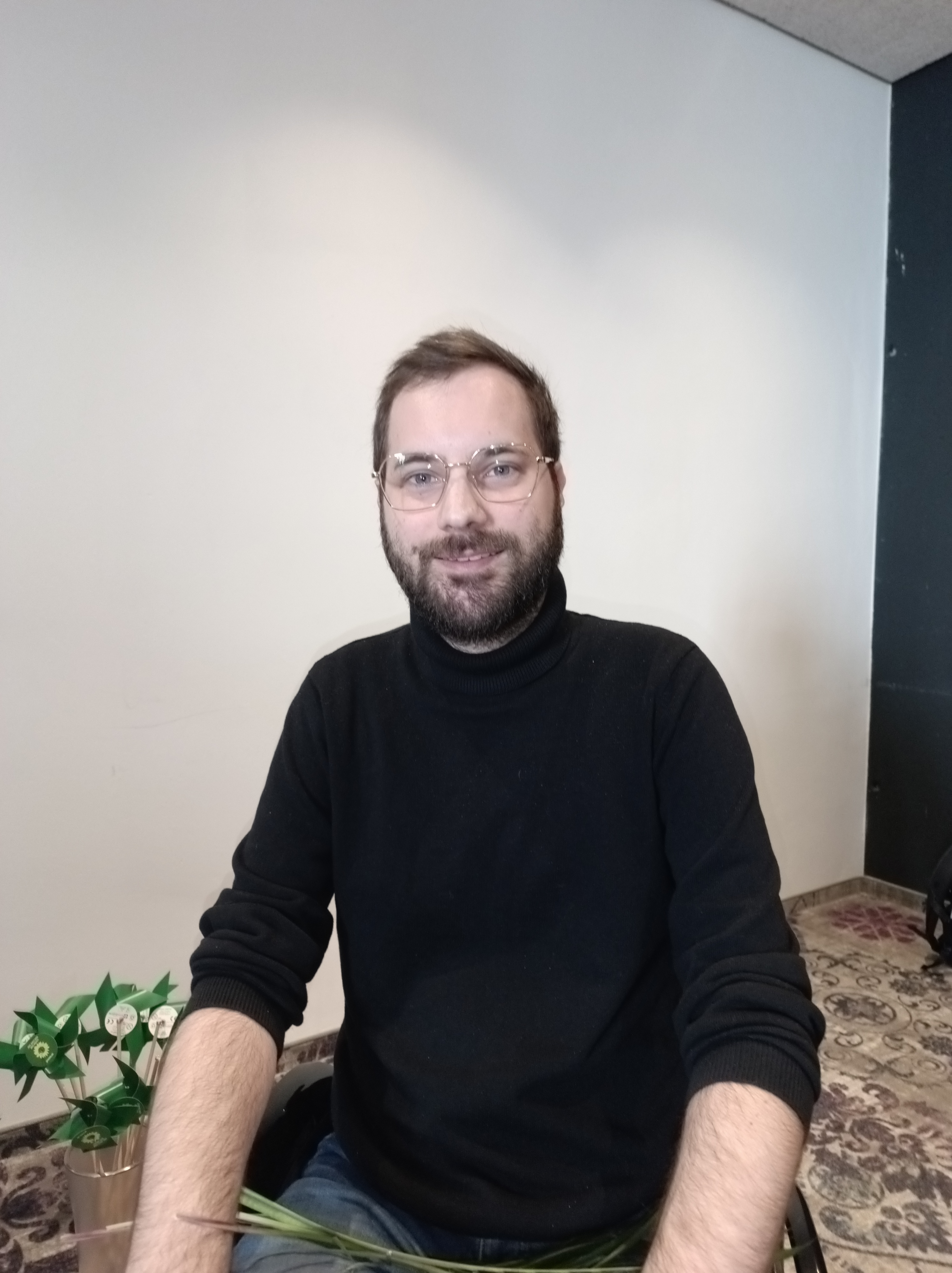
- Schauder in 2025

Member of the Landtag of Hesse
- In office 18 January 2019 – 17 January 2024

Personal details
- Born: 14 January 1997 (age 29) Frankfurt am Main
- Party: Alliance 90/The Greens (since 2013)

Lukas Schauder (born 14 January 1997 in Frankfurt am Main) is a German politician serving as co-chairman of Alliance 90/The Greens in the Ennepe-Ruhr-Kreis since 2025. From 2019 to 2024, he was a member of the Landtag of Hesse.
