= Barbara Linke =

German-American mechanical engineer

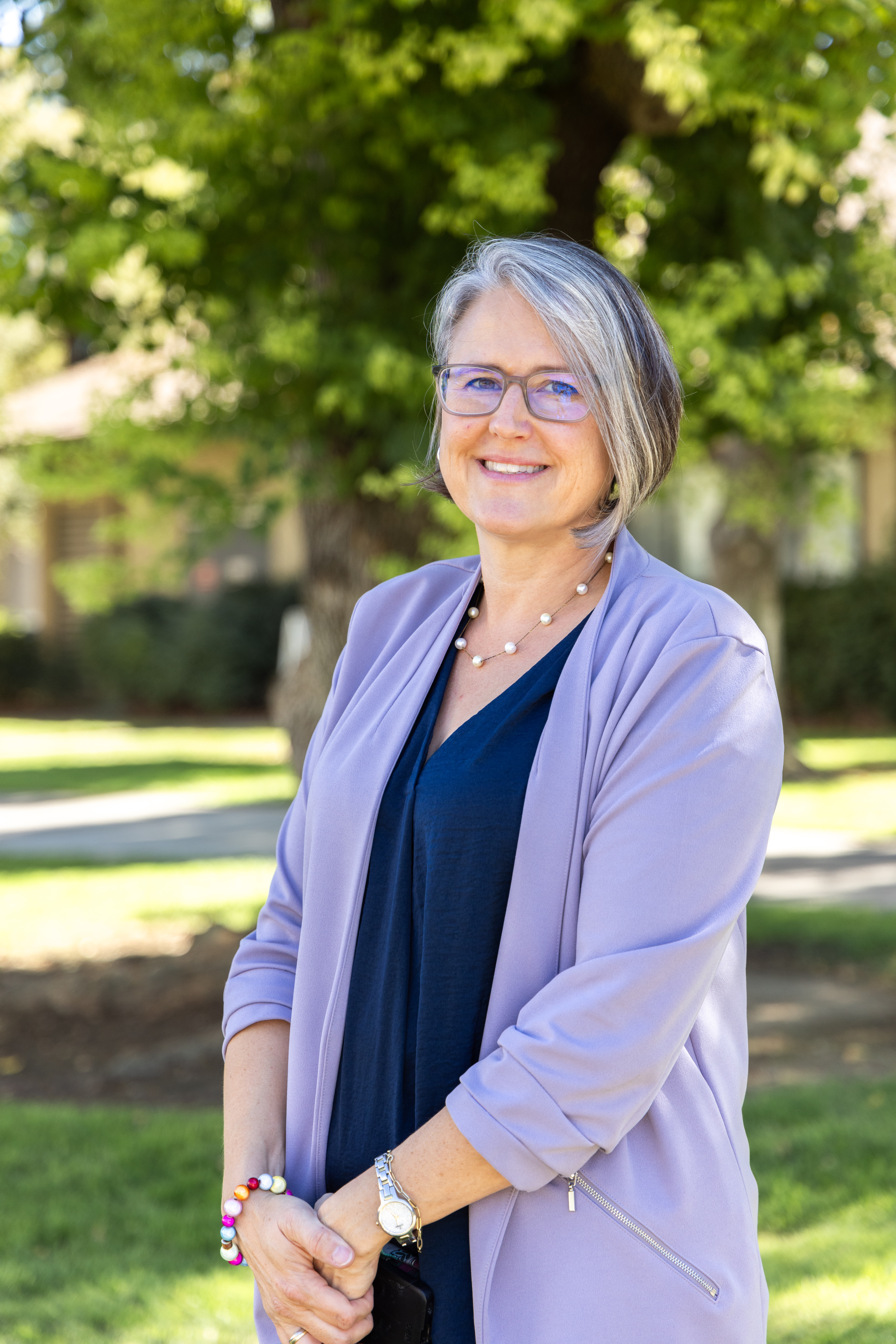
- Barbara Linke in 2024
- Born: Barbara Sabine Linke; 1977; Linnich, North Rhine-Westphalia, Germany
- Education: RWTH Aachen University
- Scientific career
- Workplaces: UC Davis
- Thesis: Wirkmechanismen beim Abrichten keramisch gebundener Schleifscheiben (2007)
- Doctoral advisor: Fritz Klocke
- Website: https://faculty.engineering.ucdavis.edu/linke/

Barbara Sabine Linke (born 1977) is a German-American mechanical engineer whose research concerns sustainability in manufacturing, abrasive machining, and personal-scale 3D printing. She is a professor in the Department of Mechanical and Aerospace Engineering at the University of California, Davis.

== Education and career ==
Linke earned a diploma in mechanical engineering from RWTH Aachen University in Germany in 2002, and completed a doctorate (Dr. Ing.) there in 2007. After postdoctoral research with Fritz Klocke at Aachen and with David Dornfeld at the University of California, Berkeley, she joined the University of California, Davis in 2012.

Linke earned a German habilitation through RWTH Aachen University in 2015, with the habilitation thesis Life Cycle and Sustainability of Abrasive Tools (Springer, 2016). She was promoted to associate professor in 2018 and full professor in 2023. In 2022 the university named her as a Chancellor's Fellow. At Davis, she heads the Manufacturing and Sustainable Technology Research Lab.

== Recognition ==
Linke was the recipient of the 2009 F.W. Taylor Medal of the International Academy for Production Engineering, and one of the 2013 recipients of the Outstanding Young Manufacturing Engineer Award of SME (the former Society of Manufacturing Engineers).

She was elected as an ASME Fellow in 2023.
