= René Gögge =

German politician (born 1985)

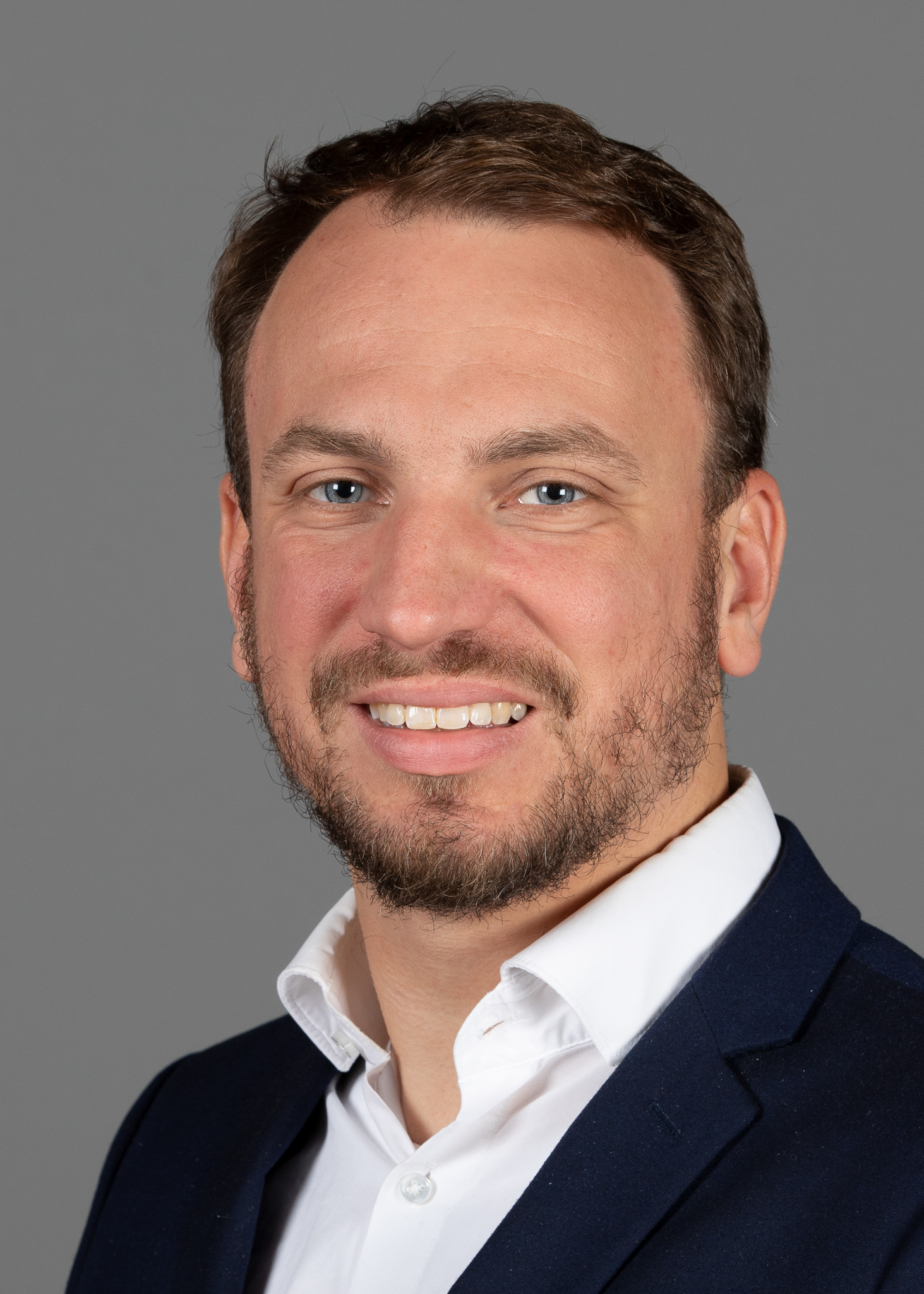
- Gögge in 2018

Member of the Hamburg Parliament
- Incumbent
- Assumed office 23 April 2015

Personal details
- Born: 22 November 1985 (age 40)
- Party: Alliance 90/The Greens (since 2002)

René Gögge (born 22 November 1985) is a German politician serving as a member of the Hamburg Parliament since 2015. He has been a member of Alliance 90/The Greens since 2002.
