= Sevim Çelebi-Gottschlich =

German politician

Member of the Abgeordnetenhaus of Berlin
- In office 1987–1989

Personal details
- Born: 1953 (age 72–73)
- Party: Alternative Liste

Sevim Çelebi-Gottschlich (born in 1953 in Turkey) is a former German politician, a member of Alliance '90/The Greens when it was still the Alternative Liste. She served from 1987 to 1989 in the Abgeordnetenhaus of Berlin, the state parliament of Berlin.

== Life and work ==
Çelebi-Gottschlich migrated to Berlin from Turkey in 1970 at the age of 17. In 1987 she would cause a minor sensation when she became the first individual of Turkish origin to enter any West German Parliament when she joined the Abgeordnetenhaus of Berlin on the ticket of the Alternative Liste (AL). When she began a parliamentary speech in Turkish in April 1987, members of the Christian Democratic Union drowned her out by pounding their fists on the table and she was forced to stop speaking.

== Bibliography ==
- "The Development of a Self-Help Project by Immigrant and German Women," 1988 (7 pages) for the International Symposium on Women in International Migration: Social, Cultural and Occupational Issues, with Special Attention to the Second Generation; Berlin, Germany FR in 1988.
