= Pegah Edalatian =

German politician (born 1980)

- پگاه عدالتیان
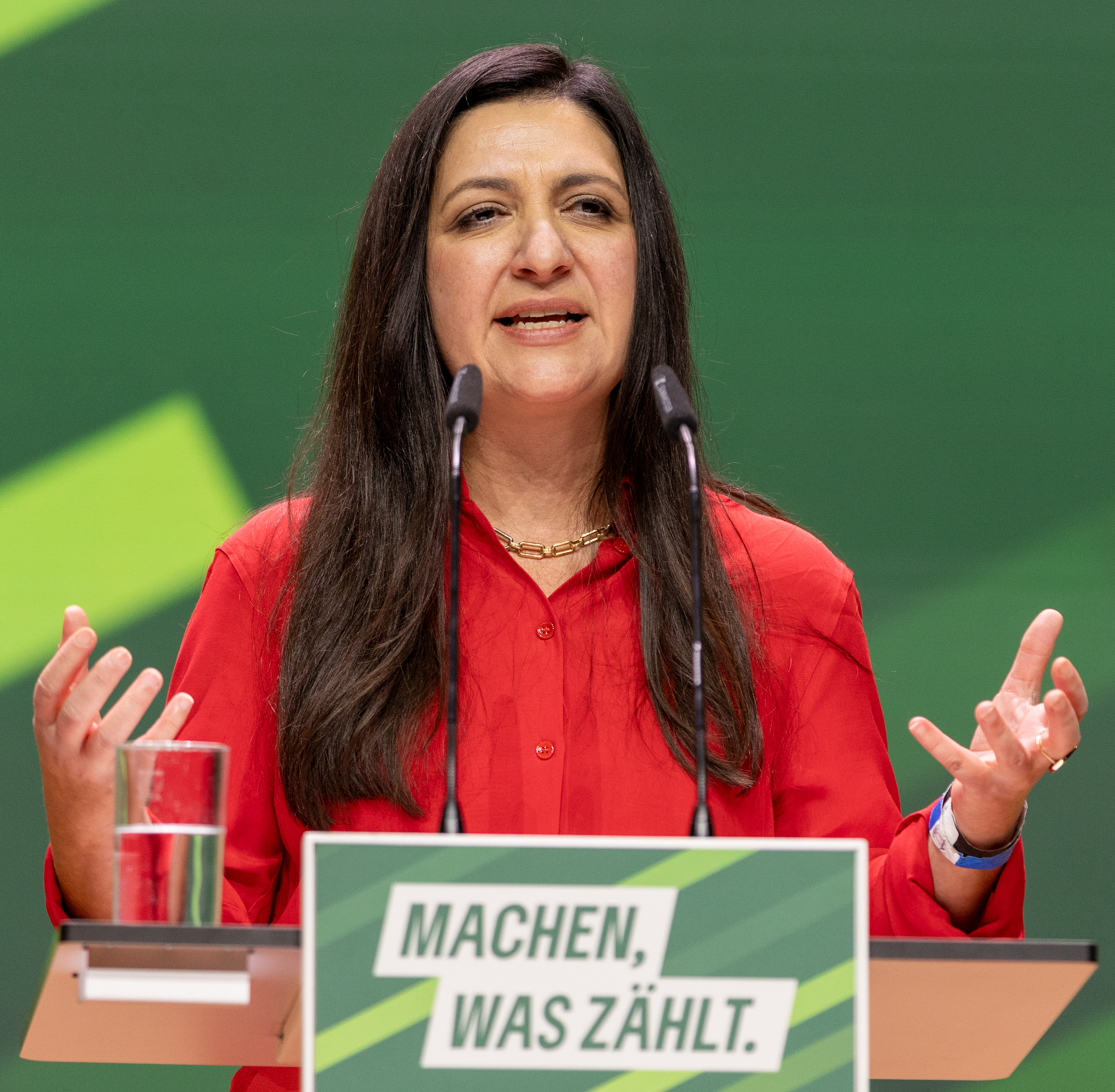
- Pegah Edalatian in 2023

Parliamentary group (Germany)

Personal details
- Born: Pegah Edalatian; 1980 (age 45–46) Kassel, Germany

Pegah Edalatian (Persian: پگاه عدالتیان; born 1980 in Kassel) is a German politician (Alliance 90/The Greens). She is a member of the Landtag of North Rhine-Westphalia.

Since 2022, she has been a member of the federal executive board of Alliance 90/The Greens. She served as Green Party Vice-Chair.

== Biography ==
Edalatian's parents emigrated from Iran to Germany. She studied political science, sociology, and media studies in Düsseldorf and began her political career there. She worked for the Alliance 90/The Greens parliamentary group in the Landtag of North Rhine-Westphalia. There, she was responsible for issues such as children, youth, and families, as well as one-world policy and fundamental issues.

From February 2022 to November 2024, Edalatian was deputy federal chairwoman and spokesperson for diversity policy, and thus part of the Federal Executive Board of Alliance 90/The Greens. Since November 2024, she has been political director and thus continues to be part of the federal executive board. She received 81.2% of the vote at the federal party conference in Wiesbaden.
