= Jule Wenzel =

German politician (born 1990)

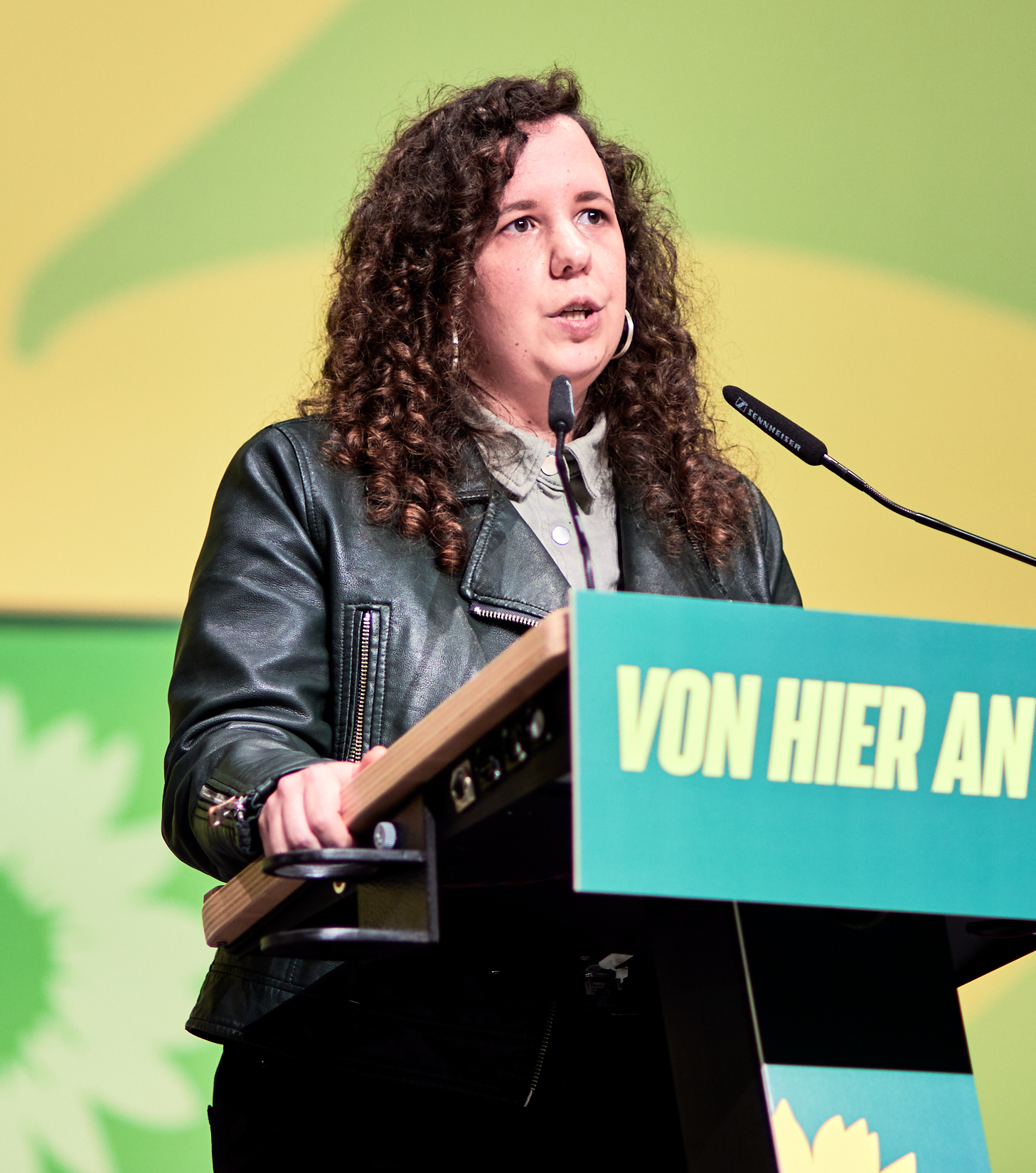
- Wenzel in 2021

Member of the Landtag of North Rhine-Westphalia
- Incumbent
- Assumed office 1 June 2022

Personal details
- Born: 27 November 1990 (age 35)
- Party: Alliance 90/The Greens (since 2009)

Julia Wenzel (born 27 November 1990), better known as Jule Wenzel, is a German politician serving as a member of the Landtag of North Rhine-Westphalia since 2022. She has served as chief whip of Alliance 90/The Greens since 2026.
