= Dennis Sonne =

German politician (born 1984)

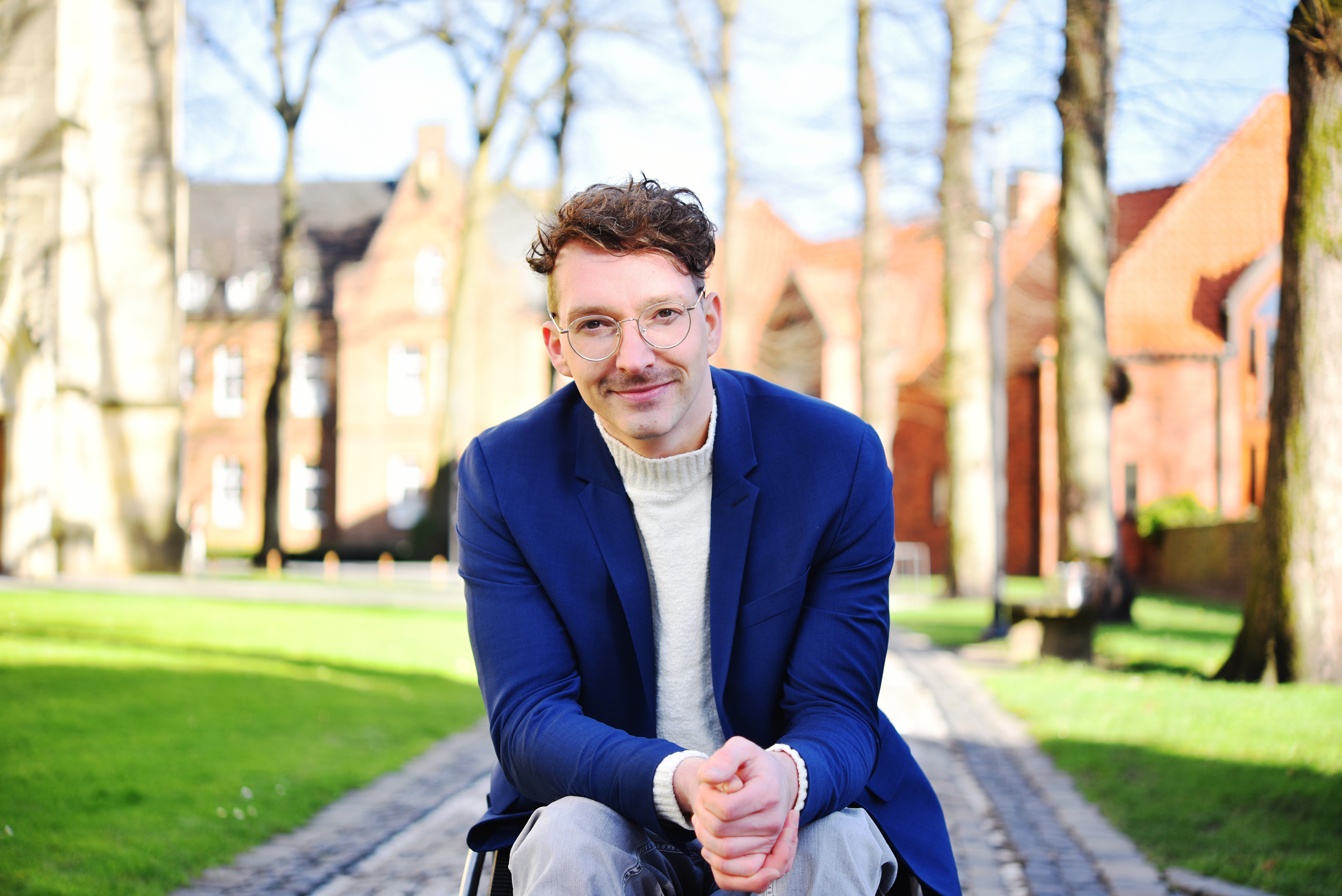
- Sonne in 2022

Member of the Landtag of North Rhine-Westphalia
- Incumbent
- Assumed office 1 June 2022

Personal details
- Born: 6 January 1984 (age 42) Werne
- Party: Alliance 90/The Greens (since 2011)

Dennis Christopher Sonne (né Zittlau; born 6 January 1984 in Werne) is a German politician serving as a member of the Landtag of North Rhine-Westphalia since 2022. From 2017 to 2022, he was a city councillor of Lüdinghausen.
