= Michael Röls-Leitmann =

German politician (born 1997)

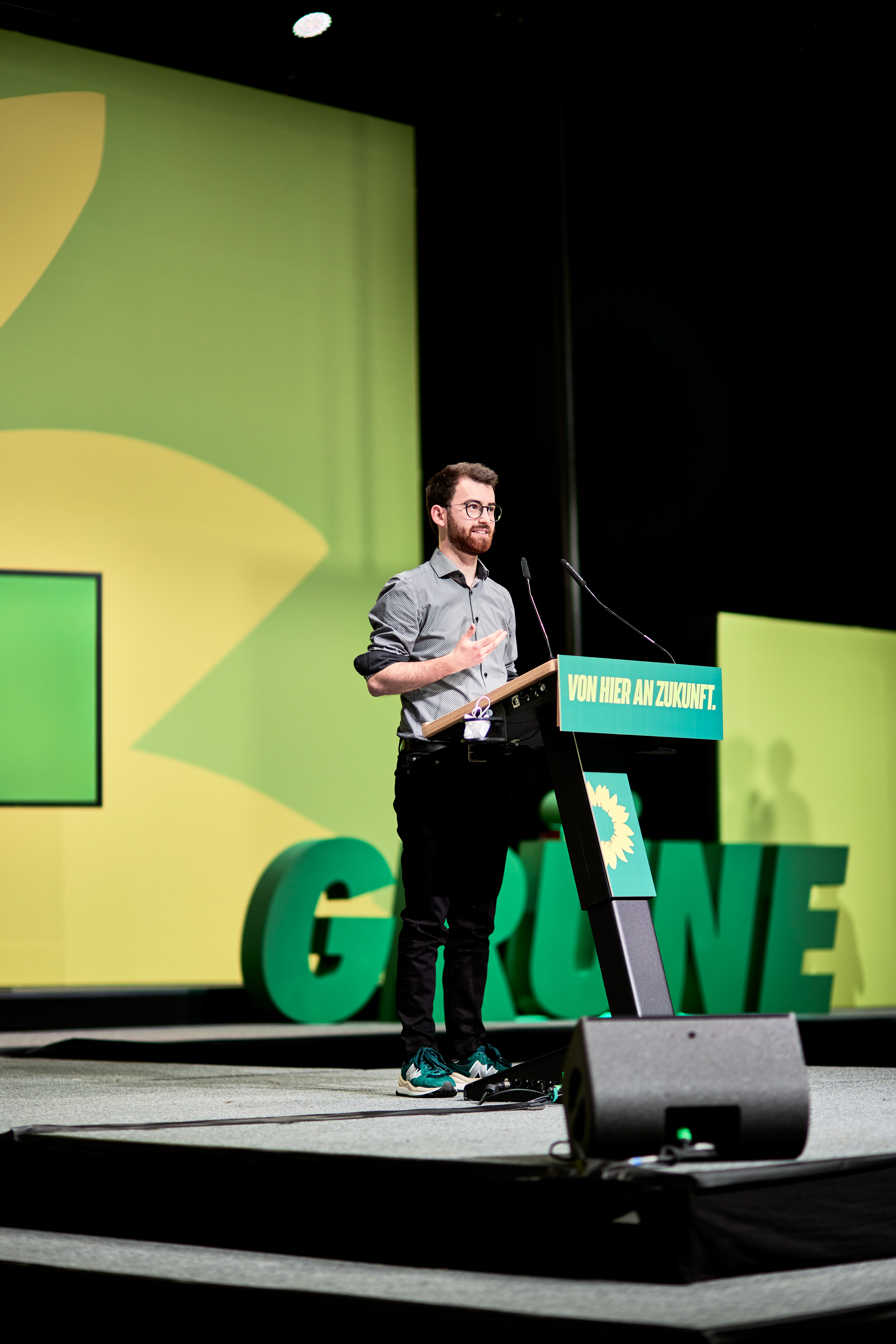
- Röls-Leitmann in 2021

Member of the Landtag of North Rhine-Westphalia
- Incumbent
- Assumed office 1 June 2022

Personal details
- Born: 3 September 1997 (age 28) Aachen
- Party: Alliance 90/The Greens (since 2013)

Michael Röls-Leitmann (born 3 September 1997 in Aachen) is a German politician serving as a member of the Landtag of North Rhine-Westphalia since 2022. He has served as deputy group leader of Alliance 90/The Greens since 2022.
