= Christian Kühn =

German politician (born 1979)

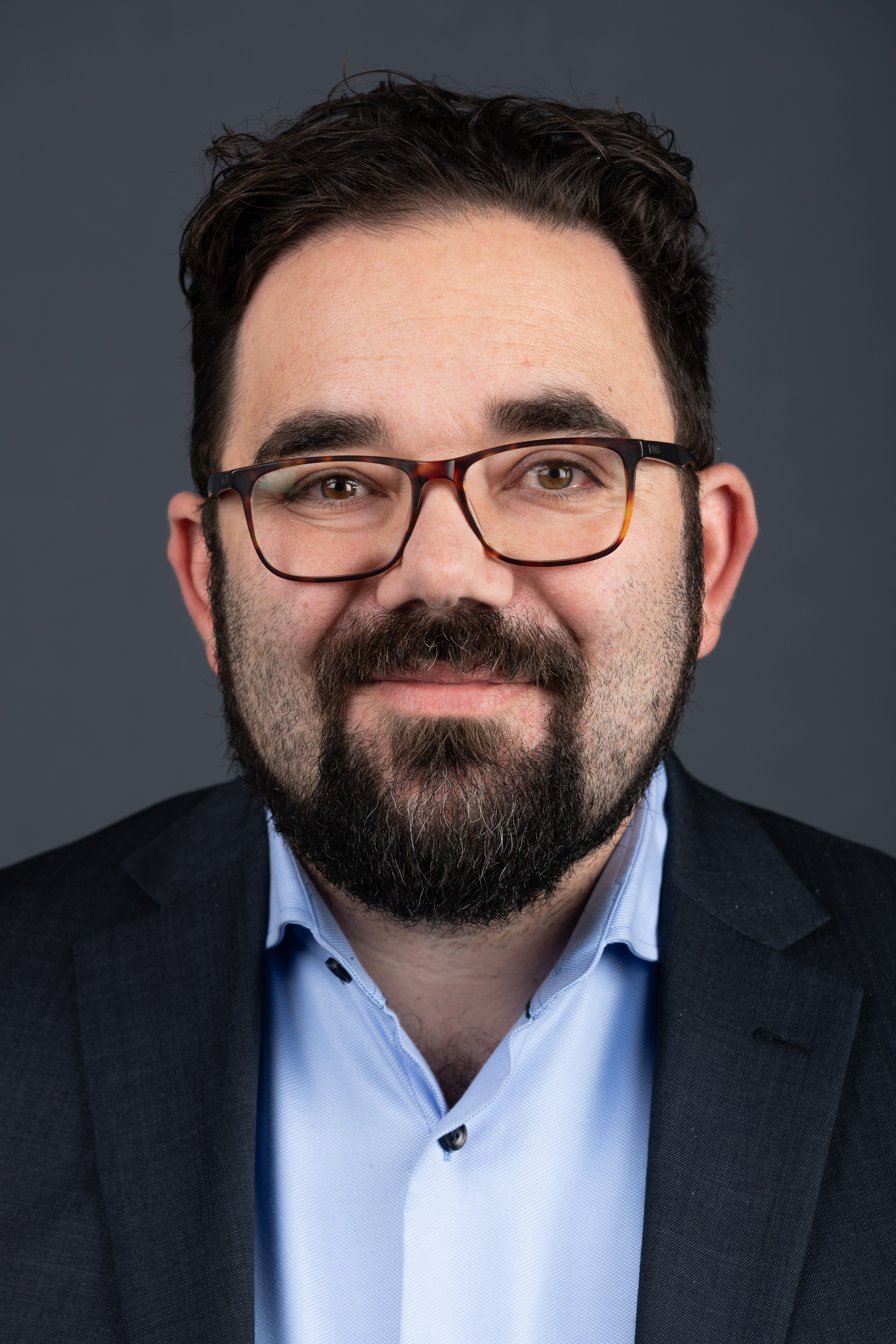
- Christian Kühn in 2020

Member of the Bundestag
- In office 2013–2024
- Succeeded by: Jürgen Kretz

Personal details
- Born: 9 April 1979 (age 47) Tübingen, West Germany (now Germany)
- Party: Greens
- Children: 3
- Education: University of Tübingen

Christian Kühn (born 9 April 1979) is a German politician of Alliance 90/The Greens who has been serving as president of the Federal Office for the Safety of Nuclear Waste Management (BASE) since 2024.

From 2013 to 2024, Kühn was a member of the Bundestag from the state of Baden-Württemberg. In addition to his parliamentary work, he was a Parliamentary State Secretary in the Federal Ministry for the Environment, Nature Conservation, Nuclear Safety and Consumer Protection in the coalition government of Chancellor Olaf Scholz from 2021 to 2024.

== Early life and career ==
Kühn grew up in Göppingen, where he completed his high school diploma and community service and then studied political science and sociology at the University of Tübingen. After graduating in 2009, he worked as a staff member in the Dean's office of the Faculty of Economic Sciences.

== Political career ==
From 2009 until 2013, Kühn served as co-chair (alongside Silke Krebs) of the Green Party in Baden Württemberg. In the negotiations on a coalition government following the 2011 state elections in Baden-Württemberg, he led the Green Party's delegation alongside Krebs and Winfried Kretschmann in the Bundestag.

Kühn first became a member of the 18th Bundestag in the 2013 federal elections, representing Tübingen. In parliament, he was a member of the Committee on Construction, Housing, Urban Development and Municipalities and served as his parliamentary group's spokesman on construction and housing policy.

In addition to his committee assignments, Kühn was part of the German-Mexican Parliamentary Friendship Group.

In 2024 he resigned from the Bundestag and was replaced by Jürgen Kretz.

== Other activities ==
- Federal Company for Radioactive Waste Disposal (BGE), Ex-Officio Chair of the Supervisory Board (since 2022)
- German Industry Initiative for Energy Efficiency (DENEFF), Member of the Parliamentary Advisory Board
