= Bogusz Schmidt =

German politician (born 1999)

- Schmidt in 2026

Member of the Berlin House of Representatives
- Incumbent
- Assumed office 29 October 2026

Personal details
- Born: 1999 (age 26–27)
- Party: Alliance 90/The Greens (since 2017)

Bogusz Schmidt (born 1999) is a German politician who was elected member of the Berlin House of Representatives in 2026. From 2021 to 2026, he was a borough councillor of Reinickendorf.
