= Stephanie Schuhknecht =

German politician (born 1983)

Member of the Landtag of Bavaria
- Incumbent
- Assumed office 5 November 2018
- Constituency: Swabia

Personal details
- Born: 13 January 1983 (age 43) Augsburg
- Party: Alliance 90/The Greens (since 2010)

Stephanie Schuhknecht (born 13 January 1983 in Augsburg) is a German politician serving as a member of the Landtag of Bavaria since 2018. She has served chairwoman of the Committee on Economic Affairs, Regional Development, Energy, Media and Digitalisation since 2023.
