= Jürgen Kretz =

German politician (born 1982)

Jürgen Kretz (born 7 June 1982 in Heidelberg) is a German politician of the Alliance 90/The Greens who has been serving as a Member of the German Bundestag since February 2024.

== Early life and education ==
Kretz grew up in Wiesloch and graduated from high school there in 2001. He then completed alternative civilian service in a children's home in Lima, Peru. From 2002 to 2008 he studied political science and intercultural communications at the Chemnitz University of Technology. He completed his studies with a master's degree.

Kretz is a Roman Catholic.

== Early career ==
After graduating, Kretz briefly worked for Bundestag member Gert Weisskirchen (SPD). From 2009 to 2012 he worked as a research assistant in the office of Bundestag member Viola von Cramon-Taubadel (Greens). From 2012 until his entry into the Bundestag in 2024, he worked at the Federal Ministry for Economic Cooperation and Development. Among several positions, he served as head of the development cooperation department at the German Embassy in Kinshasa for two years.

== Political career ==
Kretz has been a member of Alliance 90/The Greens since 2009. From 2014 to 2016 he was a member of the district council of the Rhein-Neckar-Kreises district.

In the 2021 federal election, Kretz ran in the Rhine-Neckar federal constituency and in 19th place on the Green Party's state list in Baden-Württemberg, but initially missed out on entering the Bundestag. On 15 February 2024, he replaced Christian Kühn in the Bundestag when he resigned. He has since been serving on the Committee on the Environment, Nature Conservation, Nuclear Safety and Consumer Protection.

== Other activities ==
- German Institute for Development Evaluation (DEval), Member of the advisory board (since 2024)
- German United Services Trade Union (ver.di), Member
- Germanwatch, Member
