= Silvia Schön =

German politician (born 1959)

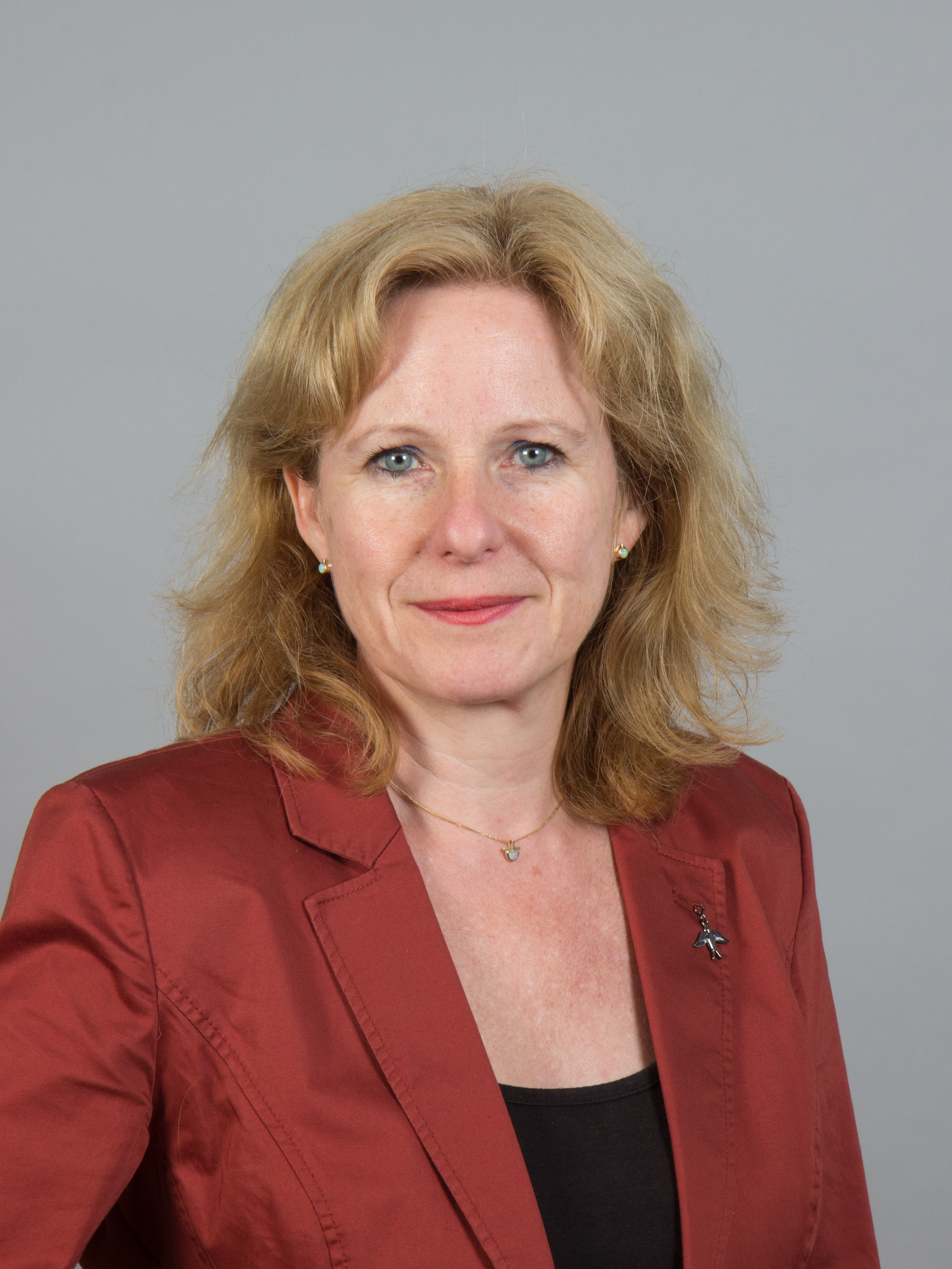
- Silvia Schön in 2014

Member of the Bremen Parliament
- In office 2003–2015

Personal details
- Born: 30 July 1959 (age 67) Bremen, Germany
- Party: Alliance 90/The Greens
- Education: University of Bremen; University of Strasbourg

Silvia Schön (born 30 July 1959) is a German politician from Alliance 90/The Greens. She was a member of the Bürgerschaft of Bremen from 2003 to 2015.

== Biography ==
=== Education and career ===
Schön studied biology at the University of Bremen and the University of Strasbourg and worked as a freelance journalist specializing in science, medicine, and technology. In 1989 and 1990, she was the managing director of the Green Party's district and city council group in Unna, and from 1990 to 2003, she was the managing director of the Bremen Environmental Advisory Service. In addition, she worked as an expert consultant for environmental projects in Turkey and the Middle East, and from 1991 to 1995, she was an advisor for labor and environmental protection campaigns for the IG Metall trade union.

=== Political career ===
Schön was active in the Bremen citizens' initiative against nuclear power plants in the 1970s and was a member of the student council. From 1982 to 1984, she chaired the student union (AStA) at the University of Bremen. She served as spokesperson for the Federal Working Group of Greens and Trade Unions from 1989 to 1993. From 1995 to 1999, she was a member of the advisory board for the eastern suburbs of Bremen and from 1996 to 2000 a board member of the Heinrich Böll Foundation Bremen. In 2000/2001, she was a member of the state executive committee of Alliance 90/The Greens and served as the party's state spokesperson from 2001 to 2003.

From 2003 to 2015, Schön was a member of the Bremen Parliament. She served on the Committee for Science, Media, Data Protection and Freedom of Information (chair), the Budget and Finance Committee (City), the Audit Committee (State and City), the Constitutional and Rules of Procedure Committee, and the executive board of the Bremen Parliament, as well as on the State Deputation for Education and the Subcommittee for Vocational Training.

Schön advocates for equal educational opportunities regardless of social background, strengthening the cities of Bremen and Bremerhaven as centers of science, and creating ecologically sustainable jobs. Ending primate experiments at the University of Bremen is of great importance to her.

She has been a member of the Board of Trustees of the Alfred Wegener Institute for Polar and Marine Research in the Helmholtz Associationy since 2012.

=== Other memberships ===
Schön was a board member of the state association for environmental consulting Bremen/Lower Saxony.
