= June Tomiak =

German politician (born 1997)

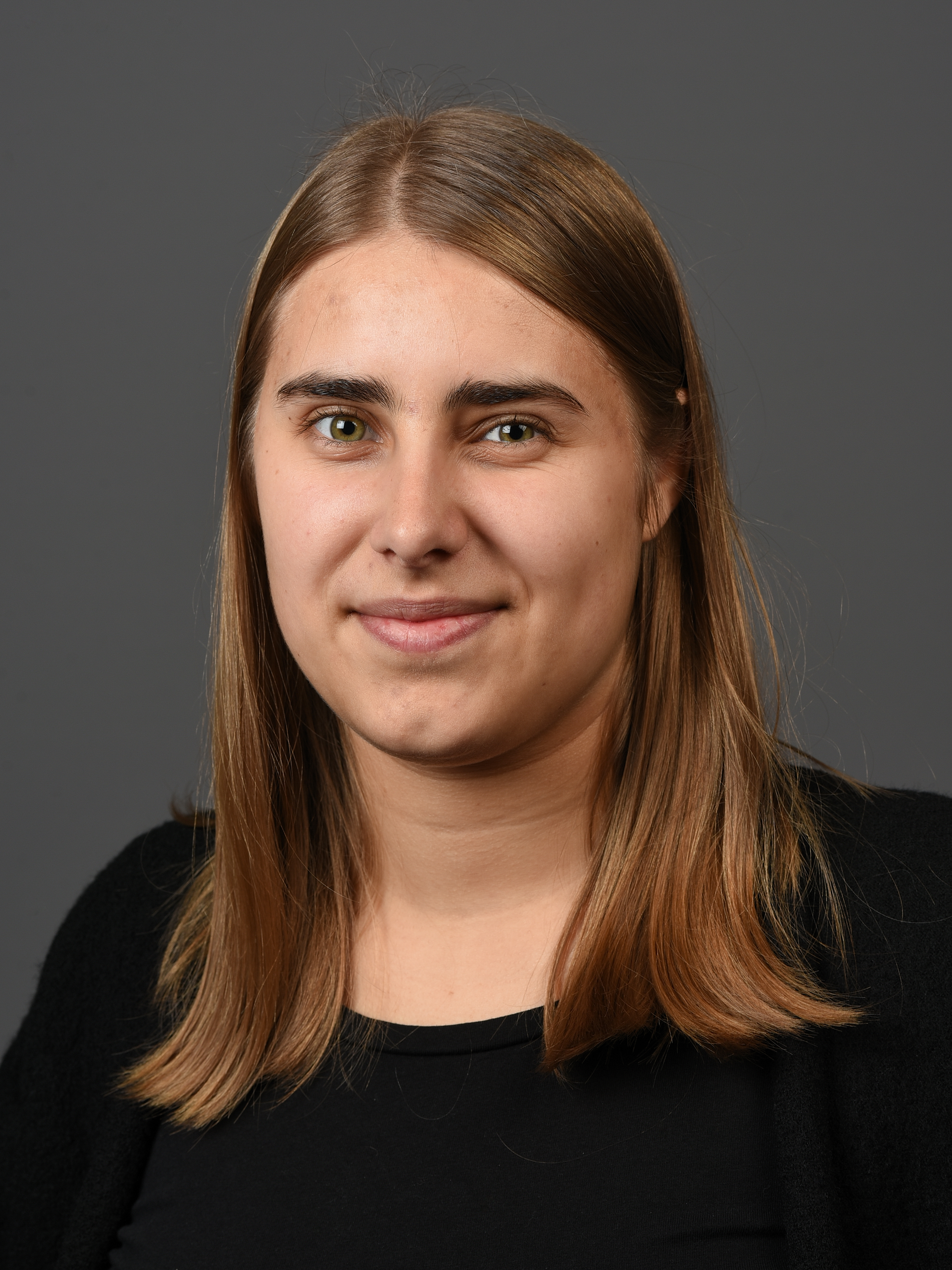

Member of the Abgeordnetenhaus of Berlin
- Incumbent
- Assumed office 27 October 2016
- Constituency: State-wide list

Personal details
- Born: 8 February 1997 (age 29) Berlin, Germany
- Party: Alliance 90/The Greens
- Occupation: Politician
- Website: junetomiak.de

June Tomiak (born 8 February 1997) is a German politician, currently serving as Member of the Abgeordnetenhaus of Berlin since the 2016 election as a statewide member representing Alliance 90/The Greens.

== Personal life ==
Tomiak was born in Berlin and grew up in Soldiner Kiez in Wedding. She describes her family life as "patchwork and rainbow". She received her Abitur qualification at Gottfried-Keller-Gymnasium. Alongside her political roles Tomiak studies culture and technology with a focus on philosophy at TU Berlin.

== Career ==
Prior to entering state politics Tomiak involved in school and borough politics. She was first elected in 2016 at the age of 19, as the youngest member of the Abgeordnetenhaus.

Tomiak is the Greens spokesperson for youth policy and strategies against right-wing extremism.

Tomiak describers herself as an anti-fascist and an intersectional feminist.
