= Ursula Helmhold =

German politician

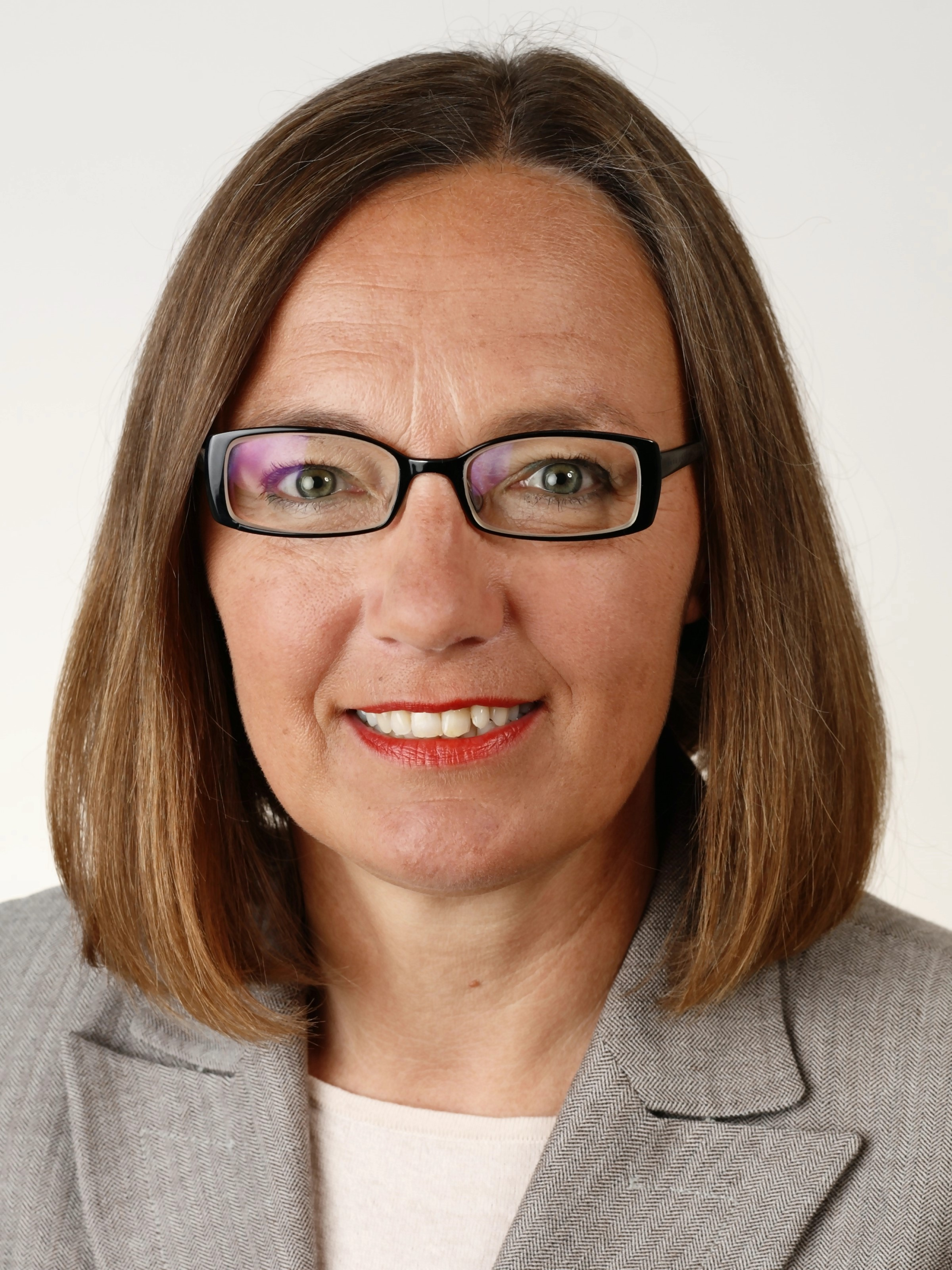
- Born: April 26, 1966 (age 59); Recklinghausen, West Germany
- Occupation: Politician

Ursula Helmhold (born 26 April 1966) is a German politician for the Alliance '90/The Greens. She was elected to the Lower Saxon Landtag in 2003, and has been re-elected on one occasion.
