= Evrim Akyigit =

Dutch actress

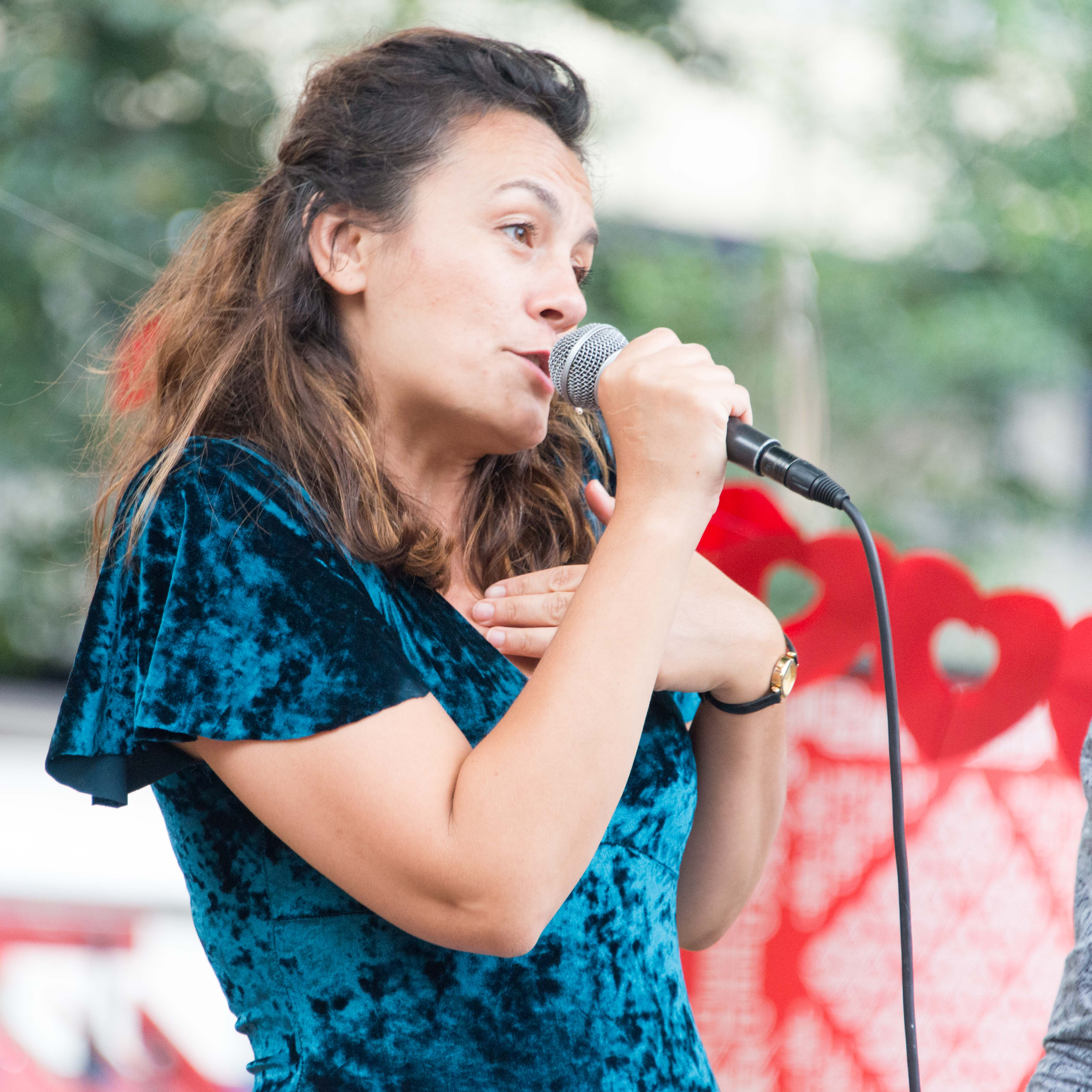
Evrim Akyigit

Evrim Akyigit is a Dutch actress of Turkish origin. She is best known for her role as Cabar-Elif Özal in the Dutch soap opera Onderweg Naar Morgen.

== Filmography ==
Film
Year	Film	Role	Notes
2002	Tom & Thomas	Mirror Maze Visitor	
1996	Woensdag, gehaktdag	Rachel	

=== Television ===
Year	Film	Role	Notes
2005–2007	Onderweg naar morgen	Elif Cabar-Özal	108 episodes
1997	Duidelijke taal!	Ayfer	1 episode
1996	Fort Alpha	Toprak Yuksel	
