= Pippa Schneider =

German politician (born 1994)

Member of the Landtag of Lower Saxony
- Incumbent
- Assumed office 8 November 2022

Personal details
- Born: 4 December 1994 (age 31) Kassel
- Party: Alliance 90/The Greens (since 2011)

Luisa Pippa Schneider (born 4 December 1994 in Kassel) is a German politician serving as a member of the Landtag of Lower Saxony since 2022. From 2020 to 2021, she served as co-spokesperson of the Green Youth in Lower Saxony.
