= Malte Gallée =

German politician (born 1993)

Malte Gallée MEP
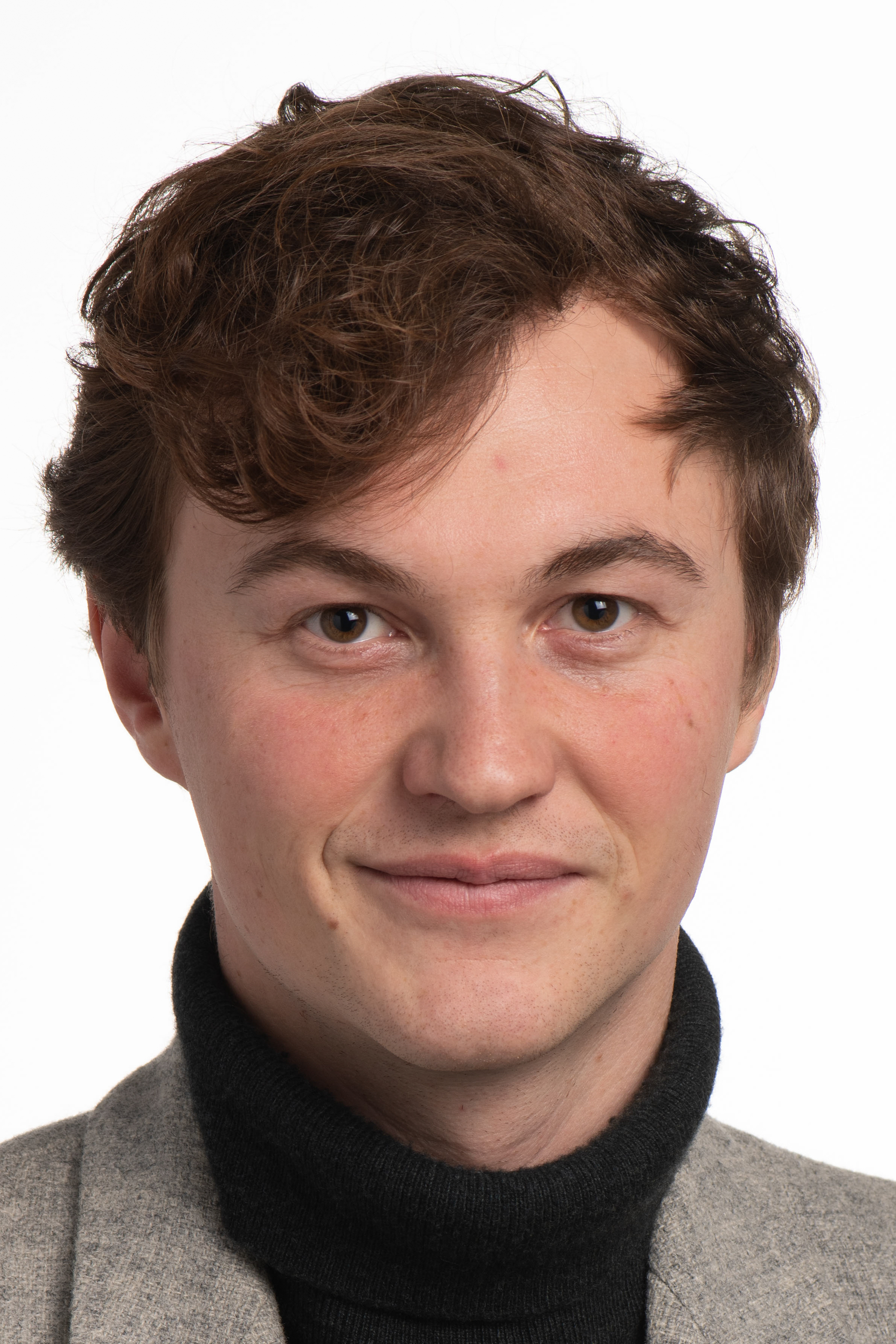

Member of the European Parliament
- In office 22 December 2021 – 1 March 2024
- Preceded by: Sven Giegold
- Constituency: Germany

Personal details
- Born: Malte Lenz Gallée; 5 October 1993 (age 33) Schwäbisch Gmünd, Baden-Württemberg, Germany
- Party: German: Alliance 90/The Greens; EU: The Greens–European Free Alliance
- Education: University of Bayreuth

Malte Lenz Gallée (born 5 September 1993) is a German politician from Alliance 90/The Greens. He was a Member of the European Parliament from 2021 to 2024. He took the place of Sven Giegold, who resigned as an MEP to join the domestic government following the 2021 German federal election. On 1 March 2024, he resigned from his seat in the European Parliament after it emerged that staff had made several allegations of sexual assault and bullying against him since 2022.

== Live ==
For the 2024 European election, the Bavarian B90/Greens nominated Gallée alongside Henrike Hahn as a lead candidate. Prior to the establishment of the Green Party's federal list for the European election in November 2023, Gallée withdrew his candidacy, citing "personal reasons."

On March 10, 2024, Gallée resigned from his parliamentary seat. This followed allegations, published in the magazine Stern, by several parliamentary staff members who claimed he had sexually harassed them starting in the summer of 2022. Gallée himself denied the allegations. He was succeeded in the European Parliament by Jan Ovelgönne.

== See also ==
- List of members of the European Parliament for Germany, 2019–2024
