= Valerie Wilms =

German politician

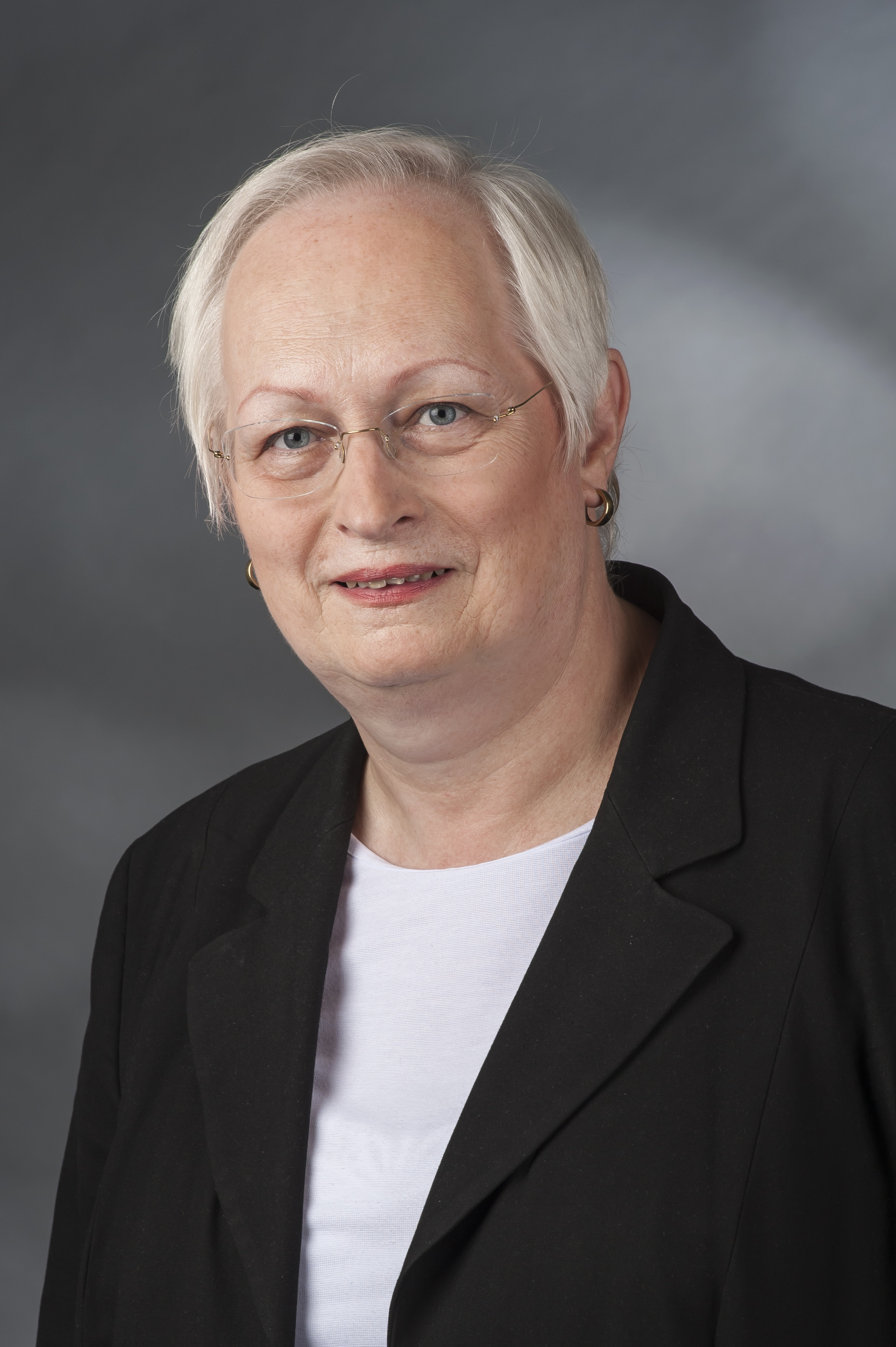
Wilms in 2014

Valerie Wilms (formerly Volker Wilms) is a retired German politician (previously Alliance 90/The Greens; unaffiliated since 2023). She was a member of the Bundestag – the federal parliament – from 2009 to 2017 and also works in regional politics in Wedel. She came out as trans in 2025.

== Education and career ==
Wilms was born on 22 January 1954 in Hannover. After her Abitur, she studied engineering and got her Diploma in 1977. In 1981, she got her Doctorate.

From 1981 to 1983, Wilms worked as an engineer for construction in Hamburg. From 1983 to 2006, she was a technical supervisor at the Berufsgenossenschaft Bahnen. From 2004, she lectured at the Dresden University of Applied Sciences and additionally works as a freelance author since 2006.

== Political work ==
Wilms joined the Green Party in 2005 and became spokesperson for the state working group on energy policy of her party's Schleswig-Holstein-branch in 2006. From 2007 to 2008, she was spokesperson of the Pinneberg district executive board of the Greene Party. In 2008, she became the spokesperson for the federal working group on energy of the Green Party, joined the city council of the town of Wedel served as the deputy mayor. During this time, she also joined the Pinneberg district government and contributed to the committee for environment, safety and order.

In the Federal Election of 2009, she candidated for the Pinneberg electoral district where she got 6,143 votes (9.3%), coming fourth. She re-candidated in the 2013 election, coming third with 11,324 (6.4%) votes. Both times, she moved into the Bundestag, the federal parliament, despite not winning the constituency through the so-called state list. In the Bundestag, she was a full member of the Committee for Tourism and a deputy member of the Committee for Transport, Building and Urban Development.

In June 2023, she resigned from the Alliance 90/The Greens party. She justified this by saying that the Greens had become a "driver for a woke cultural revolution" and criticised an "irrational, self-destructive climate panic". She later candidated for the regional party Wedeler Soziale Initiative (WSI) ("Wedel Social Initiative"), with which she also got a seat in the city council.

== Private life ==
Wilms is married and has two children.

Wilms came out as trans in 2025. She does not see herself as a biological female and has described transsexuality as a mental illness.
