= Alexander Salomon =

German politician (born 1986)

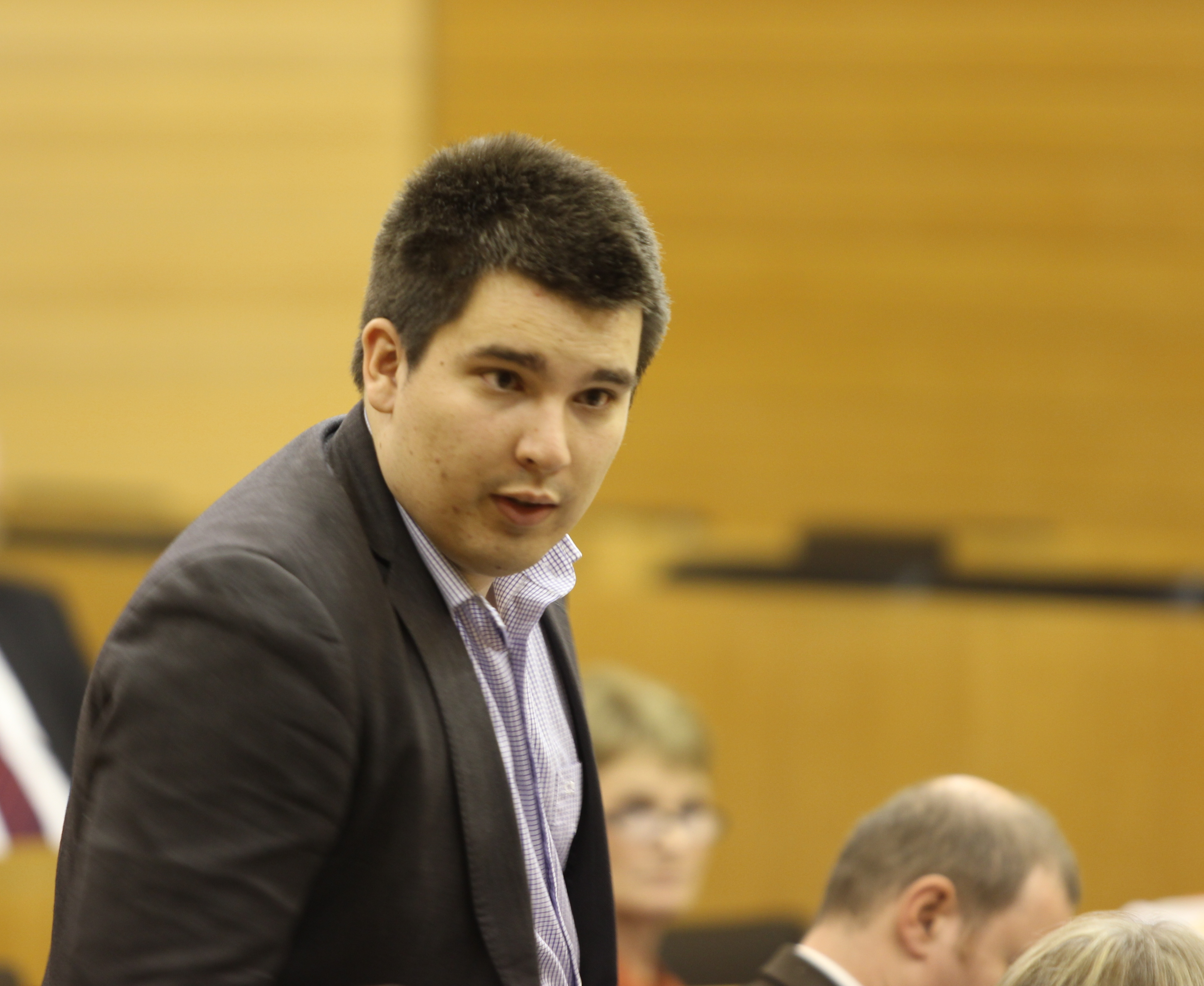
- Salomon in 2013

Member of the Landtag of Baden-Württemberg
- Incumbent
- Assumed office 13 April 2011
- Constituency: Karlsruhe II

Personal details
- Born: 6 August 1986 (age 39) Karlsruhe
- Party: Alliance 90/The Greens

Alexander Salomon (born 6 August 1986 in Karlsruhe) is a German politician serving as a member of the Landtag of Baden-Württemberg since 2011. From 2022 to 2024, he served as chairman of the inquiry committee on crisis prevention.
