= Verena Osgyan =

German politician

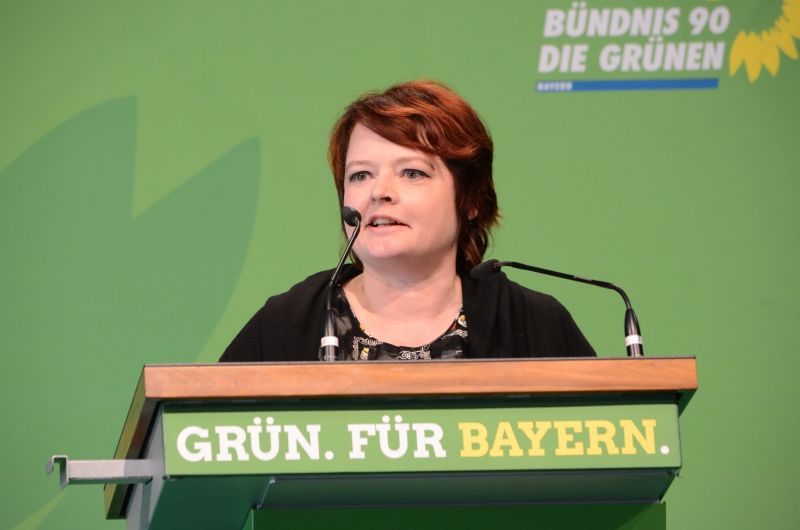

Member of the Landtag of Bavaria
- Incumbent
- Assumed office 16 September 2013

Personal details
- Born: 14 May 1971 (age 55) Roth, Bavaria, West Germany
- Party: Alliance '90/The Greens

Verena Osgyan (born 14 May 1971) is a German politician (Alliance '90/The Greens). She is Member of the Bavarian Landtag and vice-chairwoman of her party.

== Life ==
=== Education and work ===
Osgyan studied communication design at Technische Hochschule Nürnberg where she graduated as Diplom-Designerin (FH). From 1999 to 2004 she worked as art director for the HL-Studios in Erlangen, from 2004 to 2010 she was an editor for ARD in Munich. From 2010 to 2013 she worked as online marketing manager at Teambank in Nürnberg.

=== Political career ===
Osgyan became a member of the Green party 1988 while being at school. She is a member of the working groups on university education, media and digitalisation, women and culture of the Bavarian Greens. From 2010 to 2012 she was leader of the greens in Middle Franconia, from 2012 to 2018 of the Nuremberg Greens.

At the 2013 Bavarian state election Osgyan stood as candidate in West-Nuremberg and was the green top candidate in Middle Franconia. She was elected Member of the Bayerischer Landtag. In the 2018 Bavarian state election she ran again. She reached the second-best result in Middle Franconia and thus was re-elected.

In June 2019 the Nuremberg Greens nominated her for the post as Mayor of Nuremberg.

=== Private life ===
Osgyan is married, has one child and lives in Nuremberg.
