= Stefan Engstfeld =

German politician (born 1970)

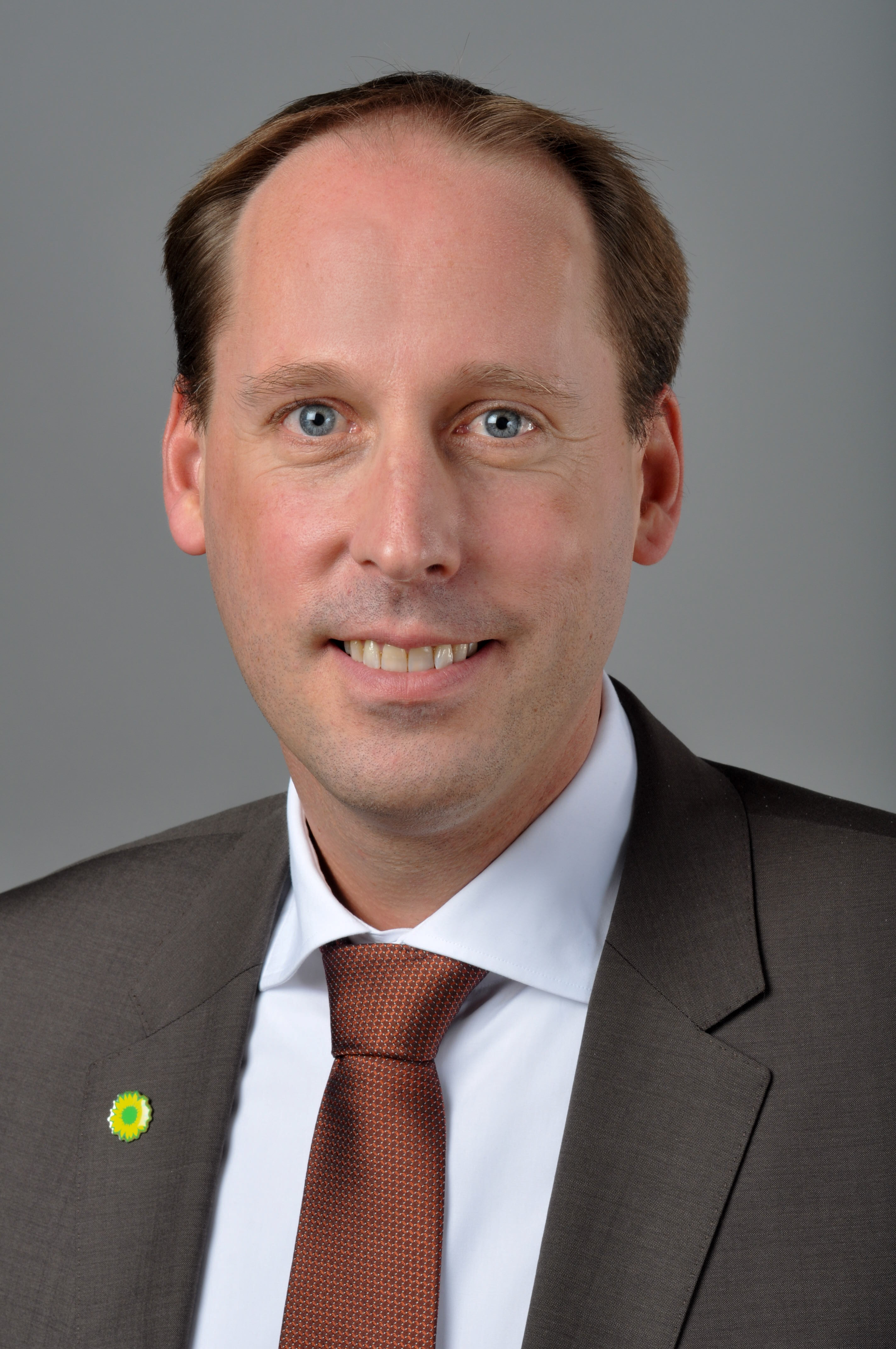
- Engstfeld in 2013

Member of the Landtag of North Rhine-Westphalia
- Incumbent
- Assumed office 13 June 2019
- Preceded by: Barbara Steffens
- In office 9 June 2010 – 31 May 2017

Personal details
- Born: 5 January 1970 (age 56) Duisburg
- Party: Alliance 90/The Greens (since 1996)

Stefan Engstfeld (born 5 January 1970 in Duisburg) is a German politician. He has been a member of the Landtag of North Rhine-Westphalia since 2018, having previously served from 2010 to 2017. He has served as spokesperson of Alliance 90/The Greens in Düsseldorf since 2021.
