= Peter Meiwald =

German politician

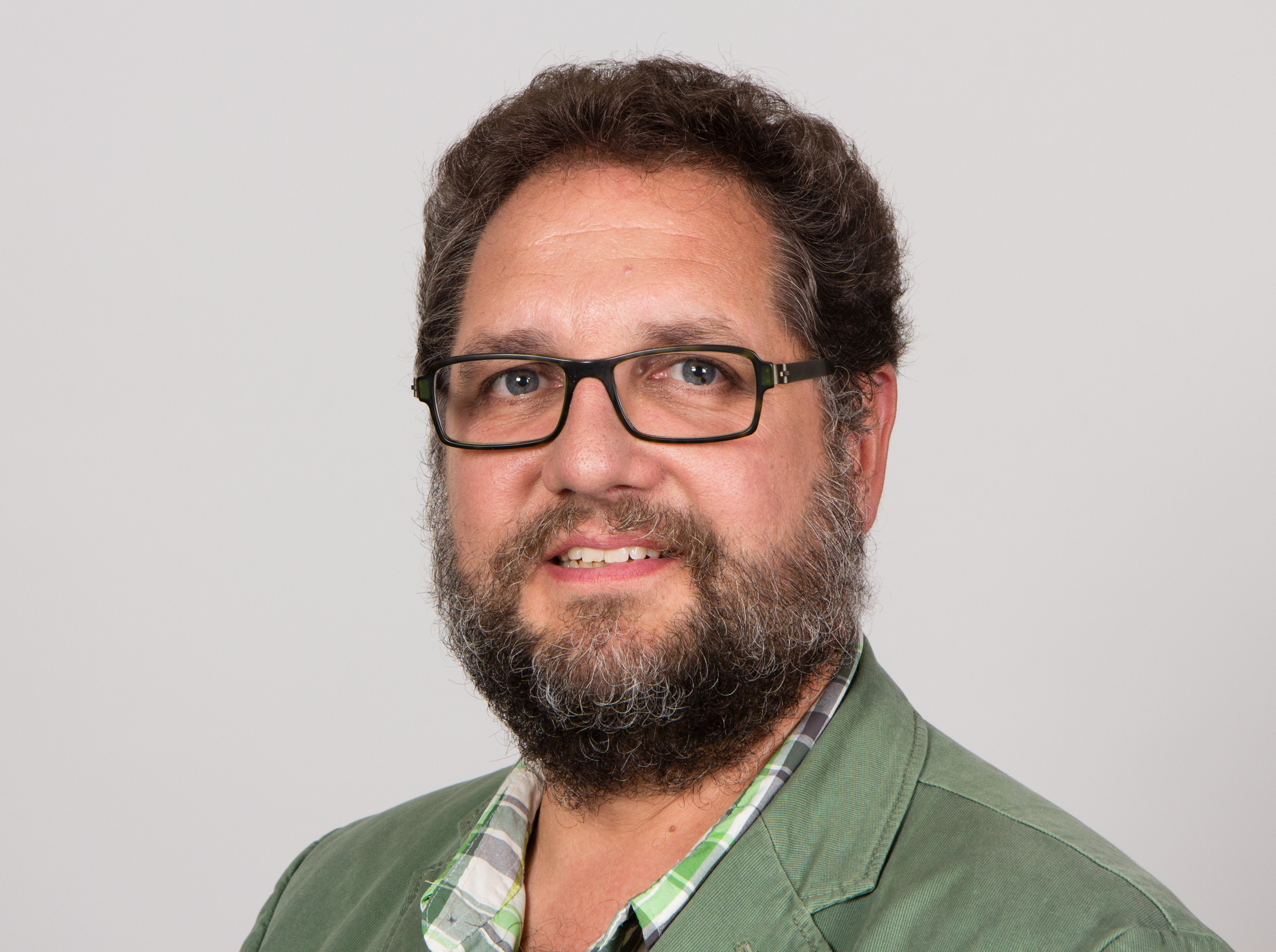
Meiwald in 2014

Peter Meiwald is a German politician of the Green Party who was member of the Bundestag from 2013 to 2017.

== Biography ==
Born on 31 March 1966 in Oldenburg, Meiwald got his Abitur in 1985 in Vechta and then studied social education, graduating in 1991. He then worked as a family counsellor.

He was head of the Africa/Middle East Department at the episcopal aid organisation Misereor.

=== Political work ===
He was member of the German Bundestag (MdB) from 2013 to 2017, representing Electoral District 27 (Oldenburg and Ammerland).

In the Bundestag, he led the Committee on the Environment, Nature Conservation, Building and Nuclear Safety and was member of the Committee on the Environment, Nature Conservation, Building and Nuclear Safety and the Petitions Committee. He was additionally a substitute member of the Committee on Economic Cooperation and Development and the Parliamentary Advisory Council for Sustainable Development. Additionally, he served as the environmental policy spokesperson for his Party.

Overall, his work focusses on environmental protection, sustainable development, advocating against resource waste and supporting the protection of water quality and improved mobility solutions.

=== Private life ===
After living in Westerstede for more than 20 years, he moved to Aachen in 2019.
