= Sarah Sorge =

German politician

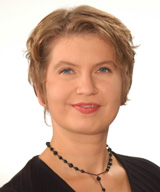
Sarah Sorge.

Sarah Sorge (born 26 August 1969 in Frankfurt) is a German politician. She is a member of Alliance 90 a member of the German green party, and has been a representative for the state parliament of Hesse since 2001. Sorge studied political science from 1989 to 1997 at the University of Frankfurt. She has been a member of Alliance '90/The Greens since 1993, and was an active member of the Green Youth.
