= Jan Ovelgönne =

German politician (born 1975)

Jan Ovelgönne MEP
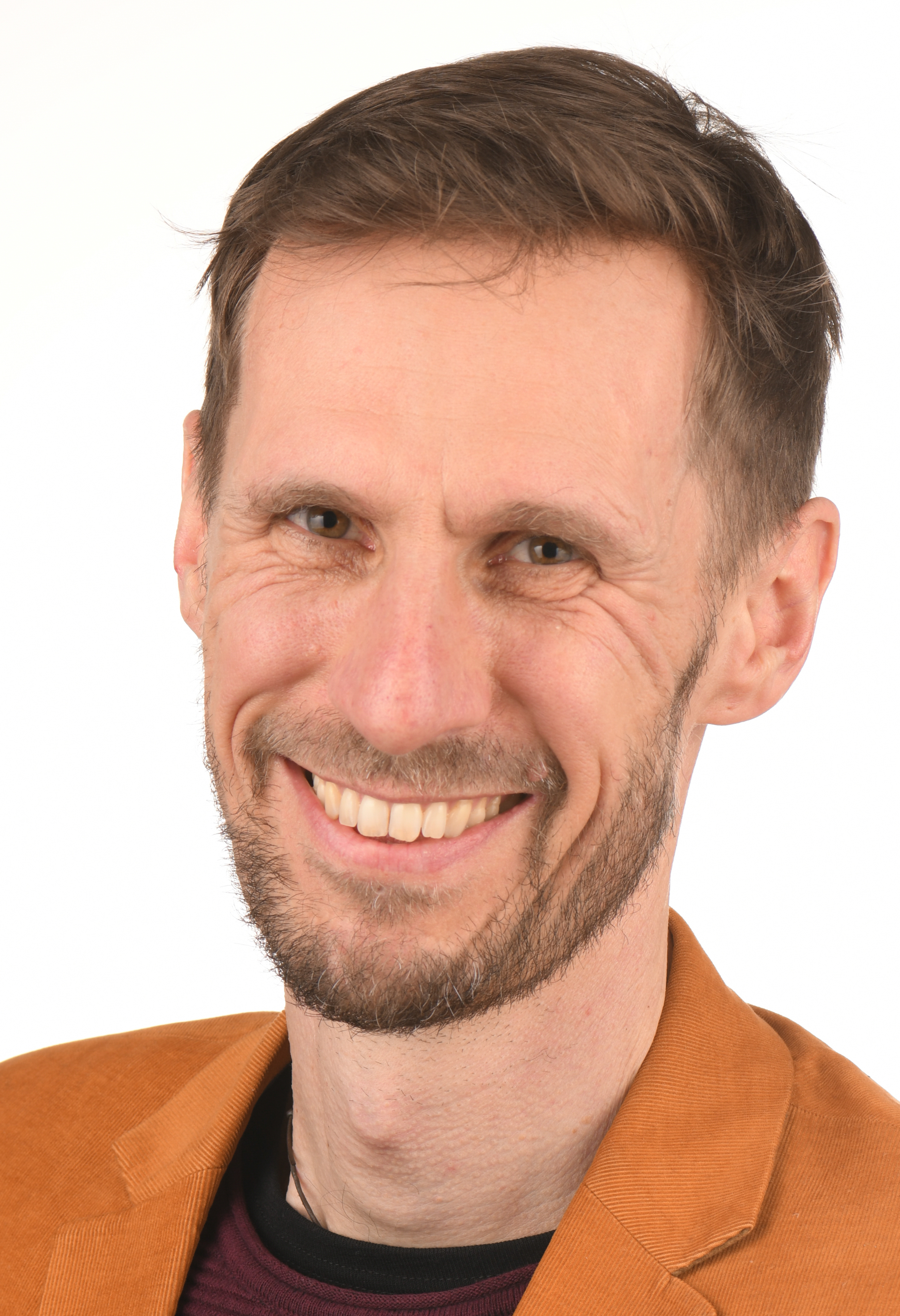

Member of the European Parliament
- In office 12 March 2024 – 15 July 2024
- Preceded by: Malte Gallée
- Constituency: Germany

Personal details
- Born: 30 June 1975 (age 50) Volkach, Bavaria, West Germany
- Party: Alliance 90/The Greens

Jan Henrik Ovelgönne (born 30 June 1975) is a German politician of Alliance 90/The Greens, who served as a Member of the European Parliament from 12 March to 15 July 2024. Born in Volkach, Bavaria, and resident in Arnsberg, North Rhine-Westphalia, he was 24th in his party's list for the 2019 European Parliament election in Germany.
