= Berat Gürbüz =

German politician (born 2002)

Member of the Landtag of Baden-Württemberg
- Incumbent
- Assumed office 11 May 2026

Personal details
- Born: 2002 (age 23–24)
- Party: Alliance 90/The Greens

Berat Gürbüz (born 2002) is a German politician who was elected member of the Landtag of Baden-Württemberg in 2026. From 2022 to 2024, he served as chairman of the Landesschülerbeirat.
