= Franziska Krumwiede-Steiner =

German politician (born 1985)

Member of the Bundestag
- Incumbent
- Assumed office 4 March 2024

Personal details
- Born: 23 July 1985 (age 40)
- Party: Alliance 90/The Greens

Franziska Krumwiede-Steiner (born 23 July 1985) is a German politician from the Alliance 90/The Greens. She has been a Member of the German Bundestag since March 2024.

== Life ==
Krumwiede-Steiner was born in Ingolstadt. After completing her general university entrance qualification in 2006, she initially studied German and history to become a teacher at the Catholic University of Eichstätt-Ingolstadt for two semesters before moving to the Ruhr University in Bochum, where she received a Bachelor of Arts in the subjects in 2009 German studies and history. In 2011 she completed her studies with a Master of Education. In 2017, Krumwiede-Steiner received her doctorate from the Faculty of Philology at the Ruhr University Bochum and received the grade magna cum laude for her dissertation on the topic “Forms and functions of orality in contemporary literature of the 'Sinti and Roma' magna cum laude. Since her 2nd state examination in 2022, Krumwiede-Steiner has worked as a teacher at a comprehensive school in Mülheim an der Ruhr.

Krumwiede-Steiner is married and is the mother of two daughters. She lives in Mülheim an der Ruhr. The politician Agnes Krumwiede is her sister.

== Politics ==
In the 2017 federal election, Krumwiede-Steiner ran for the first time in the Mülheim – Essen I federal constituency for Alliance 90/The Greens. She received 6.2 percent of the initial votes and therefore did not make it into the Bundestag. Krumwiede-Steiner also ran in Mülheim – Essen I in the federal election in the 2021 federal election and was able to significantly improve her result to 14.1 percent. However, she again failed to gain direct entry into the Bundestag. She was placed 29th on the state list of Alliance 90/The Greens in North Rhine-Westphalia for the 2021 German federal election, but initially missed a mandate. Only with the result of the partial repeat election on February 11, 2024, in Berlin was she able to win a mandate in the German Bundestag, which she took up on 4 March 2024. In the 2025 German federal election, she was the direct candidate in Oberhausen – Wesel III.

Since the local elections in 2014, Krumwiede-Steiner has represented Alliance 90/The Greens in the city council of Mülheim an der Ruhr. She has been on the state board of the Heinrich Böll Foundation in North Rhine-Westphalia since 2018.
