= Madeleine Linke =

German politician (born 1992)

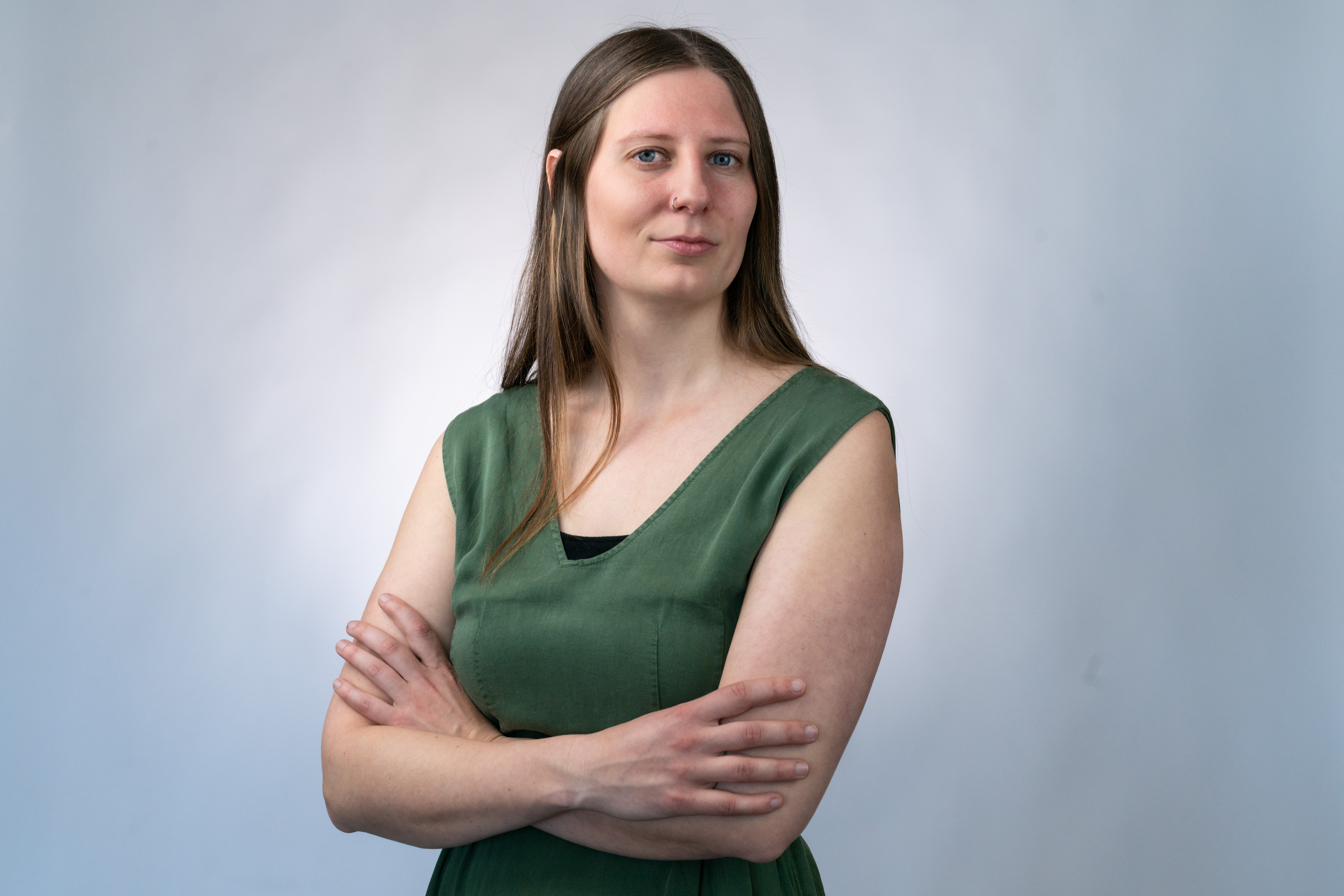
- Linke in 2021

Member of the Landtag of Saxony-Anhalt
- Incumbent
- Assumed office 6 October 2026

Personal details
- Born: 14 October 1992 (age 33)
- Party: Alliance 90/The Greens (since 2018)

Madeleine Linke (born 14 October 1992) is a German politician who was elected member of the Landtag of Saxony-Anhalt in 2026. From 2021 to 2025, she served as co-chair of Alliance 90/The Greens in Saxony-Anhalt.
