= Christoph Sippel =

German politician (born 1997)

Member of the Landtag of Hesse
- Incumbent
- Assumed office 18 January 2024

Personal details
- Born: 22 June 1997 (age 29) Homberg (Efze)
- Party: Alliance 90/The Greens (since 2013)

Christoph Sippel (born 22 June 1997 in Homberg (Efze)) is a German politician serving as a member of the Landtag of Hesse since 2024. He has served as co-chairman of Alliance 90/The Greens in the Schwalm-Eder-Kreis since 2024.
