= Agnes Krumwiede =

German pianist and politician (born 1977)

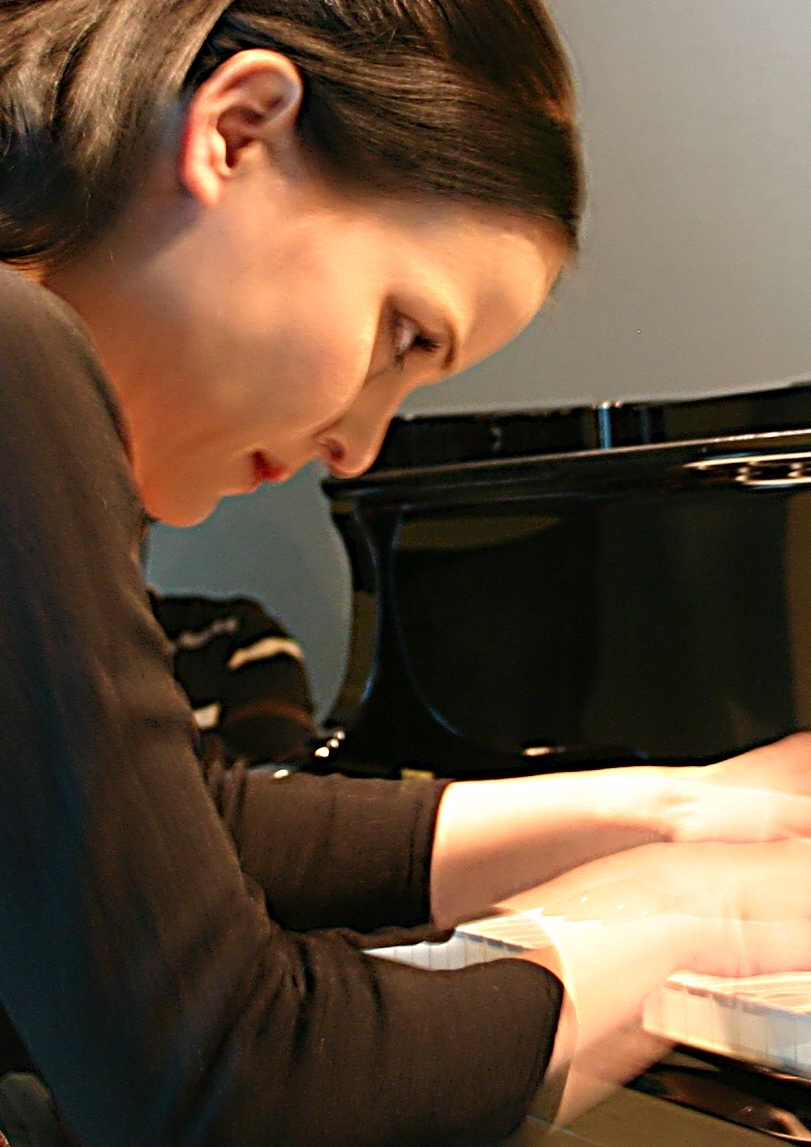
- Krumwiede in 2009

Member of the Bundestag
- In office 27 October 2009 – 22 October 2013

Personal details
- Born: 17 January 1977 (age 49) Neuburg an der Donau, West Germany (now Germany)
- Party: Greens
- Relations: Franziska Krumwiede-Steiner (sister)
- Children: 1

Agnes Krumwiede (born 17 January 1977) is a German pianist and politician of the Alliance 90/The Greens. From 2009 to 2013, she served as a member of the Bundestag and spokeswoman for cultural policy for the parliamentary group of the Greens.

== Life and career ==
=== Education and personal life ===
Krumwiede is a pianist and a qualified musician with a concert exam. She ran a piano school in Ingolstadt until 2009 and worked as a freelance concert pianist and song accompanist. She also worked as a freelancer for Bayerischer Rundfunk and Donaukurier.

Krumwiede is single, lives in Ingolstadt and has a son with politician Stephan Kühn. Her sister Franziska Krumwiede-Steiner is also a Member of the German Bundestag.

=== Political career ===
Krumwiede has been a member of the Greens party since 2001. She is a founding member of the Green Youth in Ingolstadt and was a scholarship holder of the party-affiliated Heinrich Böll Foundation during her studies. In 2002 and 2008, she ran for the city council in Ingolstadt and in 2003 she was a candidate for the state list in the Bavarian state elections. In the 2009 Bundestag election she ran as a direct candidate in the Ingolstadt constituency and received 8.2% of the first votes. She was elected into the Bundestag via Landeslistenplatz 9. There, she was spokeswoman for cultural policy of the parliamentary group of the Greens and chairwoman of the parliamentary group in the committee for culture and media. Krumwiede lost her seat in the 2013 federal election, thus missing re-entry into parliament.

== In film ==
In Nancy Brandt's film "The Elected", Krumwiede was one of five young MPs who were accompanied in a long-term film study during their first legislative period from 2009 to 2013.
