= Evrim Camuz =

German politician (born 1988)

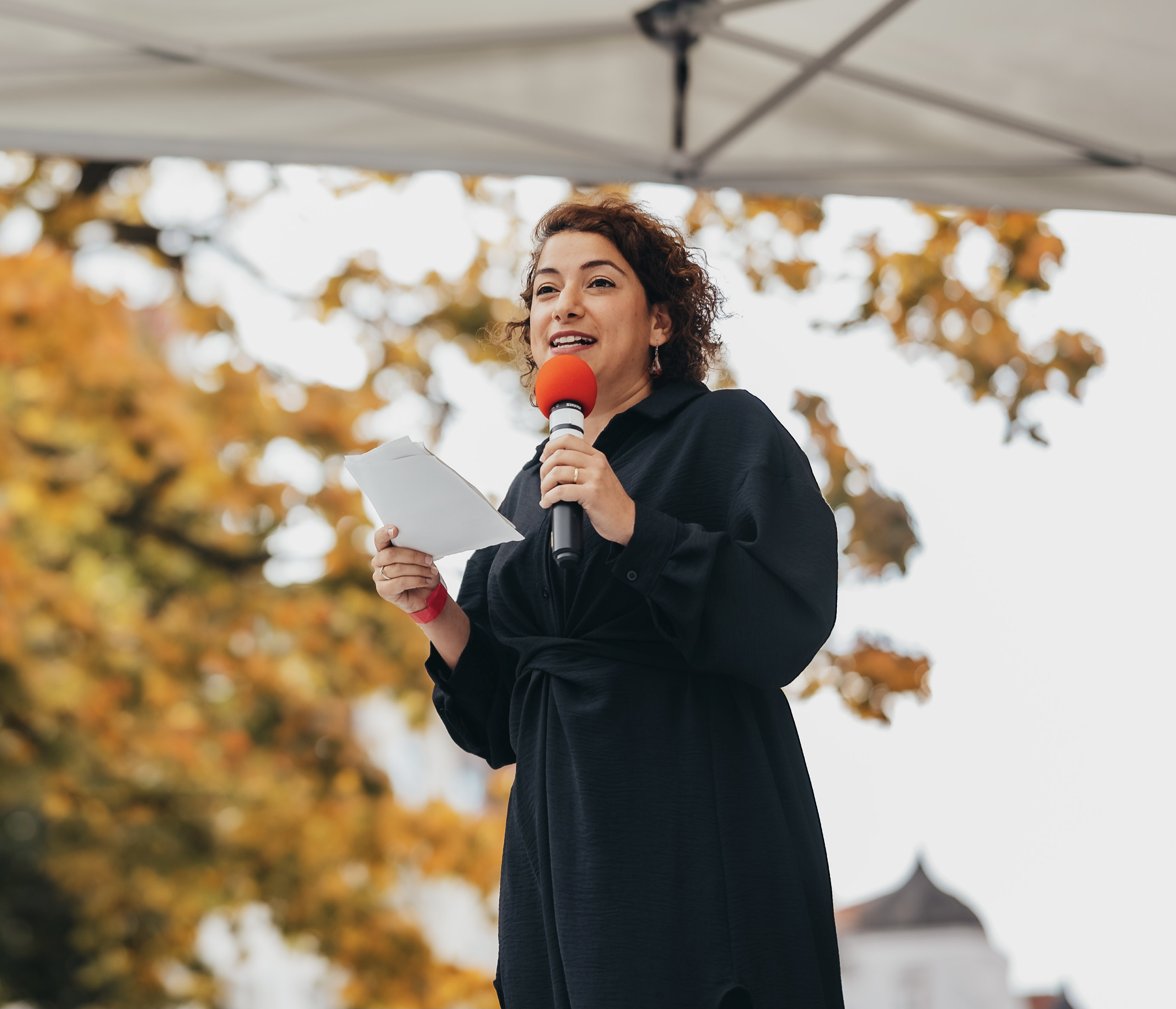
- Camuz in 2022

Member of the Landtag of Lower Saxony
- Incumbent
- Assumed office 8 November 2022

Personal details
- Born: 28 March 1988 (age 38) Ibbenbüren
- Party: Alliance 90/The Greens (since 2011)

Evrim Camuz (born 28 March 1988 in Ibbenbüren) is a German politician serving as a member of the Landtag of Lower Saxony since 2022. She has served as secretary of the Landtag since 2023.
