= Max Deisenhofer =

German politician (born 1987)

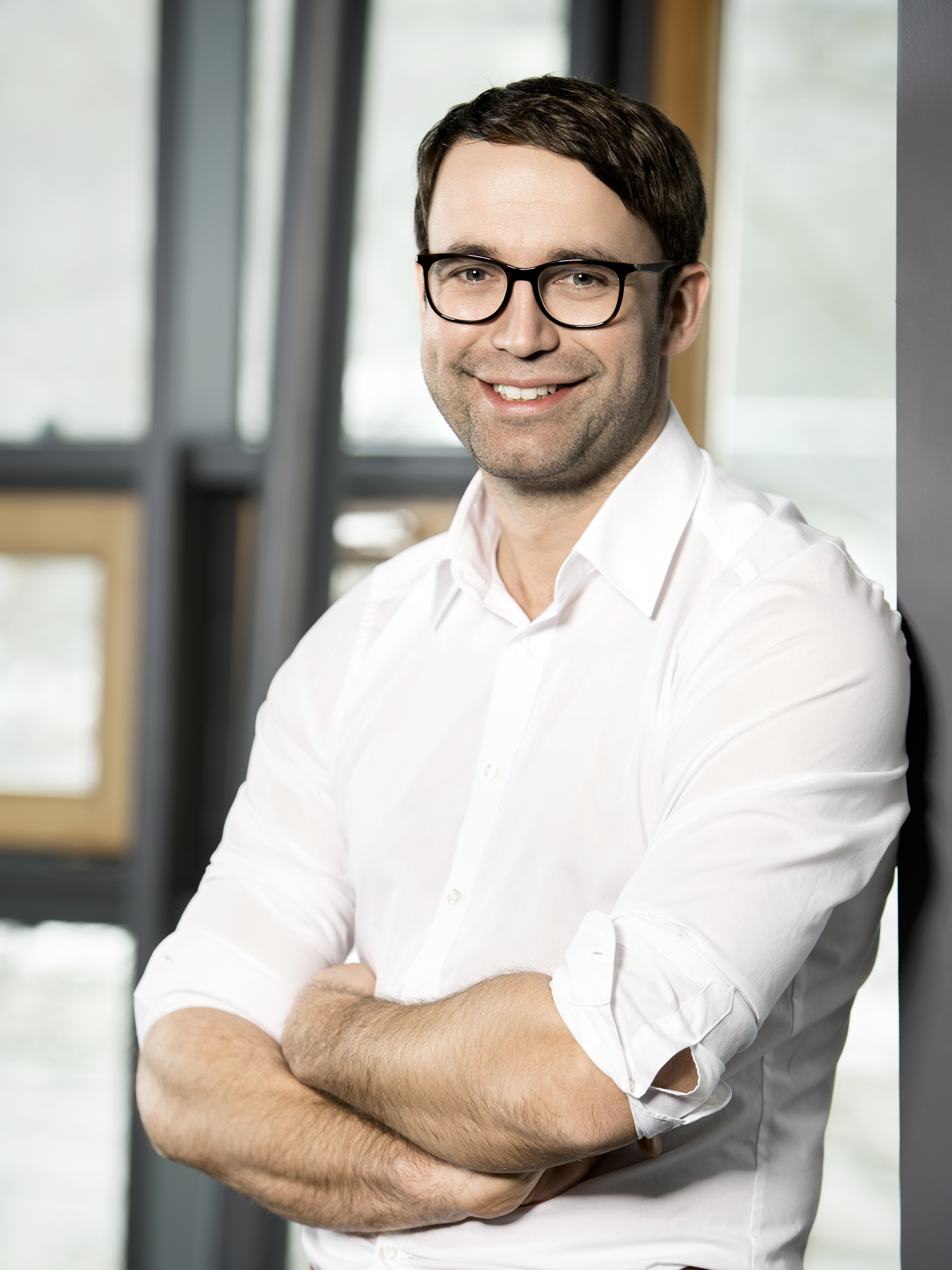
- Deisenhofer in 2018

Member of the Landtag of Bavaria
- Incumbent
- Assumed office 5 November 2018
- Constituency: Swabia

Personal details
- Born: 13 March 1987 (age 39) Krumbach, Bavaria
- Party: Alliance 90/The Greens (since 2005)

Maximilian Deisenhofer (born 13 March 1987 in Krumbach, Bavaria) is a German politician serving as a member of the Landtag of Bavaria since 2018. From 2014 to 2018, he served as chairman of Alliance 90/The Greens in Swabia.
