= Saskia Weishaupt =

German politician

Saskia Weishaupt (born 20 September 1993) is a German politician of Alliance 90/The Greens who served as a member of the Bundestag from 2021 to 2025.

== Early life ==
Weishaupt was born 1994 in the German city of Hanover and studied politics.

== Career ==
Weishaupt was elected to the Bundestag in 2021.

In a tweet on 22 December 2021, Weishaupt called on the police to use pepper spray and batons against a Querdenker demonstration in Munich. The demonstration had been cancelled by the organisers. Nevertheless, up to 5,000 participants gathered. Eleven arrests were made. In response to Weishaupt's tweet, the hashtag #SchlagstockSaskia (transl. #BatonSaskia) trended on Twitter, with predominantly right-wing criticism from AfD member of parliament Jürgen Braun, among others. Police unionist Manuel Ostermann from Münsterland also criticised Green politician Weishaupt's tweet: "I dread to see you take responsibility. Arm yourself rhetorically. It's obviously about time." Weishaupt deleted her tweet and apologised, saying she "unfortunately had not been able to present the context in the tweet."

As of October 2026, Weishaupt serves on the Greens' Lower Saxony state executive board.
