= Parlamentarische Linke =

Parliamentary Left Parlamentarische Linke
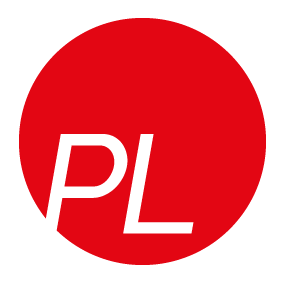
- Spokesperson: Dagmar Schmidt; Wiebke Esdar; Carmen Wegge
- Treasurer: Hakan Demir
- Founded: 1972; 54 years ago (Leverkusener Kreis); 1980; 46 years ago (Parliamentary Left)
- Ideology: Social democracy Keynesianism
- Political position: Centre-left to left-wing
- National affiliation: Social Democratic Party of Germany
- Seats in the SPD Bundestag group: 90 / 206
- Seats in the Bundestag: 90 / 736
- Ministers: 2 / 17
- Parliamentary State Secretaries: 5 / 37

Website
- parlamentarische-linke.de

The Parlamentarische Linke (English: Parliamentary Left, abbreviated PL) is a platform within the Social Democratic Party of Germany (SPD)'s Bundestag group. As of 2025, 90 of the group's 206 members belong to the Parliamentary Left, making it the second largest of the three extant platforms in the SPD group, after the Seeheimer Kreis and before the Berlin Netzwerk. The Parliamentary Left represents social democratic to left-wing positions within the party.

== Profile ==
The Parliamentary Left describes itself as "an association of social democratic members of the Bundestag". It represents the left wing of the Social Democratic Party, "advoca[ting] for freedom, equality and social progress". Their principles are essentially based on the party program that existed until the 1990s. To this end, the platform supports Keynesian approaches to economic and social policy. They were critical of the largely supply-side Agenda 2010 reforms of Gerhard Schröder's government, but officially called for their amendment rather than repeal.

In the area of tax policy, the PL call for a higher inheritance tax and the reintroduction of the wealth tax. They reject proposals for a strict limitation of the national debt, and opposed the introduction of the debt brake. They support efforts to combat climate change, including internationally-agreed climate targets, strong investment in renewable energy, and changes to subsidies and taxes for this purpose. In light of the record debt taken on by the federal government during the COVID-19 pandemic in Germany, the PL advocates a long-term move away from balanced budget principles, pushing for public investment in education, digitisation, and climate.

The Parliamentary Left favours closer ties with the Greens and The Left and the development of red-red-green coalitions; the first such coalition in a western state was formed in 2019 under the leadership of Carsten Sieling, former speaker of the Parliamentary Left. The Left became the leading member of a governing coalition for the first time in the eastern state of Thuringia after the 2014 state election, alongside the SPD and Greens.

== Organisation ==
Position	Member(s)	
Speakers	Wiebke Esdar, Dagmar Schmidt, and Carmen Wegge	
Treasurer	Hakan Demir	
Steering Committee	Tanja Machalet; Oliver Kaczmarek; Jakob Blankenburg; Frauke Heiligenstadt	Ralf Stegner; Annika Klose; Heike Heubach; Jürgen Coße

== History ==
The Parliamentary Left finds its origins in the "Group of the 16th Floor" (German: Gruppe der 16. Etage, founded by 21 mostly young SPD Bundestag members in October 1969. This group was associated with the Extra-Parliamentary Opposition and pushed for reform within the SPD parliamentary group. The modern platform was officially founded in 1972, then known as the Leverkusener Kreis (Leverkusener Circle). It was refounded as the Parliamentary Left in 1980.

=== Spokespersons ===
Portrait	Name	Term start	Term end
	Michael Müller (born 1948)	1998	2006
	Ernst Dieter Rossmann (born 1951)	2006	2014
	Carsten Sieling (born 1959)	2014	2015
	Matthias Miersch (born 1968)	2015	2022
	Matthias Miersch, Sönke Rix and Wiebke Esdar	2022	

== Members ==
The following is a list of members of the Parliamentary Left as of January 2022.

- Sanae Abdi
- Adis Ahmetovic
- Reem Alabali-Radovan
- Niels Annen
- Ulrike Bahr
- Bärbel Bas
- Jürgen Berghahn
- Bengt Bergt
- Jakob Blankenburg
- Leni Breymaier
- Jürgen Coße
- Bernhard Daldrup
- Hakan Demir
- Karamba Diaby
- Martin Diedenhofen
- Jan Dieren
- Felix Döring
- Axel Echeverria
- Heike Engelhardt
- Wiebke Esdar
- Saskia Esken
- Yasmin Fahimi
- Fabian Funke
- Angelika Glöckner
- Timon Gremmels
- Uli Grötsch
- Bettina Hagedorn
- Rita Hagl-Kehl
- Frauke Heiligenstadt
- Gabriela Heinrich
- Markus Hümpfer
- Oliver Kaczmarek
- Elisabeth Kaiser
- Carlos Kasper
- Anna Kassautzki
- Rainer Keller
- Cansel Kiziltepe
- Helmut Kleebank
- Annika Klose
- Tim Klüssendorf
- Bärbel Kofler
- Martin Kröber
- Kevin Kühnert
- Sarah Lahrkamp
- Karl Lauterbach
- Helge Lindh
- Tanja Machalet
- Erik von Malottki
- Holger Mann
- Kaweh Mansoori
- Zanda Martens
- Franziska Mascheck
- Andreas Mehltretter
- Robin Mesarosch
- Matthias Miersch
- Bettina Müller
- Rolf Mützenich
- Rasha Nasr
- Dietmar Nietan
- Josephine Ortleb
- Mathias Papendieck
- Natalie Pawlik
- Jens Peick
- Christian Petry
- Jan Plobner
- Andreas Rimkus
- Sönke Rix
- Sebastian Roloff
- Jessica Rosenthal
- Michael Roth
- Tina Rudolph
- Bernd Rützel
- Sarah Ryglewski
- Axel Schäfer
- Nina Scheer
- Dagmar Schmidt
- Daniel Schneider
- Johannes Schraps
- Michael Schrodi
- Svenja Schulze
- Frank Schwabe
- Stefan Schwartze
- Svenja Stadler
- Martina Stamm-Fibich
- Ralf Stegner
- Mathias Stein
- Nadja Sthamer
- Ruppert Stüwe
- Claudia Tausend
- Derya Türk-Nachbaur
- Carolin Wagner
- Carmen Wegge
- Melanie Wegling
- Gülistan Yüksel
- Katrin Zschau
