= Jessica Rosenthal =

German politician

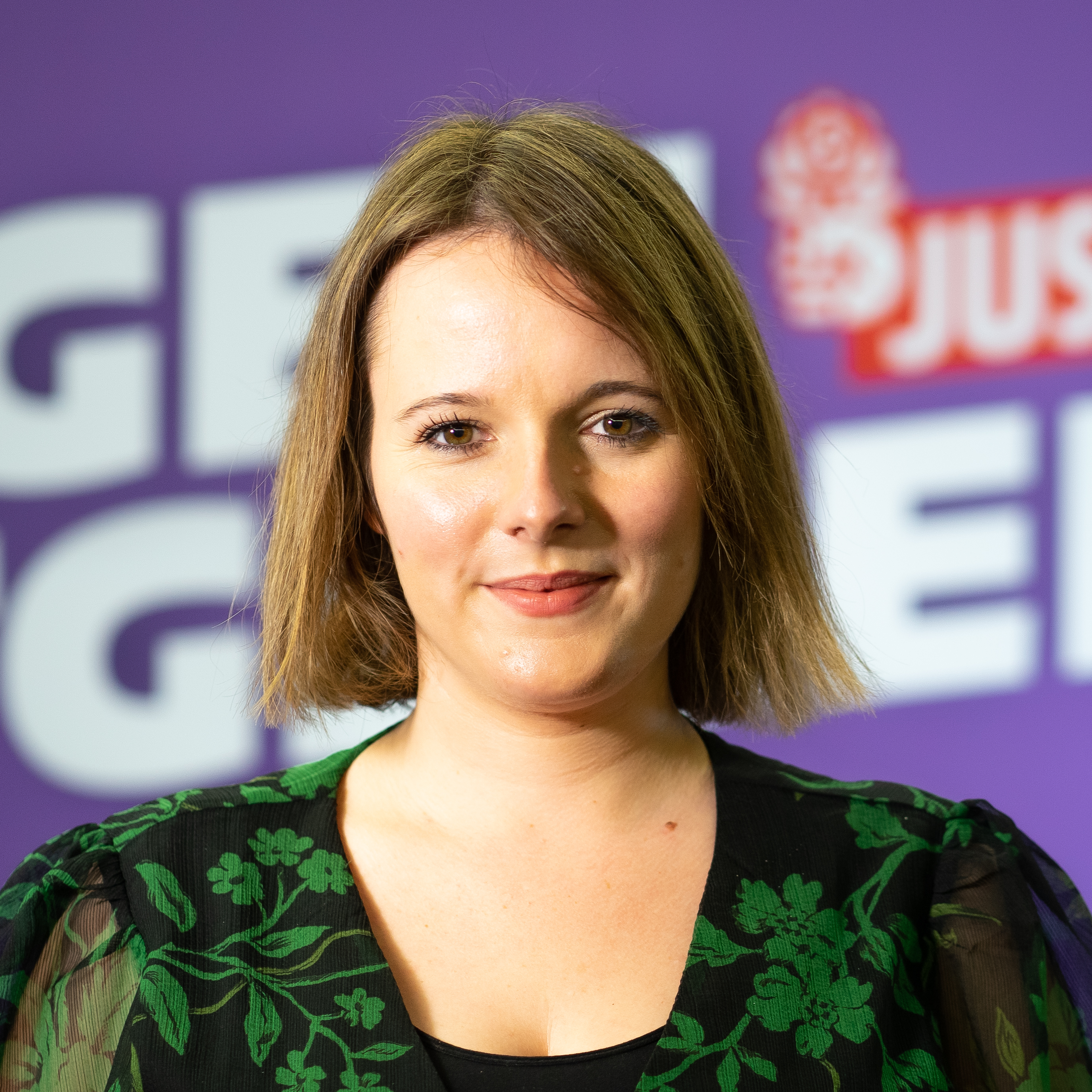
- Rosenthal in 2021

Member of the Bundestag
- Incumbent
- Assumed office 26 October 2021

Chairwoman of the Jusos
- In office 8 January 2021 – 17 November 2025
- Preceded by: Kevin Kühnert
- Succeeded by: Philipp Türmer

Personal details
- Born: 28 October 1992 (age 34) Hamelin, Lower Saxony
- Party: Social Democratic Party of Germany
- Education: University of Bonn
- Occupation: School teacher Politician

Jessica Rosenthal (born 28 October 1992) is a German politician of the Social Democratic Party (SPD) who has been a member of the Bundestag since 2021, representing the Bonn district.

== Early life ==
Rosenthal was born 1992 in Hameln. From 2011 to 2012 she served as a volunteer at Care Deutschland-Luxemburg in Bonn. She studied teaching.

== Political career ==
Rosenthal joined the SPD, and therefore was automatically enrolled in the Young Socialists in the SPD (Jusos), in 2013. In January 2021, she was elected chairwoman of Jusos.

Rosenthal was elected to the Bundestag in 2021. In the negotiations to form a so-called traffic light coalition of the SPD, the Green Party and the Free Democrats (FDP) following elections, she was part of her party's delegation in the working group on education policy, co-chaired by Andreas Stoch, Felix Banaszak and Jens Brandenburg.

In parliament, Rosenthal has since been serving on the Committee on Education, Research and Technology Assessment. Within her own parliamentary group, she is part of a working group on migration and integration.

Since January 2023, Rosenthal has been serving on an internal SPD commission on tax reform, co-chaired by Saskia Esken and Lars Klingbeil.

In 2023, Rosenthal announced that she would not run again as chairwoman of the Jusos and instead focus on her pregnancy.

== Other activities ==
- Bonn International Award for Democracy, Member of the Board of Trustees (since 2022)
- Federal Agency for Civic Education, Alternate Member of the Board of Trustees (since 2022)
- Haus der Geschichte, Member of the Board of Trustees (since 2022)
- Education and Science Workers' Union (GEW), Member

== Political positions ==
Amid the 2022 Russian invasion of Ukraine, Rosenthal opposed the Scholz government's effort to change Germany’s constitution to allow for a credit-based special defense fund of 100 billion euros ($107.35 billion).
