= Oliver Kaczmarek =

German politician

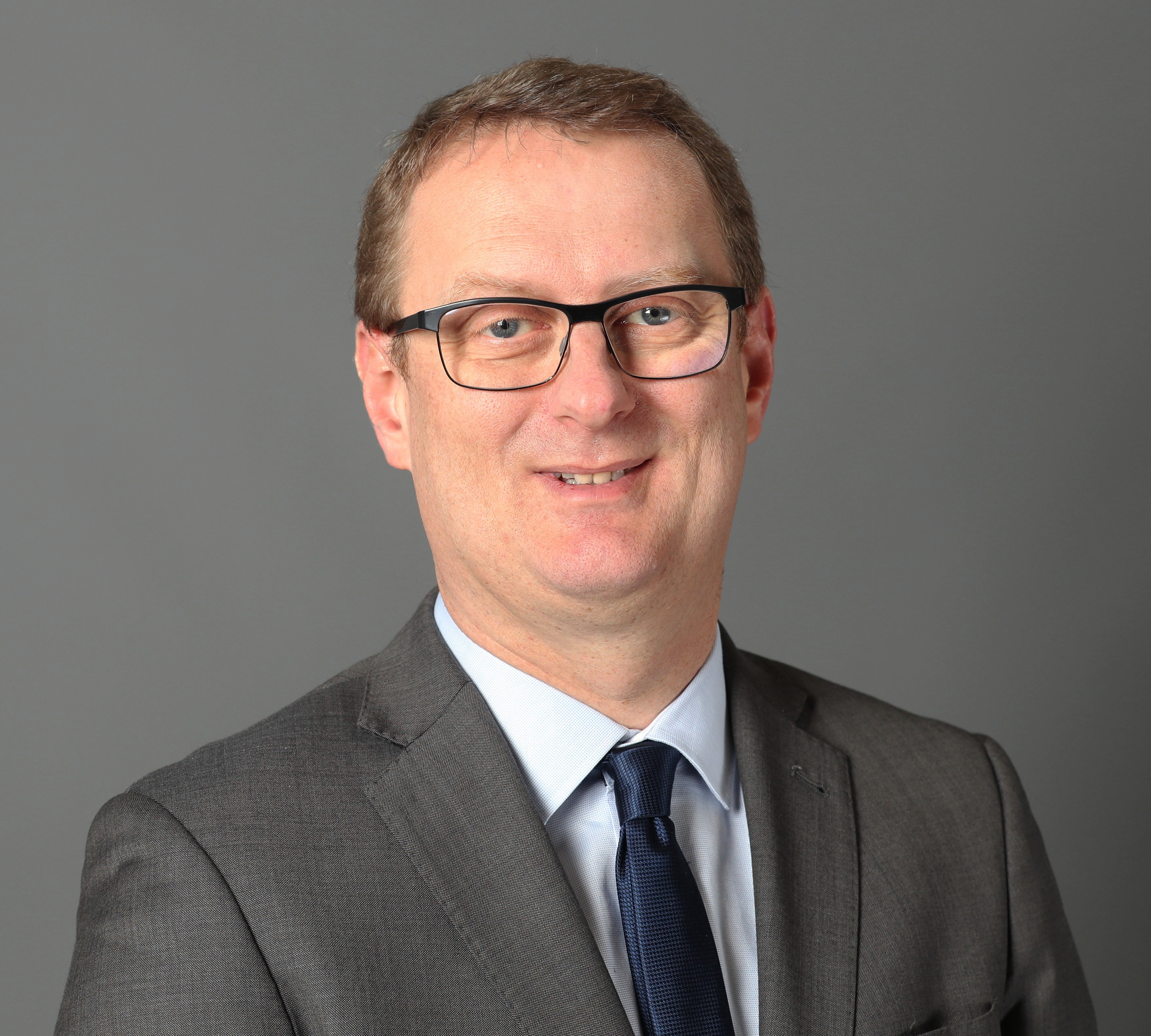
- Kaczmarek in 2020

Member of the Bundestag
- Incumbent
- Assumed office 2009
- Preceded by: Rolf Stöckel

Personal details
- Born: 8 August 1970 (age 56) Kamen, West Germany (now Germany)
- Party: SPD
- Education: Ruhr University Bochum

Oliver Kaczmarek (born 8 August 1970) is a German politician of the Social Democratic Party (SPD) who has been serving as a member of the Bundestag from the state of North Rhine-Westphalia since 2009.

== Political career ==
Kaczmarek first became a member of the Bundestag in the 2009 German federal election, representing the Unna district. He was a member of the Committee on the Environment, Nature Conservation, Building and Nuclear Safety before moving to the Committee for Education, Research and Technology Assessment in 2011. Since 2018, he has been serving as his parliamentary group's spokesperson on education and research.

In addition to his committee assignments, Kaczmarek is part of the German-Belarusian Parliamentary Friendship Group. Within the SPD parliamentary group, he belongs to the Parliamentary Left, a left-wing movement.

In the negotiations to form a fourth coalition government under Chancellor Angela Merkel following the 2017 federal elections, Kaczmarek was part of the working group on education policy, led by Annegret Kramp-Karrenbauer, Stefan Müller and Hubertus Heil.

Kaczmarek co-chaired the SPD’s national conventions in Wiesbaden (2018) – during which the party elected Andrea Nahles as its first-ever female leader – and Berlin (2019).

In the negotiations to form a so-called traffic light coalition of the SPD, the Green Party and the Free Democrats (FDP) following the 2021 German elections, he was again part of his party's delegation in the working group on education policy, this time co-chaired by Andreas Stoch, Felix Banaszak and Jens Brandenburg.

== Other activities ==
- University of Hagen, Member of the Parliamentary Advisory Board (since 2022)
- Leibniz Association, Member of the Senate (since 2021)
- Business Forum of the Social Democratic Party of Germany, Member of the Political Advisory Board (since 2020)
- Studentenwerk, Member of the Board of Trustees (since 2014)
- German-Belarusian Society, Member of the Board
- spw – Zeitschrift für sozialistische Politik und Wirtschaft, Member of the Editorial Board
- Stiftung Lesen, Member of the Board of Trustees
- IG Bergbau, Chemie, Energie (IG BCE), Member
- German United Services Trade Union (ver.di), Member

== Political positions ==
In the SPD’s 2019 leadership election, Kaczmarek supported Klara Geywitz and Olaf Scholz.
