= Krefeld II – Wesel II =

Federal electoral district of Germany

113 Krefeld II – Wesel II
- Electoral district for the Bundestag
- Krefeld II – Wesel II in 2025
- State: North Rhine-Westphalia
- Population: 243,500 (2019)
- Electorate: 175,852 (2021)
- Major settlements: Krefeld (partial); Moers
- Area: 176.4 km^{2}

Current electoral district
- Created: 2002
- Party: CDU
- Member: Kerstin Radomski
- Elected: 2025

Krefeld II – Wesel II is an electoral constituency (German: Wahlkreis) represented in the Bundestag. It elects one member via first-past-the-post voting. Under the current constituency numbering system, it is designated as constituency 113. It is located in the Ruhr region of North Rhine-Westphalia, comprising the northern part of the city of Krefeld and the southern part of the district of Wesel.

Krefeld II – Wesel II was created for the 2002 federal election. From 2021 to 2025, it has been represented by Jan Dieren of the Social Democratic Party (SPD). Since 2025 it has been represented by Kerstin Radomski of the CDU.

== Geography ==
Krefeld II – Wesel II is located in the Ruhr region of North Rhine-Westphalia. As of the 2021 federal election, it comprises the Stadtbezirke of Nord, Hüls, Mitte, and Ost from the independent city of Krefeld and the municipalities of Moers and Neukirchen-Vluyn from the district of Wesel.

== History ==
Krefeld II – Wesel II was created in 2002 and contained parts of the abolished constituencies of Krefeld and Wesel II. In the 2002 through 2009 elections, it was constituency 115 in the numbering system. In the 2013 through 2021 elections, it was number 114. From the 2025 election, it has been number 113.

== Members ==
The constituency was first represented by Siegmund Ehrmann of the Social Democratic Party (SPD) from 2002 to 2017. It was won by Kerstin Radomski of the Christian Democratic Union (CDU) in the 2017 election. Jan Dieren regained it for the SPD in 2021. Radomski won back the seat in 2025.

Election	Member	Party	%
2002	Siegmund Ehrmann	SPD	51.5
2005	Siegmund Ehrmann	SPD	50.7
2009	Siegmund Ehrmann	SPD	49.6
2013	Siegmund Ehrmann	SPD	41.5
2017	Kerstin Radomski	CDU	36.8
2021	Jan Dieren	SPD	35.2
2025	Kerstin Radomski	CDU	32.0

== Election results ==
=== 2025 election ===
Federal election (2025): Krefeld II – Wesel II
Notes:	Blue background denotes the winner of the electorate vote. Pink background denotes a candidate elected from their party list. Yellow background denotes an electorate win by a list member, or other incumbent. A ✓ or ✗ denotes status of any incumbent, win or lose respectively.						
Party	Candidate	Votes	%	±%	Party votes	%	±%
CDU	Kerstin Radomski	44,412	32.0	▲3.5	40,194	28.8	▲4.1
SPD	✗ Jan Dieren	41,999	30.2	▼5.0	31,212	22.4	▼9.4
AfD	Hauke Finger	23,421	16.9	▲9.9	23,203	16.6	▲9.6
Greens	Ulle Schauws	12,133	8.7	▼4.6	15,368	11.0	▼3.9
Left	Edith Bartelmus-Scholich	8,552	6.2	▲3.0	11,210	8.0	▲4.4
BSW					6,128	4.4	
FDP	Florian Ott	4,841	3.5	▼4.9	6,629	4.8	▼6.7
Tierschutzpartei					1,927	1.4	▼0.1
FW	Stephan Töpfer	1,829	1.3	▲0.4	729	0.5	▼0.1
Volt	Benjamin Klappan	1,782	1.3		805	0.6	▲0.4
PARTEI				▼2.2	856	0.6	▼0.5
dieBasis				▼1.3	278	0.2	▼0.8
Team Todenhöfer					259	0.2	▼0.6
PdF					221	0.2	▲0.1
BD					155	0.1	
Values					81	0.1	
MERA25					71	0.1	
MLPD				▼0.1	65	0.1	0.0
Pirates							▼0.4
Gesundheitsforschung							▼0.1
Humanists							▲0.1
Bündnis C							▼0.1
ÖDP							▼0.1
SGP						0.0	0.0
Informal votes		1,253			831		
Total valid votes		138,969			139,391		
Turnout		140,222	80.9	▲6.0			
CDU gain from SPD	Majority	2,413	1.8				

=== 2021 election ===
Federal election (2021): Krefeld II – Wesel II
Notes:	Blue background denotes the winner of the electorate vote. Pink background denotes a candidate elected from their party list. Yellow background denotes an electorate win by a list member, or other incumbent. A ✓ or ✗ denotes status of any incumbent, win or lose respectively.						
Party	Candidate	Votes	%	±%	Party votes	%	±%
SPD	Jan Dieren	45,852	35.2	▲3.2	41,476	31.8	▲4.1
CDU	✗ Kerstin Radomski	37,033	28.4	▼8.5	32,316	24.7	▼6.2
Greens	Ulle Schauws	17,398	13.4	▲7.2	19,539	15.0	▲7.9
FDP	Michael Terwiesche	10,954	8.4	▲0.3	14,899	11.4	▼2.2
AfD	Hauke Finger	9,077	7.0	▼1.6	9,189	7.0	▼2.2
Left	Sebastian Schubert	4,100	3.1	▼2.5	4,703	3.6	▼4.0
Tierschutzpartei					1,915	1.5	▲0.8
PARTEI	Carsten Butterwegge	2,863	2.2	▲0.8	1,507	1.2	▲0.2
dieBasis	Lars Kosma	1,698	1.3		1,362	1.0	
Team Todenhöfer					969	0.7	
FW	Hans-Günther Schmitz	1,186	0.9		818	0.6	▲0.4
Pirates					506	0.4	▼0.1
Volt					232	0.2	
LIEBE					189	0.1	
Gesundheitsforschung					143	0.1	0.0
LfK					119	0.1	
Humanists					113	0.1	▲0.1
NPD					103	0.1	▼0.1
Bündnis C					88	0.1	
V-Partei3					89	0.1	0.0
MLPD	Genja Raboteau	125	0.1	▼0.1	78	0.1	0.0
du.					71	0.1	
ÖDP					70	0.1	0.0
PdF					41	0.0	
LKR					38	0.0	
DKP					27	0.0	0.0
SGP					16	0.0	0.0
Informal votes		1,378			1,048		
Total valid votes		130,286			130,616		
Turnout		131,664	74.9	▲0.2			
SPD gain from CDU	Majority	8,819	6.8				

=== 2017 election ===
Federal election (2017): Krefeld II – Wesel II
Notes:	Blue background denotes the winner of the electorate vote. Pink background denotes a candidate elected from their party list. Yellow background denotes an electorate win by a list member, or other incumbent. A ✓ or ✗ denotes status of any incumbent, win or lose respectively.						
Party	Candidate	Votes	%	±%	Party votes	%	±%
CDU	Kerstin Radomski	48,817	37.0	▼3.2	40,955	30.9	▼6.0
SPD	Elke Buttkereit	42,219	32.0	▼9.5	36,714	27.7	▼6.9
AfD	Peter Müller	11,294	8.5		12,186	9.2	▲5.3
FDP	Florian Philipp Ott	10,769	8.2	▲5.6	18,032	13.6	▲8.0
Greens	Ulle Schauws	8,063	6.1	▲0.8	9,307	7.0	▼0.3
Left	Manfred Büddemann	7,418	5.6	▲0.2	10,090	7.6	▲1.0
PARTEI	Richard Jörg Jansen	1,846	1.4	▲0.9	1,248	0.9	▲0.5
Tierschutzpartei					946	0.7	
Pirates	Jochen Lobnig	1,433	1.1	▼1.3	663	0.5	▼1.6
AD-DEMOKRATEN					559	0.5	
FW					319	0.2	▼0.1
NPD					251	0.2	▼0.9
BGE					178	0.1	
DM					164	0.1	
DiB					143	0.1	
V-Partei³					125	0.1	
MLPD	Elisabeth Wannenmacher	238	0.2	0.0	120	0.1	0.0
ÖDP					111	0.1	0.0
Volksabstimmung					110	0.1	▼0.1
Gesundheitsforschung					109	0.1	
Die Humanisten					47	0.0	
DKP					33	0.0	
SGP					10	0.0	0.0
Informal votes		1,608			1,175		
Total valid votes		132,097			132,530		
Turnout		133,705	74.6	▲2.8			
CDU gain from SPD	Majority	6,598	5.0				

=== 2013 election ===
Federal election (2013): Krefeld II – Wesel II
Notes:	Blue background denotes the winner of the electorate vote. Pink background denotes a candidate elected from their party list. Yellow background denotes an electorate win by a list member, or other incumbent. A ✓ or ✗ denotes status of any incumbent, win or lose respectively.						
Party	Candidate	Votes	%	±%	Party votes	%	±%
SPD	✓ Siegmund Ehrmann	53,578	41.5	▲1.9	44,856	34.6	▲2.6
CDU	Kerstin Radomski	51,835	40.1	▲5.0	47,806	36.9	▲6.6
Left	Gabriele Kaenders	6,994	5.4	▼2.5	8,546	6.6	▼2.3
Greens	Ulle Schauws	6,888	5.3	▼2.1	9,485	7.3	▼2.6
FDP	Michael Terwiesche	3,245	2.5	▼6.2	7,237	5.6	▼8.6
AfD					5,085	3.9	
Pirates	Peter Klein	3,040	2.4		2,739	2.1	▲0.5
NPD	Philippe Bodewig	2,039	1.6	▲0.5	1,463	1.1	▲0.3
PARTEI		620	0.5		534	0.4	
PRO					404	0.3	
FW		730	0.6		402	0.3	
Volksabstimmung					222	0.2	▲0.1
REP					166	0.1	▼0.1
BIG					143	0.1	
ÖDP					126	0.1	0.0
MLPD	Klaus Wallenstein	268	0.2	0.0	110	0.1	0.0
Nichtwahler					109	0.1	
Party of Reason					106	0.1	
RRP					74	0.1	▼0.1
BüSo					30	0.0	0.0
PSG					27	0.0	0.0
Die Rechte					26	0.0	
Informal votes		1,948			1,489		
Total valid votes		129,237			129,696		
Turnout		131,185	71.8	▲1.0			
SPD hold	Majority	1,743	1.4	▼3.1			

=== 2009 election ===
Federal election (2009): Krefeld II – Wesel II
Notes:	Blue background denotes the winner of the electorate vote. Pink background denotes a candidate elected from their party list. Yellow background denotes an electorate win by a list member, or other incumbent. A ✓ or ✗ denotes status of any incumbent, win or lose respectively.						
Party	Candidate	Votes	%	±%	Party votes	%	±%
SPD	✓ Siegmund Ehrmann	50,636	39.6	▼11.2	40,990	32.0	▼11.9
CDU	Kerstin Radomski	44,906	35.1	▼1.3	38,812	30.3	▼0.3
FDP	Michael Terwiesche	11,098	8.7	▲4.4	18,168	14.2	▲4.1
Left	Wolfgang Klinger	10,123	7.9	▲4.0	11,438	8.9	▲3.8
Greens	Ulle Schauws	9,462	7.4	▲3.7	12,727	9.9	▲2.2
Pirates					2,078	1.6	
NPD	Matthias Halmanns	1,425	1.1	▲0.2	1,091	0.9	▲0.1
Tierschutzpartei					841	0.7	▲0.1
FAMILIE					535	0.4	0.0
RENTNER					446	0.3	
REP					308	0.2	▼0.1
RRP					187	0.1	
MLPD	Klaus Wallenstein	270	0.2		108	0.1	0.0
Volksabstimmung					102	0.1	0.0
DVU					76	0.1	
ÖDP					76	0.1	
Centre					72	0.1	0.0
BüSo					21	0.0	0.0
PSG					20	0.0	0.0
Informal votes		1,681			1,412		
Total valid votes		127,920			128,189		
Turnout		129,601	70.9	▼7.3			
SPD hold	Majority	5,730	4.5	▼9.9			

=== 2005 election ===
Federal election (2005): Krefeld II – Wesel II
Notes:	Blue background denotes the winner of the electorate vote. Pink background denotes a candidate elected from their party list. Yellow background denotes an electorate win by a list member, or other incumbent. A ✓ or ✗ denotes status of any incumbent, win or lose respectively.						
Party	Candidate	Votes	%	±%	Party votes	%	±%
SPD	✓ Siegmund Ehrmann	71,413	50.7	▼0.48	61,757	43.8	▼2.8
CDU	Karin Meincke	51,285	36.4	▲2.2	43,053	30.6	▼0.48
FDP	Michael Terwiesche	6,006	4.3	▼2.6	14,161	10.1	▲0.8
Left	Sevim Dagdelen	5,564	4.0	▲2.8	7,209	5.1	▲3.9
Greens	Philipp Küpperbusch	5,168	3.7	▼1.6	10,897	7.7	▼1.3
NPD	Bernd Schiller	1,291	0.9		994	0.7	▲0.5
Tierschutzpartei					721	0.5	▲0.1
GRAUEN					602	0.4	▲0.1
Familie					545	0.4	▲0.2
REP					451	0.3	▲0.1
PBC					134	0.1	
From Now on... Democracy Through Referendum					117	0.1	
MLPD					91	0.1	
Socialist Equality Party					60	0.0	
Centre					43	0.0	
BüSo					23	0.0	0.0
Informal votes		2,077			1,946		
Total valid votes		140,727			140,858		
Turnout		142,804	78.1	▼1.6			
SPD hold	Majority	20,128	14.3				
