= Franziska Brantner =

German politician (born 1979)

Franziska Brantner MdB
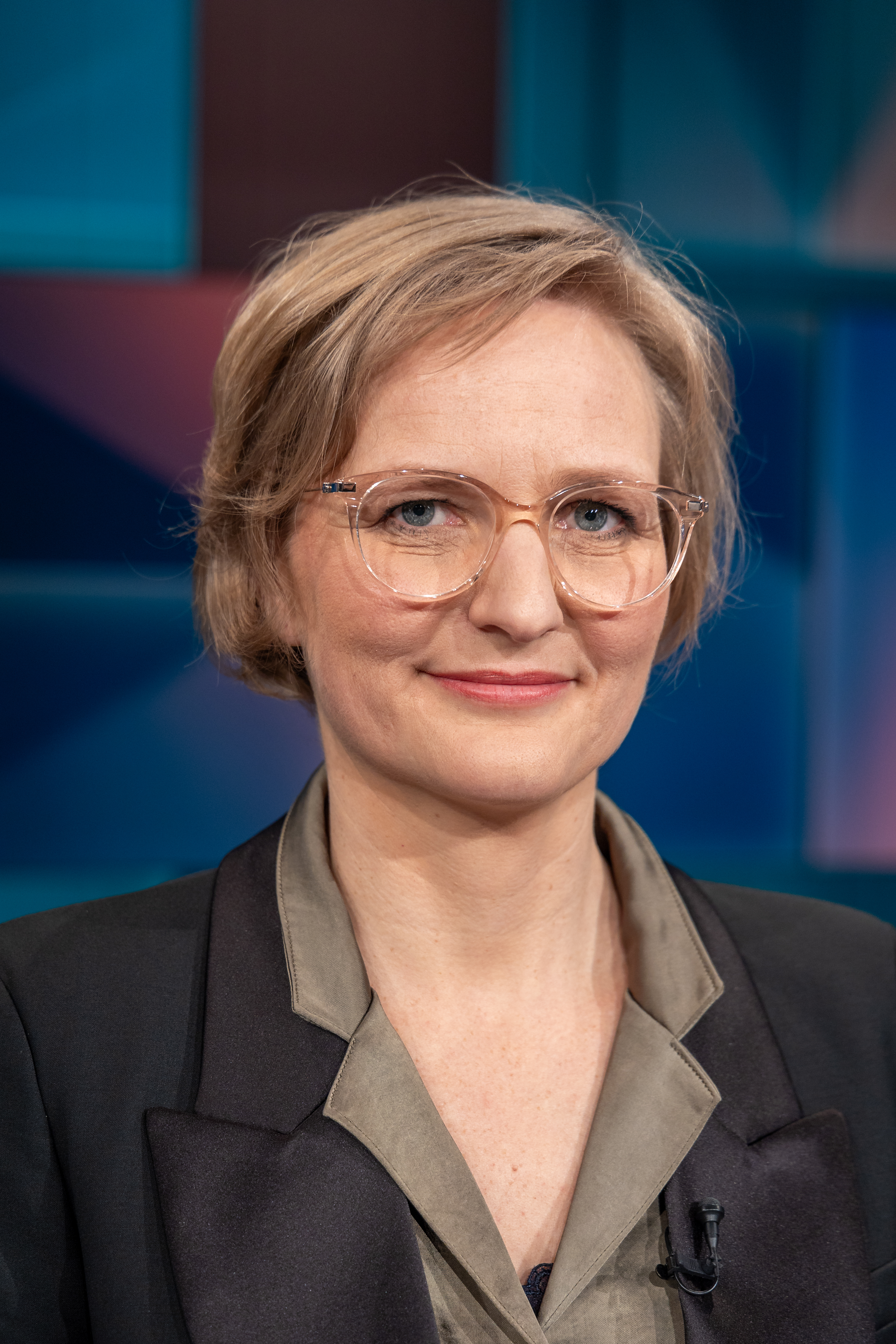
- Brantner in 2025

Leader of Alliance 90/The Greens
- Incumbent
- Assumed office 16 November 2024 Serving with Felix Banaszak
- Deputy: Sven Giegold; Heiko Knopf; Manuela Rottmann
- Preceded by: Ricarda Lang

Parliamentary State Secretary for Economic Affairs and Climate Action
- In office 8 December 2021 – 6 May 2025
- Chancellor: Olaf Scholz
- Minister: Robert Habeck
- Preceded by: Marco Wanderwitz

Member of the Bundestag; from Baden-Württemberg
- Incumbent
- Assumed office 22 October 2013
- Constituency: State list (2013–2021); Heidelberg (2021–2025); State list (2025–present)

Member of the European Parliament for Germany
- In office 14 July 2009 – 22 September 2013

Personal details
- Born: 24 August 1979 (age 47) Lörrach, Baden-Württemberg, West Germany
- Party: Alliance 90/The Greens (since 1996)
- Children: 1
- Education: Sciences Po; Columbia University; University of Mannheim

Franziska Katharina Brantner (born 24 August 1979) is a German politician of the Green Party who has been serving as a member of the German Parliament since 2013. Since 2024, she has also been serving as co-leader of Alliance 90/The Greens, alongside Felix Banaszak.

In addition to her parliamentary mandate, Brantner served as Parliamentary State Secretary at the Federal Ministry for Economic Affairs and Climate Action in the coalition government of Chancellor Olaf Scholz from 2021 to 2025. In this capacity, her portfolio included European affairs, trade policy, and digitization. Moreover, she was also the ministry's Special Coordinator for the Extractive Industries Transparency Initiative (EITI).

Brantner was a Member of the European Parliament (MEP) from 2009 to 2013.

== Early life and career ==
Brantner grew up in Neuenburg am Rhein in western Baden-Württemberg. After graduating from the bilingual Deutsch-Französisches Gymnasium in Freiburg im Breisgau and gathering her first international experiences working at the offices of the Heinrich Böll Foundation in Tel Aviv and Washington D.C. she studied political science with focus on International Affairs and European Policy at the Sciences Po in Paris and School of International and Public Affairs, Columbia University in New York City, where she graduated in 2004.

In 2010, Brantner defended her PhD thesis "The reformability of the United Nations" at the University of Mannheim where she used to be a research associate at the department for Political Science II at Thomas König lab. Brantner lectured in Mannheim International Policy. From 2006 to 2007, she worked as a research associate at the European Studies Centre of St Antony's College, Oxford.

During the conference "Peking+5" of the UN Plenum in 2000 (following the UN World Women Conference of Peking in 1995) and until 2005 Brantner was Vice President of the "Youth Caucus" belonging to the United Nations Commission on the Status of Women. She also worked as a consultant for the United Nations Development Fund for Women (UNIFEM), the Women’s Rights Organisation of the UN. In Brussels she coordinated a project in cooperation with the French presidency of the Council of the European Union in 2008, which developed the European master plan for the resolution 1325 of the UN Security Council.

In 2010, Brantner was (along with Richard Gowan) co-author of a study concerning the EU Human Rights Policy on behalf of the European Council on Foreign Relations. According to the study, 127 out of the 192 members of the United Nations General Assembly voted against EU stances on human rights, up from 117 previous year; only half of democratic countries outside the Union voted with it most of the time. For the Bertelsmann Foundation, she worked in Brussels on the subjects of European Foreign Affairs and European answers to the banking crisis.

Brantner was a couple with former Green Party politician Boris Palmer until 2013. The couple have a child born in May 2010.

== Political career ==
In 1996, Brantner became a member of the Green Party Youth at the age of 17. She then was part of the Green Party's local administration in Baden-Württemberg and their Federal Board. During her studies at Sciences Po in Paris she founded a Green university group and was co-organiser of the first "European Students Convent" in 2001/2002.

She is a member of the General Assembly of the Heinrich Böll Foundation, was member of the Peace and Security Commission of the Green national party and was one of the authors of the party's manifesto for the European election in 2009.

=== Member of the European Parliament, 2009–13 ===
In the 2009 European elections, Brantner obtained one of the 14 mandates of the German Green Party in the European Parliament. She was member of the Greens–European Free Alliance group, then under the leadership of Daniel Cohn-Bendit and Rebecca Harms.

During her time in parliament, Brantner served as Member and coordinator on the Committee on Foreign Affairs, and as substitute member on the Subcommittee on Security and Defence, the Committee on Women’s Rights and Gender Equality and on the Committee on Budgets.

Brantner also served as spokeswoman for foreign affairs of the Greens/EFA group in the European Parliament and Parliament’s standing rapporteur for the Instrument for Stability. She also was her group’s chief negotiator for the establishment of the European External Action Service (EEAD). In 2010, she joined the Friends of the EEAS, an unofficial and independent pressure group formed because of concerns that the High Representative of the Union for Foreign Affairs and Security Policy Catherine Ashton was not paying sufficient attention to the Parliament and was sharing too little information on the formation of the European External Action Service.

In 2010 she supported the Spinelli Group initiative for more Europe.

During the euro crisis, Brantner pleaded for solidarity and community liability.

=== Member of the Bundestag, 2013–present ===
In 2013, Brantner was elected to the Bundestag (the German Parliament) for Alliance '90/The Greens, succeeding Fritz Kuhn as representative of the 274th district Heidelberg. Following the 2013 federal election, she became a member of the Bundestag.

Between 2014 and 2017, Brantner served as chairwoman of the parliamentary Sub-Committee for Civilian Crisis Prevention and as member of the Committee on Family Affairs, Senior Citizens, Women and Youth. From 2017 until 2021, she has been serving as secretary of her parliamentary group, in this position assisting the group's chairs Katrin Göring-Eckardt and Anton Hofreiter. She also served on the Committee on European Affairs. From 2019 until 2021, she was a member of the German delegation to the Franco-German Parliamentary Assembly.

In addition to her committee assignments, Brantner is a Deputy Chairwoman of the German-Egyptian Parliamentary Friendship Group. She is also part of the Elie Wiesel Network of Parliamentarians for the Prevention of Genocide and Mass Atrocities and against Genocide Denial.

In the negotiations to form a coalition government under the leadership of Minister-President of Baden-Württemberg Winfried Kretschmann following the 2021 state elections, Brantner was part of the working group on European and international affairs, led by Theresa Schopper and Daniel Caspary.

In the negotiations to form a so-called traffic light coalition of the Social Democrats (SPD), the Green Party and the FDP following the 2021 federal elections, Brantner led her party's delegation in the working group on European affairs; her co-chairs from the other parties were Udo Bullmann and Nicola Beer.

== Other activities ==
=== Government agencies ===
- Germany Trade and Invest (GTAI), Ex-Officio Chair of the Supervisory Board (since 2022)
- German Foundation for International Legal Cooperation (IRZ), Member of the Board of Trustees (since 2022)
- Federal Agency for Disruptive Innovation (SPRIN-D), Ex-Officio Member of the Supervisory Board (since 2022)

=== Non-profit organizations ===
- European Policy Centre (EPC), Member of the Governing Board (since 2021)
- Jacques Delors Centre at Hertie School, Member of the Advisory Board (since 2019)
- European Council on Foreign Relations (ECFR), Member of the Council (since 2019)
- Paris School of International Affairs (PSIA), Member of the Strategic Committee
- EastWest Institute, Member of the Parliamentarians Network for Conflict Prevention
- Heinrich Böll Foundation, Member of the General Assembly
- New Pact for Europe, Member of the Advisory Group

== Political positions ==
Since becoming a member of the Bundestag, Brantner has regularly abstained from parliamentary votes on the participation of Germany in United Nations peacekeeping missions as well as in United Nations-mandated European Union peacekeeping missions, including those for Afghanistan (2014), Somalia (2014, 2015 and 2018), Darfur/Sudan (2013, 2014), South Sudan (2013 and 2014) and the Central African Republic (2014). She voted against participation in EUTM Somalia (2014 and 2016). However, she voted in favor of extending the German mandate for the UN missions in Mali (2014, 2016 and 2018), Lebanon (2014) and Liberia (2015).

Amid the European migrant crisis in 2015, Brantner and fellow Green parliamentarians Luise Amtsberg, Annalena Baerbock, Manuel Sarrazin and Wolfgang Strengmann-Kuhn called for more responsibilities for the European Commission in managing the European Union's intake of refugees, a clearer definition of the mandate of Frontex and EU-managed facilities for asylum seekers in their countries of origin.
