= Lars Castellucci =

German politician (born 1974)

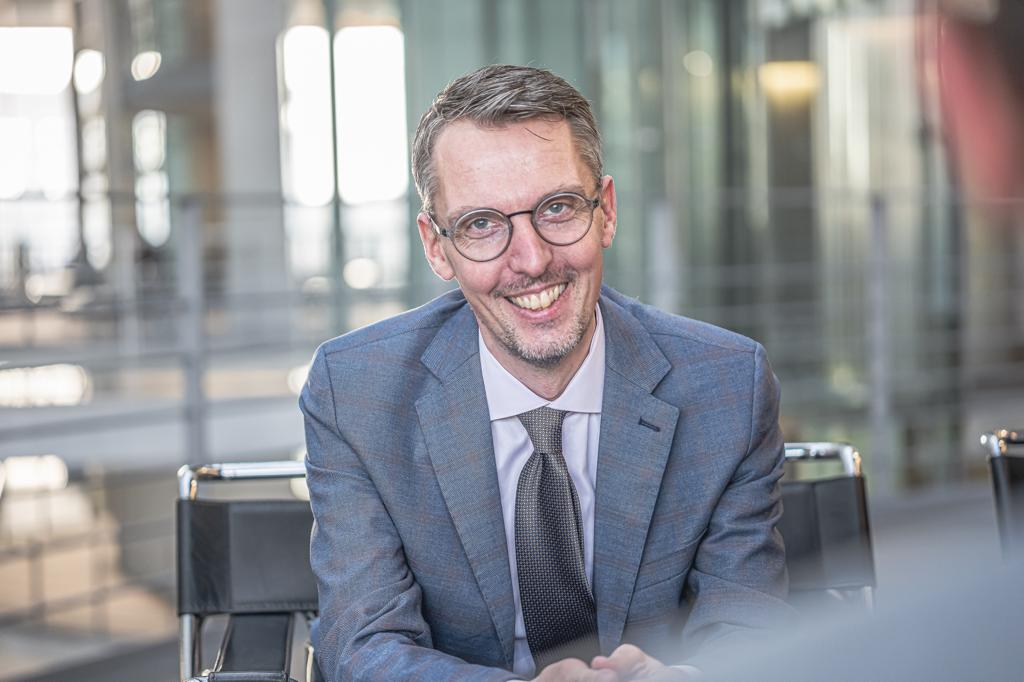

Federal Commissioner for Human Rights Policy and Humanitarian Assistance
- Incumbent
- Assumed office 2025
- Chancellor: Friedrich Merz
- Minister: Johann Wadephul
- Preceded by: Luise Amtsberg

Member of the Bundestag
- Incumbent
- Assumed office 2013

Personal details
- Born: 24 February 1974 (age 52) Heidelberg, West Germany (now Germany)
- Party: German: Social Democratic Party; EU: Party of European Socialists

Lars Castellucci (born 24 February 1974) is a German politician of the Social Democratic Party of Germany (SPD) who has been serving as a member of the German Bundestag since 2013.

In addition to his parliamentary work, Castellucci has been serving as the Federal Government Commissioner for Human Rights Policy and Humanitarian Assistance in the government of Chancellor Friedrich Merz since 2025.

== Early life and career ==
Castellucci studied political sciences, medieval and modern history and public law at the Universities of Heidelberg, Mannheim and at the San Francisco State University (SFSU) of California from 1995 to 2000, graduating with Magister Artium. He obtained doctorate (Dr. phil.) at the Technische Universität Darmstadt in 2008. His dissertation explored possible courses of action for the labor market policy facing social outlawing in Germany.

Castellucci worked as project leader for community and regional development and public participation at IFOK GmbH from 2001 to 2013. He is Professor of sustainable management, with a focus on integration and diversity management, at the University of Applied Management Studies (HdWM) in Mannheim since April 2013.

== Political career ==
Castellucci joined the Social Democratic Party of Germany (SPD) in 1991. From 1995 to 2001 he was chairman of the Wiesloch local branch of the SPD and was elected member of the municipal council in Wiesloch in 1999. In 2001 he became chairman of the SPD group on Wiesloch municipal council.

Castellucci also filled the position of chairman of the Rhein-Neckar county branch of the SPD from 2001 to 2009. He was elected deputy chairman of the Baden-Württemberg branch of the SPD in 2005.

=== Member of the Bundestag, 2013-present ===
On 22 September 2013, Castellucci was first elected Member of the German Bundestag. From 2013 to 2021, he was a member of Committee on Internal Affairs and member of Committee on the Affairs of the European Union, where he served as his parliamentary group’s rapporteur on asylum and migration. He was also deputy chairman of the Parliamentary Advisory Council on Sustainable Development and chairman of the German-Italian Parliamentary Friendship Group. Since 2021, he has been serving on the Committee on Economic Cooperation and Development. From 2022 to 2025, he served as deputy chairman of the Committee of Internal Affairs and Community.

Since 2014, Castelucci has also been serving on the Advisory Committee on Sinti and Roma at the Federal Ministry of the Interior.

In 2018, Castellucci campaigned to succeed Leni Breymaier as chair of the SPD in Baden-Württemberg; he eventually lost against his competitor Andreas Stoch.

== Other activities ==
- World Vision Germany, Member of the Board of Trustees (since 2020)
- Evangelical Church in Germany (EKD), Member of the Committee on Migration and Integration (since 2016)
- Foundation "Remembrance, Responsibility and Future", Alternate Member of the Board of Trustees (since 2014)
- Bündnis für Demokratie und Toleranz, Member of the Advisory Board
- Education and Science Workers' Union (GEW), Member
- Friends of Nature, Member

== Personal life ==
Castellucci lives with his partner in Heidelberg.
