= Sven Giegold =

German politician (born 1969)

Sven Giegold MEP
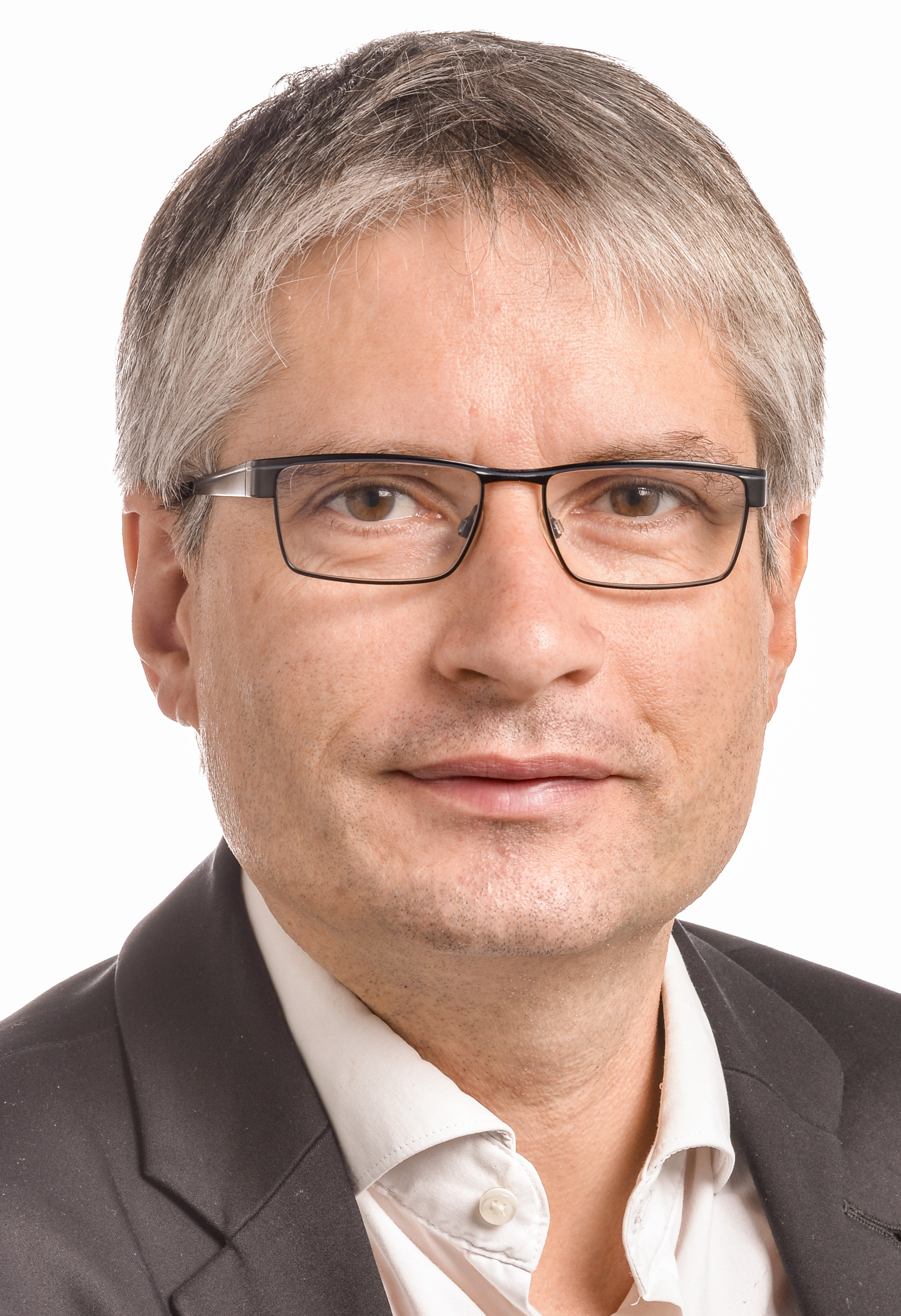

Member of the European Parliament
- In office 1 July 2009 – 15 December 2021
- Succeeded by: Malte Gallée
- Constituency: Germany

Personal details
- Born: 17 November 1969 (age 56) Las Palmas de Gran Canaria, Spain
- Party: Germany: Alliance 90/The Greens; EU: The Greens–European Free Alliance
- Education: University of Birmingham (MA)
- Website: sven-giegold.de

Sven Giegold (born 17 November 1969) is a German politician of the Alliance 90/The Greens who has been serving as the party's deputy chair since 2024, under co-chairs Franziska Brantner and Felix Banaszak.

From 2021 to 2024, Giegold served as State Secretary in the Federal Ministry for Economic Affairs and Climate Action in the coalition government of Chancellor Olaf Scholz. He was a member of the European Parliament from 2009 to 2021.

Giegold is a founding member of Attac Germany. He became a member of the Greens only in 2008, and was elected to the European Parliament in the 2009 elections.

== Early life and education ==
Born in Las Palmas de Gran Canaria, Spain, Giegold grew up in Hanover, Lower Saxony. He enrolled at the University of Lüneburg in 1991 majoring in political science and economics, and later attended the University of Bremen. He earned his Master's degree from the University of Birmingham in 1996. He returned to the University of Bremen to pursue his Ph.D. under supervision of Jörg Huffschmid, but later abandoned his studies in favor of his political career.

== Political career ==
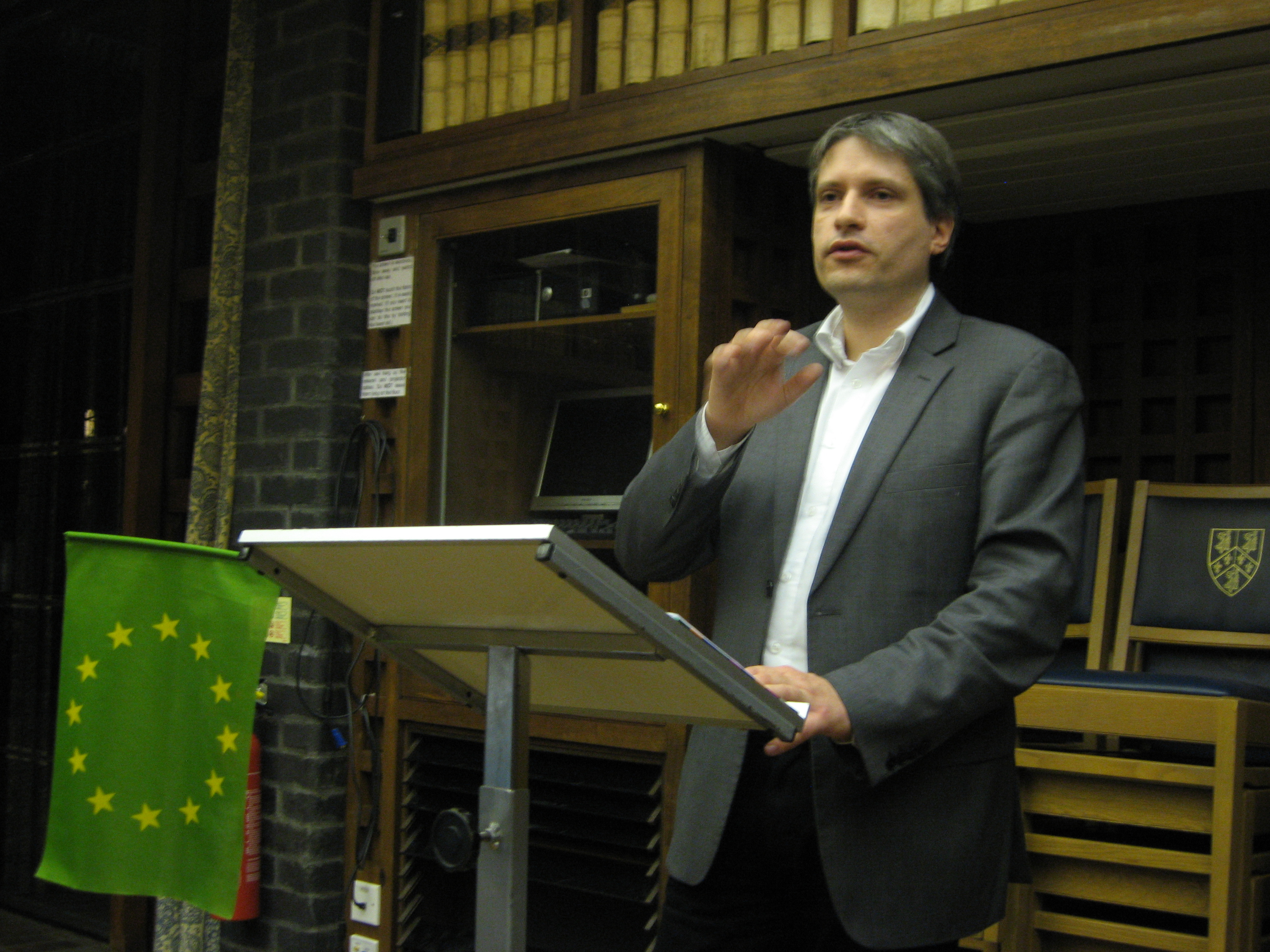
Sven Giegold MEP speaking about ‘how to tame the bankers’ at an event held by the Oxford University European Affairs Society in Trinity College, Oxford.

=== Career in national politics ===
Giegold was one of the 200 founding members of Attac's German branch in 2000 and was one of their most notable activists until 2008.

Giegold was a Green Party delegate to the Federal Convention for the purpose of electing the President of Germany in 2010.

=== Member of the European Parliament, 2009–2021 ===
Giegold was elected to the European Parliament in the 2009 elections. Throughout his tenure, he served on the Committee on Economic and Monetary Affairs. In this capacity, he was responsible for draft legislation to set up the European Securities and Markets Authority (ESMA) in 2010. In 2013, in their capacity as the parliament’s lead negotiators, Giegold and fellow MEP Marianne Thyssen reached an inter-institutional compromise agreement with the member states on the SSM Regulation. From 2014, he was the Greens–European Free Alliance group co-ordinator for the committee.

Between 2009 and 2011, Giegold was a member of the Special Committee on the Financial, Economic and Social Crisis. From 2015 until 2016, he was a member of the Special Committee on Tax Rulings and Other Measures Similar in Nature or Effect. From 2016 until 2017, he was part of the Parliament's Committee of Inquiry into Money Laundering, Tax Avoidance and Tax Evasion (PANA) that investigated the Panama Papers revelations and tax avoidance schemes more broadly. In 2020, he joined the Subcommittee on Tax Matters.

In addition, Giegold was a member of the European Parliament Intergroups on the Welfare and Conservation of Animals and the Social Economy, and of the Spinelli Group.

Following the 2019 elections, Giegold was part of a cross-party working group in charge of drafting the European Parliament's five-year work program on economic and fiscal policies as well as trade.

=== State Secretary at the Ministry for Economic Affairs and Climate Action, 2021–2024 ===
In the negotiations to form a coalition government of the Christian Democratic Union (CDU) and the Green Party under Minister-President of North Rhine-Westphalia Hendrik Wüst following the 2022 state elections, Giegold and Felix Banaszak led their party’s delegation in the working group on finances; their counterparts from the CDU were Lutz Lienenkämper and Günter Krings.

== Political positions ==
Following the 2014 elections, Giegold joined fellow MEPs Othmar Karas, Sylvie Goulard, Sophie in 't Veld and Alessia Mosca in an open letter aimed at exerting pressure on the President of the European Commission and national government leaders during the nominations process to improve the gender balance in the composition of the European Commission.

Since 2016, Giegold has been sponsoring a proposal that would redefine how the assembly defines lobbying and set new rules for how MEPs could meet with people trying to influence legislation.

Giegold was the winner of the Economic and Monetary Award Affairs, MEP Awards 2017.

== Other activities ==
- Leibniz Association, Ex-Officio Member of the Senate (since 2022)
- Development and Peace Foundation (SEF), Member of the Board of Trustees
- Evangelical Church in Germany (EKD), Member of the Committee on Sustainable Development
- Forum Ökologisch-Soziale Marktwirtschaft (FÖS), Member of the Advisory Board
- Association for the Taxation of Financial Transactions and for Citizens' Action (ATTAC), Member
- FIAN Germany, Member
- Institut Solidarische Moderne (ISM), Member of the Board
- Leibniz Institute for Financial Research (SAFE), Member of the Policy Council
- Tax Justice Network, Member
- ver.di, Member
