= Kerstin Radomski =

German politician

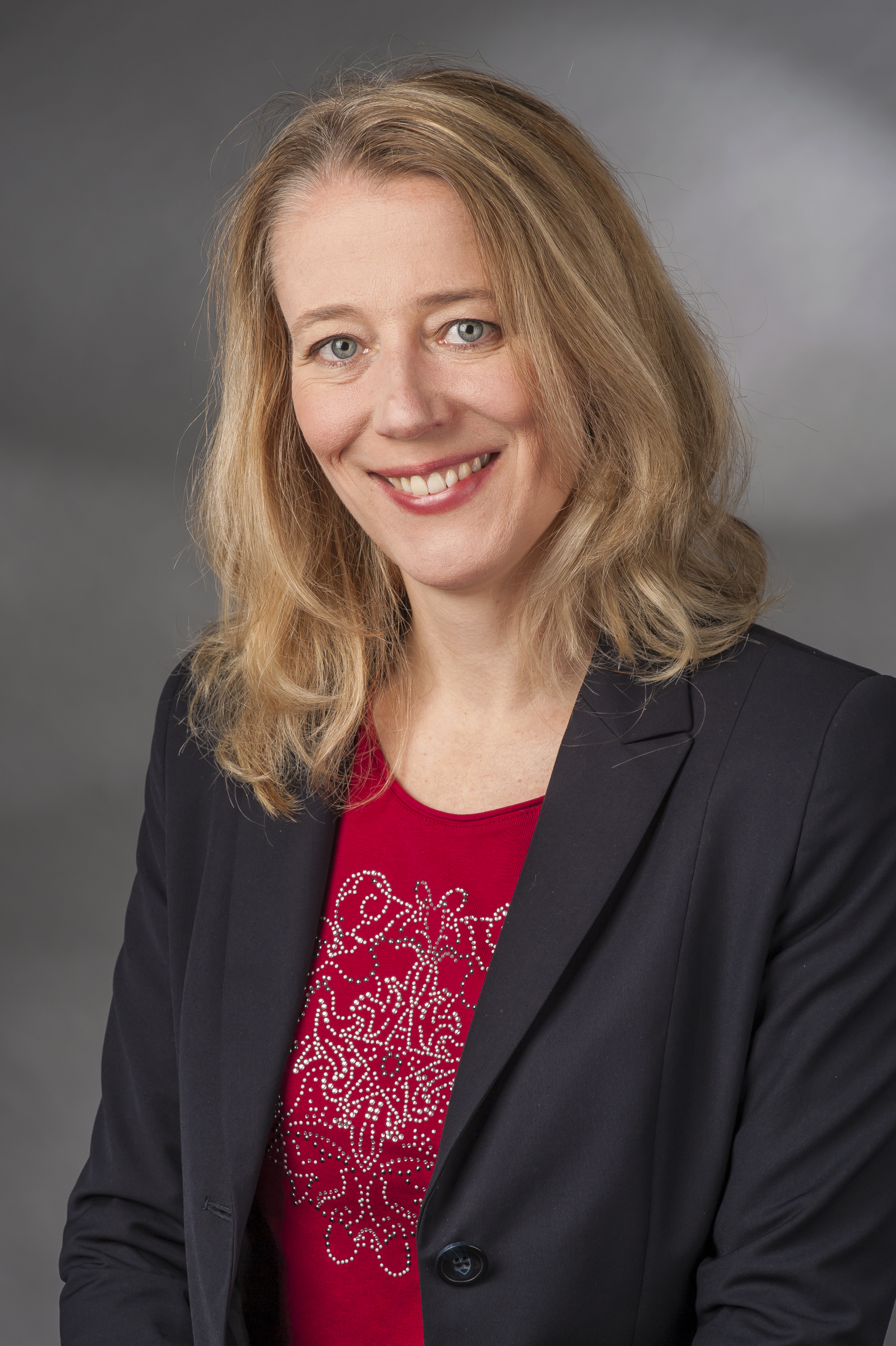
- Kerstin Radomski in 2014

Member of the Bundestag for Krefeld II – Wesel II
- Incumbent
- Assumed office 2013

Personal details
- Born: 1 November 1974 (age 51) Hüls, West Germany (now Germany)
- Party: CDU
- Education: Ruhr University Bochum

Kerstin Christiane Radomski (born 1 November 1974) is a German teacher and politician of the Christian Democratic Union (CDU) who has been serving as a member of the Bundestag from the state of North Rhine-Westphalia since 2013.

== Political career ==
Since 2005, Radomski has been part of the CDU's leadership in North Rhine-Westphalia, under successive chairmen Jürgen Rüttgers (2005–2010), Norbert Röttgen (2010–2012), Armin Laschet (2012–2021) and Hendrik Wüst (since 2021).

Radomski became a member of the Bundestag in the 2013 German federal election, representing the Krefeld II – Wesel II district. She is a member of the Budget Committee and the Audit Committee. In this capacity, she serves as her parliamentary group's rapporteur on the annual budget of the Federal Ministry of Education and Research. Since 2022, she has also been part of the so-called Confidential Committee (Vertrauensgremium) of the Budget Committee, which provides budgetary supervision for Germany's three intelligence services, BND, BfV and MAD.

From 2013 to 2017 and again since 2022, Radomski has also been a member of the Parliamentary Advisory Board on Sustainable Development. In addition to her committee assignments, she was part of the German delegation to the Parliamentary Assembly of the Council of Europe (PACE) from 2005 to 2018.

== Other activities ==
- Institute for Federal Real Estate (BImA), Member of the supervisory board (since 2025)
- Schutzgemeinschaft Deutscher Wald (SDW), Member

== Political positions ==
In June 2017, Radomski voted against Germany's introduction of same-sex marriage.
