= Ulle Schauws =

German politician (born 1966)

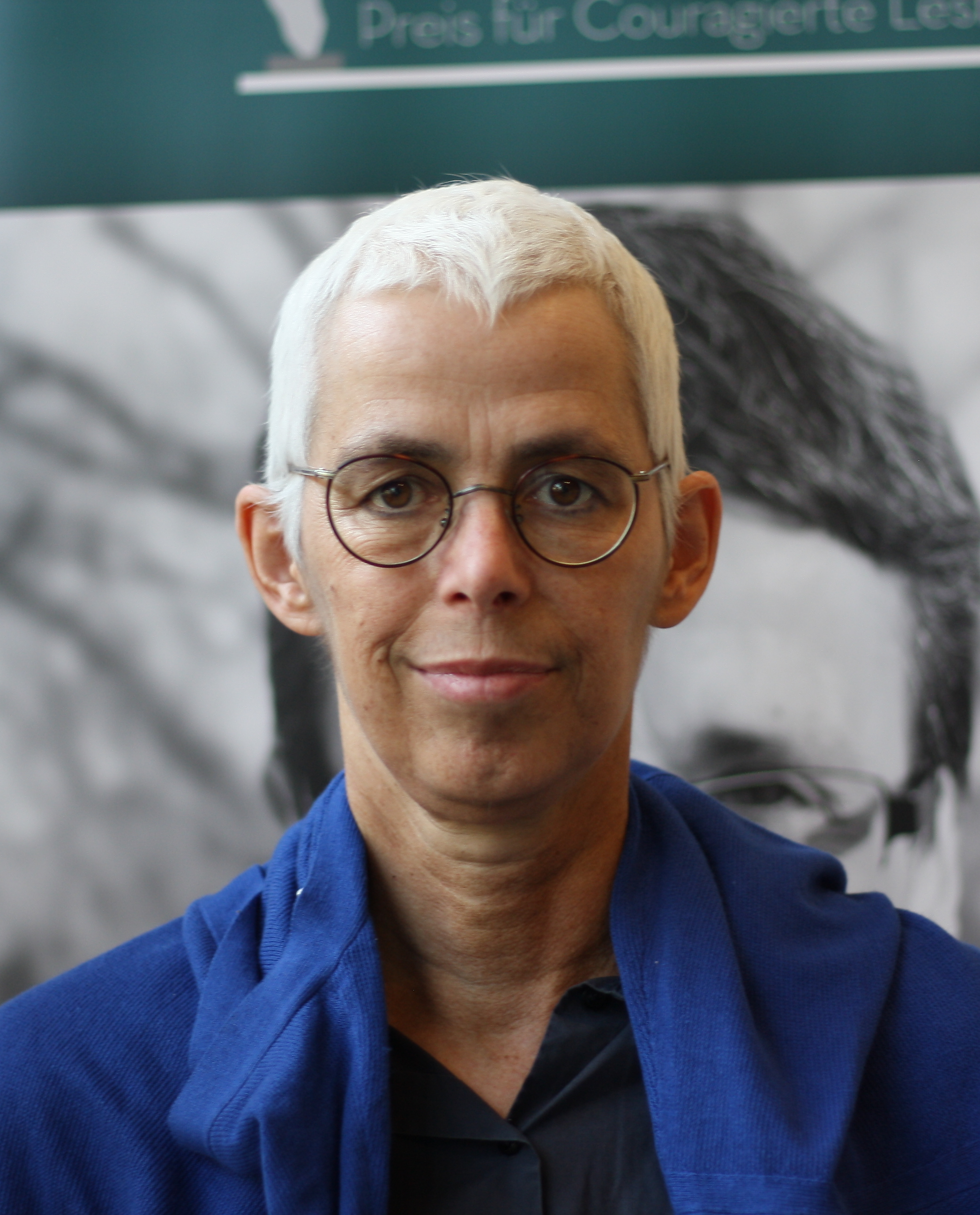
- Schauws in 2024

Member of the Bundestag
- Incumbent
- Assumed office 2013

Personal details
- Born: Ursula Schauws; 30 April 1966 (age 60) Hüls, North Rhine-Westphalia, West Germany
- Citizenship: German
- Party: Alliance '90/The Greens
- Education: Free University of Berlin; Ruhr University Bochum; University of Glasgow

Ursula "Ulle" Schauws (born 30 April 1966) is a German politician of the Alliance '90/The Greens party.

== Education and early career ==
Schauws studied history, politics and film studies. She worked as contributing editor and dramaturge for German film productions – including Alarm für Cobra 11 – Die Autobahnpolizei – before becoming a social worker with SOS Children's Villages.

== Political career ==
Schauws in the Bundesrat speaking about the Istanbul Convention in 2019

Schauws has been a member of the German Bundestag since the 2013 federal elections, representing the Krefeld II – Wesel II district. She successfully ran for re-election again in 2017, this time on the 11th place of the Green Party's list.

Since joining the parliament, Schauws has been serving on the Committee on Family Affairs, Senior Citizens, Women and Youth, which appointed her as deputy chairperson in 2018. From 2014 until 2017, she was also a member of the Committee on Cultural and Media Affairs. Within her parliamentary group, she serves as spokesperson on women's issues. Since 2022, she has been part of the Commission for the Reform of the Electoral Law and the Modernization of Parliamentary Work, co-chaired by Johannes Fechner and Nina Warken.

In addition to her committee assignments, Schauws has been serving as deputy chairwoman of the Southern African Parliamentary Friendship Group (since 2018).

In the negotiations to form a coalition government between the SPD, the Green Party and Free Democratic Party (FDP) following the 2021 federal elections, Schauws was part of her party's delegation in the working group on equality, co-chaired by Petra Köpping, Ricarda Lang and Herbert Mertin.

== Other activities ==
- Foundation "Remembrance, Responsibility and Future“ (EVZ), Member of the Board of Trustees (since 2021)
- German Foundation for World Population (DSW), Member of the Parliamentary Advisory Board
- Nature and Biodiversity Conservation Union (NABU), Member
- Magnus Hirschfeld Foundation, Deputy Member of the Board of Trustees (–2022)

== Personal life ==
Schauws lives with her partner in Krefeld.
