= Günter Krings =

German lawyer and politician (born 1969)

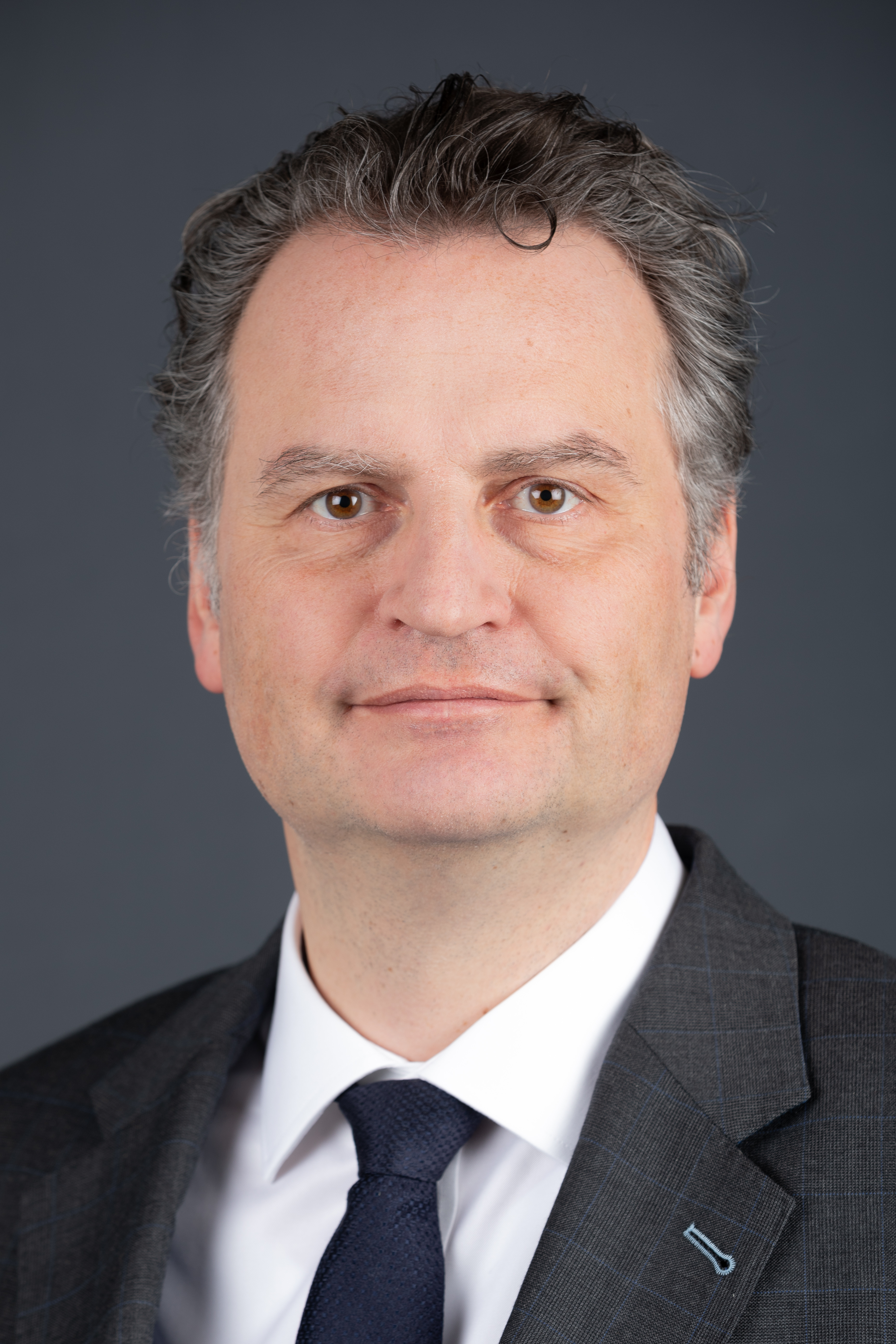
- Krings in 2020

Parliamentary State Secretary in the Federal Ministry of the Interior
- In office December 2013 – December 2021
- Minister: Hans-Peter Friedrich, Thomas de Maizière and Horst Seehofer
- Preceded by: Christoph Bergner
- Succeeded by: Rita Schwarzelühr-Sutter, Mahmut Özdemir and Johann Saathoff

Member of the Bundestag
- Incumbent
- Assumed office 2002

Personal details
- Born: 7 August 1969 (age 57) Rheydt, West Germany (now Germany)
- Party: CDU
- Education: University of Cologne (BA) (PhD); Temple University (BA)

Günter Krings (born 7 August 1969) is a German lawyer and politician of the Christian Democratic Union (CDU) who has been serving as a member of the Bundestag from the state of North Rhine-Westphalia since 2002.

In addition to his parliamentary work, Krings also served as Parliamentary State Secretary at the Federal Ministry of the Interior in the government of Chancellor Angela Merkel from 2013 until 2021.

== Political career ==
Krings first became a member of the Bundestag in the 2002 German federal election. In his first term from 2002 until 2005, he served on the Committee on Legal Affairs. From 2006 until 2009, he chaired the Parliamentary Advisory Board on Sustainable Development.

From 2009 until 2013, Krings served as deputy chairman of the CDU/CSU parliamentary group, under the leadership of chairman Volker Kauder. In this capacity, he coordinated the group's legislative activities on consumer protection, domestic affairs, sports, and minorities. He was also a member of the Committee on the Election of Judges (Wahlausschuss), which is in charge of appointing judges to the Federal Constitutional Court of Germany. In 2012, he helped steer through parliament legislation on a so-called ancillary copyright for press publishers.

In the negotiations to form a Grand Coalition of Merkel’s Christian Democrats (CDU together with the Bavarian CSU) and the Social Democrats (SPD) following the 2013 federal elections, Krings was part of the CDU/CSU delegation in the working group on internal and legal affairs, led by Hans-Peter Friedrich and Thomas Oppermann.

Krings served as Parliamentary State Secretary at the Federal Ministry of the Interior, under successive ministers Thomas de Maizière (2013–2018) and Horst Seehofer (2018–2021).

Since 2017, Krings has been leading the Bundestag group of CDU parliamentarians from North Rhine-Westphalia, the largest delegation within the CDU/CSU parliamentary group. In the negotiations to form a fourth coalition government under the leadership of Chancellor Angela Merkel following the 2017 federal elections, he was part of the working group on internal and legal affairs, led by Thomas de Maizière, Stephan Mayer and Heiko Maas.

Since the 2021 elections, Krings has been serving on the Committee on Legal Affairs again. Since 2022, he has also been serving on the parliamentary body in charge of appointing judges to the Highest Courts of Justice, namely the Federal Court of Justice (BGH), the Federal Administrative Court (BVerwG), the Federal Fiscal Court (BFH), the Federal Labour Court (BAG), and the Federal Social Court (BSG).

In the negotiations to form a coalition government of the CDU and Green Party under Minister-President of North Rhine-Westphalia Hendrik Wüst following the 2022 state elections, Krings and Lutz Lienenkämper led their party’s delegation in the working group on finances; their counterparts from the Green Party were Felix Banaszak and Sven Giegold.

In 2025, Krings was nominated by CDU chair Friedrich Merz as candidate to succeed Norbert Lammert at the helm of the Konrad Adenauer Foundation; in a vote on the appointment, however, he lost out against Annegret Kramp-Karrenbauer.

== Other activities ==
- Stiftung Forum Recht, Member of the Board of Trustees (since 2022)
- Association of German Foundations, Member of the Parliamentary Advisory Board
- German Foundation for World Population (DSW), Member of the Parliamentary Advisory Board (–2021)
- International Association of Legislation (IAL), Member of the Advisory Council

== Political positions ==
In June 2017, Krings voted against Germany's introduction of same-sex marriage.

Ahead of the Christian Democrats’ leadership election in 2018, Krings publicly endorsed Jens Spahn to succeed Angela Merkel as the party’s chair. For the 2021 national elections, he later endorsed Armin Laschet as the Christian Democrats' joint candidate to succeed Merkel as chancellor.

In December 2023 Krings accused Secretary-General of the United Nations António Guterres of being one-sided in the Gaza war and cautioned in regard to UN reports about the scope of the humanitarian crisis in Gaza.
