= Carolin Wagner =

German politician

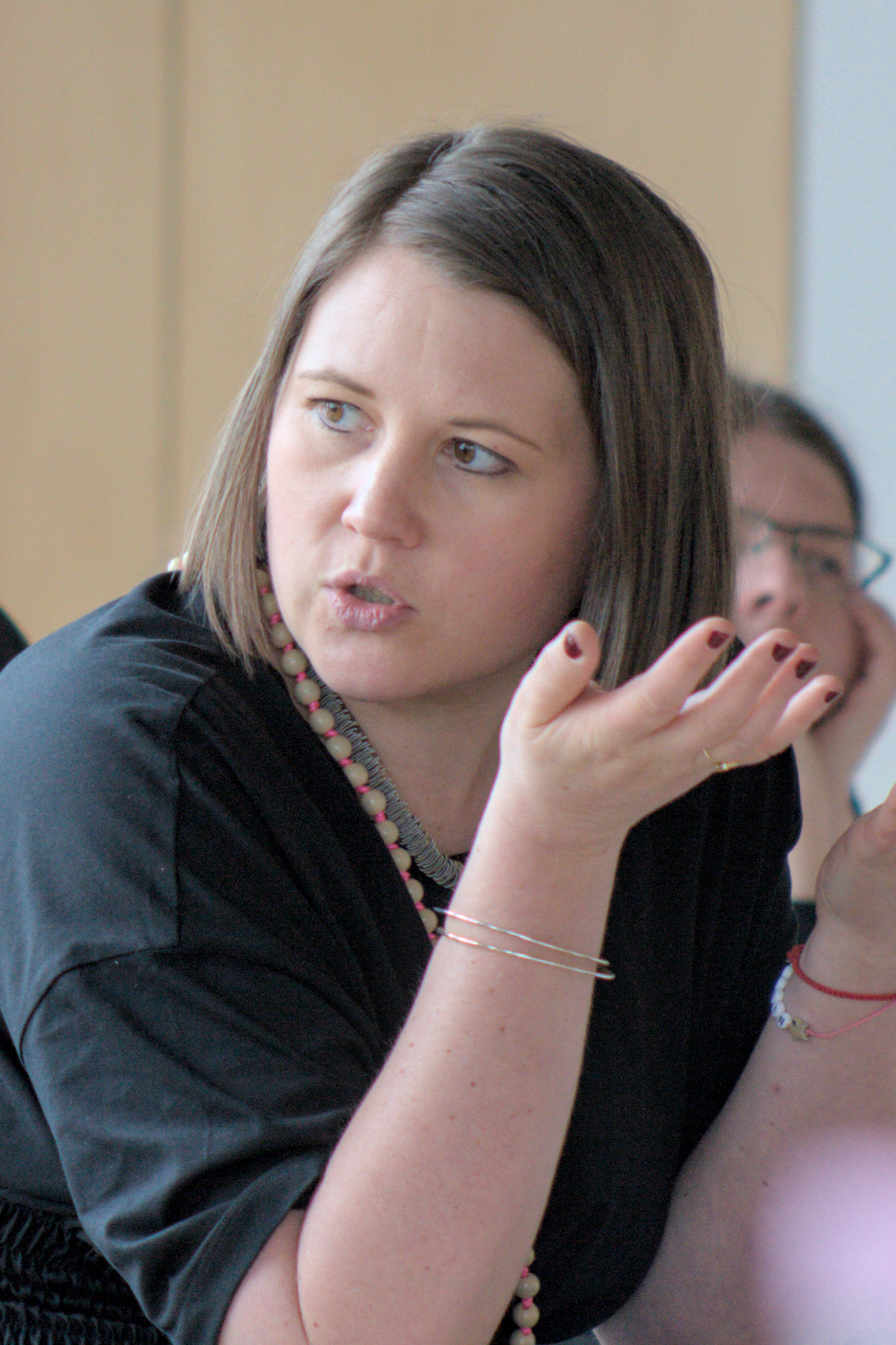
Carolin Wagner

Carolin Wagner (born 1 October 1982) is a German politician of the Social Democratic Party (SPD) who has been serving as a member of the Bundestag since 2021, representing the Regensburg district.

== Early life and education ==
Wagner was born 1982 in the West Germany city of Heidelberg and studied German studies.

== Political career ==
Wagner has been a member of the Bundestag since the 2021 elections. In parliament, she has since been serving on the Committee on Education, Research and Technology Assessment and the Committee on Digital Affairs.

Within the SPD parliamentary group, Wagner and Carsten Träger have been leading the Bundestag group of SPD parliamentarians from Bavaria since 2023. She is part of a working group on integration and migration, chaired by Lars Castellucci. She also belongs to Parliamentary Left, a left-wing movement.

In the negotiations to form a Grand Coalition under the leadership of Friedrich Merz's Christian Democrats (CDU together with the Bavarian CSU) and the SPD following the 2025 German elections, Wagner was part of the SPD delegation in the working group on digital policy, led by Manuel Hagel, Reinhard Brandt and Armand Zorn.

== Other activities ==
- Federal Network Agency for Electricity, Gas, Telecommunications, Post and Railway (BNetzA), Alternate Member of the Advisory Board (since 2022)
- Education and Science Workers' Union (GEW), Member
