= Philipp Türmer =

German politician (born 1996)

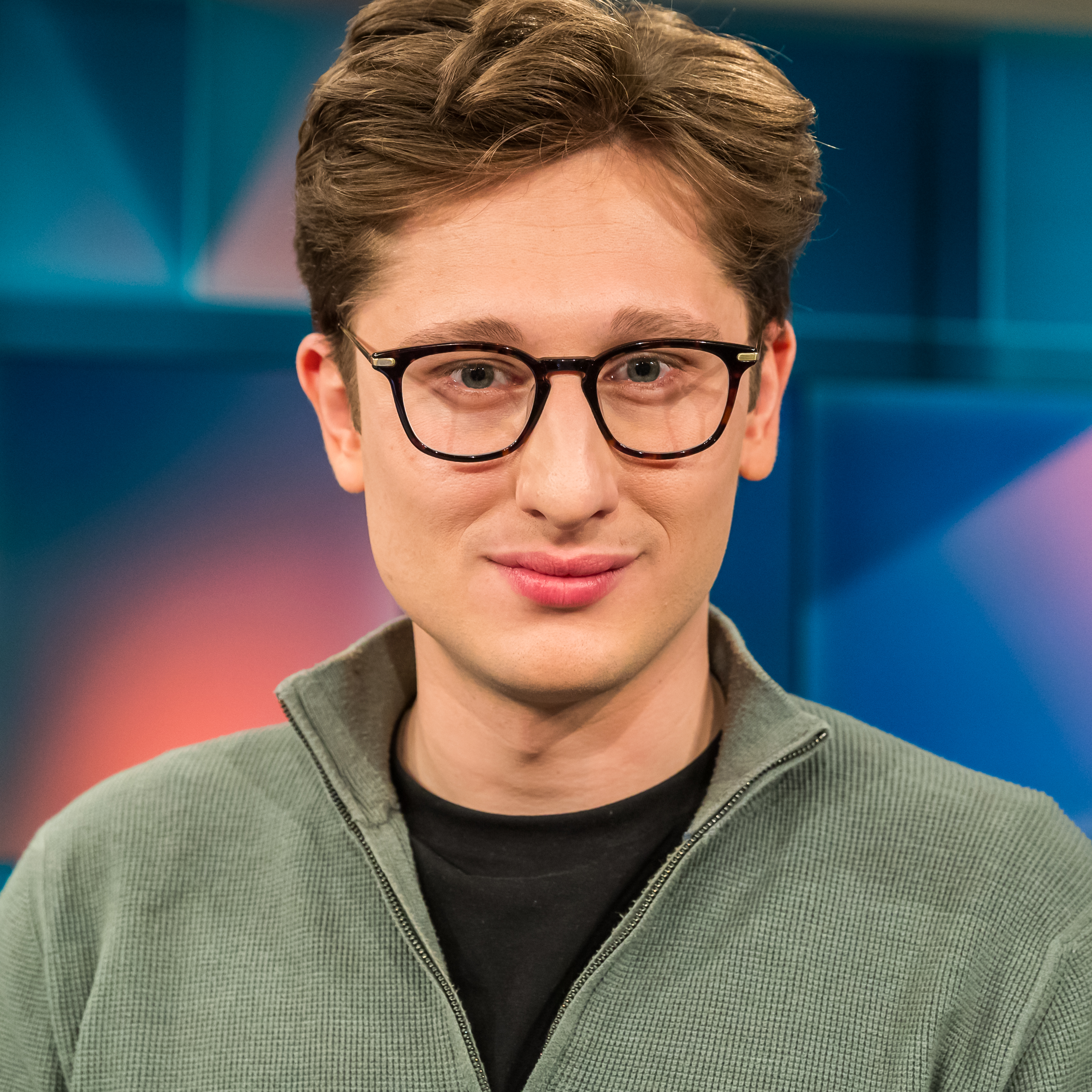
- Türmer in 2025

Chairman of Jusos
- Incumbent
- Assumed office 17 November 2023
- Preceded by: Jessica Rosenthal

Personal details
- Born: 1996 (age 29–30) Offenbach am Main
- Party: Social Democratic Party (since 2012)

Philipp Gangolf Balthasar Türmer (born 1996 in Offenbach am Main) is a German politician serving as chairman of Jusos since 2023. From 2014 to 2018, he served as co-chairman of Jusos in Offenbach am Main.
