= Heike Heubach =

German politician (born 1979)

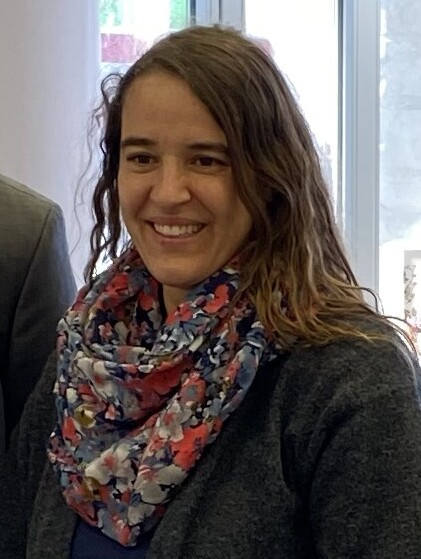
- Heike Heubach in 2024

Member of the Bundestag
- Incumbent
- Assumed office 20 March 2024
- Preceded by: Uli Grötsch

Personal details
- Born: 14 December 1979 (age 46) Rottweil, Germany
- Party: Social Democratic Party of Germany

Heike Heubach (German pronunciation: [ˈhaɪkə ˈhɔʏbax]; born 14 December 1979) is a German politician from the Social Democratic Party of Germany (SPD). She is the first deaf member of the German Bundestag.

== Early life and education ==
Heubach was born in Rottweil in 1979. She suffered a middle ear infection as an infant, which is believed to have caused her deafness.

After primary school and Hauptschule, she completed her Mittlere Reife at a commercial school in 1999, studied for one year in a Gymnasium, and finally obtained a specialised Fachabitur leaving certificate at a Fachoberschule in 2003. From 2008 to 2011 she trained as an industrial clerk at E.ON Facility Management.

== Career ==
Heubach worked as an industrial manager, at E.ON until 2013, then at Bayernwerk.

== Political career ==
Heubach joined the SPD in November 2019, and ran for the Stadtberg city council in the 2020 local elections. In February 2021, she was nominated as a direct candidate for SPD Bavaria in the Augsburg-Land constituency for the 2021 federal election. with approximately 14% of first votes, she was not elected on the party list.

On 20 March 2024, she replaced Uli Grötsch in the Bundestag when he resigned, becoming its first deaf member. She was welcomed to the plenary hall of the parliament building on 21 March. Carolin Wagner, the chairwoman of the Bavarian regional group in the SPD parliamentary group, called the event "a milestone for the inclusion and representation of the deaf community".

Unlike most members of the Bundestag, Heubach will have an assigned seat in the chamber. As an accessibility measure, sign language interpreters will be positioned near her, and when she speaks, an interpreter with a microphone will be positioned next to the parliamentary stenographers. She has said that while inclusion will be a focus of hers in the Bundestag, specifically the shortage of sign-language interpreters, her primary issue will be the climate crisis.

Heubach was awarded the Speech of the Year 2024 prize by the Seminar for General Rhetoric at the University of Tübingen for this “compelling plea for climate protection” and “moving example of a changed political rhetoric culture in the spirit of inclusion.

For the 2025 German federal election, Heubach ran again as a direct candidate in her constituency and was also 14th on the party state list. She received 12.7% of the first votes and was re-elected via the state party list. In the 21st German Bundestag, she is a full member of the Committee on Labour and Social Affairs and the Committee on Housing, Urban Development, Construction and Local Government. She is also a substitute member of the Committee on the Environment, Climate Protection, Nature Conservation and Nuclear Safety.

== Personal life ==
Heubach lives in Stadtbergen in the Augsburg district. She is married and has two children. Her sign name is the sign for "smile".
