= Jan Dieren =

German politician (born 1991)

Member of the Bundestag
- Incumbent
- Assumed office 2021

Personal details
- Born: 29 July 1991 (age 34) Moers
- Party: Social Democratic Party

Jan Dieren (born 29 July 1991) is a German lawyer and politician of the Social Democratic Party (SPD) who has been serving as a member of the Bundestag since 2021.

== Early life and education ==
Dieren was born in 1991 in the West German town of Moers. He studied law at Heinrich Heine University Düsseldorf and Ruhr University Bochum.

== Political career ==
Dieren was elected directly to the Bundestag in the 2021 elections, representing the Krefeld II – Wesel II district. In parliament, he has since been serving on the Committee on Labor and Social Affairs and the Committee on the Scrutiny of Elections, Immunity and the Rules of Procedure. He is his parliamentary group's rapporteur on co-determination in corporate governance.

Within the SPD parliamentary group, Dieren belongs to the Parliamentary Left, a left-wing movement.

== Other activities ==
- German United Services Trade Union (ver.di), Member
