= Hauke Finger =

German politician (born 1968)

Member of the Bundestag
- Incumbent
- Assumed office 25 March 2025
- Constituency: North Rhine-Westphalia

Personal details
- Born: 17 August 1968 (age 57)
- Party: Alternative for Germany (since 2013)

Hauke Horst Ernst Hans Finger (born 17 August 1968) is a German politician who was elected as a member of the Bundestag in 2025. He has been a member of the Alternative for Germany since 2013.
