= Dorothea Kliche-Behnke =

German politician (born 1981)

Member of the Landtag of Baden-Württemberg
- Incumbent
- Assumed office 11 May 2021

Personal details
- Born: 8 May 1981 (age 44) Herdecke
- Party: Social Democratic Party (since 2004)

Dorothea Kliche-Behnke (born 8 May 1981 in Herdecke) is a German politician serving as a member of the Landtag of Baden-Württemberg since 2021. She has served as deputy chairwoman of the Social Democratic Party in Baden-Württemberg since 2018.
