= Uli Grötsch =

German politician (born 1975)

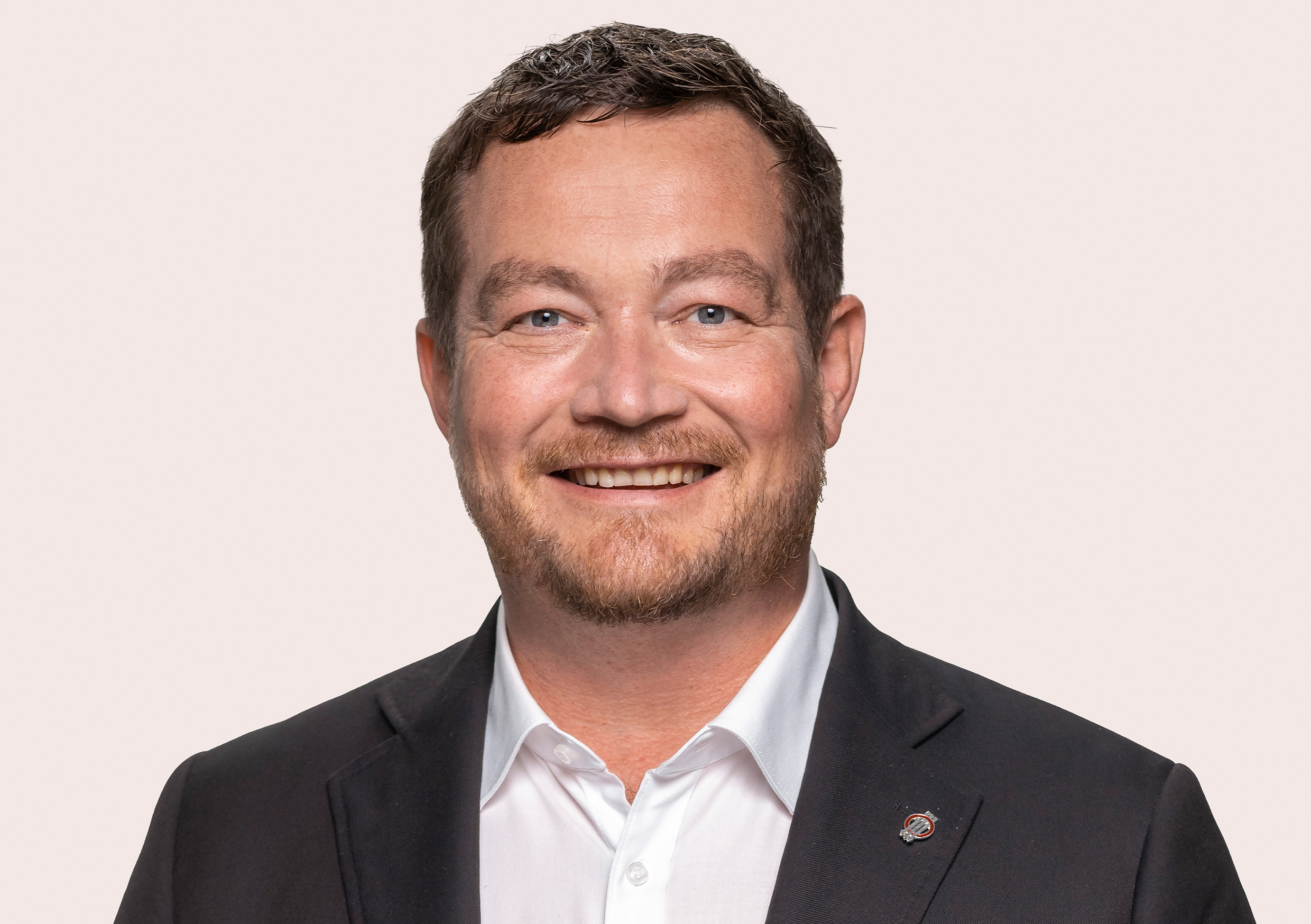
- Grötsch in 2021

Member of the Bundestag
- In office 2013–2024
- Succeeded by: Heike Heubach

Personal details
- Born: 14 July 1975 (age 50) Weiden in der Oberpfalz, West Germany (now Germany)
- Party: SPD

Uli Grötsch (born 14 July 1975) is a German politician of the Social Democratic Party (SPD) who has been serving as the German Bundestag's Federal Police Commissioner since 2024. He previously was as a member of the Bundestag from the state of Bavaria from 2013 to 2024. Grötsch has been police officer within the Bavarian State Police for 21 years.

== Early life and career ==
After school, Grötsch completed training as a police officer with the Bavarian Police. He served in various districts. He last worked in the investigation department when he left the police department in 2013 after 21 years for his Bundestag mandate.

== Political career ==
Grötsch first became a member of the Bundestag in the 2013 German federal election. He is a member of the Committee on Home Affairs. In 2014, he also joined the Parliamentary Oversight Panel (PKGr), which provides parliamentary oversight of Germany's intelligence services BND, BfV and MAD.

From 2018, Grötsch was part of a cross-party working group on a reform of Germany’s electoral system, chaired by Wolfgang Schäuble.

In early 2021, Grötsch was chosen to lead his party's campaign for the national elections. Shortly after, he lost a vote to succeed Natascha Kohnen as chair of the SPD in Bavaria.

== Federal Police Commissioner ==
Grötsch was elected to the first Federal Police Commissioner in 2023.

The Federal Police Commissioner has the task of identifying and investigating structural deficiencies and undesirable developments in the Federal Police, the Federal Criminal Police Office and the police at the German Bundestag (federal police authorities). It also investigates misconduct by employees of the federal police authorities, in particular that which results in a violation of fundamental rights, in particular Article 3 of the Basic Law (prohibition of discrimination).The commissioner has a team of 18 employees working on his staff.

Grötsch sees the compatibility of membership in the right-wing extremist AfD and serving as a police officer as problematic. The vigilance of emergency services against right-wing extremism must be heightened, he said in March 2024.

== Other activities ==
- Business Forum of the Social Democratic Party of Germany, Member of the Political Advisory Board (since 2020)
- Federal Agency for Civic Education (BPB), Member of the Board of Trustees
- Trade Union of the Police (GdP), Member
- Gegen Vergessen – Für Demokratie, Member
