= Felix Banaszak =

German politician (born 1989)

Felix Banaszak MdB
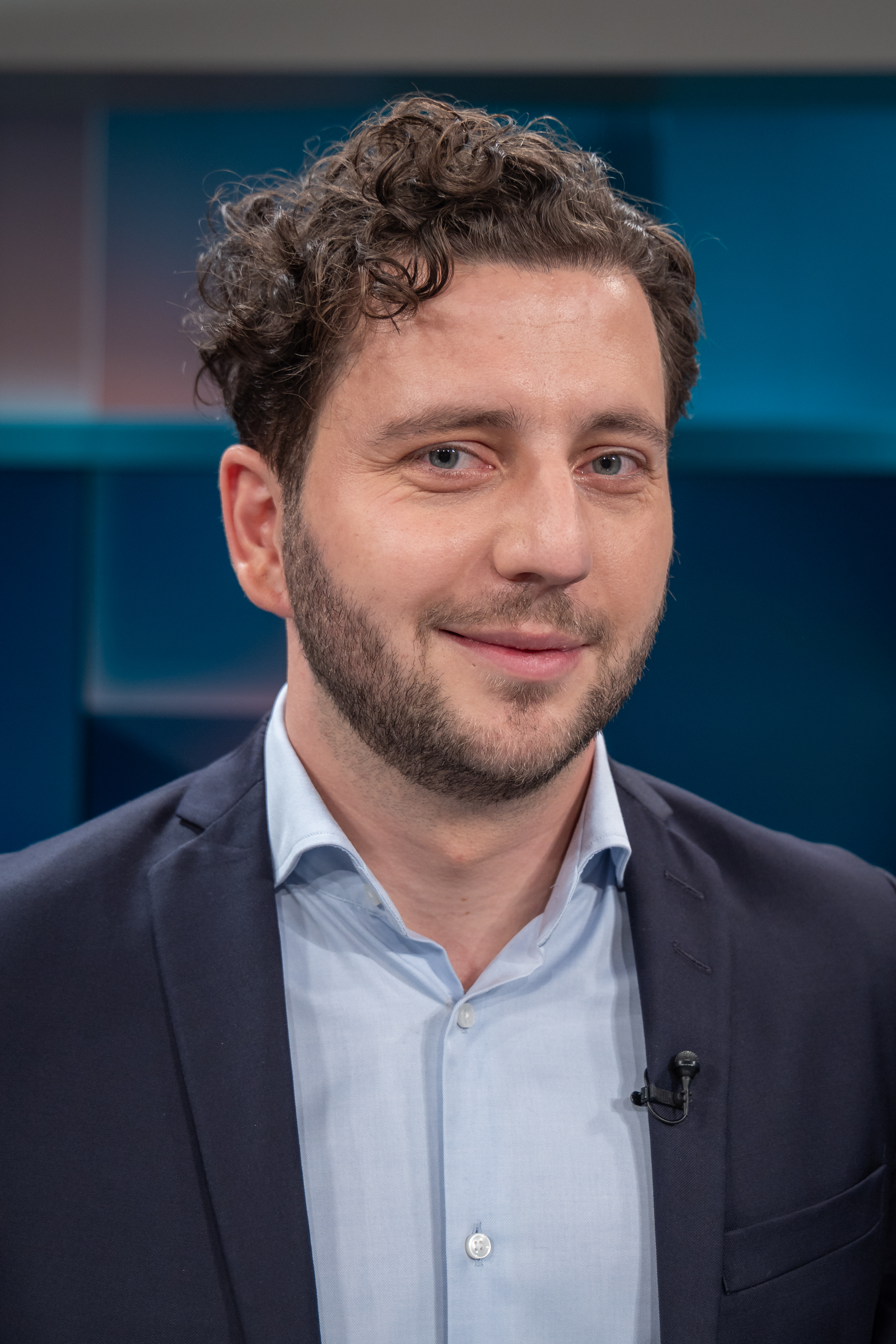
- Banaszak in 2024

Leader of Alliance 90/The Greens
- Incumbent
- Assumed office 16 November 2024 Serving with Franziska Brantner
- Deputy: Sven Giegold; Heiko Knopf; Manuela Rottmann
- Preceded by: Omid Nouripour

Member of the Bundestag
- Incumbent
- Assumed office 26 October 2021

Leader of the Green Youth
- In office 2013–2014 Serving with Theresa Kalmer
- Preceded by: Jens Parker
- Succeeded by: Georg Kurz

Personal details
- Born: 24 October 1989 (age 36) Duisburg, North Rhine-Westphalia, West Germany
- Party: Alliance 90/The Greens
- Education: Free University of Berlin (BA)

Felix Banaszak (born 24 October 1989) is a German politician of the Alliance 90/The Greens who has been serving as a member of the Bundestag since the 2021 German federal election.

Since 2024, Banaszak has also been serving as co-leader of Alliance 90/The Greens, alongside Franziska Brantner.

== Education and early career ==
Banaszak was born on 24 October 1989 in Duisburg. He attended Steinbart-Gymnasium from 2000 to 2009, graduating with a Abitur. He then attended the Free University of Berlin from 2010−2014, obtaining a Bachelor of Arts after studying social anthropology, cultural anthropology, and political science.

During his studies, Banaszak worked as legislative assistant to Dirk Behrendt at the State Parliament of Berlin. From 2014 to 2017, he managed the Düsseldorf offices of Members of the European Parliament Terry Reintke and Sven Giegold.

== Political career ==
From 2013 to 2014, Banaszak co-chaired the Green Youth on the national level, alongside Theresa Kalmer.

Along with Volker Beck, Terry Reintke and Max Lucks, Banaszak was temporarily detained when Beck wanted to speak publicly at Istanbul Pride in June 2016.

From 2018 to 2022, Banaszak served as co-chair of the Green Party in North Rhine-Westphalia, alongside Mona Neubaur.

=== Member of the German Parliament, 2021–present ===
In the negotiations to form a so-called traffic light coalition of the Social Democrats (SPD), the Green Party and the Free Democratic Party (FDP) following the 2021 federal elections, Banaszak led his party's delegation in the working group on education policy; his co-chairs from the other parties were Andreas Stoch and Jens Brandenburg.

Banaszak has been a member of the German Bundestag since 2021, elected after having been chosen for rank 6 on the NRW Green Party's closed state list. He also ran in the Duisburg II district, where he came in 4th in both elections. In parliament, he served on the Budget Committee, the Audit Committee and the Committee on Economic Affairs. On the Budget Committee, he was his parliamentary group's rapporteur on the annual budgets of the Federal Ministry for Economic Affairs and Climate Action and the Federal Ministry for Economic Cooperation and Development. On the Committee on Economic Affairs, he was his group's rapporteur on industrial policy and the energy sector.

In addition to his committee assignments, Banaszak has been a member of the German delegation to the Franco-German Parliamentary Assembly since 2022.

In the negotiations to form a coalition government of the Christian Democratic Union (CDU) and the Green Party under Minister-President of North Rhine-Westphalia Hendrik Wüst following the 2022 state elections, Banaszak and Sven Giegold led their party's delegation in the working group on finances; their counterparts from the CDU were Lutz Lienenkämper and Günter Krings.

== Other activities ==
- GIZ, Member of the supervisory board (since 2022)
- IG Metall, Member (since 2021)
- Sea-Watch, Member (since 2015)
- German United Services Trade Union (ver.di), Member (since 2014)

== Political positions ==
Within the Green Party, Banaszak is considered to be part of its left wing.

In his capacity as co-chair of the Green Youth, Banaszak opposed a 2014 motion to make the group's membership incompatible with a membership for Rote Hilfe e.V., a German far-left prisoner support group.

== Personal life ==
Banaszak has lived in Duisburg since 2014. He is bisexual, married to a woman and has a daughter (*2022).
