= Young Socialists in the SPD =

German volunteer youth organization

Working Group of Young Socialists in the SPD Arbeitsgemeinschaft der Jungsozialistinnen und Jungsozialisten in der SPD
- Chairperson: Philipp Türmer
- Founded: 1918; 1946 (refounded)
- Headquarters: Berlin, Germany
- Membership: 50,000+ (2025)
- Ideology: Democratic socialism Social democracy Feminism; Internationalism; Anti-capitalism
- Position: Centre-left to left-wing
- Mother party: Social Democratic Party of Germany
- International affiliation: International Union of Socialist Youth
- European affiliation: Young European Socialists
- Website: www.jusos.de

Working Group of Young Socialists in the SPD (German: Arbeitsgemeinschaft der Jungsozialistinnen und Jungsozialisten in der SPD, Jusos) is a volunteer youth organization of the Social Democratic Party of Germany (SPD).

As of 2025, there are over 50,000 official Juso members.

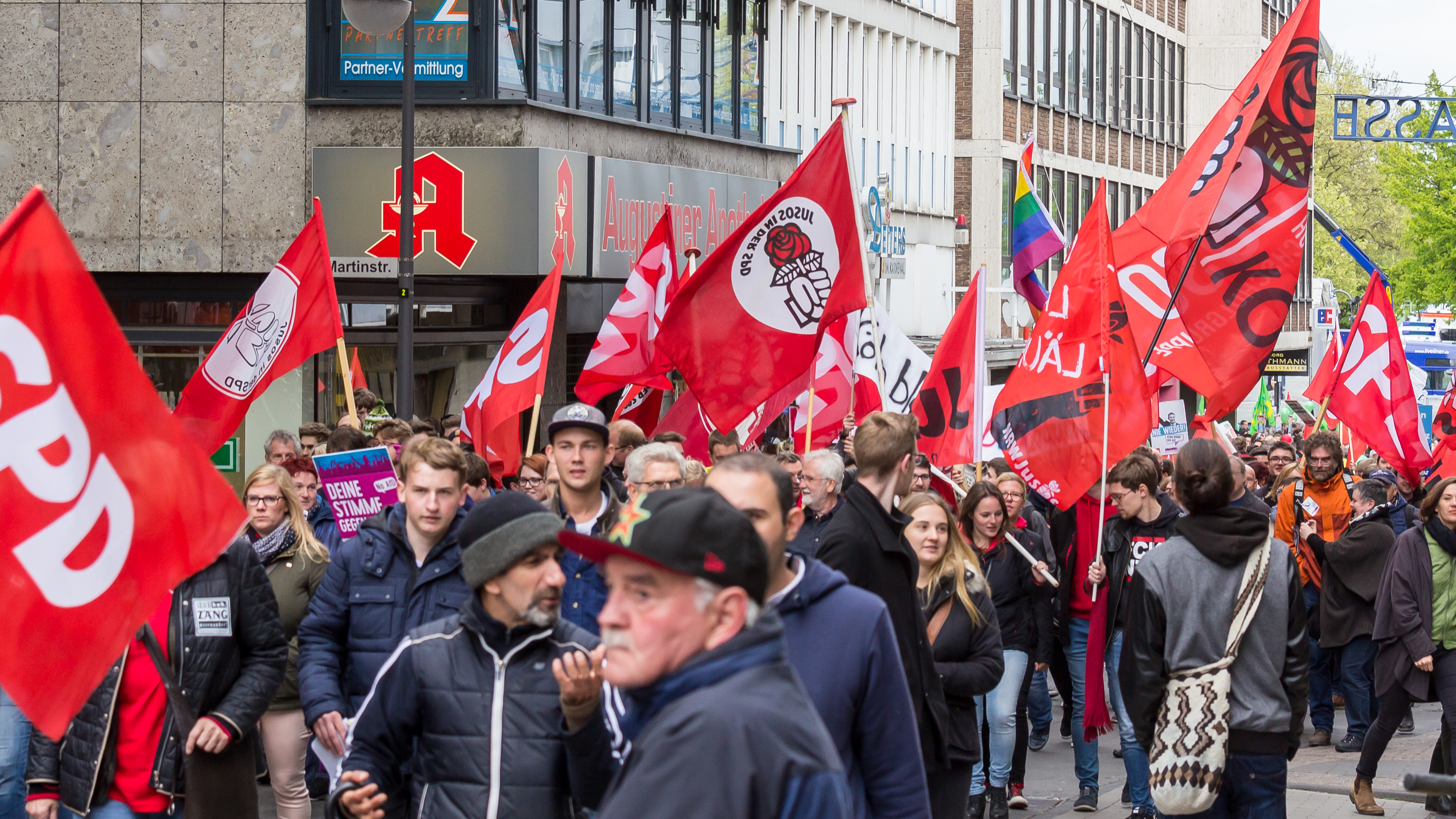
Juso-flags on a demonstration in Cologne

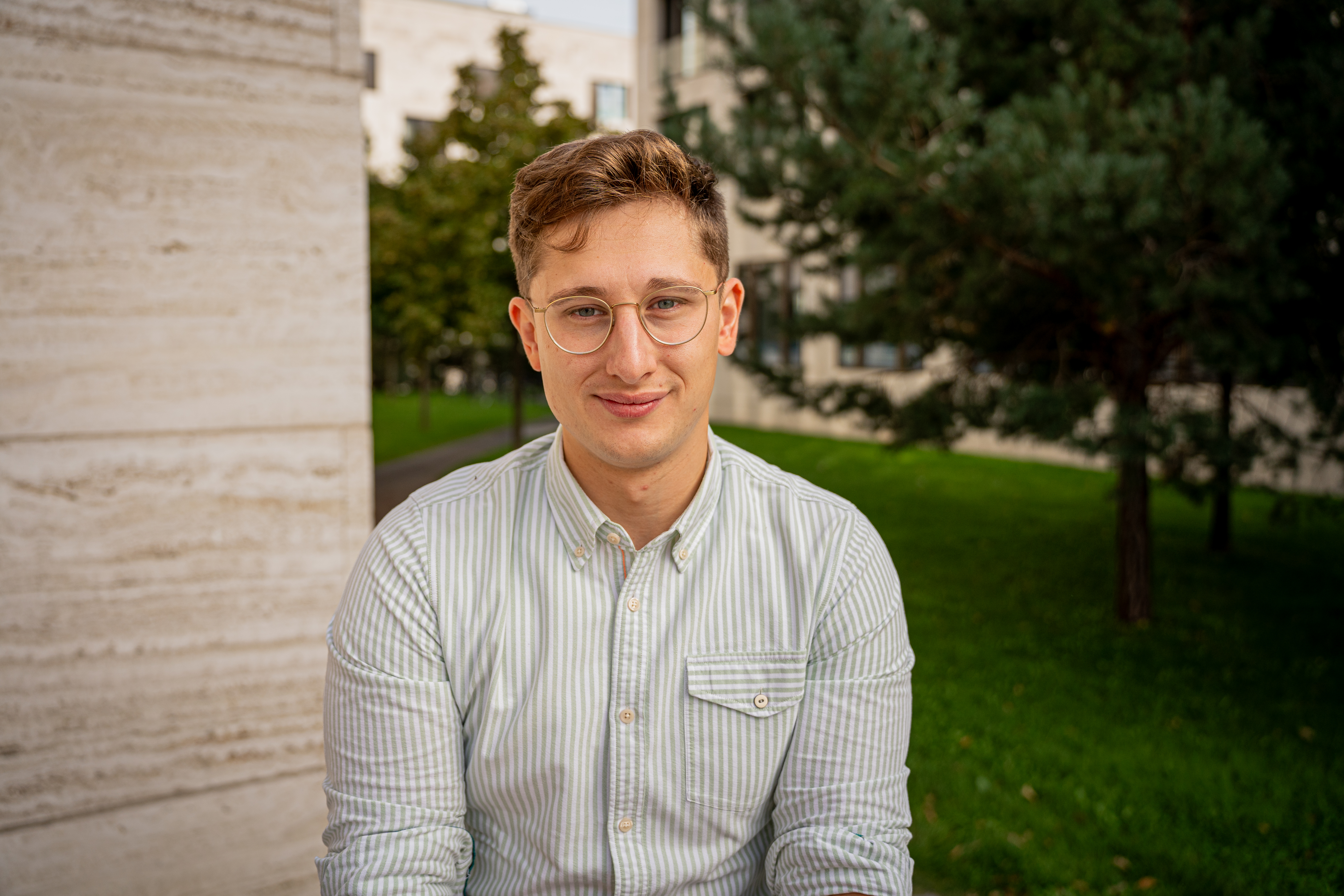
Philipp Thürmer, federal leader of the Jusos

== Membership ==
Every member of the SPD who is aged between 14 and 35 years old is automatically enrolled in the Jusos. Since 1994, people in that age group have been able to become a Juso member without party membership. Until 2011 membership was free, but ended after a two 2-year period. There is now a membership fee of €1 per month. It is only possible to be a member of the Jusos until you reach your 35th birthday.

== History ==
=== 1918–1969 ===
At the Reichsjugendtag (Reich Youth Day) of the Majority Social Democratic Party of Germany for young workers in Weimar in 1920, in which around 1,000 young people took part, the focus was on dealing with nature, art and culture and less on political issues. The main speaker was the spokesman for the Magdeburg young workers, 19-year-old Erich Ollenhauer, who identified the founding of the republic as a necessary condition for the young workers' movement to gain strength. Here, the later party song of the SPD, Wann wir schreiten Seit’ an Seit’, was presented to the participants. Overall, the Workers' Youth Day took a positive stance on the policies of the mother party M-SPD. Following the Arbeiterjugendtag (Workers' Youth Day), the Verband der Arbeiterjugendvereine Deutschlands (Association of Workers' Youth Associations in Germany) held its first national conference.

The Jusos were founded between 1918 and 1920, when groups of members of the SPD between 20 and 25 years of age began to meet. In terms of numbers, the Jusos remained small, with between 3,000 and 5,000 members. They were dissolved in 1931 as a result of an internal controversy.

After the end of World War II, the Jusos were reestablished in 1946. The Young Socialists, were initially just a working group of the Social Democratic Party. The SPD wanted to bind young people more closely to the party, which was initially successful. In the 1950s, the Jusos were a loyal youth organization; a relatively indistinctive wing of the SPD.

=== Move to the left in 1969 ===
From the mid-1960s onwards the German wing of the student movement in many western countries, the extra-parliamentary opposition (APO), was directed against the suppression of the Nazi past, the Vietnam War and the German Emergency Acts. This led to a strong politicization of the Juso base and a left turn was achieved. On the Juso Federal Congress (Bundeskongress) 1969 they decided to become a left-wing political federation in their own right instead of being simply an extension of the SPD. The congress began with the scandal that the delegates booed the SPD Federal Managing Director (Bundesgeschäftsführer) Hans-Jürgen Wischnewski, who had come as a guest, and described him as incompetent and his planned presentation was voted off the agenda. Chairman of Jusos Peter Corterier's statement of accounts was also voted off the agenda, and he then offered his immediate resignation, which the Congress declined. Since then, the Jusos have seen themselves as a socialist and feminist association within the SPD.

In the same year, the party executive decided that the Juso federal secretary should be subject to the instructions of the Juso federal executive.

From then on, the Jusos developed into an independent, socialist youth association that was involved in the party and in social movements at the same time. Jusos were involved in the peace movement, international solidarity movements, West German anti-nuclear movement and anti-fascist movements. The content of these movements was to be brought into the party, which led to tough disputes between the party and the Jusos in the 1970s.

=== Up from 1990 ===
In the course of the upheaval in the GDR, a youth organization was founded there in 1990, which initially called itself Young Social Democrats. Since 1991 the youth association in all parts of the Federal Republic of Germany is called Jusos.

In 2017 Kevin Kühnert was elected as chair-men of Jusos. At the SPD federal party conference in December 2019, Kühnert was elected as the first incumbent federal chairman of the Jusos, as deputy party chairman of the SPD at the same time. In 2021 he was elected secretary general of the SPD.
