= Jens Brandenburg =

German politician (born 1986)

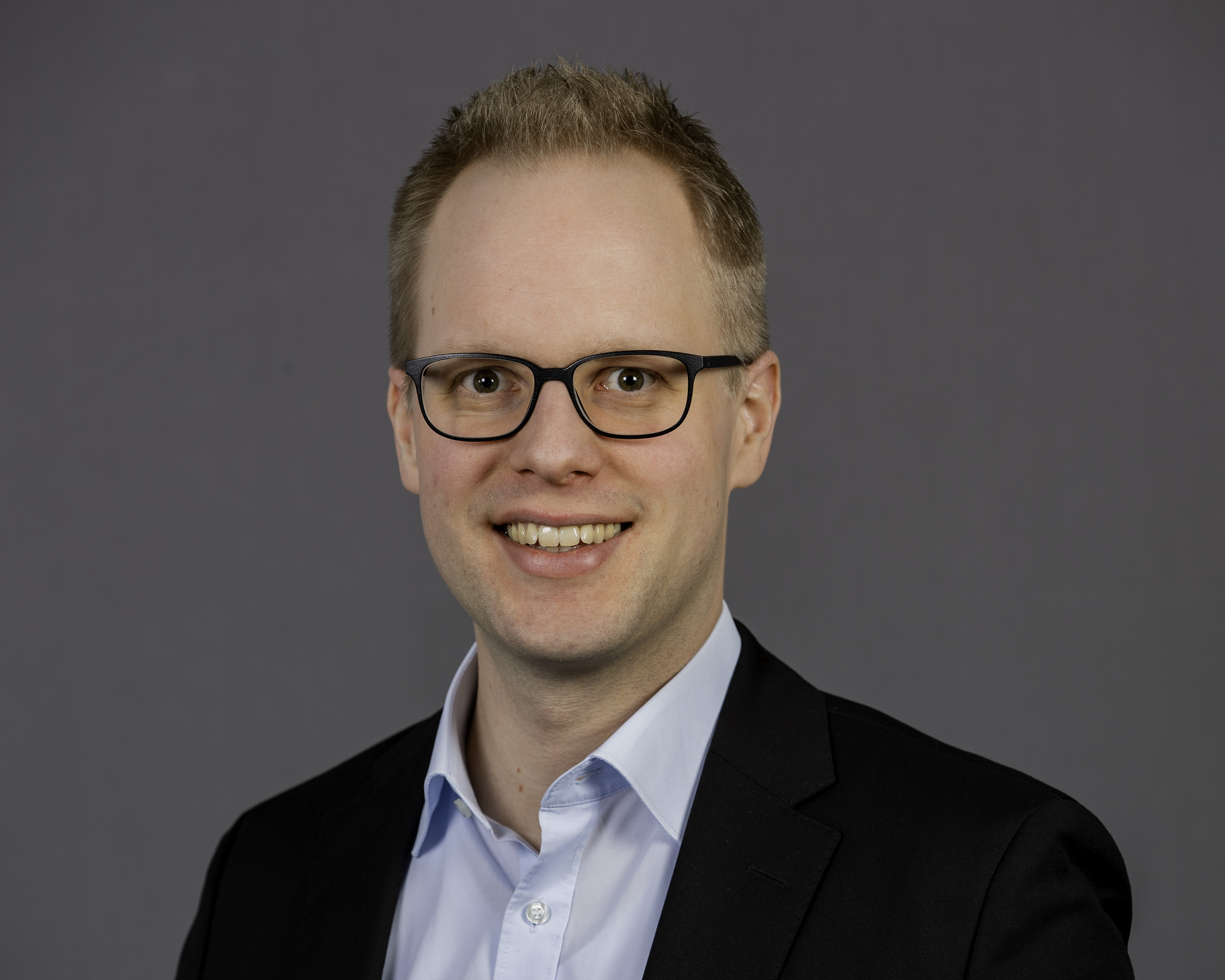
- Brandenburg in 2020

Member of the Bundestag for Baden-Württemberg
- In office 24 October 2017 – 2025
- Constituency: FDP List

Personal details
- Born: 8 March 1986 (age 40) Simmerath, West Germany (now Germany)
- Party: Free Democratic Party
- Education: University of Mannheim

Jens Brandenburg (born 8 March 1986) is a German politician of the Free Democratic Party (FDP) who served as a member of the Bundestag from the state of Baden-Württemberg from 2017 to 2025.

In addition to his parliamentary work, Brandenburg served as Parliamentary State Secretary to Federal Minister of Education and Research Bettina Stark-Watzinger from 2021 to 2024.

== Early life and career ==
Born in Simmerath, North Rhine-Westphalia, Brandenburg graduated from high school in Monschau in 2005. He then studied political science and economics at the University of Mannheim until 2010, graduating with a Bachelor's and master's degree. From 2010 to 2014 Brandenburg received his doctorate from the Graduate School of Economics and Social Science at the University of Mannheim.

After receiving his doctorate, Brandenburg worked for the Boston Consulting Group from 2014 until 2017. Brandenburg lives with his partner in Kurpfalz.

== Political career ==
Brandenburg has been a member of the FDP since 2006.

From 2018 until 2021, Brandenburg was member of the Committee for Education, Research and Technology Assessment. During that time, he also served as his parliamentary group's spokesperson for studies, vocational training, lifelong learning and the rights of LSBTI.

In addition to his committee assignments, Brandenburg was part of the German Parliamentary Friendship Group for Relations with the Cono Sur States.

In the negotiations to form a so-called traffic light coalition of the Social Democrats (SPD), the Green Party and the FDP following the 2021 federal elections, Brandenburg led his party's delegation in the working group on education policy; his co-chairs from the other parties were Andreas Stoch and Felix Banaszak.

== Other activities ==
- Magnus Hirschfeld Foundation, Member of the Board of Trustees (since 2018)
