= Leni Breymaier =

German politician

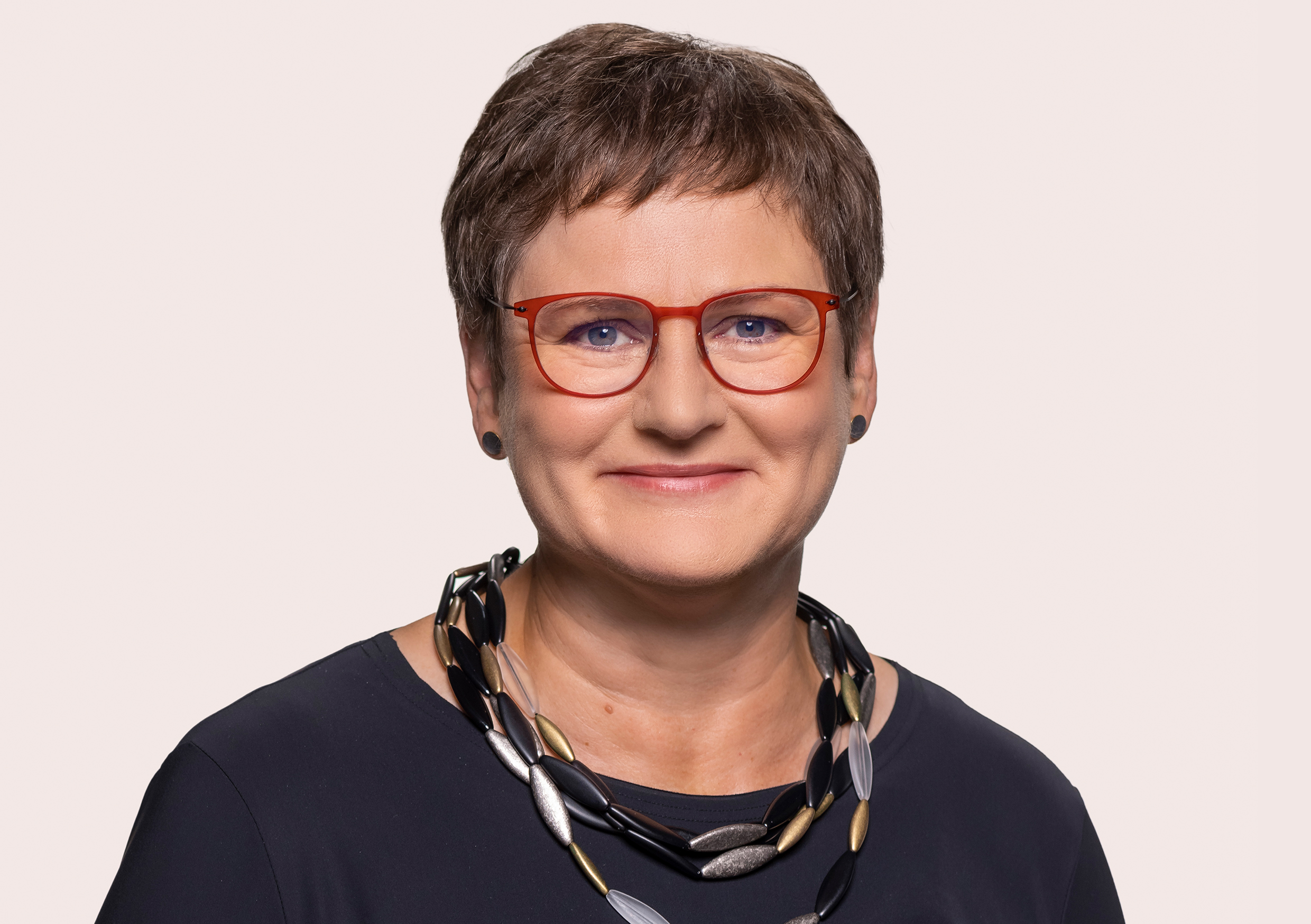
- Breymaier in 2021

Member of the Bundestag
- Incumbent
- Assumed office 2017

Personal details
- Born: 26 April 1960 (age 66) Ulm, West Germany
- Party: German: Social Democratic Party; EU: Party of European Socialists

Leni Breymaier (born 26 April 1960) is a German politician of the Social Democratic Party of Germany (SPD).

== Life and political career ==
Breymaier was born in 1960 in Ulm and became an SPD member in 1982.

From 2016 until 2018, Breymaier served as chairwoman of the SPD in the federal state of Baden-Württemberg, succeeding Nils Schmid.

=== Member of the German Parliament, 2017–present ===
Breymaier has been a member of the German Bundestag since the 2017 elections, elected on the SPD party list for Baden-Württemberg. In the negotiations to form a coalition government under the leadership of Chancellor Angela Merkel following the elections, she was part of the working group on municipalities and rural areas, led by Reiner Haseloff, Kurt Gribl and Michael Groschek.

Breymaier has since been serving on the Committee on Family Affairs, Senior Citizens, Women and Youth, where she is her parliamentary group's rapporteur on demographic transition, pensions, and forced prostitution. In 2019, she initiated a cross-party working group in support of a ban on prostitution.

Since the 2021 elections, Breymaier has been serving as her parliamentary group’s spokesperson for family affairs, senior citizens, women and youth. Since 2022, she has also been serving on the parliamentary body in charge of appointing judges to the Highest Courts of Justice, namely the Federal Court of Justice (BGH), the Federal Administrative Court (BVerwG), the Federal Fiscal Court (BFH), the Federal Labour Court (BAG), and the Federal Social Court (BSG). That same year, she joined the Commission for the Reform of the Electoral Law and the Modernization of Parliamentary Work, co-chaired by Johannes Fechner and Nina Warken.

In addition to her committee assignments, Breymaier is a member of the German-Israeli Parliamentary Friendship Group. Within the SPD parliamentary group, she belongs to the Parliamentary Left, a left-wing movement.

In the negotiations to form a coalition government between the SPD, the Green Party and Free Democratic Party (FDP) following the 2021 federal elections, Breymaier was part of her party's delegation in the working group on equality, co-chaired by Petra Köpping, Ricarda Lang and Herbert Mertin. In 2024, Breymaier announced, that she isn't seeking re-election for Bundestag.

== Other activities ==
=== Corporate boards ===
- Bausparkasse Schwäbisch Hall, Member of the Supervisory Board (-2018)
- Barmer, Member of the Supervisory Board (1999-2005, 2008-2010)

=== Non-profit organizations ===
- Willy Brandt Center Jerusalem, Member (since 2018)
- Union of Persecutees of the Nazi Regime (VNN), Member (since 2010)
- German United Services Trade Union (ver.di), Member (since 1976)

== Personal life ==
Since 1986, Breymaier has been living in Eislingen.
