= List of members of the Lower Saxon Landtag 2008–2013 =

This is a list of the members of the Lower Saxon Landtag in the period 2008 to 2013. This is the sixteenth period. The members were elected in the election of 27 January 2008.

== Overview ==

A total of 152 representatives were elected, distributed as follows:

- 10 to The Left (Die Linke)
- 48 to the Social Democratic Party (Sozialdemokratische Partei Deutschlands)
- 12 to the Alliance '90/The Greens (Bündnis 90/Die Grünen)
- 68 to the Christian Democratic Union (Christlich Demokratische Union Deutschlands)
- 13 to the Free Democratic Party (Freie Demokratische Partei)
- 1 independent

Out of these representatives, the second cabinet Wulff was formed.

== List of representatives ==
Name	Party	Comments
Thomas Adasch	Christian Democratic	
Hans-Henning Adler	The Left	
Johann-Heinrich Ahlers	Christian Democratic	
Heinrich Aller	Social Democratic	
Bernd Althusmann	Christian Democratic	
Gabriele Andretta	Social Democratic	
Klaus-Peter Bachmann	Social Democratic	
Heiner Bartling	Social Democratic	
Martin Bäumer	Christian Democratic	
Karin Bertholdes-Sandrock	Christian Democratic	
Hans-Christian Biallas	Christian Democratic	
Uwe Biester	Christian Democratic	
Stefan Birkner	Free Democratic	Left on 27 February 2008, was replaced by Christian Grascha
Karl-Heinz Bley	Christian Democratic	
Jörg Bode	Free Democratic	
Norbert Böhlke	Christian Democratic	
Ralf Borngräber	Social Democratic	
Marcus Bosse	Social Democratic	
Axel Brammer	Social Democratic	
Hennig Brandes	Christian Democratic	
Ralf Briese	Greens	
Markus Brinkmann	Social Democratic	
Emil Brockstedt	Christian Democratic	
Marco Brunotte	Social Democratic	
Bernd Busemann	Christian Democratic	Member of the cabinet McAllister
Reinhold Coenen	Christian Democratic	
Helmut Dammann-Tamke	Christian Democratic	
Karl-Ludwig von Danwitz	Christian Democratic	
Hans-Joachim Deneke-Jöhrens	Christian Democratic	
Otto Deppmeyer	Christian Democratic	
Hermann Dinkla	Christian Democratic	President of the Parliament (German: Landtagspräsident)
Christoph Dreyer	Christian Democratic	
Christian Dürr	Free Democratic	
Hans-Heinrich Ehlen	Christian Democratic	Member of the cabinet McAllister
Petra Emmerich-Kopatsch	Social Democratic	
Ursula Ernst	Christian Democratic	
Kreszentia Flauger	The Left	
Ansgar-Bernhard Focke	Christian Democratic	
Björn Försterling	Free Democratic	
Renate Geuter	Social Democratic	
Ulla Groskurt	Social Democratic	
Rudolf Götz	Christian Democratic	
Hans-Dieter Haase	Social Democratic	
Enno Hagenah	Greens	
Swantje Hartmann	Social Democratic	
Karl Heinz Hausmann	Social Democratic	
Wilhelm Heidemann	Christian Democratic	
Frauke Heiligenstadt	Social Democratic	
Karsten Heineking	Christian Democratic	
Gabriele Heinen-Kljajic	Greens	
Ursula Helmhold	Greens	
Kurt Herzog	The Left	
Bernd-Carsten Hiebing	Christian Democratic	
Reinhold Hilbers	Christian Democratic	
Jörg Hillmer	Christian Democratic	
Wilhelm Hogrefe	Christian Democratic	
Ernst-August Hoppenbrock	Christian Democratic	
Patrick Humke-Focks	The Left	
Carsten Höttcher	Christian Democratic	
Angelika Jahns	Christian Democratic	
Wolfgang Jüttner	Social Democratic	
Karl-Heinz Klare	Christian Democratic	
Hans-Jürgen Klein	Greens	
Stefan Klein	Social Democratic	
Ingrid Klopp	Christian Democratic	
Lothar Koch	Christian Democratic	
Gabriela König	Free Democratic	
Marianne König	The Left	
Gabriela Kohlenberg	Christian Democratic	
Gisela Konrath	Christian Democratic	
Ina Korter	Greens	
Ursula Körtner	Christian Democratic	
Daniela Krause-Behrens	Social Democratic	
Jürgen Krogmann	Social Democratic	
Klaus Krumfuß	Christian Democratic	
Clemens Lammerskitten	Christian Democratic	
Karl-Heinrich Langspecht	Christian Democratic	
Silke Lesemann	Social Democratic	
Sigrid Leuschner	Social Democratic	
Olaf Lies	Social Democratic	
Helge Limburg	Greens	
Editha Lorberg	Christian Democratic	
Clemens große Macke	Christian Democratic	
Max Matthiesen	Christian Democratic	
David McAllister	Christian Democratic	Minister-President (German: Ministerpräsident)
Gesine Meißner	Free Democratic	
Christian Meyer	Greens	
Rolf Meyer	Social Democratic	
Anette Meyer zu Strohen	Christian Democratic	
Axel Miesner	Christian Democratic	
Frank Mindermann	Christian Democratic	
Johanne Modder	Social Democratic	
Matthias Möhle	Social Democratic	
Dieter Möhrmann	Social Democratic	
Hartmut Möllring	Christian Democratic	Member of the cabinet McAllister
Heidemarie Mundlos	Christian Democratic	
Jens Nacke	Christian Democratic	
Matthias Nerlich	Christian Democratic	
Frank Oesterhelweg	Christian Democratic	
Jan-Christoph Oetjen	Free Democratic	
Victor Perli	The Left	
Gudrun Pieper	Christian Democratic	
Filiz Polat	Greens	
Stefan Politze	Social Democratic	
Claus Peter Poppe	Social Democratic	
Dorothee Prüssner	Christian Democratic	
Sigrid Rakow	Social Democratic	
Christa Reichwaldt	The Left	
Klaus Rickert	Free Democratic	
Roland Riese	Free Democratic	
Heinz Rolfes	Christian Democratic	
Philipp Rösler	Free Democratic	resigned
Mechthild Ross-Luttmann	Christian Democratic	Member of the cabinet McAllister
Jutta Rübke	Social Democratic	
Hans-Heinrich Sander	Free Democratic	
Ronald Schminke	Social Democratic	
Klaus Schneck	Social Democratic	
Wittich Schobert	Christian Democratic	
Heiner Schönecke	Christian Democratic	
Stefan Schostok	Social Democratic	
Andrea Schröder-Ehlers	Social Democratic	
Uwe Schünemann	Christian Democratic	Member of the cabinet McAllister
Hans-Werner Schwarz	Free Democratic	
Uwe Schwarz	Social Democratic	
Kai Seefried	Christian Democratic	
Silva Seeler	Social Democratic	
Wiard Siebels	Social Democratic	
Stephan August Siemer	Christian Democratic	
Manfred Sohn	The Left	
Brigitte Somfleth	Social Democratic	
Miriam Staudte	Greens	
Karin Stief-Kreihe	Social Democratic	
Detlef Tanke	Social Democratic	
Ulf Thiele	Christian Democratic	
Björn Thümler	Christian Democratic	
Petra Tiemann	Social Democratic	
Sabine Tippelt	Social Democratic	
Dirk Toepffer	Christian Democratic	
Grant Hendrik Tonne	Social Democratic	
Elke Twesten	Greens	
Astrid Vockert	Christian Democratic	
Ulrich Watermann	Social Democratic	
Dörthe Weddige-Degenhard	Social Democratic	
Christel Wegner	Independent	Elected for The Left, but was expelled from that party on 18 February 2008.
Ursula Weisser-Roelle	The Left	
Stefan Wenzel	Greens	
André Wiese	Christian Democratic	
Gerd Ludwig Will	Social Democratic	
Wolfgang Wulf	Social Democratic	
Christian Wulff	Christian Democratic	resigned 11 June 2010
Roland Zielke	Free Democratic	
Pia-Beate Zimmermann	The Left	
