= Cabinet McAllister =

State government of Lower Saxony, Germany (2010–2013)

Cabinet of David McAllister Cabinet McAllister
- 26th Cabinet of Lower Saxony
- 1 July 2010 – 19 February 2013
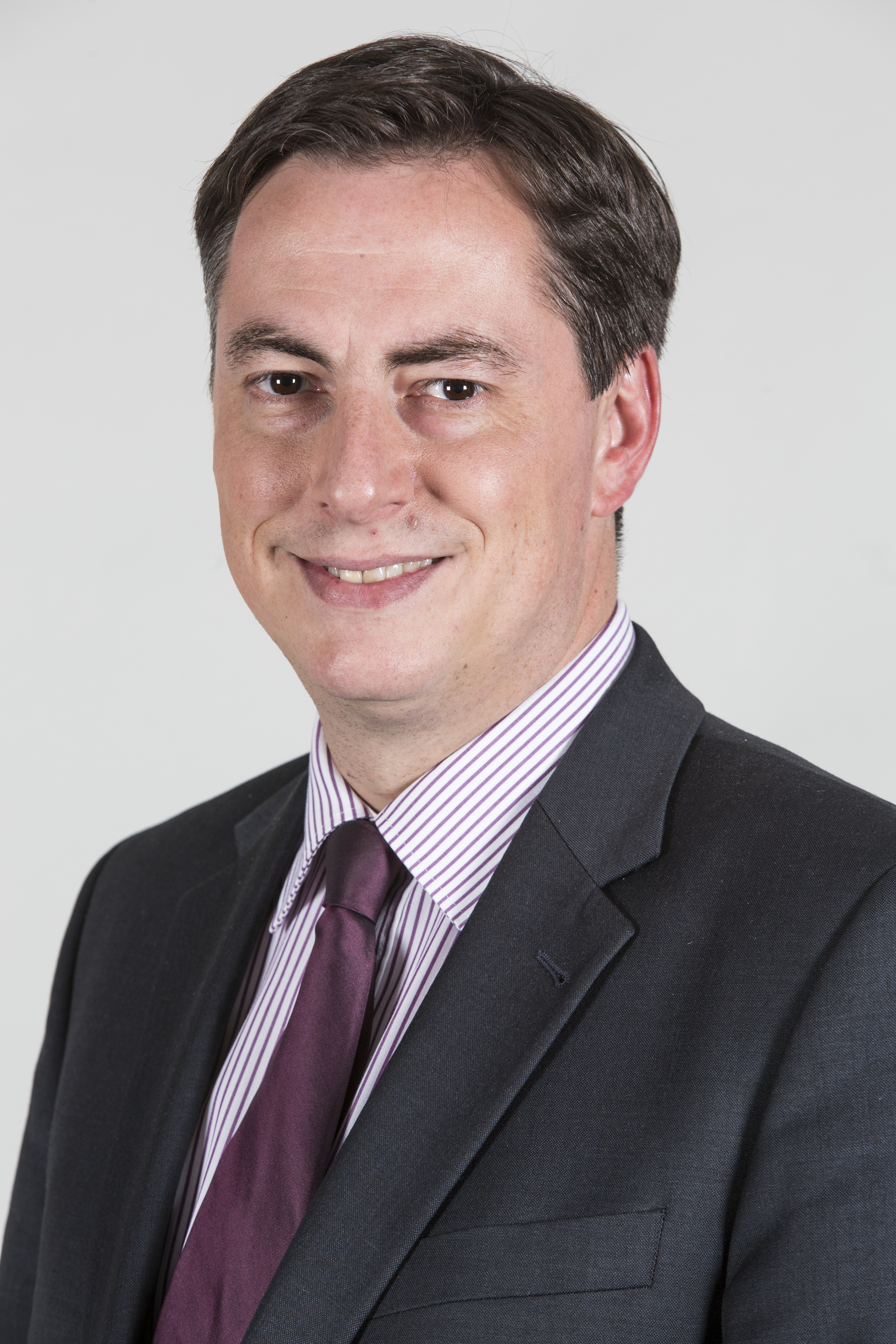
- David McAllister
- Date formed: 1 July 2010
- Date dissolved: 19 February 2013 (2 years, 7 months, 2 weeks and 4 days)

People and organisations
- Chancellor: Angela Merkel
- Minister President: David McAllister
- Member party: Christian Democratic Union; Free Democratic Party
- Status in legislature: Coalition government (Majority)
- Opposition party: Social Democratic Party; Alliance 90/The Greens
- Opposition leader: Social Democratic Party

History
- Election: 2008 Lower Saxony state election
- Legislature term: 14th Landtag of Lower Saxony
- Predecessor: Cabinet Wulff II
- Successor: Cabinet Weil I

The Cabinet McAllister was the state government of the German state of Lower Saxony from 1 July 2010 to 19 February 2013. The Cabinet was headed by Minister President David McAllister. After the election of Christian Wulff as president of Germany, McAllister was elected and sworn in as Minister President by the Landtag of Lower Saxony on 1 July 2010.

It is notable for being the first modern cabinet in Germany headed by a person holding dual citizenship (German and British), although Germany, its states and its various predecessors have previously had many politicians of foreign, including French, Polish, Italian and Slovene, ancestry.

== Composition ==
Portfolio	Minister	Took office	Left office	Party
Minister President	David McAllister	1 July 2010	19 February 2013	CDU
Deputy Minister President & Economics, Labour and Transport	Jörg Bode	1 July 2010	19 February 2013	FDP
Minister of the Interior and Sports	Uwe Schünemann	1 July 2010	19 February 2013	CDU
Minister of Finance	Hartmut Möllring	1 July 2010	19 February 2013	CDU
Minister of Justice	Bernd Busemann	1 July 2010	19 February 2013	CDU
Minister of Education	Bernd Althusmann	1 July 2010	19 February 2013	CDU
Minister of Social Affairs, Women and Families, Health and Integration	Aygül Özkan	1 July 2010	19 February 2013	CDU
Minister of Science and Culture	Johanna Wanka	1 July 2010	19 February 2013	CDU
Minister of the Environment and Climate Protection	Hans-Heinrich Sander	1 July 2010	19 February 2013	FDP
Minister of Food, Agriculture, Consumer Protection and Regional Development	Astrid Grotelüschen	1 July 2010	17 December 2010	CDU
Minister of Food, Agriculture, Consumer Protection and Regional Development	Hans-Heinrich Sander (Acting)	17 December 2010	19 January 2011	CDU
Minister of Food, Agriculture, Consumer Protection and Regional Development	Gert Lindemann	19 January 2011	19 February 2013	CDU
