= Cabinet Wulff II =

Second Cabinet of Christian Wulff Cabinet Wulff II
- 25th Cabinet of Lower Saxony
- 26 February 2008 – 1 July 2010
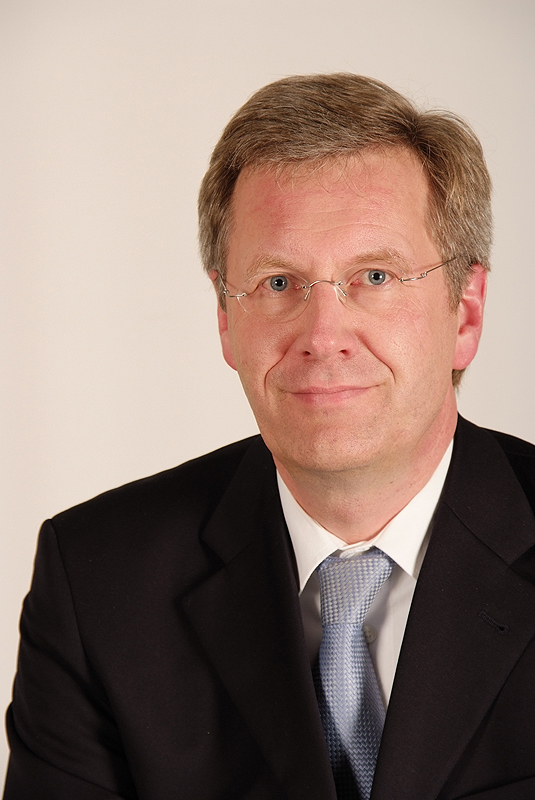
- Christian Wulff
- Date formed: 26 February 2008
- Date dissolved: 1 July 2010 (1 year, 10 months, 1 week and 5 days)

People and organisations
- Chancellor: Angela Merkel
- Minister President: Christian Wulff
- Member party: Christian Democratic Union; Free Democratic Party
- Status in legislature: Coalition government (Majority)
- Opposition party: Social Democratic Party; Alliance 90/The Greens
- Opposition leader: Social Democratic Party

History
- Election: 2008 Lower Saxony state election
- Legislature term: 16th Landtag of Lower Saxony
- Predecessor: Cabinet Wulff I
- Successor: Cabinet McAllister

The Cabinet Wulff II was the state government of the German state of Lower Saxony from 26 February 2008 until 1 July 2010. The Cabinet was headed by Minister President Christian Wulff and was formed by the Christian Democratic Union and the Free Democratic Party. On 26 February 2008 Wulff was re-elected and sworn in as Minister President by the Landtag of Lower Saxony, after Wulff's winning of the 2008 Lower Saxony state election.

On 30 June 2010, Christian Wulff resigned as Minister President hours before taking office as President of Germany

== Composition ==
Portfolio	Minister	Took office	Left office	Party
Minister President	Christian Wulff	26 February 2008	30 June 2010	CDU
Deputy Minister President & Economics, Labour and Transport	Walter Hirche	26 February 2008	18 February 2009	FDP
Deputy Minister President & Economics, Labour and Transport	Philipp Rösler	18 February 2009	27 October 2009	FDP
Deputy Minister President & Economics, Labour and Transport	Jörg Bode	1 July 2010	1 July 2010	FDP
Minister of the Interior and Sports	Uwe Schünemann	26 February 2008	1 July 2010	CDU
Minister of Finance	Hartmut Möllring	26 February 2008	1 July 2010	CDU
Minister of Justice	Bernd Busemann	26 February 2008	1 July 2010	CDU
Minister of Education	Elisabeth Heister-Neumann	26 February 2008	27 April 2010	CDU
Minister of Education	Bernd Althusmann	27 April 2010	1 July 2010	CDU
Minister of Social Affairs, Women and Families and Health	Mechthild Ross-Luttmann	26 February 2008	27 April 2010	CDU
Minister of Social Affairs, Women and Families and Health	Aygül Özkan	27 April 2010	1 July 2010	CDU
Minister of Science and Culture	Lutz Stratmann	26 February 2008	27 April 2010	CDU
Minister of Science and Culture	Johanna Wanka	27 April 2010	1 July 2010	CDU
Minister of the Environment	Hans-Heinrich Sander	26 February 2008	1 July 2010	FDP
Minister of Food, Agriculture, Consumer Protection and Regional Development	Hans-Heinrich Ehlen	26 February 2008	27 April 2010	CDU
Minister of Food, Agriculture, Consumer Protection and Regional Development	Astrid Grotelüschen	27 April 2010	1 July 2010	CDU
