= White IT =

White IT is an initiative with the objective to identify adequate actions against child pornography in the internet. In the context of this initiative, the delegates of victims' associations, internet companies, the IT industry and medical associations are co-operating on the basis of a Memorandum of Understanding. The name "White IT" was chosen analogously to Green IT. So far it is only active in Germany, but its long-term scope is international.

== Objectives and methods ==
Uwe Schünemann, then home secretary of the German state of Lower Saxony, initiated the initiative that was founded November 27, 2009 in Berlin. The objective is to develop concepts in an open minded and holistic approach that are:

- eligible from the medical and the victim's point of view
- socially accepted
- technically feasible
- legally possible

These aspects are to be cross-checked continuously. In May 2011 the initiative established White IT Supporters e.V., a registered association (eingetragener Verein) to provide a legal frame for its activities.

An academic study on the means of proliferation of child pornography on the internet is the initial point to start a discussion based on facts and to develop specific counter-measures. The study was realised by Bernd-Dieter Meier, professor at the Kriminalwissenschaftliches Institut (Institute for Criminology) at the Leibniz University Hannover. The study was based on the analysis of court records in Lower Saxony. The study showed that the World Wide Web just plays a minor role in the proliferation of child pornography. Based on this result the initiative focuses on the effective detection of abusive material, especially to facilitate the screening work material seized by the policy. The use of signatures (so to say the digital fingerprints) of already classified abusive material plays a pivotal role the development of further solutions. These signatures are collected at the German Bundeskriminalamt (Federal Criminal Police Office) in the PERKEO-Database and are provided to investigative authorities. The further steps are deriving from the feasibility and the legal and political evaluation of the use of these signatures beyond investigative authorities, e.g. malware detection.

Since 2010 the White IT-Symposium has been established as an interdisciplinary annual conference on the topic child of pornography and measures against it.

With the purpose of strengthening self-assertion of children and of sensitising parents for the topic of sexual abuse, the initiative funded the "Pixi-Books", books for pre-school children and their parents, published by the Carlsen Verlag publishing house. In 2012 a book of the "Pixi-Wissen" series was edited to address older children of 9 to 13 years. In 2013 White IT launched an ideas competition to create other ideas to increase the self-assertion and the awareness of the dangers to children and adolescents.

== Study on proliferation ==
The first results of the study were presented November 24 and 25 2010 at a symposium in Hannover.

The study itself was presented on May 2, 2011 in Berlin. The major results included:

- Only in a minority of cases did the provisioning or proliferation have monetary aspects. These were predominantly "rookies" who paid for criminal contents that are available for free on the internet. Yet the respective websites were often also bogus or dispreading malware.
- Most of the culprits acquired or distributed child pornography not in the World Wide Web, but in peer-to-peer-networks or other closed user groups. They were motivated by bragging and mutual exchange among like-minded people.
- A significant majority of cases were disclosed by police investigation, not by criminal complaints.
- The use of undercover police officers is limited, because newcomers must contribute child pornography themselves before being accepted in these circles. This point is actually mistaken as it fails to take in legal situations other than the German one. The FBI is allowed to distribute material and has done so in sting operations for many years. In the UK the police asked the government for similar powers to distribute images and were granted them by an act of parliament in 2003.
- All cases that came to court were most severe offences (levels seven through nine on the COPINE scale. Only explicit evidence let to indictments, yet almost all indictments let to convictions.

This study is the first empirical academic analysis of the proliferation of child pornography. On the basis of these results, counteractive measures are under development.
