= Aygül Özkan =

German politician

Aygül Özkan MdHB a. D. MdL a. D. Landesministerin a. D.
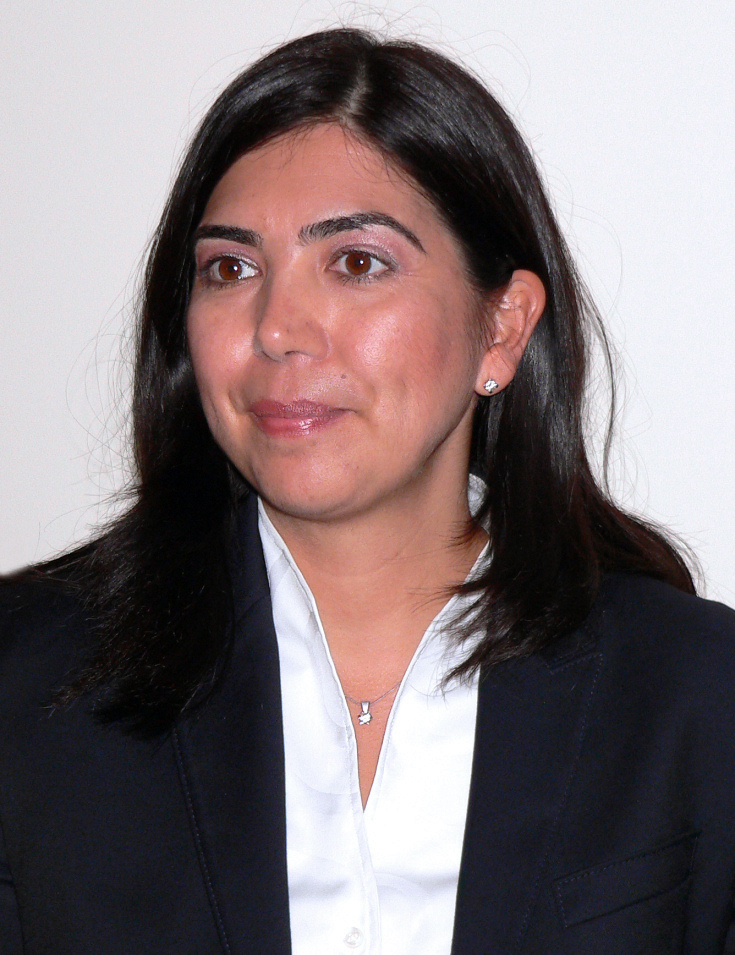
- Özkan (2011)

Minister of Social Affairs, Women and Families, Health and Integration of Lower Saxony
- In office 27 April 2010 – 19 February 2013
- Minister-President: Christian Wulff; David McAllister
- Preceded by: Mechthild Ross-Luttmann
- Succeeded by: Cornelia Rundt

Member of the Landtag of Lower Saxony
- In office 26 March 2014 – 11 July 2014
- Preceded by: David McAllister
- Succeeded by: Heidemarie Mundlos
- Constituency: Christian Democratic Union List

Member of the Hamburg Parliament
- In office 12 March 2008 – 27 April 2010
- Preceded by: multi-member district
- Succeeded by: Eckard Graage
- Constituency: Christian Democratic Union List

Personal details
- Born: August 27, 1971 (age 55) Hamburg, West Germany (now Germany)
- Party: Christian Democratic Union
- Children: 1
- Education: University of Hamburg
- Occupation: Lawyer; Politician; Lobbyist
- Website: www.aygueloezkan.de

Aygül Özkan (born 27 August 1971, in Hamburg) is a German politician of the Christian Democratic Union (CDU) who has been serving as managing director of the German Property Federation (ZIA) since 2020.

Özkan has been a member of the CDU since 2004. She served as Minister of Social Affairs, Women, Families, Health and Integration in the state of Lower Saxony, in the Second Cabinet Wulff and the Cabinet McAllister between 2010 and 2013. She was the first ever German politician of Turkish descent and a Muslim serving as minister.

== Early life and education ==
Özkan's father migrated from Ankara (Turkey) to Hamburg (West Germany) in the 1960s, where he first worked for Deutsche Bundespost and subsequently set up an independent business as a tailor in Hamburg.

Özkan became a German citizen when she was 18 years old. She went on to study law at the University of Hamburg and became an attorney-at-law in 1998.

== Career ==
Özkan entered politics when she joined the CDU in 2004, and was appointed State Minister of Social Affairs, Women, Family, Health, and Integration in the state of Lower Saxony. She served in the cabinets of successive Ministers-President Christian Wulff and David McAllister from 27 April 2010 to 19 February 2013.

She participated in the negotiations to form a coalition government of the Christian Democrats together with the Bavarian (CSU) and the Free Democratic Party (FDP) following the 2013 national elections. She was part of the CDU/CSU delegation in the working group on integration and migration, led by Maria Böhmer and Aydan Özoğuz. She caused some controversies in the German political establishment as she advocated a strictly secular policy and opposed the Christian cross as well as the Muslim headscarf in schools.

In a press release, Özkan announced her retirement from politics from 22 July 2014. She took a post as general manager of the DB Credit Service GmbH in Berlin, a subsidiary of Deutsche Bank, on 1 August 2014. She worked for Deutsche Telekom and the Dutch TNT Express before she entered politics. In 2018 she was announced as the CDU candidate for the mayorships elections in 2020. However, she declined to run in the elections due to a serious illness.

== Other activities ==
- German Cancer Research Center (DKFZ), member of the Advisory Council
- Haus Rissen, member of the board of trustees
- Konrad Adenauer Foundation (KAS), member of the Board of Trustees

== Personal life ==
Özkan is married to a gynaecologist. She has a son.
