= Bernd Althusmann =

German politician

Bernd Althusmann MdL MdBR
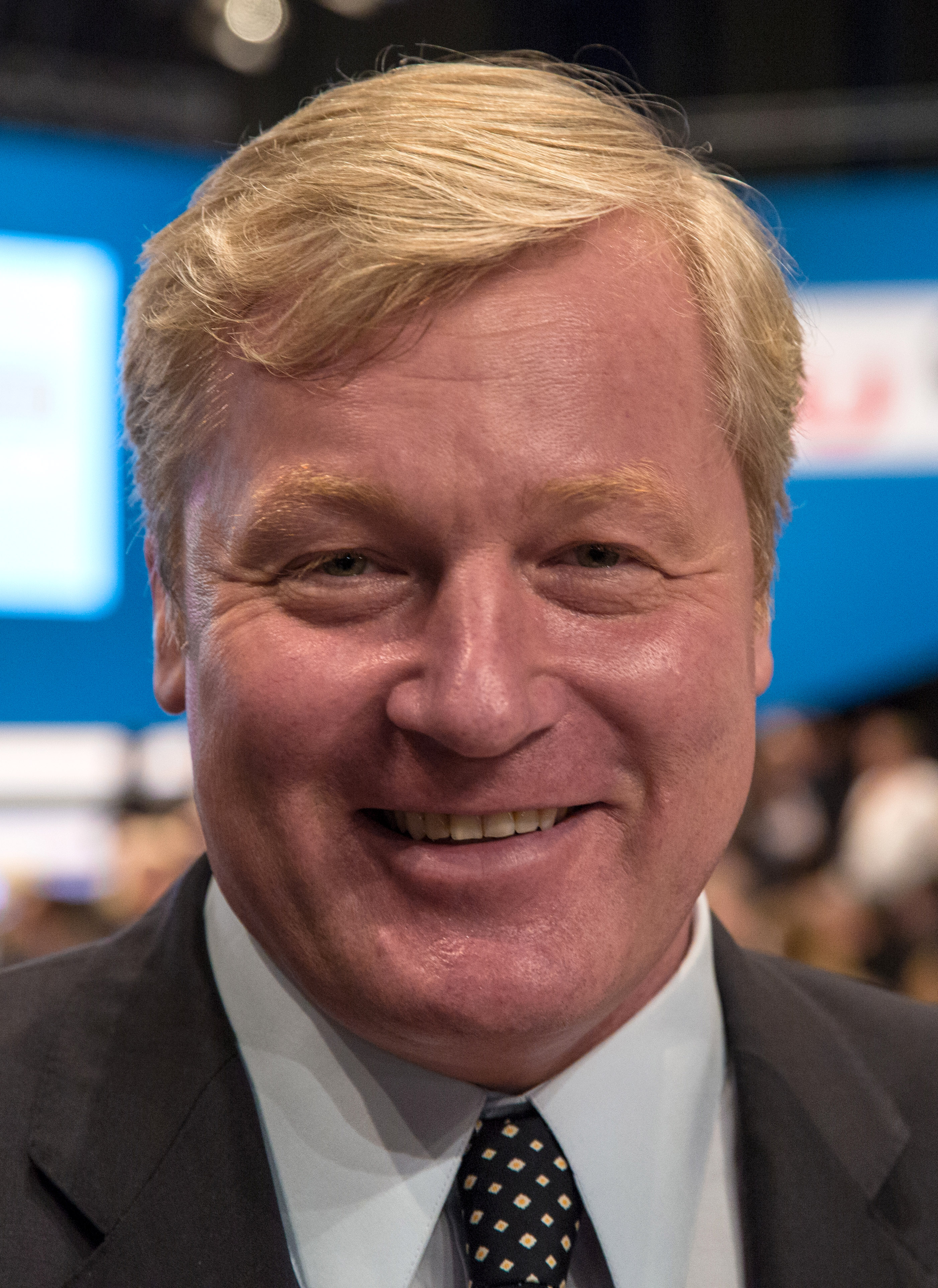
- Althusmann in 2016

Deputy Minister-President of Lower-Saxony
- In office 22 November 2017 – 8 November 2022
- Minister-President: Stephan Weil
- Preceded by: Stefan Wenzel
- Succeeded by: Julia Hamburg

Minister for Economics, Labour, Transportation and Digitization of Lower-Saxony
- In office 22 November 2017 – 8 November 2022
- Minister-President: Stephan Weil
- Preceded by: Olaf Lies (Economics, Labour and Transportation)
- Succeeded by: Olaf Lies

Leader of the Christian Democratic Union of Lower Saxony
- In office 12 November 2016 – 21 January 2023
- Deputy: Fritz Güntzler; Lena Düpont; Reinhold Hilbers
- Preceded by: David McAllister
- Succeeded by: Sebastian Lechner

Minister of Education of Lower Saxony
- In office 27 April 2010 – 19 February 2013
- Prime Minister: Christian Wulff; David McAllister
- Preceded by: Elisabeth Heister-Neumann
- Succeeded by: Frauke Heiligenstadt

Member of the Landtag of Lower Saxony for Seevetal (CDU List; 1994–2009)
- Incumbent
- Assumed office 14 November 2017
- Preceded by: Norbert Böhlke (2014)
- In office 23 June 1994 – 16 June 2009
- Succeeded by: Elisabeth Heister-Neumann

Personal details
- Born: 3 December 1966 (age 59) Oldenburg, Lower Saxony, West Germany (now Germany)
- Party: Christian Democratic Union (CDU)

Military service
- Allegiance: Germany
- Branch/service: Bundeswehr
- Years of service: 1986 - 1994
- Unit: Army (Heer) / Panzertruppe

Bernd Althusmann (German pronunciation: [ˈbɛʁnt ˈalthʊsman]; born 3 December 1966) is a German politician of the Christian Democratic Union (CDU) who served as Deputy Minister-President and State Minister for Economic Affairs in the government of Minister-President Stephan Weil from 2017 to 2022.

== Career ==
From 1994 to 2009, Althusmann was Member of the Landtag of Lower Saxony. He served as State Minister of Education in the cabinets Wulff II and McAllister from 27 April 2010 until 19 February 2013.

In July 2011 it was reported that Althusmann had taken over texts or literal texts in several places in his dissertation. The University of Potsdam has not confirmed the plagiarism allegations, despite deficiencies.

Between 2013 and 2016, Althusmann headed the Konrad Adenauer Foundation's office in Windhoek, Namibia.

Althusmann was the CDU's leading candidate for the 2017 Lower Saxon state election.

On the national level, Althusmann served as a CDU delegate to the Federal Convention for the purpose of electing the President of Germany in 2010, 2012, 2017 and 2022. In the negotiations to form a coalition government under the leadership of Chancellor Angela Merkel following the 2017 federal elections, he co-chaired the working group on urban development; his counterparts were Kurt Gribl and Natascha Kohnen. Together with Monika Grütters, Daniel Günther, Michael Kretschmer and Armin Laschet, Althusmann co-chaired the CDU's national convention in Berlin in February 2018.

Since 2022, Althusmann has been chairing – alongside Gitta Connemann – a working group charged with drafting the CDU's positions on energy policy.

== Other activities ==
=== Regulatory agencies ===
- Federal Network Agency for Electricity, Gas, Telecommunications, Post and Railway (BNetzA), Alternate Member of the Advisory Board

=== Corporate boards ===
- Volkswagen, Ex-Officio Member of the Supervisory Board (since 2017)
- Deutsche Messe AG, Ex-Officio Chairman of the Supervisory Board (since 2017)
- JadeWeserPort, Ex-Officio Chairman of the Supervisory Board (since 2017)
- Niedersachsen Ports GmbH & Co. KG (NPorts), Ex-Officio Chairman of the Supervisory Board (since 2017)

== Political positions ==
During his election campaign, Althusmann publicly favored someone from outside the auto industry to succeed VW chief executive Matthias Müller and wanted to cede one of the state's two board seats to a non-political expert. But when his party lost the 2017 state elections to the SPD, he claimed the economy minister's right to join VW's supervisory board alongside Minister-President Weil.

Ahead of the Christian Democrats' leadership election in 2021, Althusmann publicly endorsed Armin Laschet to succeed Annegret Kramp-Karrenbauer as the party's chair. For the 2021 national elections, he later also endorsed Laschet as the Christian Democrats' joint candidate to succeed Chancellor Angela Merkel.
