= Philipp Rösler =

German politician (born 1973)

Philipp Rösler GOM
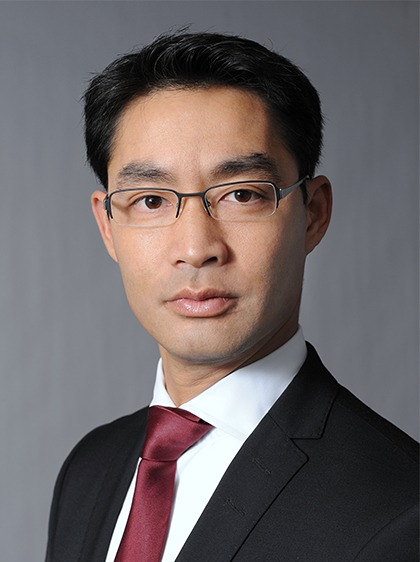
- Rösler in 2012

Vice Chancellor of Germany
- In office 16 May 2011 – 17 December 2013
- Chancellor: Angela Merkel
- Preceded by: Guido Westerwelle
- Succeeded by: Sigmar Gabriel

Honorary Consul of Vietnam to Switzerland
- Incumbent
- Assumed office 1 September 2021
- President: Nguyễn Xuân Phúc; Võ Thị Ánh Xuân (Acting); Võ Văn Thưởng
- Ambassador: Le Linh Lan
- Consulate: Zürich and Zug

Leader of the Free Democratic Party
- In office 13 May 2011 – 7 December 2013
- Preceded by: Guido Westerwelle
- Succeeded by: Christian Lindner

Minister of Economics and Technology
- In office 12 May 2011 – 17 December 2013
- Chancellor: Angela Merkel
- Preceded by: Rainer Brüderle
- Succeeded by: Sigmar Gabriel (Economics and Energy)

Minister of Health
- In office 28 October 2009 – 12 May 2011
- Chancellor: Angela Merkel
- Preceded by: Ulla Schmidt
- Succeeded by: Daniel Bahr

Leader of the Free Democratic Party in Lower Saxony
- In office 18 March 2006 – 25 September 2011
- Preceded by: Walter Hirche
- Succeeded by: Stefan Birkner

Deputy Minister-President of Lower Saxony
- In office 18 February 2008 – 27 October 2009
- Prime Minister: Christian Wulff
- Preceded by: Walter Hirche
- Succeeded by: Jörg Bode

Minister of Economics, Labour and Transport of Lower Saxony
- In office 18 February 2008 – 27 October 2009
- Prime Minister: Christian Wulff
- Preceded by: Walter Hirche
- Succeeded by: Jörg Bode

Member of the Landtag of Lower Saxony
- In office 4 March 2003 – 28 October 2009
- Preceded by: multi-member district
- Succeeded by: Gero Clemens Hocker
- Constituency: FDP list

Personal details
- Born: 24 February 1973 (age 53) Khánh Hưng, South Vietnam
- Party: Free Democratic Party
- Spouse: Wiebke Lauterbach (m. 2002)
- Children: 2
- Education: Hannover Medical School
- Website: www.philipp-roesler.de

Military service
- Allegiance: Germany
- Branch/service: Bundeswehr
- Years of service: 1992–2003
- Rank: Stabsarzt
- Unit: Joint Medical Service

Philipp Rösler GOM (German pronunciation: [ˈfɪlɪp ˈʁøːslɐ]; born 24 February 1973) is a German former politician who was federal minister of health from 2009 to 2011 and federal minister of economics and technology as well as vice-chancellor of Germany from 2011 to 2013.

Rösler was chairman of the liberal Free Democratic Party (FDP) from 2011 to 2013. Following the 2013 federal election in which the FDP left the Bundestag, he announced his resignation from the chairmanship. Born in South Vietnam, Rösler was the first cabinet minister and vice-chancellor of Asian background in Germany. Before entering politics, Rösler was a cardiothoracic surgeon.

== Early life and education ==
Rösler was born in Khánh Hung, Ba Xuyên Province, in South Vietnam (now Cần Thơ, Vietnam) on 24 February 1973. He was adopted from a Roman Catholic orphanage near Saigon by a German couple who already had two biological children, and brought him to Düsseldorf in a plane of children's rights charitable humanitarian organization Terre des Hommes at the age of nine months. He was raised by his adoptive father, who is a career military officer, after the couple separated when he was four years old.

Rösler grew up in Hamburg, Bückeburg and Hanover, where he graduated from high school in 1992. After training to become a combat medic in the German Bundeswehr (the Federal Defence Force), Rösler was accepted to study medicine at the Hanover Medical School. Following this, he continued his education at the Bundeswehr hospital in Hamburg. He earned his Doctorate in cardiothoracic surgery in 2002. He left as a Stabsarzt (a rank for German medical officers equivalent to an army captain) in 2003.

== Political career ==
=== State politics ===
Rösler joined the FDP and its political youth organization, the Young Liberals, in 1992. He was secretary of the FDP in the state of Lower Saxony from 2000 to 2004 and was chairman of the FDP parliamentary group in the Lower Saxon state assembly from 2003. From 2001 to 2006, Rösler was a member in the regional assembly of Hanover (district), where he was also deputy chairman of the parliamentary group. In May 2005, he was elected an observer of the federal FDP executive committee. He received 95% of the votes, the best result of that party conference. At the state party conference in March 2006, Rösler was elected as chairman of the Lower Saxon FDP with 96.4% of the votes; he succeeded Walter Hirche, who had decided to step down after twelve years at the helm. In April 2008, Rösler was confirmed as the Lower Saxon FDP party chairman, receiving 95% of the votes.

At the federal party conference in June 2007, Rösler was re-elected as a member of the party executive committee. The following month, he was elected to stand as his party's main candidate in the Lower Saxon state election in January 2008. In that election, he received 10.9% of the votes in his local constituency, Hanover-Döhren. On 18 February 2008, Rösler was appointed State Minister for Economic Affairs, Labour and Transport as well as Deputy Minister-President in the cabinet of Minister-President Christian Wulff of Lower Saxony.

=== Role in federal politics ===
==== Federal Minister of Health, 2009–2011 ====
Following the 2009 national elections, Rösler succeeded Ulla Schmidt as Federal Minister of Health in Angela Merkel's second cabinet.

Over the course of 2010, Rösler pushed through changes to the way drugs are priced on the German market as part of his wider-ranging health-care reform plans. In January 2011, he asked German pharmaceutical companies to refrain from delivering anesthetic sodium thiopental to the US, a request they agreed to. Later that year, he declined a request from his counterpart, United States Secretary of Commerce Gary Locke, that Germany help out with thiopental as dozens of US states were facing shortages of a drug necessary in lethal injections administered to death-row prisoners.

==== Vice-Chancellor and Federal Minister of Economics and Technology, 2011–2013 ====
Rösler succeeded Rainer Brüderle as Federal Minister of Economics and Technology on 12 May 2011 and Guido Westerwelle as Chairman of the FDP on 13 May 2011 and was also instated as Vice-Chancellor of Germany on 16 May 2011.

On 7 June 2011, Rösler attended the state dinner hosted by President Barack Obama in honor of Chancellor Angela Merkel at the White House.

Rösler strongly supported the presidential candidacy of Joachim Gauck, originally proposed by the SPD and Greens, and reportedly secured his nomination by convincing his opposing coalition partner, the CDU/CSU, to back the nomination. That was seen as a step to demonstrate the independence of his party which was dramatically trailing in polls.

As a consequence of the FDP's defeat in the 2013 state elections in Lower Saxony, Rösler offered to step down as party chairman. The leadership decided that he would remain but not lead the party in the federal elections, instead acting in a team with Rainer Brüderle as top candidate. Following the defeat of 2013 federal elections, when the FDP was for first time in its history voted out of the Bundestag, he stepped down as chairman and retired from politics. Christian Lindner became his successor as leader of the FDP.

== Life after politics ==
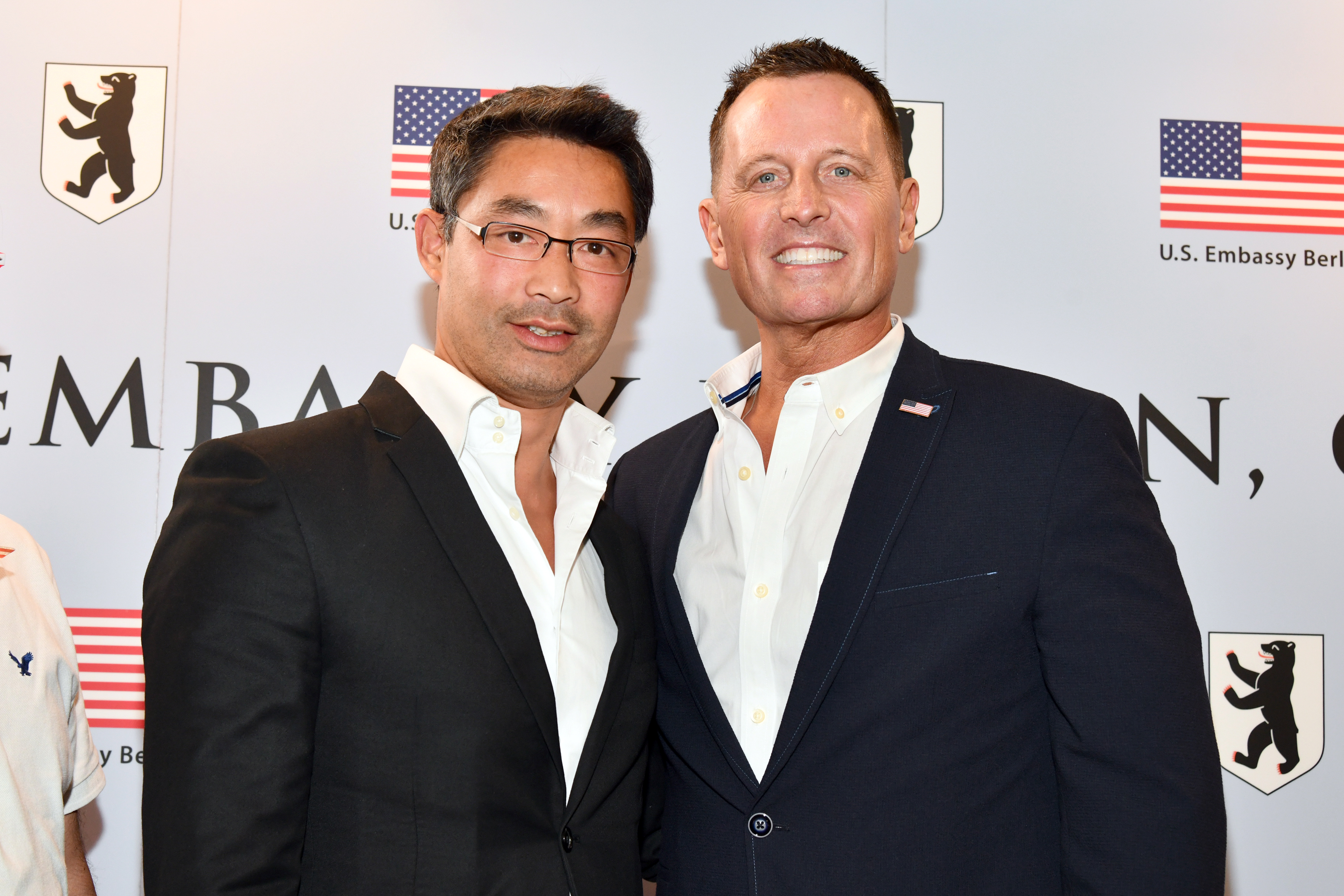
Rösler with Richard Grenell in 2019

In January 2014, Rösler became a member of the managing board and Head of the Centre for Regional Strategies of the World Economic Forum (WEF) in Switzerland, under the leadership of chairman Klaus Schwab. From late 2017 until early 2019, Rösler was chief executive officer of New York-based Hainan Cihang Charity Foundation Inc., the largest shareholder of HNA Group.

In 2020, Rösler founded Consessor AG, a consulting firm based in Zug which advises companies on strategic management and internationalization.

In September 2021, Rösler was appointed as the Honorary Consul of Vietnam to the Swiss cantons of Zürich and Zug.

== Other activities ==
=== Corporate boards ===
- CV VC, Member of the Board of Directors (since 2023)
- VinaCapital Ventures, chairman of the advisory board (since 2021)
- Brainloop, Member of the supervisory board (since 2020)
- Pure Holding, member of the board of directors (since 2020)
- Arabesque S-Ray, Partner (since 2019)
- Numbrs, Member of the advisory board (since 2019)
- Emmacc, Member of the advisory board (since 2019)
- Loc Troi Group (LT Group), Independent member of the board of directors
- Long Anh Province Energy Company, Independent member of the board of directors
- Fortum, Member of the supervisory board (2019–2023)
- Siemens Healthineers, Member of the supervisory board (2018–2023)
- KfW, Ex-Officio Member of the supervisory board (2011–2013)
- Volkswagen, ex-officio Member of the supervisory board (2009)

=== Non-profit organizations ===
- World Vision Germany, Member of the Board of Trustees (since 2020)
- Constructor University, Member of the Board of Governors (since 2018)
- Bertelsmann Stiftung, Member of the Board of Trustees (2017–2022)
- Bertelsmann Foundation North America, Member of the Board of Directors
- Green Helmets, Member of the Board of Trustees
- Robert Enke Foundation, chairman of the Board of Trustees (2010–14)
- ZDF, Member of the Television Board (2012–13)

== Personal life ==
Rösler is a Roman Catholic, and a member of the General Conference of the Central Committee of German Catholics (ZdK). He has been married to Wiebke Lauterbach, also a physician, since 2002. The couple has twin daughters. The family lived in Isernhagen before moving to Geneva in 2014 and, in 2017, to Zürich.

== Honours ==
- Grand Officer of the Order of Merit, Portugal (3 March 2009)
- Conferred an Honorary Doctoral Degree in International Relations from The University of Cambodia in 2015

Party political offices
Preceded by Guido Westerwelle	Leader of the Free Democratic Party; 2011–2013	Succeeded by Christian Lindner
Political offices
Preceded by Walter Hirche	Minister for Economics, Labour and Transport of Lower Saxony; 2009	Succeeded by Jörg Bode
Preceded by Ulla Schmidt	Minister of Health; 2009–2011	Succeeded by Daniel Bahr
Preceded by Guido Westerwelle	Vice-Chancellor of Germany; 2011–2013	Succeeded by Sigmar Gabriel
Preceded by Rainer Brüderle	Minister of Economics and Technology; 2011–2013	Succeeded by Sigmar Gabriel
