= Björn Försterling =

German politician (born 1982)

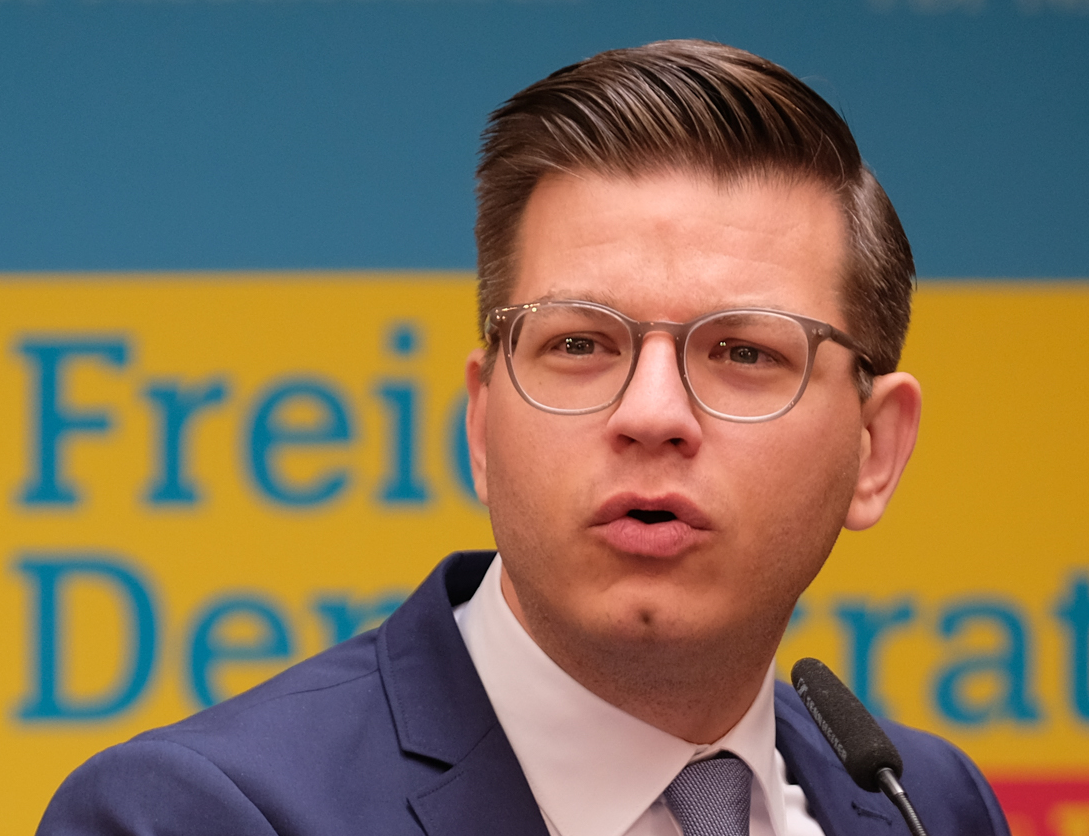
Björn Försterling (2017).

Björn Försterling (born 23 July 1982 in Wolfenbüttel) is a German politician of the Free Democratic Party (FDP) who served as a member of the State Parliament of Lower Saxony from 2008 to 2022.

In the negotiations to form a so-called traffic light coalition of the Social Democratic Party (SPD), the Green Party and the FDP following the 2021 German elections, Försterling was part of his party's delegation in the working group on education policy, co-chaired by Andreas Stoch, Felix Banaszak and Jens Brandenburg.
