= Brigitte Somfleth =

German politician (born 1953)

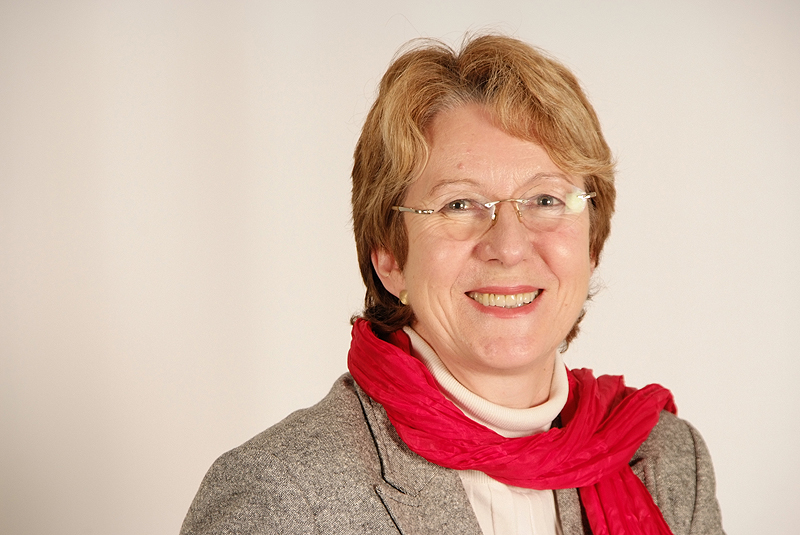
- Brigitte Somfleth in November 2009

Member of the Landtag of Lower Saxony
- In office 1994–2013

Personal details
- Born: 22 March 1953 (age 73) Hitzacker, Germany
- Party: Social Democratic Party of Germany

Brigitte Somfleth (born 22 March 1953) is a German politician from the Social Democratic Party. From 1994 to 2013 she was a member of the Landtag of Lower Saxony.

She is married and has two children. The former mayor of Seevetal, Günter Schwarz, is her brother.

== Education and early career ==
After graduating from high school, Somfleth studied to become a primary and secondary school teacher in Hamburg. In 1978/79, she worked as a stewardess on merchant ships in the high seas. She then worked at a primary school in Hamburg until 1980. From 1990, she worked in the constituency office of Member of Parliament Ingomar Hauchler.

== Political career ==
Somfleth has been a member of the SPD (Social Democratic Party of Germany) since 1985. She is a member of the executive committee of the Hanover district. Since 1986, she has been a member of the local council and deputy mayor of Meckelfeld/Klein Moor. In 2005, she was elected mayor, a position she held until 2021. From 1987 to 1991 and again since 2001, she has served as a councilwoman for the municipality of Seevetal. She also served as a district councilor in the Harburg district from 1991 to 2000. From 1994 to 2013, Somfleth was a member of the Landtag of Lower Saxony; since 2003, she has served there as secretary. In addition to her party membership, she is a member of the Education and Science Workers' Union, the Workers' Welfare Association, and the Friends of Nature.

== See also ==
- List of members of the Lower Saxon Landtag 2003–2008
- List of members of the Lower Saxon Landtag 2008–2013
