= Toleranzpreis der Evangelischen Akademie Tutzing =

The Toleranzpreis der Evangelischen Akademie Tutzing (Prize for tolerance) is a prize that has been awarded biennially by the Evangelische Akademie Tutzing to personalities who have been influential towards a dialogue between cultures and religions. From 2012, an additional prize has been given to support moral courage (Preis zur Förderung der Zivilcourage).

== Recipients ==
The prize was given to:

- 2000 Roman Herzog
- 2002 Daniel Barenboim
- 2004 Henning Mankell
- 2006 Aga Khan IV
- 2008 Shirin Ebadi
- 2010 Wolfgang Schäuble
- 2012 Peter Maffay; category Zivilcourage: Bayerisches Bündnis für Toleranz
- 2014 Christian Wulff; category Zivilcourage: Constanze Kurz
- 2016 Frank-Walter Steinmeier, Christian Springer
- 2018 Emmanuel Macron; category Zivilcourage
- 2020 Dunja Hayali; category Zivilcourage
- 2022 Christian Stückl
