= Lena Düpont =

German politician of the Christian Democratic Union (born 1986)

Lena Düpont MEP
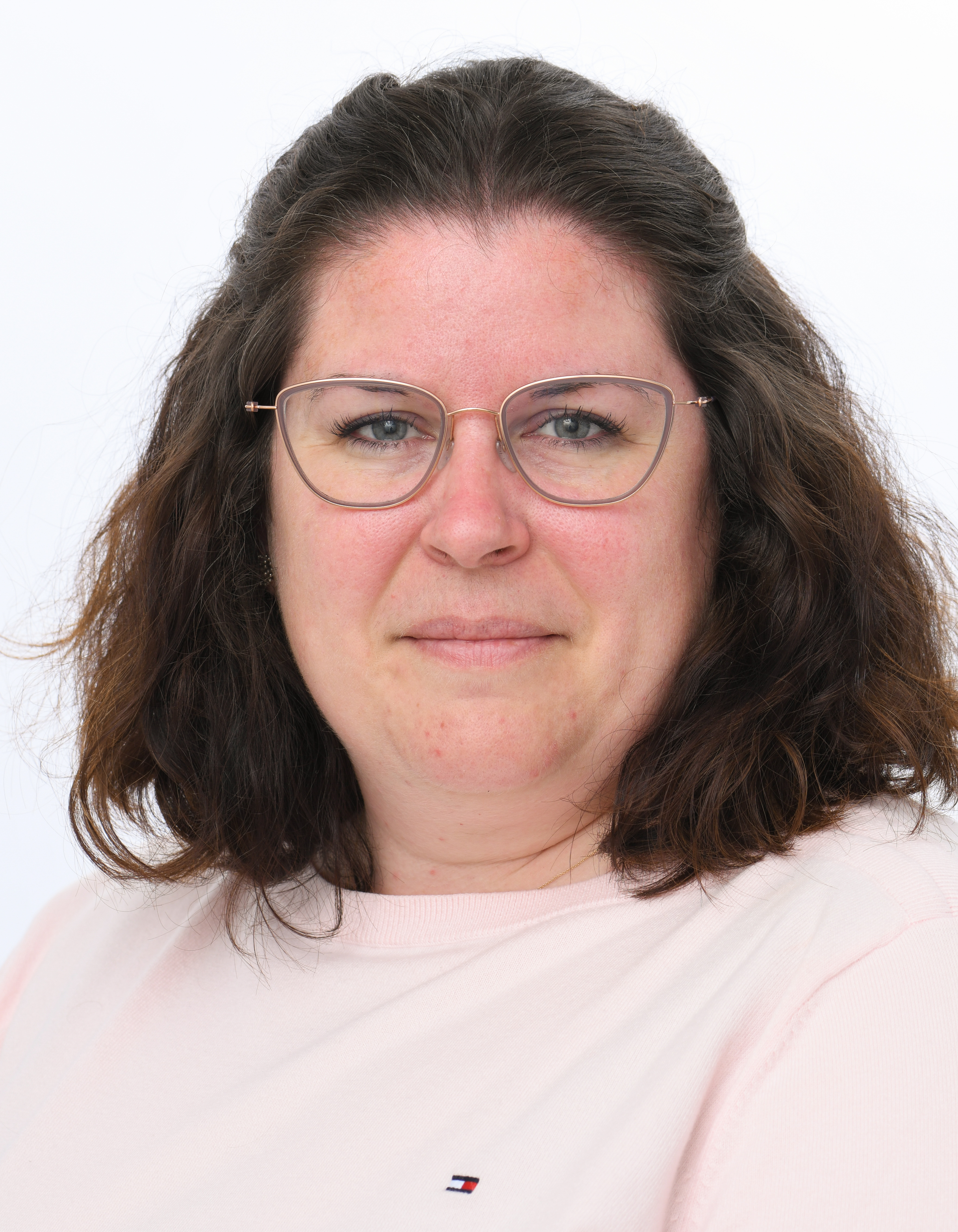
- Düpont in 2024

Member of the European Parliament for Germany

Personal details
- Born: 30 April 1986 (age 40) Dortmund, West Germany
- Party: German: Christian Democratic Union; EU: European People's Party
- Education: University of Erlangen–Nuremberg

Lena Düpont (born 30 April 1986) is a German politician of the Christian Democratic Union who has been serving as a Member of the European Parliament for Germany since 2019.

== Education and early career ==
Düpont was born in Dortmund and grew up in the Gifhorn district. In 2005 she finished the Humboldt Gymnasium, after which she studied political science and journalism at the University of Erlangen–Nuremberg. As a legislative advisor, she worked, among others, for the CDU politicians Renate Sommer in Brussels and Ewa Klamt, Eckhard Pols and Ingrid Pahlmann in Berlin.

== Member of the European Parliament ==
Düpont has been a Member of the European Parliament since the 2019 European elections. She has since been serving on the Committee on Civil Liberties, Justice and Home Affairs. In this capacity, she had been the parliament's rapporteur on a 2020 law establishing a common border procedure for international protection. In 2021, she also joined the parliament's working group on Frontex, led by Roberta Metsola. In addition to her committee assignments, Düpont was part of the Parliament's delegation to the EU-Montenegro Stabilisation and Association Parliamentary Committee.

Since 2021, Düpont has been serving as deputy chairwoman of the CDU in Lower Saxony, under the leadership of chairman Bernd Althusmann. She was nominated by her party as delegate to the Federal Convention for the purpose of electing the President of Germany in 2022.

She was reelected as a Member of the European Parliament in 2024, where she currently serves as a member of the Committee on Civil Liberties, Justice and Home Affairs and substitute on the Committee on Agriculture and Rural Development.

== Other activities ==
- Quadriga Hochschule Berlin, Member of the Advisory Board on Politics and Public Affairs
