= Christel Wegner =

German politician (1947–2023)

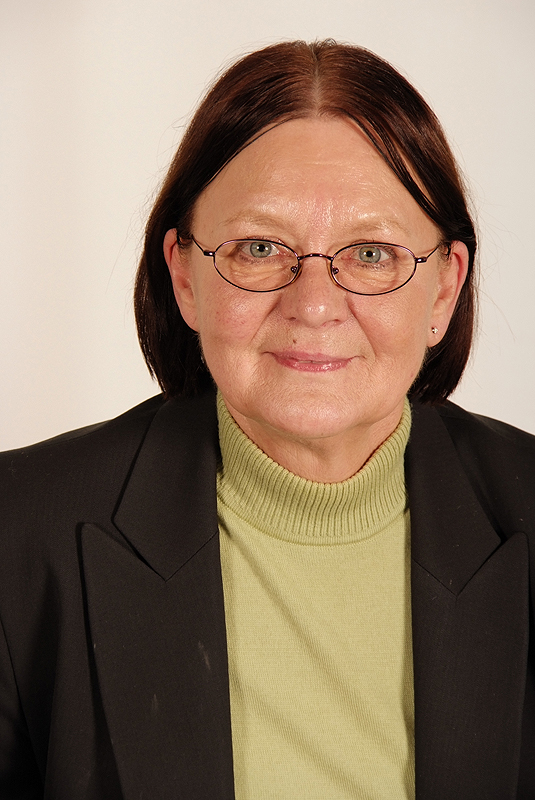
- Wegner in 2009

Member of the Landtag of Lower Saxony
- In office 26 February 2008 – 2013

Personal details
- Born: 16 November 1947 Hamburg, Allied-occupied Germany
- Died: 11 February 2023 (aged 75) Spain
- Party: DKP
- Other political affiliations: Marxistische Linke (from 2014)

Christel Wegner (16 November 1947 – 11 February 2023) was a German communist politician. In 2008, she was elected to the Parliament of Lower Saxony for Die Linke, although she was a member of the German Communist Party (DKP), which has cooperated closely with that party. Shortly after her election, she gained widespread attention when it was claimed by a TV program that she had called for the return of the Stasi and justified the construction of the Berlin Wall, also voicing her support for Margot Honecker. Die Linke distanced itself from her, and on 18 February 2008 she was expelled from the party's parliamentary group.

== Controversial statements ==
Wegner gained widespread attention after she made controversial statements during a television interview in February 2008 with the NDR. She said "I believe that, when one creates another kind of society, one will need such a structure again, because one has to protect oneself against other forces, reactionary forces who use the opportunity and weaken such a state from the inside." The program suggested that "such a structure" referred to the GDR Secret Police organisation the Stasi.

In reply, in a personal statement, Wegner declared: "What I really said was that every state has a secret service and that this is of course also the case for a socialist state" and that she did not in fact "want the Stasi back".

The DKP politician also declared that a reason for the construction of the Berlin Wall was to keep West Germans out of the GDR, "both to prevent them from hurting the economy by buying goods cheaply and also to keep out forces one didn't want there." Also, she stated her "unconditional support" for those who "spent their entire lives building up another kind of society" and that she supported Margot Honecker "idealistically and materially".

In her statement she declared that "It really is clear that I'm not out to restart the Stasi, to rebuild the Berlin Wall or to take away the homes of the citizens of Lower Saxony", claiming that there were many cuts in the report and that "The goal of the campaign clearly is to hit Die Linke, and of course also me as a Communist."

The TV program upheld its earlier claims that she was indeed making references to the Stasi and that during the interview she made repetitive claims stating that the Stasi was "legitimate for the GDR".

== Expulsion from The Left parliamentary group ==
On 18 February 2008, the Die Linke Lower Saxony parliamentary group issued a statement saying that she had been expelled from their parliamentary group and urged her to give up her seat in the assembly.

== Die Linke and the German Communist Party ==
The controversy led to calls from central figures in Die Linke to end any cooperation with the German Communist Party. At the time both Die Linke and the DKP were under surveillance by the Bundesamt für Verfassungsschutz due to alleged leftwing extremist tendencies.

== Political affiliations ==
Wegner was a member of the German Communist Party (DKP), the Union of Persecutees of the Nazi Regime (VVN-BdA), the labor union Ver.di and a paying/passive member of Greenpeace.
