= Hartmut Möllring =

German politician

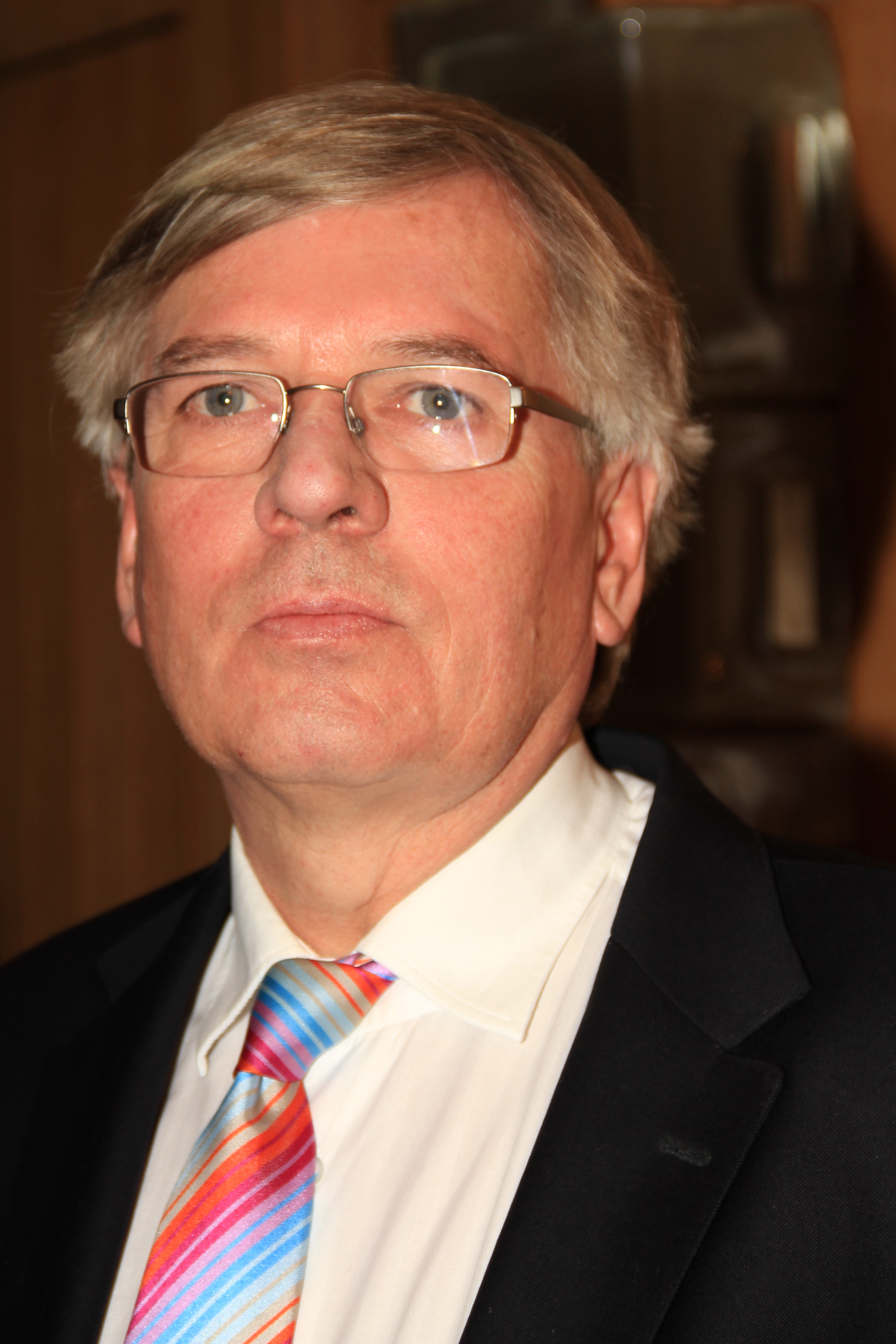
- Möllring in 2013

Minister of Finance Lower Saxony
- In office 4 March 2003 – 19 February 2013
- President: Christian Wulff; David McAllister
- Preceded by: Heinrich Go
- Succeeded by: Peter-Jürgen Schneider

Minister of Science and Economy Saxony-Anhalt
- In office 22 April 2013 – 25 April 2016
- President: Reiner Haseloff
- Preceded by: Birgitta Wolff
- Succeeded by: Jörg Felgner

Personal details
- Born: 31 December 1951 (age 74) Groß Ilsede
- Party: Christian Democratic Union of Germany
- Education: Scharnhorstgymnasium Hildesheim
- Occupation: Judge politician jurist

Hartmut Möllring (born 31 December 1951, Groß Ilsede) is a German politician of the Christian Democratic Union of Germany (CDU). From 1990 to 2013 he was a member of the Landtag of Lower Saxony. From 2003 to 2013, he was the Minister of Finance for the Lower Saxony. He was also chairman of the TdL and a memberof the Supervisory Board of Salzgitter AG
