= Jörg Bode (politician) =

German politician (born 1970)

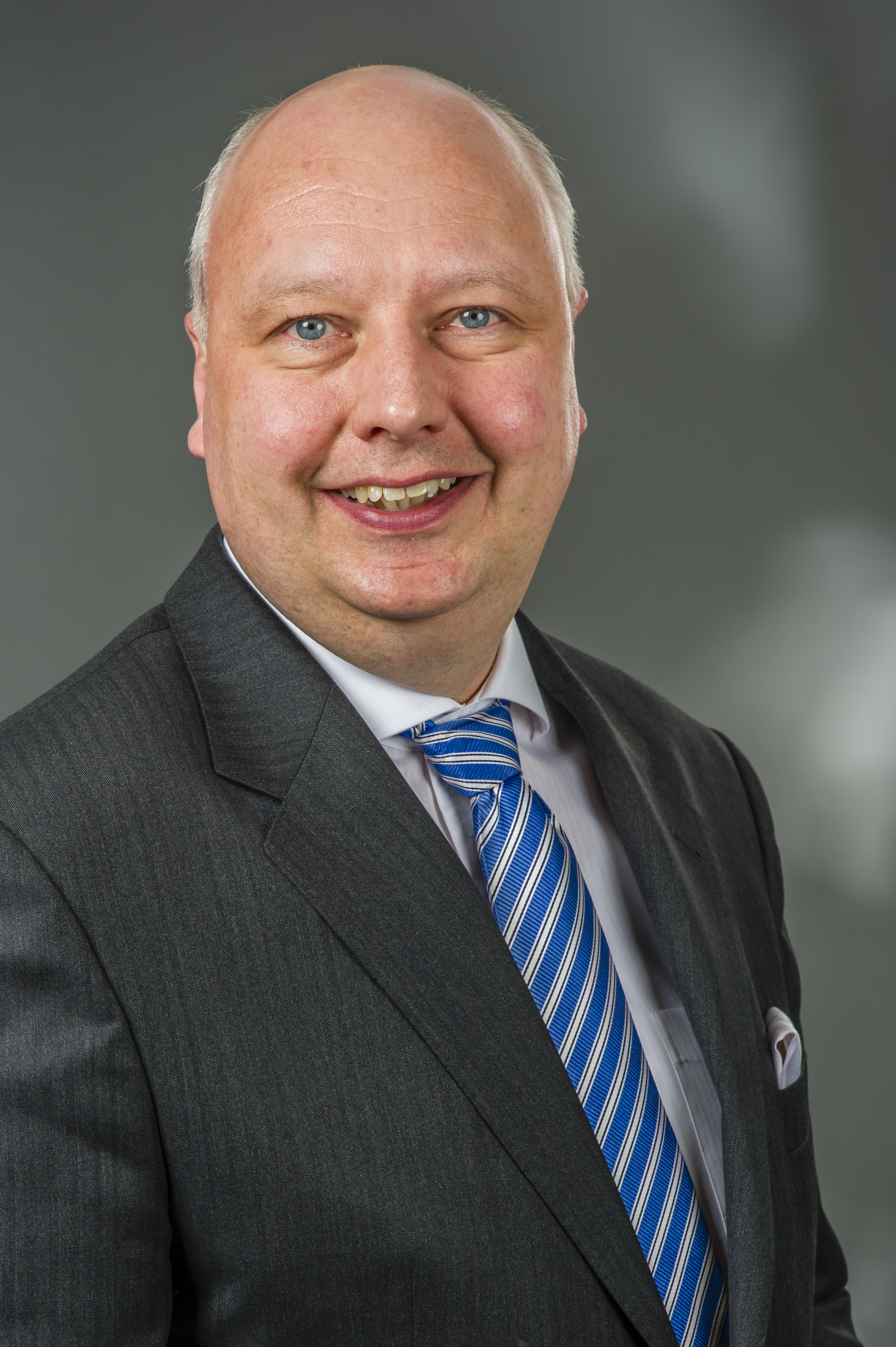
- Jörg Bode

Minister-President of Lower Saxony Acting
- In office 30 June 2010 – 1 July 2010
- Deputy: himself
- Preceded by: Christian Wulff
- Succeeded by: David McAllister

Deputy Minister-President of Lower Saxony
- In office 28 October 2009 – 19 February 2013
- Minister-President: Christian Wulff; David McAllister
- Preceded by: Philipp Rösler
- Succeeded by: Stefan Wenzel

Minister of Economics, Labour and Transport of Lower Saxony
- In office 28 October 2009 – 19 February 2013
- Minister-President: Christian Wulff
- Preceded by: Christian Wulff
- Succeeded by: Olaf Lies

Member of the Landtag of Lower Saxony
- Incumbent
- Assumed office 4 March 2003
- Constituency: FDP List

Personal details
- Born: 12 November 1970 (age 55) Celle, Germany
- Party: FDP

Jörg Bode (born 12 November 1970) is a German politician of the Free Democratic Party (FDP), formerly serving as the Minister for Economics, Labour and Transport and Deputy Prime Minister of the state of Lower Saxony.

He was elected to the Landtag of Lower Saxony in 2003, and has been re-elected on one occasion. On 28 October 2009, Bode succeeded Philipp Rösler as the Minister for Economics, Labour and Transport and Deputy Prime Minister of the State of Lower Saxony. He served as Acting Prime Minister from 30 June until 1 July, following the resignation of Christian Wulff, who was elected President of Germany.
