= Hans-Heinrich Sander =

German politician (1945–2017)

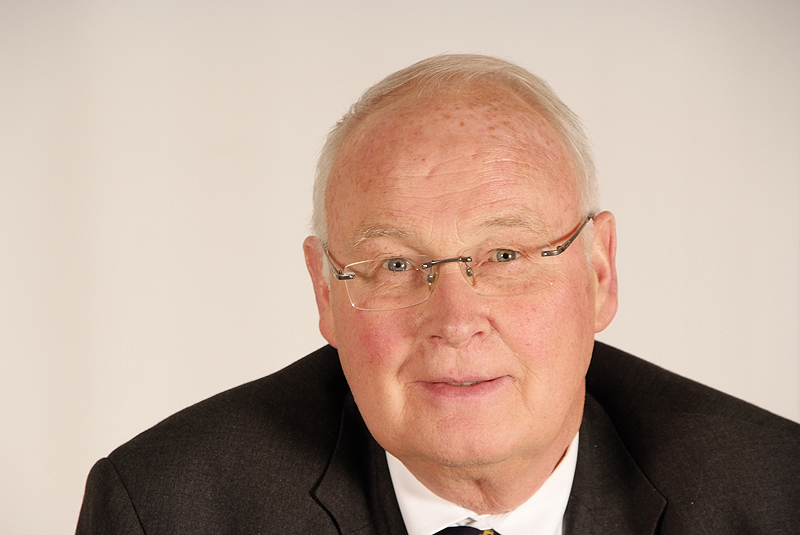
Sander in 2009

Hans-Heinrich Sander (12 April 1945 – 22 April 2017) was a German politician for the Free Democratic Party (German: Freie Demokratische Partei/FDP).

He was elected to the Lower Saxon Landtag in 2003, and has been re-elected on one occasion. He has served as the Lower-Saxon Minister of Environment in the first cabinet Wulff and served as the Lower-Saxon Minister of Environment and Climate Protection in the second cabinet Wulff/McAllister.

== Family and personal life ==
Born in Golmbach, Hans-Heinrich Sander was the son of former agriculturist and politician Heinrich Sander. He began his joblife as agriculturist but went on studying teaching after suffering a heavy work accident in which he lost his left arm. After receiving a teaching degree by the PH Göttingen in 1973 he became a teacher and later the headmaster of the elementary school in Bevern where he stayed until 2002. Also, he was an agriculturist like his father. Sander was married and had two children. He was still running a fruit company in his hometown Golmbach.

Sander was married and had two children. His daughter is also involved in German local politics in Berlin.

Sander died on 22 April 2017, aged 72.

== Party ==
Sander became a member of the Free Democratic Party in 1968. He was deputy chairman of the Lower-Saxon Free Democratic Party and district chairman of the Free Democratic Party Holzminden. He has been the mayor of the Samtgemeinde Bevern from 2001 to 2003.

== Politics ==
In 1973 Sander became a member of the county council of Holzminden which he stayed until 2006. He was a member of the Lower-Saxon parliament from 2003 and the Lower-Saxon Minister of Environment and Climate Protection from 4 March 2003. From 1996, Hans-Heinrich Sander was Deputy District Administrator of Holzminden.
