= David McAllister =

German politician (born 1971)

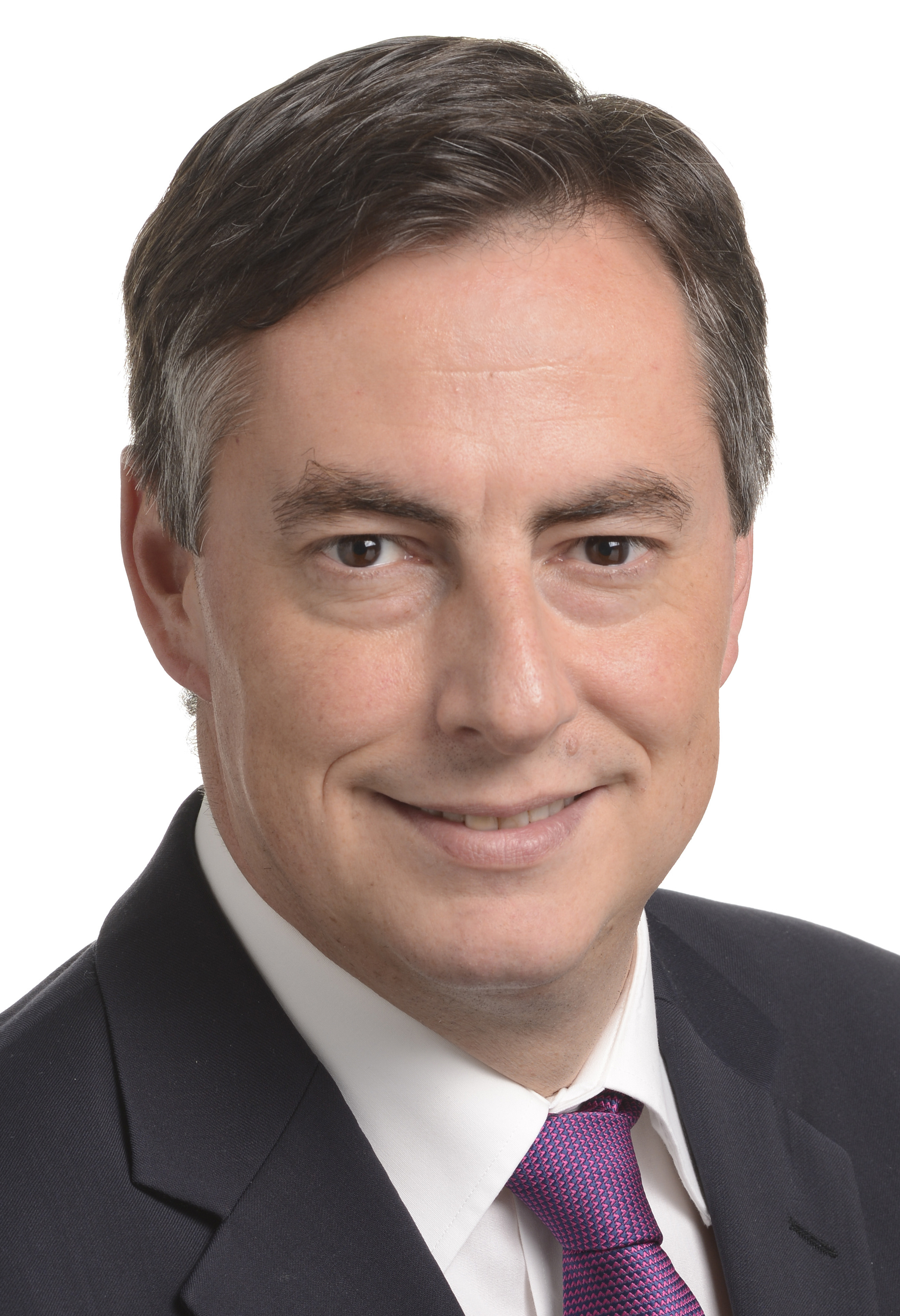

Chair of the European Parliament Foreign Affairs Committee
- Incumbent
- Assumed office 1 February 2017
- Preceded by: Elmar Brok

Member of the European Parliament
- Incumbent
- Assumed office 1 July 2014
- Constituency: Germany

Vice President of the European People's Party
- Incumbent
- Assumed office 3 October 2015
- President: Joseph Daul; Donald Tusk
- Preceded by: Michel Barnier

Minister-President of Lower Saxony
- In office 1 July 2010 – 19 February 2013
- Deputy: Jörg Bode
- Preceded by: Christian Wulff
- Succeeded by: Stephan Weil

Chairman of the Christian Democratic Union of Lower Saxony
- In office 19 June 2008 – 12 November 2016
- Preceded by: Christian Wulff
- Succeeded by: Bernd Althusmann

Leader of the Christian Democratic Union in the Landtag of Lower Saxony
- In office 4 February 2003 – 1 July 2010
- Preceded by: Christian Wulff
- Succeeded by: Björn Thümler

Member of the Landtag of Lower Saxony for Hadeln/Wesermünde (Hadeln; 2003–2008) (CDU List; 1998–2003)
- In office 30 March 1998 – 26 March 2014
- Preceded by: Birgit Meyn-Horeis
- Succeeded by: Aygül Özkan

Personal details
- Born: David James McAllister; 12 January 1971 (age 55) West Berlin, West Germany
- Citizenship: Germany; United Kingdom
- Party: German: Christian Democratic Union; EU: European People's Party
- Spouse: Dunja Kolleck
- Children: 2
- Education: Leibniz University Hannover
- Website: david-mcallister.de

Military service
- Allegiance: Germany
- Branch/service: Bundeswehr
- Years of service: 1989–1991
- Unit: Army (Heer) / Panzerbataillon 74

David James McAllister (born 12 January 1971) is a German politician who has been a member of the European Parliament since 2014. He is a member of the Christian Democratic Union (CDU), part of the European People's Party. He is the current vice president of the European People's Party and he is also vice chairman of the International Democracy Union. He was appointed Chair of the European Parliament Foreign Affairs Committee in February 2017.

On 1 July 2010 McAllister was elected Minister-President of the state of Lower Saxony, succeeding Christian Wulff, who resigned following his election as President of Germany. Until his election defeat on 19 February 2013, he headed a coalition government with the liberal FDP, the Cabinet McAllister. In the 2014 European elections, McAllister was elected a Member of the European Parliament as the CDU's top candidate in Lower Saxony.

A lawyer by profession, he served as chairman of the CDU parliamentary group in the Lower Saxon Parliament from 2003 to 2010 and was elected chairman of the state party in 2008. In November 2016 he left the chairman post, and announced that he sees his political future in Europe. McAllister holds both German and British citizenship.

Following his election as Minister-President, he was described as a rising star in the CDU and, at the time, as a potential successor to Angela Merkel. He has more recently been mentioned as a possible future European Commissioner, however this became impossible when his countrywoman, Ursula von der Leyen, was elected President of the European Commission in 2019 and 2024.

== Early life ==
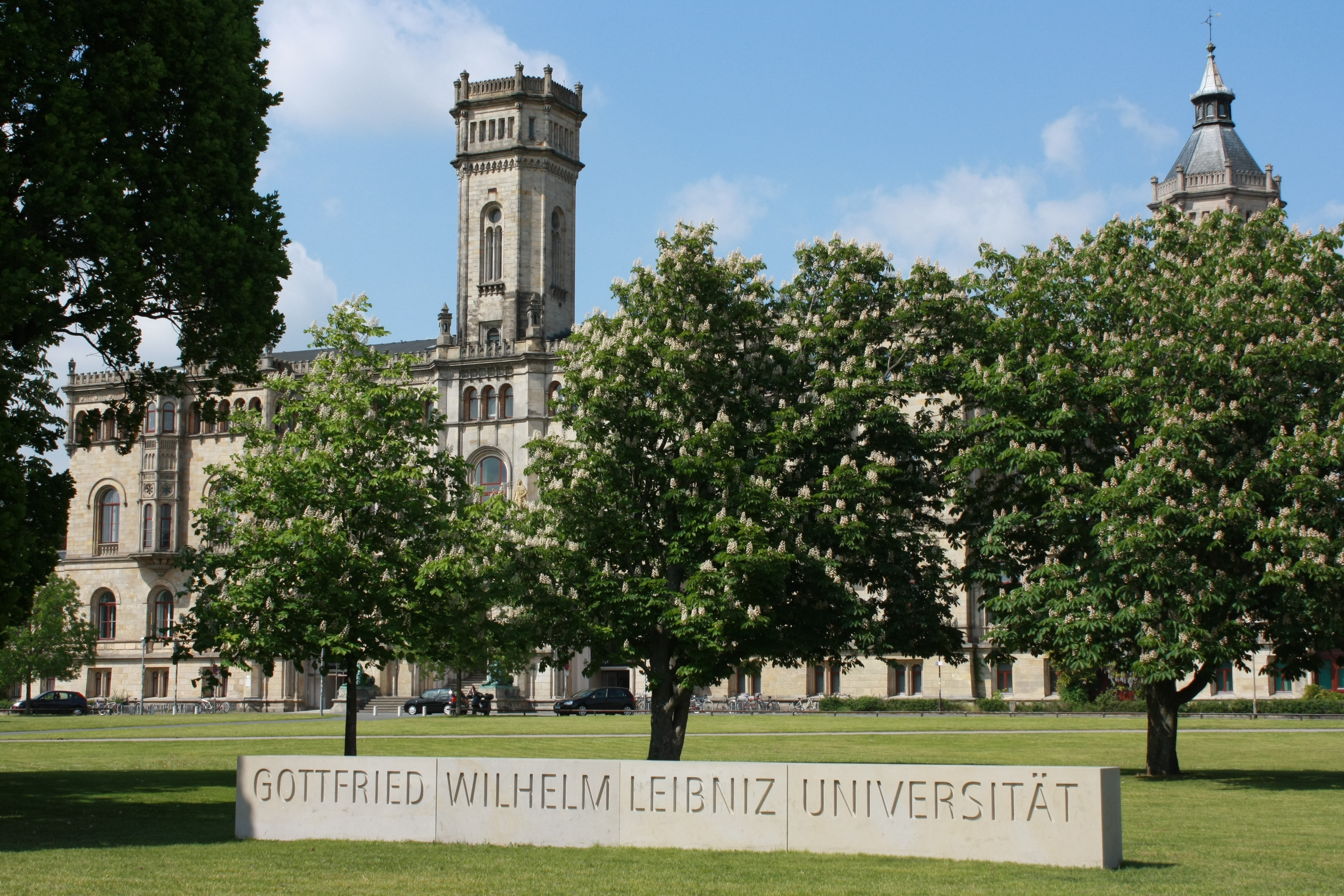
Leibniz University Hannover, where McAllister read Law

McAllister was born in West Berlin on 12 January 1971 to a Scottish father and a German mother. His father, James Buchanan McAllister, who was originally from Glasgow (where the family still has relatives), was a British civil servant. From 1969, James McAllister worked in West Berlin, while attached to the British Army's Royal Corps of Signals.

His mother, Mechthild McAllister, is a music teacher.

He was raised bilingually and attended a British primary school in Berlin.

In a 2010 interview he linked his family's name to Clan MacAlister.

After his parents moved to the small town of Bad Bederkesa in Lower Saxony in 1982, he went to the Lower Saxony Internatsgymnasium (boarding school) in Bederkesa, where he took his Abitur in 1989. From 1989-91, McAllister served his military service in the Bundeswehr, in Panzerbataillon 74 in Cuxhaven. From 1991–96 he read Law with a scholarship from the Konrad Adenauer Foundation at the Leibniz University Hannover. In 1994, McAllister became local chairman of the CDU youth organisation, Junge Union, in the Cuxhaven district.

McAllister holds both German and UK citizenship and fluently speaks both German and English, although he has stated that he's "more or less completely German. I've lived in Germany all my life. I did all my school in Germany and my military service in Germany." His upbringing in West Berlin, however, he describes as "very British" with "British network, British schools". Holding dual citizenship, he could have relinquished his German citizenship to avoid compulsory military service in Germany (the UK abolished their National Service in 1960), but opted to serve instead.

McAllister has said that "my upbringing in West Berlin may have had an impact on my resentment towards Communists. I became a member of the CDU when I was 17 – it was a birthday present. My parents said, 'What do you want for your birthday?’ I said I wanted to become a member of the CDU", explaining that his father was a conservative, although neither of his parents were involved in party politics.

== Political career ==
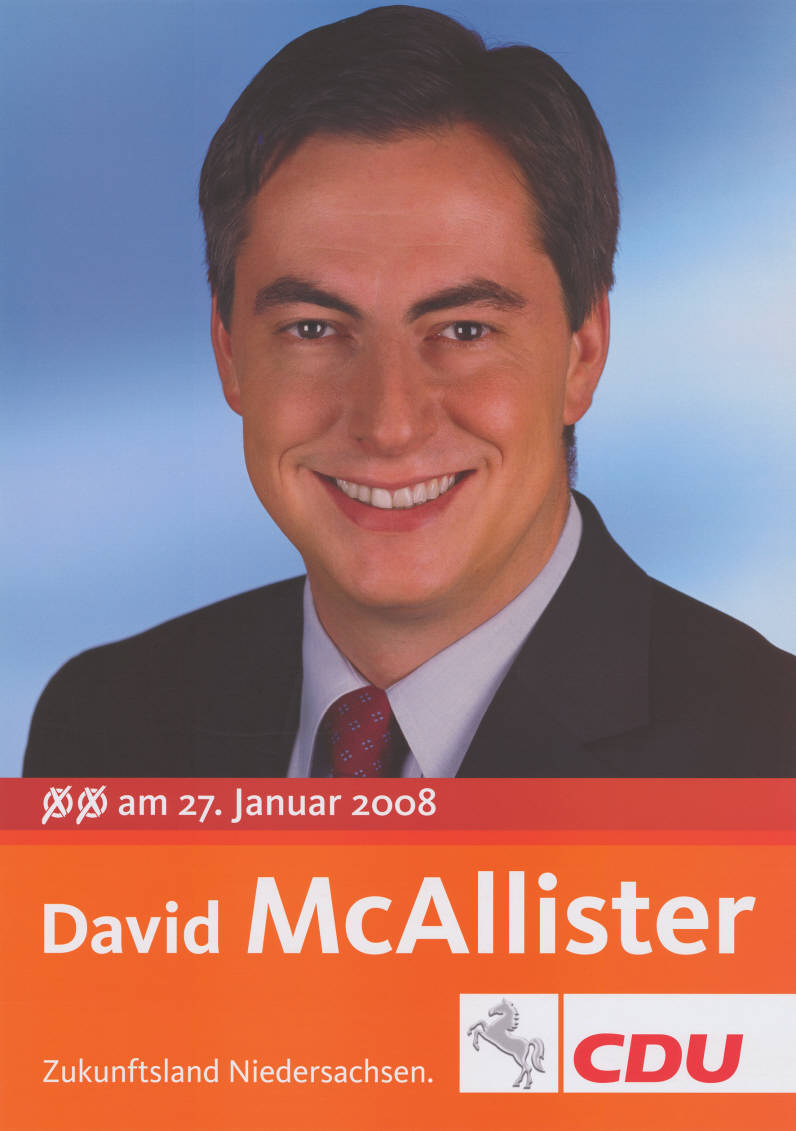
McAllister in an electoral poster for the 2008 Lower Saxony state election

From 1996 till 2010, McAllister was a member of the Cuxhaven district council (Kreistag). He served as mayor of his hometown of Bad Bederkesa from 2001 to 2002. From 2002 to 2003, he also was secretary general of the CDU in Lower Saxony. Since 2003, McAllister has served as the leader of the CDU parliamentary party group in the Parliament of Lower Saxony, of which he has been a member since 1998. McAllister succeeded Christian Wulff as party chairman of the CDU in Lower Saxony from June 2008 until November 2016. He was succeeded by Bernd Althusmann. In the United Kingdom, McAllister is a supporter of the Conservative Party.

In 2005, Chancellor Angela Merkel offered him the position of Secretary General of the CDU, but McAllister declined, arguing he did not want to rise too far too fast. He was a CDU delegate to the Federal Convention for the purpose of electing the President of Germany in 2004, 2009, 2010 and 2012.

=== Minister-President of Lower Saxony, 2010–2013 ===
On 4 June 2010, McAllister was designated by his party to succeed Christian Wulff as Minister-President of Lower Saxony, if the latter were to be elected President of Germany on 30 June. After the election of Wulff as president, David McAllister was elected the new Minister-President of Lower Saxony the following day. He was subsequently appointed to the supervisory board of Volkswagen, the largest company in Lower Saxony and of which the state of Lower Saxony is a major stockholder, and served in this capacity until 2013.

In December 2012, McAllister presided over the CDU’s national convention in Hanover.

Following the 2013 Lower Saxony state election, McAllister's CDU-FDP Coalition lost control of the Landtag, which meant that the Christian Democrats and the Free Democrats eventually lost the government role. On 19 February 2013, Stephan Weil of the Social Democratic Party of Germany (SPD) was elected Minister-President of Lower Saxony with the votes of SPD and Alliance '90/The Greens. McAllister resigned from the Landtag in March 2014 to prepare for the European parliament election, where he was the lead candidate for the CDU/CSU.

Following the 2013 German elections, McAllister was part of the CDU/CSU team in the negotiations with the SPD on a coalition agreement.

=== Member of the European Parliament, 2014–present ===
As a Member of the European Parliament, McAllister serves as chairman of the Delegation for Relations with the United States and as member of the Committee on Foreign Affairs. In this capacity, he is the parliament's rapporteur on Serbia. In addition, he is a member of the European Parliament Intergroup on SMEs.

He became vice chairman of the International Democrat Union in 2014. In October 2015 he was elected vice president of the European People's Party. In this capacity, he co-chairs (alongside Joseph Daul), the EPP's Working Group on European Policy.

Since 2017, McAllister has been serving as chairman of the Committee on Foreign Affairs, following Elmar Brok. In this capacity, he also co-chairs – first alongside Linda McAvan (2017-2019), later Tomas Tobé (since 2019) – the Democracy Support and Election Coordination Group (DEG), which oversees the Parliament's election observation missions. Within his own political group, he has been co-chairing the EPP Foreign Affairs Ministers Meeting since 2017, alongside Simon Coveney.

In the negotiations to form a coalition government following the 2017 federal elections, McAllister was part of the CDU/CSU delegation in the working group on European policy, led by Peter Altmaier, Alexander Dobrindt and Achim Post.

Following the 2019 elections, McAllister was part of a cross-party working group in charge of drafting the European Parliament's four-year work program on foreign policy.

== Other activities ==
=== Corporate boards ===
- Matthai Verwaltungs-GmbH
- Volkswagen, ex-officio Member of the Supervisory Board (2010–2013)

=== Non-profit organizations ===
- Friends of Europe, Member of the Board of Trustees (since 2020)
- German Council on Foreign Relations (DGAP), Member of the Presidium (since 2019)
- European Council on Foreign Relations (ECFR), Member
- European Leadership Network (ELN), Member
- European Youth Parliament – Germany, Member of the Board of Trustees
- Konrad Adenauer Foundation, Member

== Political positions ==
Following Brexit, McAllister joined Manfred Weber, Esteban González Pons and Sandra Kalniete in co-signing a letter to President of the European Parliament David Sassoli to establish an EU-UK Joint Parliamentary Assembly. In 2021, he joined forces with Terry Reintke and Radosław Sikorski in initiating a letter of 145 member of the European Parliament to Commission President Ursula von der Leyen and Education Commissioner Mariya Gabriel in which they called for allowing Scotland and Wales to rejoin the European Union’s Erasmus+ mobility scheme.

In a joint letter initiated by Norbert Röttgen and Anthony Gonzalez ahead of the 47th G7 summit in 2021, McAllister joined some 70 legislators from Europe, the US and Japan in calling upon their leaders to take a tough stance on China and to "avoid becoming dependent" on the country for technology including artificial intelligence and 5G.

== Personal life ==
McAllister is married to Dunja McAllister, née Kolleck, who is also a lawyer. He lives in Bad Bederkesa in the district of Cuxhaven. He supports Rangers FC and Hannover 96.

== Honours and awards ==
- Honorary doctorate, University of Edinburgh, 2012
- MEP Award - Lifetime Achievement Award 2025

== See also ==
- List of people from Berlin

Political offices
Preceded by Christian Wulff	Chairman of the Christian Democratic Union in the Landtag of Lower Saxony; 2003–2010	Succeeded by Björn Thümler
Preceded by Christian Wulff	Prime Minister of Lower Saxony; 2010–2013	Succeeded by Stephan Weil
Party political offices
Preceded by Christian Wulff	Chairman of Christian Democratic Union of Lower Saxony; 2008–2016	Succeeded by Bernd Althusmann
