= Uwe Schünemann =

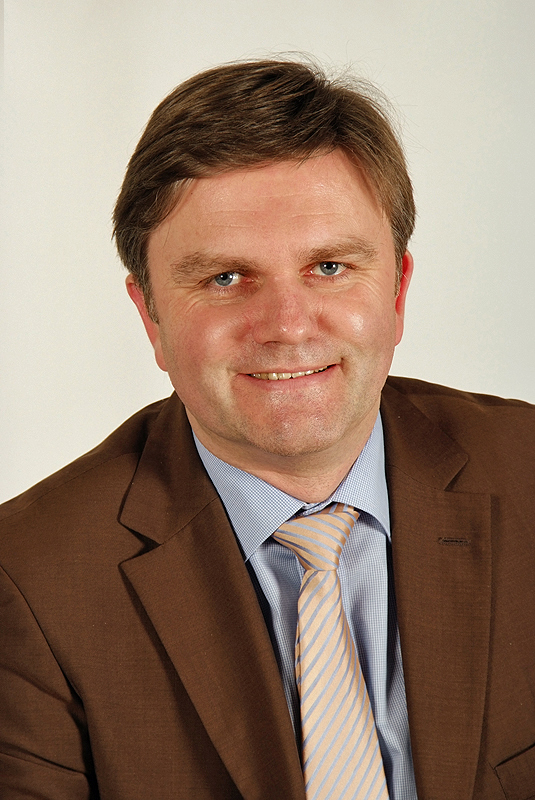
- Schünemann in 2009

Minister of the Interior and Sports of Lower Saxony
- In office 4 March 2003 – 19 February 2013
- Preceded by: Heiner Bartling
- Succeeded by: Boris Pistorius

Personal details
- Born: 8 August 1964 (age 61) Stadtoldendorf, Holzminden (district), Lower Saxony, Germany
- Party: CDU
- Website: www.uwe-schuenemann.de

Uwe Schuenemann (born 8 August 1964) is a German politician (Christian Democratic Union of Germany) and former interior minister of the German state of the federation Lower Saxony. He is known for relatively hard-line stances.
