= 2003 Lower Saxony state election =

State election in Lower Saxony, Germany

- 2 February 2003

All 183 seats in the Landtag of Lower Saxony 92 seats needed for a majority
- Turnout: 3,984,009 (67.0%) ▼6.8%
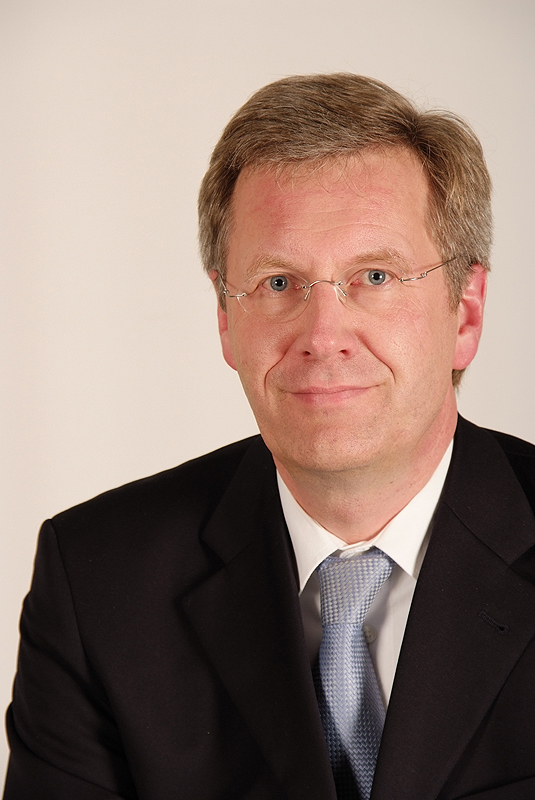

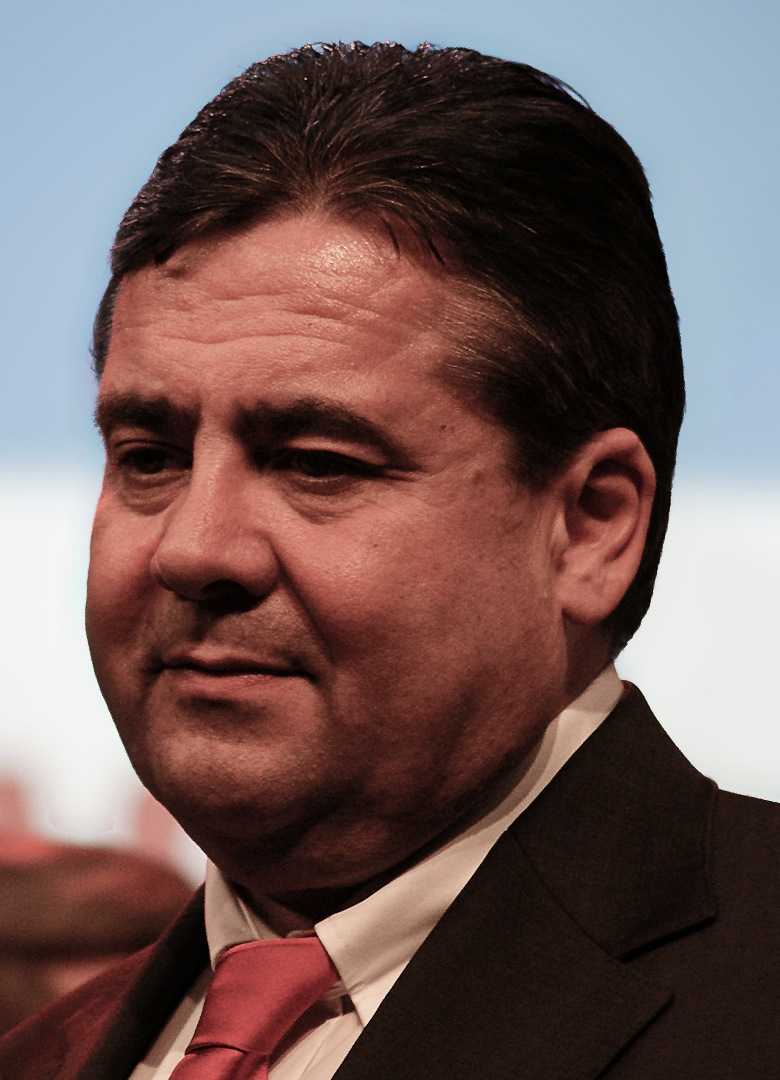
	First party	Second party
Leader	Christian Wulff	Sigmar Gabriel
Party	CDU	SPD
Last election	62 seats, 35.9%	83 seats, 47.9%
Seats won	91	63
Seat change	▲29	▼20
Popular vote	1,925,055	1,330,156
Percentage	48.3%	33.4%
Swing	▲12.4%	▼14.5%
	Third party	Fourth party
Party	FDP	Greens
Last election	0 seats, 4.9%	12 seats, 7.0%
Seats won	15	14
Seat change	▲15	▲2
Popular vote	323,107	304,532
Percentage	8.1%	7.6%
Swing	▲3.2%	▲0.6%
- Results for the single-member constituencies
Minister-President before election
Sigmar Gabriel
SPD
Elected Minister-President
Christian Wulff
CDU

The 2003 Lower Saxony state election was held on 2 February 2003 to elect the members of the 15th Landtag of Lower Saxony. The incumbent Social Democratic Party (SPD) majority government led by Minister-President Sigmar Gabriel was defeated. The Christian Democratic Union (CDU) came up one seat short of a majority, and formed a coalition with the Free Democratic Party (FDP). CDU leader Christian Wulff was subsequently elected minister-president.

== Background ==
The election in Lower Saxony had larger significance than just in the state itself. Defeat for the Social Democrats in the election would mean they lost their slim majority in the upper house of the German parliament, the Bundesrat. It was thought this might cause the collapse of Gerhard Schröder's national coalition government between the Social Democrats and the Green Party.

== Campaign and issues ==
The economy was seen as the most important issue in the election, with the Social Democrats suffering as a result.

Opinion polls in December 2002 showed the Christian Democrats in the lead with 43% as against 34% for the Social Democrats.

== Parties ==
The table below lists parties represented in the 14th Landtag of Lower Saxony.

Name		Ideology	Leader(s)	1998 result	
Name		Ideology	Leader(s)	Votes (%)	Seats
SPD	Social Democratic Party of Germany; Sozialdemokratische Partei Deutschlands	Social democracy	Sigmar Gabriel	47.9%	83 / 157
CDU	Christian Democratic Union of Germany; Christlich Demokratische Union Deutschlands	Christian democracy	Christian Wulff	35.9%	62 / 157
Grüne	Alliance 90/The Greens; Bündnis 90/Die Grünen	Green politics		7.0%	12 / 157

== Opinion polling ==
Polling firm	Fieldwork date	Sample size	SPD	CDU	Grüne	FDP	Others	Lead
2003 state election	2 Feb 2003	–	33.4	48.3	7.6	8.1	2.5	14.9
Forsa	27–30 Jan 2003	1,014	33	48	8	7	4	15
Forsa	20–24 Jan 2003	1,103	35	48	8	6	3	13
Emnid	23 Jan 2003	?	37	46	9	5	3	9
Infratest dimap	16–20 Jan 2003	1,000	36	48	7	5	4	12
Forsa	13–18 Jan 2003	1,008	36	48	8	5	3	12
Infratest dimap	9–13 Jan 2003	1,000	37	46	8	6	3	9
Forsa	6–10 Jan 2003	1,027	37	46	9	5	3	9
Forschungsgruppe Wahlen	6–9 Jan 2003	1,044	37	45	8	6	4	8
Forsa	27 Dec 2002–3 Jan 2003	1,122	36	46	10	5	3	10
Infratest dimap	2–4 Dec 2002	1,000	40	45	7	5	3	5
Emnid	14–20 Nov 2002	1,003	34	43	12	6	5	9
Forsa	23 Sep 2002	?	47	36.5	7.5	4.5	4.5	11.5
Emnid	30 Aug–4 Sep 2002	1,000	42	38	7	8	5	4
Infratest dimap	14 Jun 2002	1,000	45	35	6	11	3	10
Emnid	31 May 2002	?	39	37	6	12	6	2
Forsa	17 Apr 2002	?	43	41	6	4	6	2
Emnid	21–27 Feb 2002	1,000	43	37	7	8	5	6
Forsa	11–27 Feb 2002	1,327	43	39	6	5	7	4
Infratest dimap	31 Aug 2001	?	44	36	6	9	5	8
Forsa	22 Jun 2001	?	46	37	7	5	5	9
Infratest dimap	20 Feb 2001	?	48	35	7	5	5	13
Forsa	28 Oct 1999	?	41	46	6	4	3	5
Infratest dimap	21–24 Oct 1999	1,000	41	46	5	4	4	5
1998 state election	1 Mar 1998	–	47.9	35.9	7.0	4.9	4.3	12.0

== Election result ==
Summary of the 2 February 2003 election results for the Landtag of Lower Saxony
Party	Votes	%	+/-	Seats	+/-	Seats %
Christian Democratic Union (CDU)	1,925,055	48.3	▲12.4	91	▲29	49.7
Social Democratic Party (SPD)	1,330,156	33.4	▼14.5	63	▼20	34.4
Free Democratic Party (FDP)	323,107	8.1	▲3.2	15	▲15	8.2
Alliance 90/The Greens (Grüne)	304,532	7.6	▲0.6	14	▲2	7.7
Party for a Rule of Law Offensive (Schill party)	40,342	1.0	New	0	New	0
Party of Democratic Socialism (PDS)	21,560	0.5	▲0.5	0	±0	0
Others	39,257	1.0		0	±0	0
Total	3,984,009	100.0		183	▲26	
Voter turnout		67.0	▼6.8			

Popular Vote
CDU	48.32%
SPD	33.38%
FDP	8.11%
B'90/GRÜNE	7.64%
SCHILL	1.01%
PDS	0.54%
Other	0.99%

Landtag seats
CDU	49.73%
SPD	34.43%
FDP	8.20%
B'90/GRÜNE	7.65%
