= 2008 Lower Saxony state election =

State election in Lower Saxony, Germany

← 2003	27 January 2008	2013 →

All 152 seats in the Landtag of Lower Saxony 77 seats needed for a majority
- Turnout: 3,422,552 (57.0%) ▼10.0%
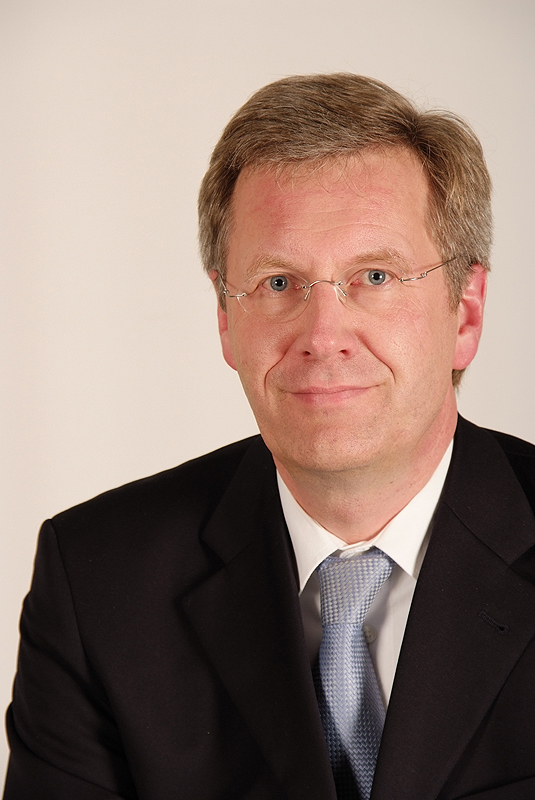

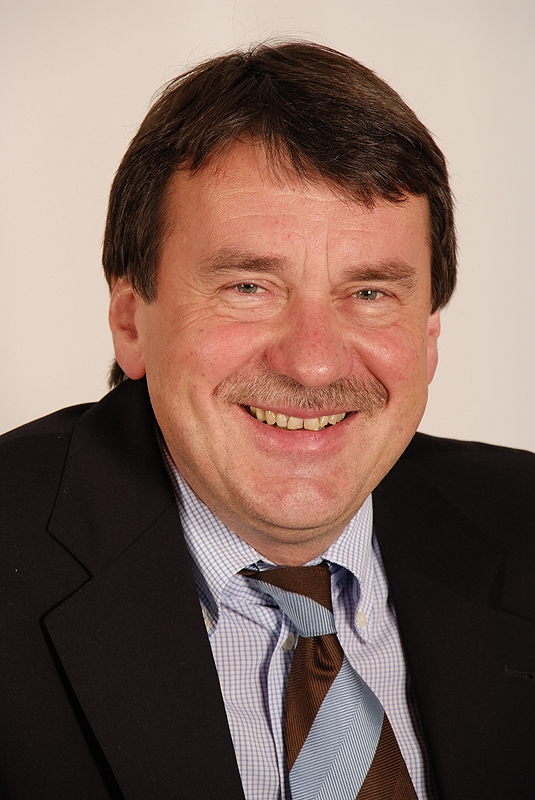

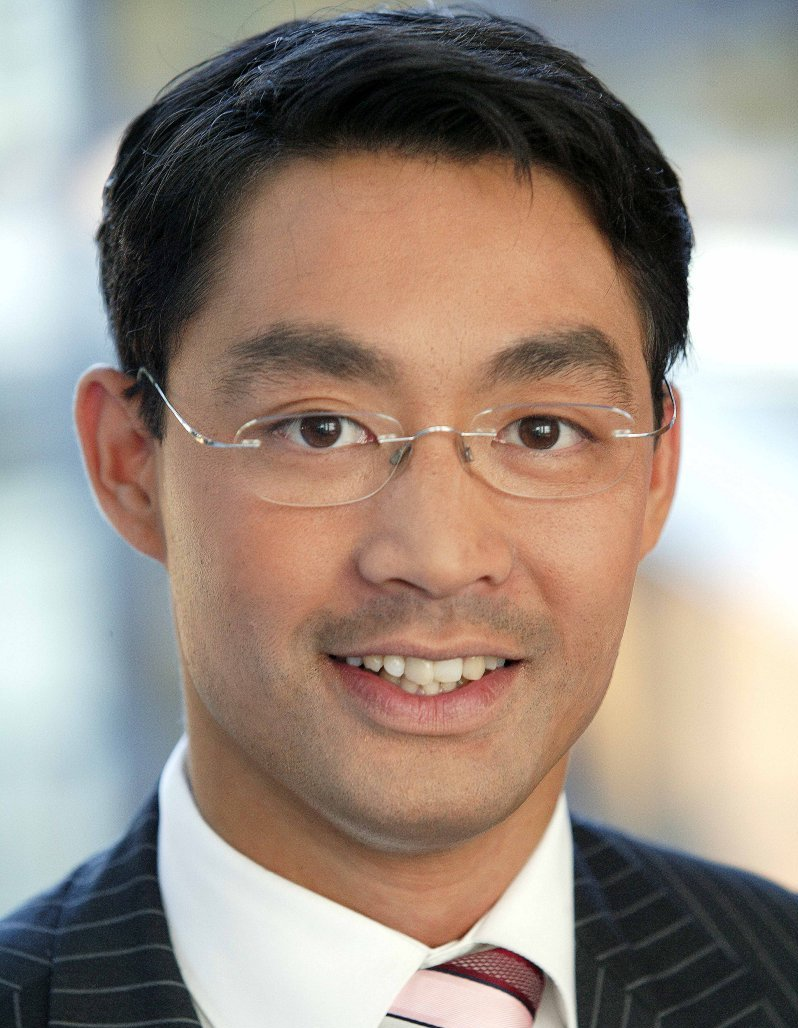

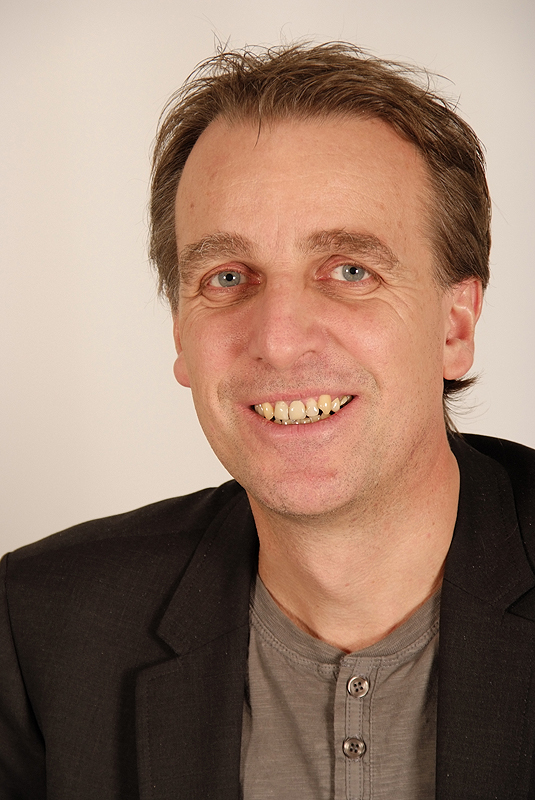

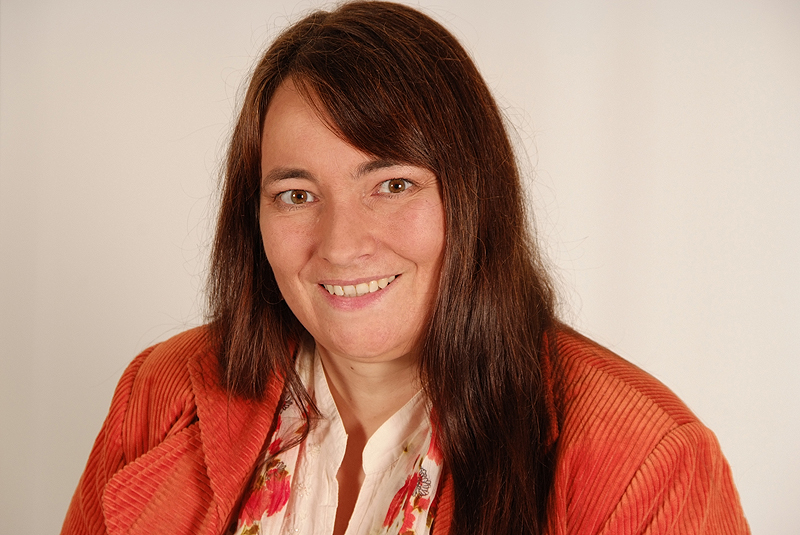
	First party	Second party	Third party
Leader	Christian Wulff	Wolfgang Jüttner	Philipp Rösler
Party	CDU	SPD	FDP
Last election	91 seats, 48.3%	63 seats, 33.4%	15 seats, 8.1%
Seats won	68	48	13
Seat change	▼23	▼15	▼2
Popular vote	1,455,687	1,035,894	279,557
Percentage	42.5%	30.3%	8.2%
Swing	▼5.8%	▼3.1%	▲0.1%
	Fourth party	Fifth party
Leader	Stefan Wenzel	Kreszentia Flauger
Party	Greens	Left
Last election	14 seats, 7.6%	0 seats, 0.5%
Seats won	12	11
Seat change	▼2	▲11
Popular vote	273,934	243,106
Percentage	8.0%	7.1%
Swing	▲0.4%	▲6.6%
- Results for the single-member constituencies
Minister-President before election
Christian Wulff
CDU
Elected Minister-President
Christian Wulff
CDU

The 2008 Lower Saxony state election was held on 27 January 2008 to elect the members of the 16th Landtag of Lower Saxony. The incumbent coalition government of the Christian Democratic Union (CDU) and Free Democratic Party (FDP) led by Minister-President Christian Wulff was re-elected with a reduced majority.

== Campaign ==
Lower Saxony was seen as a stronghold of the Christian Democratic Union and their leader Christian Wulff was seen as likely to easily defeat the Social Democrats. The election in Lower Saxony took place on the same day as the 2008 Hessian state election; Wulff was seen as a more moderate leader than Roland Koch in Hesse and consequently more likely to perform better in the election. The CDU government had held spending down, introduced tuition fees for university students, while supporting the minimum wage. The Social Democrats (SPD) led their campaign with a call for a national minimum wage for all workers. The SPD leader in Lower Saxony, Wolfgang Jüttner, was little known to voters and unusually during the campaign made an attack on Wolff for his personal life.

== Parties ==
The table below lists parties represented in the 15th Landtag of Lower Saxony.

Name		Ideology	Leader(s)	2003 result	
Name		Ideology	Leader(s)	Votes (%)	Seats
CDU	Christian Democratic Union of Germany; Christlich Demokratische Union Deutschlands	Christian democracy	Christian Wulff	48.3%	91 / 183
SPD	Social Democratic Party of Germany; Sozialdemokratische Partei Deutschlands	Social democracy	Wolfgang Jüttner	33.6%	63 / 184
FDP	Free Democratic Party; Freie Demokratische Partei	Classical liberalism	Philipp Rösler	8.1%	15 / 183
Grüne	Alliance 90/The Greens; Bündnis 90/Die Grünen	Green politics	Stefan Wenzel	7.6%	14 / 183

== Opinion polling ==
Polling firm	Fieldwork date	Sample size	CDU	SPD	FDP	Grüne	Linke	Others	Lead
2008 state election	27 Jan 2008	–	42.5	30.3	8.2	8.0	7.1	3.9	12.2
Forschungsgruppe Wahlen	14–17 Jan 2008	1,001	46	33	7	7	5	2	13
Infratest dimap	14–16 Jan 2008	1,000	44	34	7	7	5	3	10
Infratest dimap	2–4 Jan 2008	1,000	45	33	7	8	3	4	12
Emnid	10 Dec 2007 – 2 Jan 2008	800	45	32	8	9	4	2	13
AMR Düsseldorf	29 Dec 2007	1,000	44	34	7	8	4	3	10
Forschungsgruppe Wahlen	4–6 Dec 2007	1,056	44	34	7	7	4	4	10
Infratest dimap	2–5 Nov 2007	1,000	44	33	7	9	4	3	11
Infratest dimap	5–10 Oct 2007	1,001	45	33	6	8	5	3	12
Emnid	2–6 Oct 2007	1,000	45	31	7	10	4	3	14
Infratest dimap	3–5 Sep 2007	1,000	44	34	7	9	3	3	10
Forsa	1–14 Aug 2007	1,160	47	29	7	9	4	4	18
Forsa	14–29 May 2007	1,047	46	29	8	8	4	4	17
Infratest	3–6 May 2007	1,000	41	36	8	8	4	3	5
Forsa	29 Jan–13 Feb 2007	1,193	46	29	9	9	3	4	17
Infratest dimap	19–24 Jan 2007	1,000	43	34	8	10	2	3	9
Forsa	2–14 Nov 2006	1,080	45	29	10	8	4	4	16
Forsa	25 Sep–17 Oct 2006	1,054	44	30	10	9	4	3	14
Infratest dimap	23–27 Aug 2006	1,000	40	36	8	9	4	3	4
Forsa	17 Jul–1 Aug 2006	1,086	46	31	9	8	3	3	15
Forsa	17 May–6 Jun 2006	1,039	42	36	8	8	3	3	6
Infratest dimap	17–22 Feb 2006	1,000	42	37	8	7	4	2	5
Emnid	7–12 Feb 2005	1,000	43	37	7	10	–	3	6
Emnid	28 Feb 2005	?	44	34	7	10	–	5	10
Infratest dimap	26–31 Jan 2004	1,000	51	29	8	8	–	4	22
GMS	28 Nov–1 Dec 2003	1,000	48.5	30.5	8.5	9.0	–	3.5	17.0
Emnid	27–31 May 2003	1,000	48	31	8	10	1	2	17
2003 state election	2 Feb 2003	–	48.3	33.4	8.1	7.6	0.5	2.0	14.9

== Election result ==
Summary of the 27 January 2008 election results for the Landtag of Lower Saxony
Party	Votes	%	+/-	Seats	+/-	Seats %
Christian Democratic Union (CDU)	1,455,687	42.5	▼5.8	68	▼23	44.7
Social Democratic Party (SPD)	1,035,894	30.3	▼3.1	48	▼15	31.6
Free Democratic Party (FDP)	279,557	8.2	▲0.1	13	▼2	8.6
Alliance 90/The Greens (Grüne)	273,934	8.0	▲0.4	12	▼2	7.9
The Left (Linke)	243,106	7.1	▲6.6	11	▲11	7.2
National Democratic Party (NPD)	52,817	1.5	▲1.5	0	±0	0
Others	81,557	2.4		0	±0	0
Total	3,422,552	100.0		152	▼31	
Voter turnout		57.0	▼10.0			

Popular Vote
CDU	42.53%
SPD	30.27%
FDP	8.17%
B'90/GRÜNE	8.00%
DIE LINKE	7.10%
Other	3.93%

Landtag seats
CDU	44.74%
SPD	31.58%
FDP	8.55%
B'90/GRÜNE	7.89%
DIE LINKE	7.24%

== Outcome ==
The results saw the Christian Democratic Union easily defeat the Social Democrats, despite suffering a drop in votes and seats. As a result, their leader Christian Wulff was seen as having strengthened his chances of succeeding national CDU leader Angela Merkel. The 30.3% of the vote that the Social Democrats won was the worst performance by the party in Lower Saxony since the Second World War, which was described as a 'disaster' for the party. Turnout in the election was 57%.

The Left entered the Landtag for the first time with 7.1% of the vote, comfortably exceeding the 5% electoral threshold. Along with the election in Hesse held on the same day in which The Left also won seats, this was the first time they had achieved representation in any large state in western Germany.
