= Christian Wulff =

President of Germany from 2010 to 2012

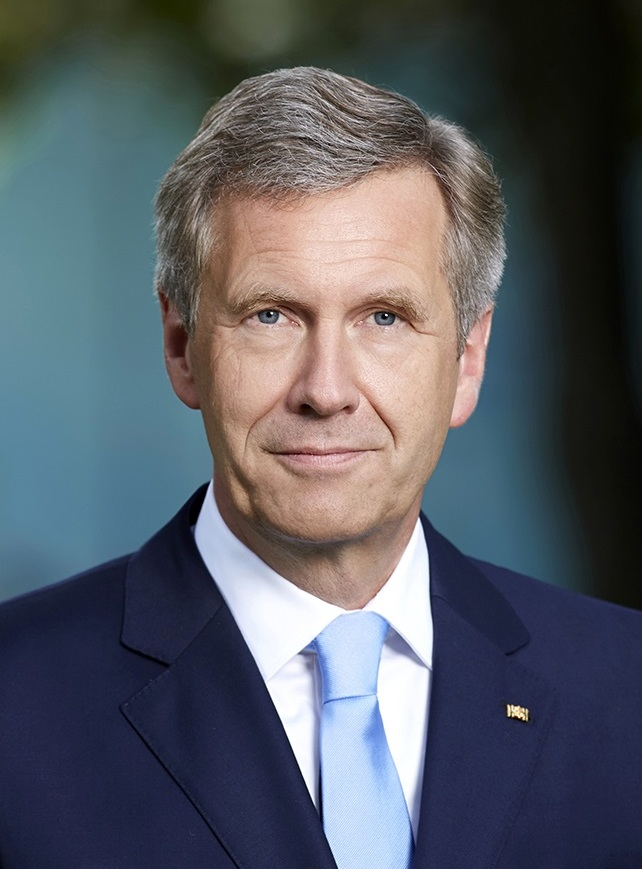
- Wulff in 2014

President of Germany
- In office 30 June 2010 – 17 February 2012
- Chancellor: Angela Merkel
- Preceded by: Horst Köhler (Note: The President of the Bundesrat Jens Böhrnsen served as acting head of state from Köhler's resignation until Wulff's election.)
- Succeeded by: Joachim Gauck (Note: The President of the Bundesrat Horst Seehofer served as acting head of state from Wulff's resignation until Gauck's election.)

Minister-President of Lower Saxony
- In office 4 March 2003 – 30 June 2010
- Deputy: Walter Hirche; Philipp Rösler; Jörg Bode
- Preceded by: Sigmar Gabriel
- Succeeded by: David McAllister

Deputy Leader of the Christian Democratic Union
- In office 7 November 1998 – 30 June 2010
- Leader: Wolfgang Schäuble; Angela Merkel
- Preceded by: Angela Merkel
- Succeeded by: Ursula von der Leyen

Leader of the Christian Democratic Union of Lower Saxony
- In office 20 June 1994 – 19 June 2008
- Preceded by: Josef Stock
- Succeeded by: David McAllister

Leader of the Christian Democratic Union in the Landtag of Lower Saxony
- In office 23 June 1994 – 4 March 2003
- Preceded by: Jürgen Gansäuer
- Succeeded by: David McAllister

Member of the Landtag of Lower Saxony for Osnabrück-West
- In office 23 June 1994 – 11 June 2010
- Preceded by: Karin Detert-Weber
- Succeeded by: Fritz Güntzler

Personal details
- Born: 19 June 1959 (age 67) Osnabrück, Lower Saxony, West Germany
- Party: Christian Democratic Union
- Spouses: Christiane Vogt (m. 1988; div. 2006) Bettina Körner (m. 2008; div. 2020) (m. 2023; div. 2025)
- Children: 2
- Education: University of Osnabrück
- Awards: Toleranzpreis der Evangelischen Akademie Tutzing (2014)
- Website: Official website

Christian Wilhelm Walter Wulff (German: [ˈkʁɪsti̯a(ː)n ˈvɪlhɛlm ˈvaltɐ ˈvʊlf]; born 19 June 1959) is a retired German politician and lawyer who served as President of Germany from 2010 to 2012. A member of the Christian Democratic Union (CDU), he previously served as minister president of the state of Lower Saxony from 2003 to 2010. He was elected to the presidency in the 30 June 2010 presidential election, defeating opposition candidate Joachim Gauck and taking office immediately, although he was not sworn in until 2 July At the age of 51, he became Germany's youngest president.

On 17 February 2012, Wulff resigned as President of Germany, facing the prospect of prosecution for allegations of corruption relating to his prior service as Minister President of Lower Saxony. In 2014, he was acquitted of all corruption charges by the Hanover regional court.

== Early life and education ==
Wulff was born in Osnabrück and is Roman Catholic. He was the first Roman Catholic to hold the post of President of Germany since Heinrich Lübke (1959–1969) and the first President to have been born in the post-World War II period. His father left the family, and he grew up with his mother. As a teenager, he took responsibility for the care of his younger sister after his mother developed multiple sclerosis. After completing his Abitur at the Ernst Moritz Arndt Gymnasium in Osnabrück, Wulff studied law with a specialisation in economics at the University of Osnabrück. He joined the Christian Democratic Union of Germany in 1975. In 1987 and 1990, he passed the first and second state examinations in law, and has since worked as an attorney.

== Political career ==
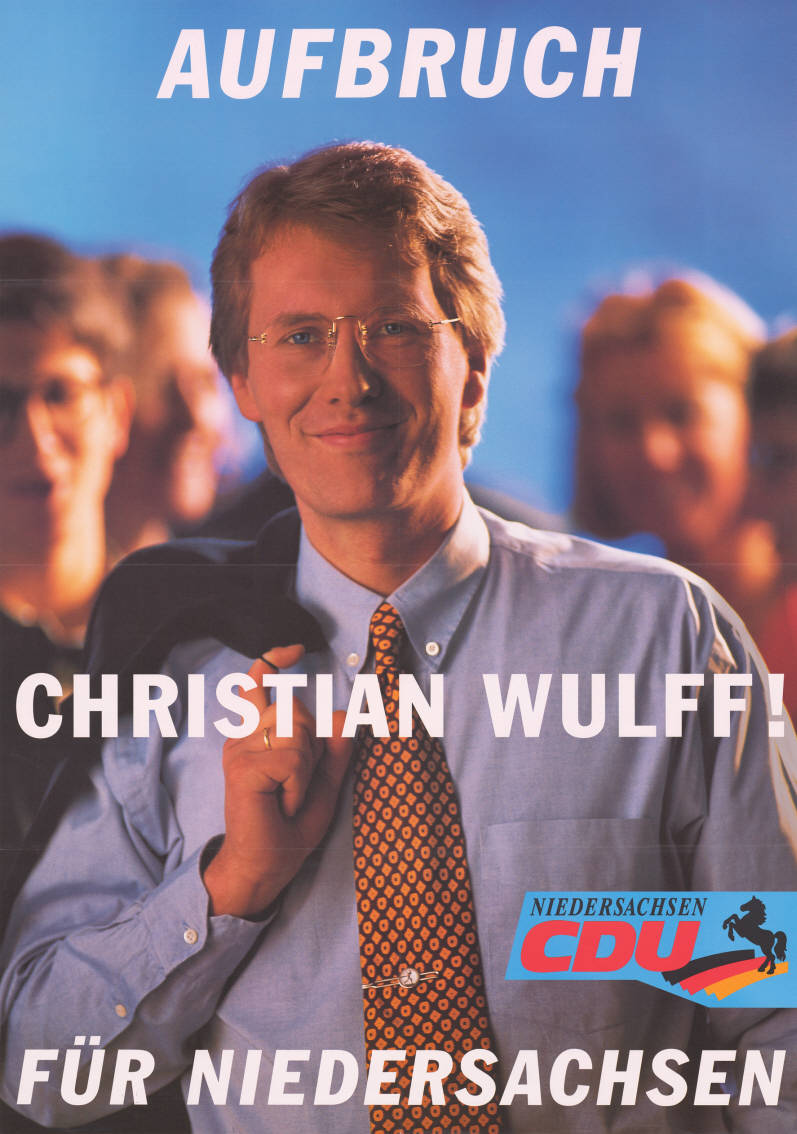
Wulff as candidate for the 1994 Lower Saxony state election

Since 1975, Wulff has been a member of the CDU. From 1978 to 1980, he served as federal chairman of the Schülerunion, a political high school student organization affiliated with the Christian Democrats. From 1979 to 1983, he was on the executive board of the Junge Union and became its state chairman in Lower Saxony in 1983. However, he decided to resign from the board in order to pursue his law degree, which he completed in 1986. The same year, he was elected a city councillor in his hometown. Since 1984, he sat on the CDU's state party council of Lower Saxony, serving as its chairman from 1994 to 2008.

The Christian Democrats made Wulff the candidate for Minister President of the state in the run-up to the 1994 parliamentary election. However, the popular incumbent Gerhard Schröder won an absolute majority in the Lower Saxony legislature, while the state CDU under Wulff received one of its worst results, leading some observers to doubt the wisdom of the provincial party nominating a young and neophyte candidate for Premier. After four years in opposition, the 1998 legislative assembly election brought another opportunity for Wulff to become Minister President. Indeed, the federal Christian Democrat party, led by Chancellor Helmut Kohl, pinned its hopes on Wulff – a Wulff victory would have stopped the inevitable rise of Schröder to the Social Democrat nomination for Chancellor. However, supported by a wave of sympathy for his potential candidacy for chancellor in the 1998 federal election, Schröder was returned to power by an enhanced majority – leaving Wulff to serve five more years as state leader of the opposition.

Schröder won the 1998 federal election, leaving the post of Minister President to his anointed successor, Interior Minister Gerhard Glogowski. The latter soon stumbled over a scandal involving free travel paid by TUI and was succeeded by young parliamentary leader Sigmar Gabriel. In the wake of the 1999 scandal, as well as rising discontent with Schröder's federal cabinet, the Christian Democrats rose in the opinion polls and became a serious contender for power in the 2003 parliamentary election.

Wulff had been one of the four deputy chairmen of the CDU party at the federal level after 7 November 1998, and had been a board member of the Konrad Adenauer Foundation after 2003.

=== 2003 state election ===
With Lower Saxony announcing deeper cuts of education and municipal services, the stage was set for the 2003 election campaign. Wulff entered the race as the favourite to win the election and essentially campaigned on a platform of fiscal restraint and clear-cut reforms in the areas of law enforcement and education. Both issues were decisive in the elections that led to a change in fortunes for the two major parties. The Christian Democrats, in the political wilderness since the 1990 Schröder victory, were returned to power with an absolute majority in the state parliament, gaining 48.3% of the vote. Wulff was sworn in as Minister President on 4 March 2003, as the head of a coalition between centre-right Christian Democrats and liberal Free Democrats (FDP).

=== Policies ===
As Minister President of Lower Saxony, Wulff pursued a multitude of reforms, including a restructuration of the primary education system in the state, as well as an increase in police officers on the beat. When Wulff took office, Lower Saxony faced a severe budget crisis, resulting from years of public deficits. Painful cuts to public expenditure were enacted and implemented against considerable political resistance. The measures included cuts in university funding and in benefits for the blind. Other policies concern the reform of the administration (especially the abolition of certain district authorities). Budgetary problems continued to overshadow Wulff's policies, albeit with somewhat less pressure. Many measures have remained controversial.

Prior to the 2005 federal election, Wulff was mentioned as a potential candidate for the federal chancellorship. In a spring 2005 poll, 28% of all respondents named Wulff as their preferred candidate for the Christian Democratic nomination for Chancellor. As Wulff had only began his first term as Minister President of Lower Saxony in early 2003, he largely dismissed such speculations. Speculation had particularly increased since the December 2004 Christian Democratic federal convention in Düsseldorf, when Wulff was reelected deputy leader of the federal party with roughly 86% of all delegates supporting him. However, the premature dissolution of the Bundestag in 2005 and the subsequent election of Chancellor Angela Merkel largely put an end to further speculation about Wulff's future at the time.

A Wulff candidacy for the CDU nomination for Chancellor was seen to appeal to northerners and liberals within the Christian Democrats. Outside the mold of a typical conservative, he was able to attract swing voters disillusioned with the slowness of reforms, as well as the then rather high rates of unemployment in Germany. Indeed, he worked on increasing his visibility beyond Lower Saxony's confines, particularly by appearing frequently on television shows and giving interviews to the national newspapers. Moreover, Wulff was also acquiring a profile on a broad range of issues, including the reform of the German language, Medicare and social security reform, as well as a modernisation of Germany's federal constitution, the Grundgesetz. In fact, he criticised the consensus reached between the Christian Democratic and Social Democratic parties on the modernisation of Germany's constitution, stating that he felt that the states (Länder) had not been given sufficient powers to deal with their own affairs. Wulff also took a conservative stand on nuclear energy, advocating an extension of the deadlines for the decommissioning of Germany's nuclear reactors.

In a speech, Wulff also expressed his opposition to euthanasia and warned of a retreat of moral values. This was seen as the first attempt to formulate a value-based agenda for the 2008 state, as well as more importantly, the 2009 federal election. Chancellor Merkel had been severely criticised for a lack of emotional warmth during the 2005 federal election campaign, leading to a worse-than-expected result for the Christian Democrats.

Wulff announced on 8 January 2006 that Lower Saxony would become the first state to approve a new model according to which the government will temporarily pay part of the salaries for low-salary jobs, if the employers concerned are willing to employ an employee on a long-term basis. This pilot was supposed to make new jobs more affordable in Germany's notoriously high-wage environment.

=== Wulff and the 2005 federal elections ===
Due to his popularity in Lower Saxony and in federal opinion polls, Wulff was considered to be a contender for the office of Chancellor.

After the 23 May announcement that federal elections were to be advanced to September 2005, Wulff announced that he was not a candidate for the Christian Democrat nomination for Chancellor, particularly as he had not completed his first term as Minister President of Lower Saxony. Instead, Wulff declared his support for the CDU party and parliamentary leader Angela Merkel. Although there was speculation that Wulff would be given a position in the new government, entering federal politics, he remained Minister President of Lower Saxony.

=== President of Germany ===
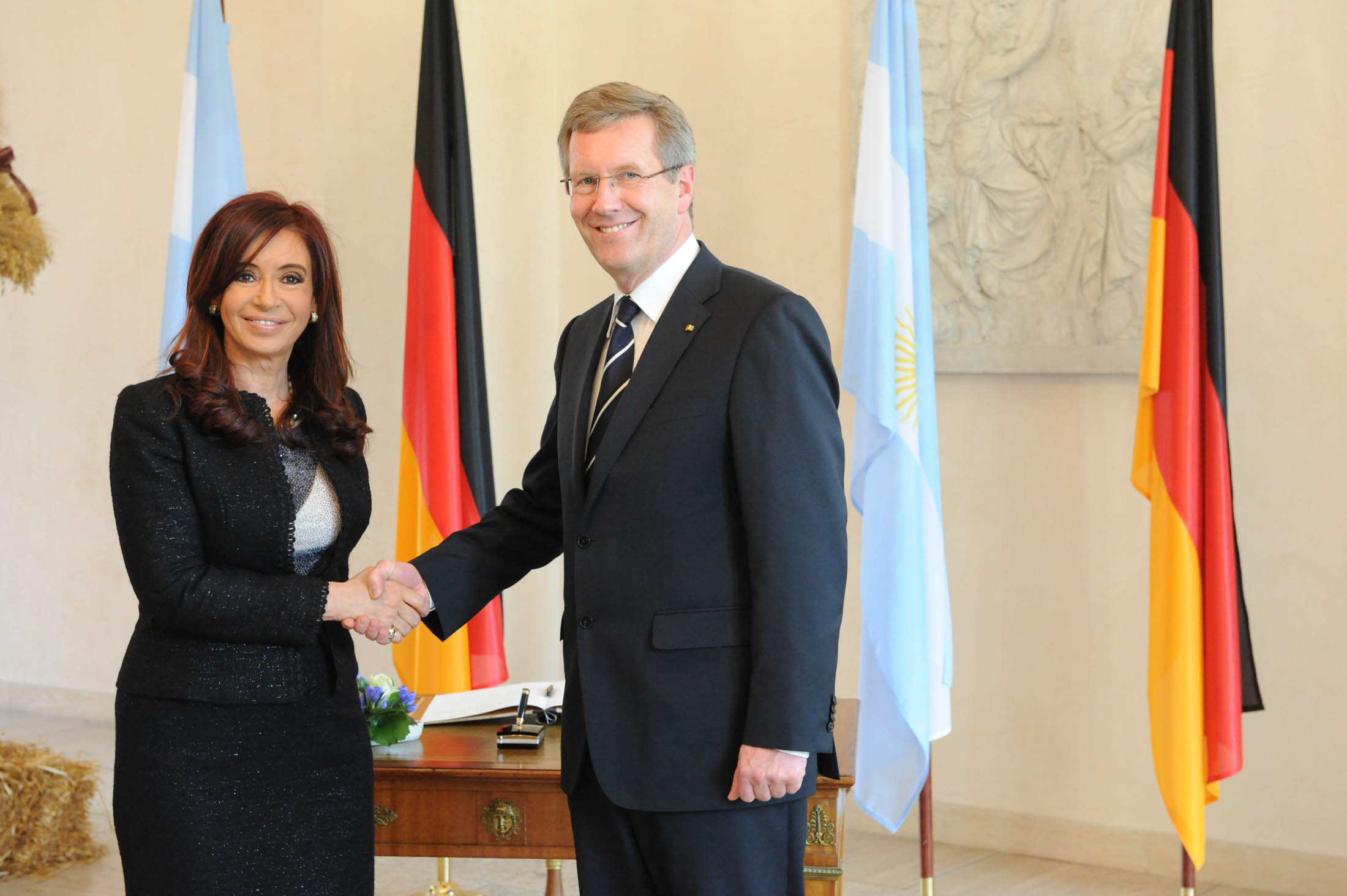
2010 meeting with his Argentine counterpart Cristina Kirchner

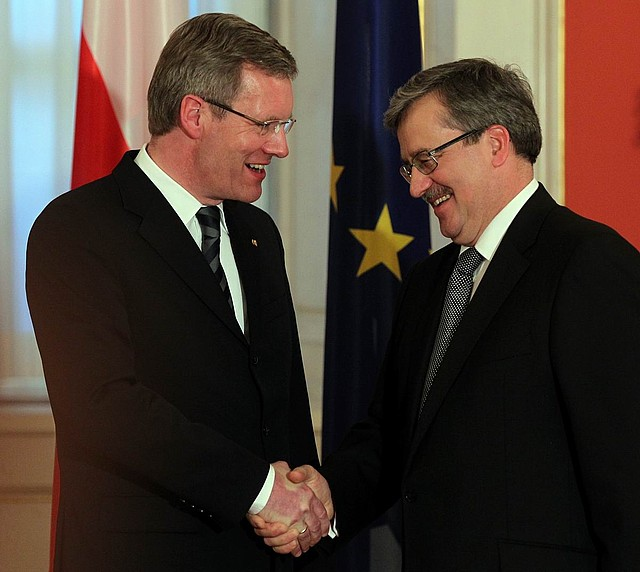
Wulff with then-President of Poland Bronisław Komorowski in 2010

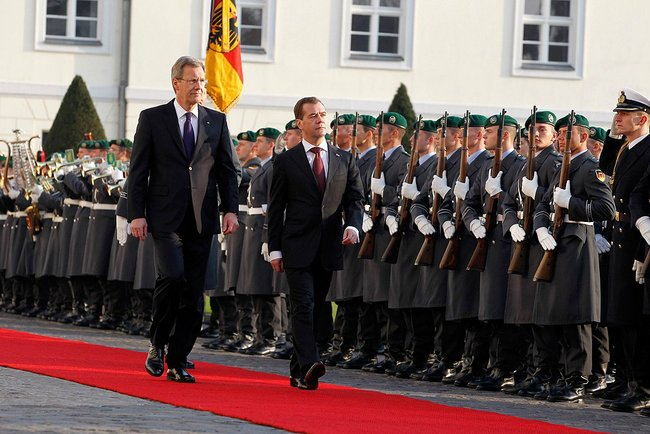
Wulff with then-President of Russia Dmitry Medvedev in 2011

Wulff was elected President of Germany on 30 June 2010 to follow Horst Köhler, who had resigned on 31 May 2010. He won 625 of 1,242 votes on the third ballot of the Federal Convention. He became Germany's youngest president at the age of 51 and was sworn in on 2 July 2010 in front of the Bundestag and the Bundesrat.

His main contender in the election was Joachim Gauck, a civil rights activist from East Germany and former Federal Commissioner for the Stasi Records. Not a member of any party himself, Gauck was nominated by the opposition SPD and Greens as their presidential candidate on 3 June 2010.

Wulff was succeeded as Minister President of Lower Saxony by David McAllister. Wulff's candidacy for President of Germany in the 2010 presidential election was formally confirmed by Angela Merkel, Guido Westerwelle and Horst Seehofer, the heads of the governing CDU, FDP and CSU parties, during the evening of 3 June 2010.

In August 2011, President Wulff opened an economists' conference with a speech on the euro. He criticised the European Central Bank (ECB), which had entered a second round of bond buy-ups from heavily indebted euro-zone nations, calling the plan to stabilise the euro "legally and politically questionable".

=== Scandals, resignation and final acquittal ===
In December 2011, German media reported allegations that Wulff had deceived the Parliament of Lower Saxony in February 2010, during an inquiry into his connections as Minister President of Lower Saxony with a number of affluent businessmen. In particular, there were a number of questions concerning the purchase of a house, for which Wulff accepted a loan from an entrepreneur's family with whom he was friends. In this context, Wulff tried to influence the media coverage in the run-up to the breaking of the scandal. Additional investigations were launched into Wulff's political dealing with various entrepreneurs with whom he and his family spent their private vacations. Since it was not clear who had paid for these holidays, Wulff was subsequently accused of favoritism and unethical behavior. After the district attorney's office in Hanover had requested the lifting of his immunity on 16 February 2012, Wulff then resigned as German President the following day. On 27 February 2014, two years after his resignation, Wulff was acquitted of all corruption charges by the Hanover regional court.

== Life after politics ==
After leaving public office, Wulff represented Germany at several public events, including the state funerals of Abdullah ibn Abd al-Aziz of Saudi Arabia (2015) and of former Prime Minister Shinzo Abe of Japan (2022) as well as the inauguration of President Volodymyr Zelenskyy of Ukraine (2019) and inauguration of President Recep Tayyip Erdoğan of Turkey (2023). Speaking at the 80th anniversary of the liberation of Buchenwald on 6 April 2025, Wulff also criticized the Alternative for Germany (AfD), saying that those who "trivialize" the party "are ignoring the fact that the Alternative for Germany's ideology is creating a breeding ground for people to feel uncomfortable in Germany and that they are actually in real danger".

In 2016 Wulff was awarded the Mercator Visiting Professorship for Political Management at the Universität Essen-Duisburg's NRW School of Governance. He gave both seminars and lectures at the university. In August 2017, it was revealed that Wulff also works as an advisor for the German branch of Yargici, a Turkish high-street fashion company.

== Awards and recognitions ==
- 2014 Toleranzpreis der Evangelischen Akademie Tutzing

== Personal life ==
Christian Wulff met his first wife, lawyer Christiane Vogt (born 1961), when they were both law students in Osnabrück in 1983. They married in March 1988 and have a daughter, Annalena (born 1993). In June 2006, Wulff announced their divorce. Wulff subsequently married Bettina Körner (born 1973), on 21 March 2008 at a ceremony in Schloss Herrenhausen, near Hanover. She has a son Leander Balthasar (born 2003) from a previous relationship. On 12 May 2008, she gave birth to their first child together, a boy named Linus. Wulff and second wife Bettina announced their separation in January 2013, and he moved out of their Hannover home. They started divorce proceedings in March 2015, but reconciled a mere two months thereafter. They separated a second time in 2018.

== Notes ==
Party political offices
Preceded by Jürgen Gansäuer	Leader of the Christian Democratic Union of Lower Saxony; 1994–2008	Succeeded by David McAllister
Political offices
Preceded by Sigmar Gabriel	Minister-President of Lower Saxony; 2003–2010	Succeeded by David McAllister
Preceded by Horst Köhler	President of Germany; 2010–2012	Succeeded by Joachim Gauck
