= Lies Cabinet =

State government of Lower Saxony, Germany

Cabinet of Olaf Lies Cabinet Lies
- 31st Cabinet of Lower Saxony
- 20 May 2025 -
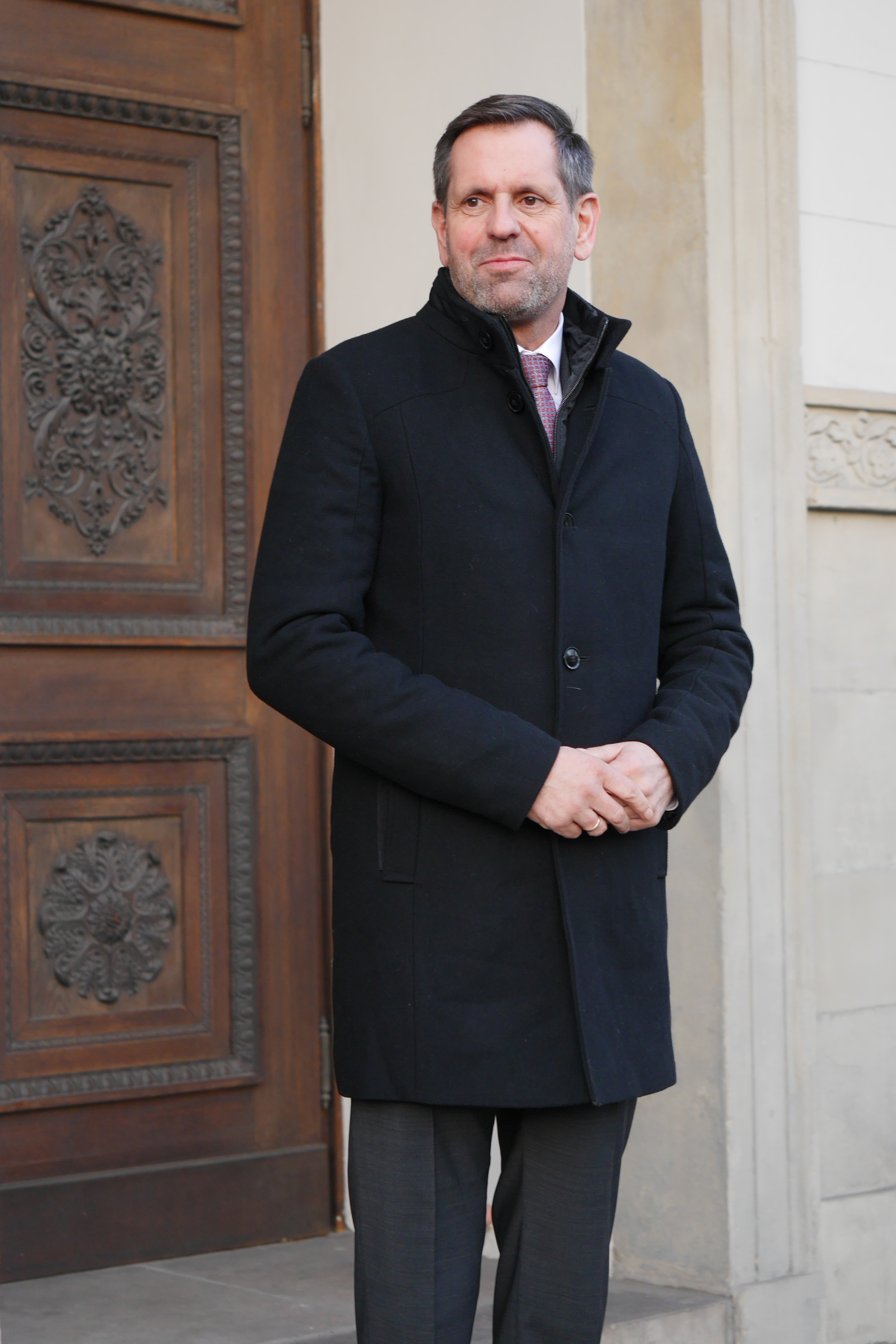
- Olaf Lies in 2023
- Date formed: 20 May 2025

People and organisations
- Minister-President: Olaf Lies
- Deputy Minister-President: Julia Hamburg
- No. of ministers: 10
- Member parties: Social Democratic Party; Alliance 90/The Greens
- Status in legislature: Coalition government (Majority)
- Opposition parties: Christian Democratic Union; Alternative for Germany

History
- Election: 2022 Lower Saxony state election
- Legislature term: 19th Landtag of Lower Saxony
- Predecessor: Third Weil cabinet

The Lies Cabinet is the current state government of Lower Saxony. It was formed on 20 May 2025, after the retirement of long-serving Minister-President of Lower Saxony Stephan Weil after 12 years in office. It is the 31st Cabinet of Lower Saxony.

It succeeded the Third Weil cabinet as a continuation of the existing Red-green coalition between the Social Democratic Party (SPD) and Alliance 90/The Greens (GRÜNE) which was formed after the 2022 Lower Saxony state election, subsequently elected by the members of the Landtag of Lower Saxony. Excluding the Minister-President, the cabinet comprises ten ministers. Six are members of the SPD and four are members of the Greens.

== Composition ==
| Portfolio | Minister | Party | Took office | Left office |
|---|---|---|---|---|
| Minister-President | Olaf Lies born 8 May 1967 (age 59) | SPD | 20 May 2025 | Incumbent |
| Deputy Minister-President Minister for Education | Julia Hamburg born 26 June 1986 (age 40) | GRÜNE | 20 May 2025 | Incumbent |
| Minister for Interior Affairs, Sport and Digitalisation | Daniela Behrens born 12 May 1968 (age 58) | SPD | 20 May 2025 | Incumbent |
| Minister for Economic Affairs, Housing and Transport | Grant Hendrik Tonne born 22 June 1976 (age 50) | SPD | 20 May 2025 | Incumbent |
| Minister for Environment, Energy and Climate Protection | Christian Meyer born 23 July 1975 (age 51) | GRÜNE | 20 May 2025 | Incumbent |
| Minister for Finance | Gerald Heere born 18 April 1979 (age 47) | GRÜNE | 20 May 2025 | Incumbent |
| Minister for Justice | Kathrin Wahlmann born 4 August 1977 (age 49) | SPD | 20 May 2025 | Incumbent |
| Minister for Food, Agriculture and Consumer Protection | Miriam Staudte born 4 November 1975 (age 51) | GRÜNE | 20 May 2025 | Incumbent |
| Minister for Science and Culture | Falko Mohrs born 23 July 1984 (age 42) | SPD | 20 May 2025 | Incumbent |
| Minister for Social Affairs, Employment, Health and Equality | Andreas Philippi born 4 July 1965 (age 61) | SPD | 20 May 2025 | Incumbent |
| Minister for Europe and Regional Development | Melanie Walter born 9 December 1973 (age 52) | SPD | 20 May 2025 | Incumbent |

== Summary of Changes ==
| * Olaf Lies succeeds Stephan Weil as Minister President | * Grant Hendrik Tonne succeeds Lies as Minister for Economy, Housing and Transport. | * Daniela Behrens takes on additional portfolio of Digitalisation from Lies. | * Melanie Walter replaces Wiebke Osigus as Minister for Europe and Regional Development. |
