= Cabinet Weil III =

State government of Lower Saxony

Third Cabinet of Stephan Weil Weil III
- 30th Cabinet of Lower Saxony
- 8 November 2022 – 20 May 2025
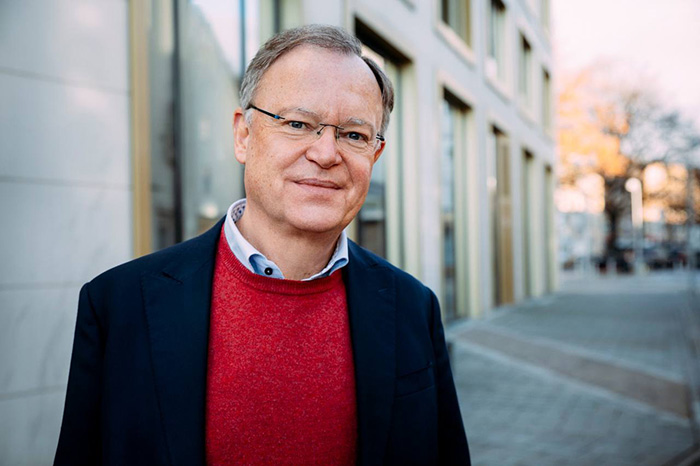
- Stephan Weil in December 2020
- Date formed: 8 November 2022
- Date dissolved: 20 May 2025

People and organisations
- Minister-President: Stephan Weil
- Deputy Minister-President: Julia Hamburg
- No. of ministers: 10
- Member parties: Social Democratic Party; Alliance 90/The Greens
- Status in legislature: Coalition government (Majority)
- Opposition parties: Christian Democratic Union; Alternative for Germany

History
- Election: 2022 Lower Saxony state election
- Legislature term: 19th Landtag of Lower Saxony
- Predecessor: Second Weil cabinet
- Successor: Lies Cabinet

The third Weil cabinet was the state government of Lower Saxony from 8 November 2022 to 20 May 2025, after Stephan Weil was elected as Minister-President of Lower Saxony by the members of the Landtag of Lower Saxony. It was the 30th Cabinet of Lower Saxony.

It was formed after the 2022 Lower Saxony state election by the Social Democratic Party (SPD) and Alliance 90/The Greens (GRÜNE). Excluding the Minister-President, the cabinet comprises ten ministers. Six are members of the SPD and four are members of the Greens.

== Formation ==
The previous cabinet was a coalition government of the SPD and Christian Democratic Union (CDU) led by Minister-President Stephan Weil of the SPD.

The election took place on 9 October 2022, and resulted in losses for both governing parties. The SPD remained the largest party and increased its lead over the CDU. The opposition Greens increased their vote share to a record 14.5%, while the AfD also improved to 11%.

Overall, the incumbent coalition retained its majority. Minister-President Weil ruled out continuing the grand coalition and voiced his preference for a coalition with the Greens. Four days after the election on 13 October, the SPD and Greens agreed to preliminary discussions, with the goal of finalising government negotiations by 3 November. Formal coalition talks began on schedule on 26 October and concluded successfully just a few days later on 31 October. The coalition pact was approved by both parties and signed on 7 November.

Weil was elected as Minister-President by the Landtag on 8 November 2022, winning 82 votes out of 145 cast.

== Composition ==
Portfolio	Minister	Party	Took office	Left office	State secretaries
Minister-President	Stephan Weil born 15 December 1958 (age 67)	SPD	8 November 2022	20 May 2025	Jörg Mielke (Head of the State Chancellery); Anke Pörksen (Speaker for the State Government)
Deputy Minister-President Minister for Education	Julia Hamburg born 26 June 1986 (age 39)	GRÜNE	8 November 2022	Incumbent	Marco Hartrich; Andrea Hoops
Minister for Interior and Sport	Boris Pistorius born 14 March 1960 (age 65)	SPD	8 November 2022	18 January 2023	Stephan Manke
Minister for Interior and Sport	Daniela Behrens born 12 May 1968 (age 57)	SPD	25 January 2023	Incumbent	Stephan Manke
Minister for Economy, Housing, Transport and Digitalisation	Olaf Lies born 8 May 1967 (age 58)	SPD	8 November 2022	20 May 2025	Frank Doods
Minister for Environment, Energy and Climate Protection	Christian Meyer born 23 July 1975 (age 50)	GRÜNE	8 November 2022	Incumbent	Anka Dobslaw
Minister for Finance	Gerald Heere born 18 April 1979 (age 46)	GRÜNE	8 November 2022	Incumbent	Sabine Tegtmeyer-Dette
Minister for Justice	Kathrin Wahlmann born 4 August 1977 (age 48)	SPD	8 November 2022	Incumbent	Thomas Smollich
Minister for Food, Agriculture and Consumer Protection	Miriam Staudte born 4 November 1975 (age 50)	GRÜNE	8 November 2022	Incumbent	Michael Marahrens
Minister for Science and Culture	Falko Mohrs born 23 July 1984 (age 41)	SPD	8 November 2022	Incumbent	Joachim Schachtner
Minister for Social Affairs, Labour, Health and Equality	Daniela Behrens born 12 May 1968 (age 57)	SPD	8 November 2022	25 January 2023	Christine Arbogast
Minister for Social Affairs, Labour, Health and Equality	Andreas Philippi born 4 July 1965 (age 60)	SPD	25 January 2023	Incumbent	Christine Arbogast
Minister for Federal and European Affairs and Regional Development	Wiebke Osigus born 27 June 1981 (age 44)	SPD	8 November 2022	Incumbent	Matthias Wunderling-Weilbier
