= Falko Mohrs =

German politician

- Mohrs in 2025

Minister for Science and Culture of Lower Saxony
- Incumbent
- Assumed office 8 November 2022
- Minister-President: Stephan Weil; Olaf Lies
- Preceded by: Björn Thümler

Member of the Bundestag; for Helmstedt – Wolfsburg
- In office 24 October 2017 – 8 November 2022
- Preceded by: Günter Lach
- Succeeded by: Alexander Bartz

Personal details
- Born: 23 July 1984 (age 42) Wolfsburg, West Germany
- Party: Social Democratic

Falko Mohrs (born 23 July 1984) is a German politician of the Social Democratic Party (SPD) who has been serving as State Minister for Science and Culture in the government of Lower Saxony since 2022. He previously was a member of the Bundestag from the state of Lower Saxony from 2017 to 2022.

== Political career ==
=== Member of the German Parliament (2017–2022) ===
Mohrs became a member of the Bundestag in the 2017 German federal election. He was a member of the Committee on Economic Affairs and Energy and the Committee on the Digital Agenda. In this capacity, he served as his parliamentary group's rapporteur on the digital economy and 5G.

In addition to his committee assignments, Mohrs was part of the German Parliamentary Friendship Group for Relations with the Central African States.

In the negotiations to form a so-called traffic light coalition of the SPD, the Green Party and the Free Democrats (FDP) following the 2021 German elections, Mohrs was part of his party's delegation in the working group on digital innovation and infrastructure, co-chaired by Jens Zimmermann, Malte Spitz and Andreas Pinkwart.

=== Career in state government ===
In the negotiations to form a third cabinet under Minister-President of Lower Saxony Stephan Weil following the 2022 state elections, Mohrs was part of the leadership team of his party's delegation. He was later appointed State Minister for Science and Culture in the new state government.

In his capacity as minister, Mohrs has been chairing the Standing Conference of the Ministers of Education and Cultural Affairs (KMK) since 2023.

In the negotiations to form a Grand Coalition under the leadership of Friedrich Merz's Christian Democrats (CDU together with the Bavarian CSU) and the SPD following the 2025 German elections, Moors was part of the SPD delegation in the working group on education, research and innovation, led by Karin Prien, Katrin Staffler and Oliver Kaczmarek.

== Other activities ==
- Braunschweigische Stiftung, Member of the Board of Trustees (since 2022)
- Kulturstiftung der Länder, Member of the Board of Trustees (since 2022)
- Niedersächsische Staatstheater Hannover, Chair of the Supervisory Board (since 2022)
- NORD/LB Kulturstiftung, Member of the Board of Trustees (since 2022)
- Prussian Cultural Heritage Foundation, Member of the Board of Trustees (since 2022)
- Stiftung Lesen, Member of the Board of Trustees (since 2022)
- Business Forum of the Social Democratic Party of Germany, Member of the Political Advisory Board (since 2020)
- Federal Network Agency for Electricity, Gas, Telecommunications, Post and Railway (BNetzA), Alternate Member of the Advisory Board
- IG Metall, Member
- Reservist Association of Deutsche Bundeswehr, Member
- Association of Christian Guides and Scouts (VCP), Member

== Personal life ==
Mohrs is gay.
