= Barbara Otte-Kinast =

German politician

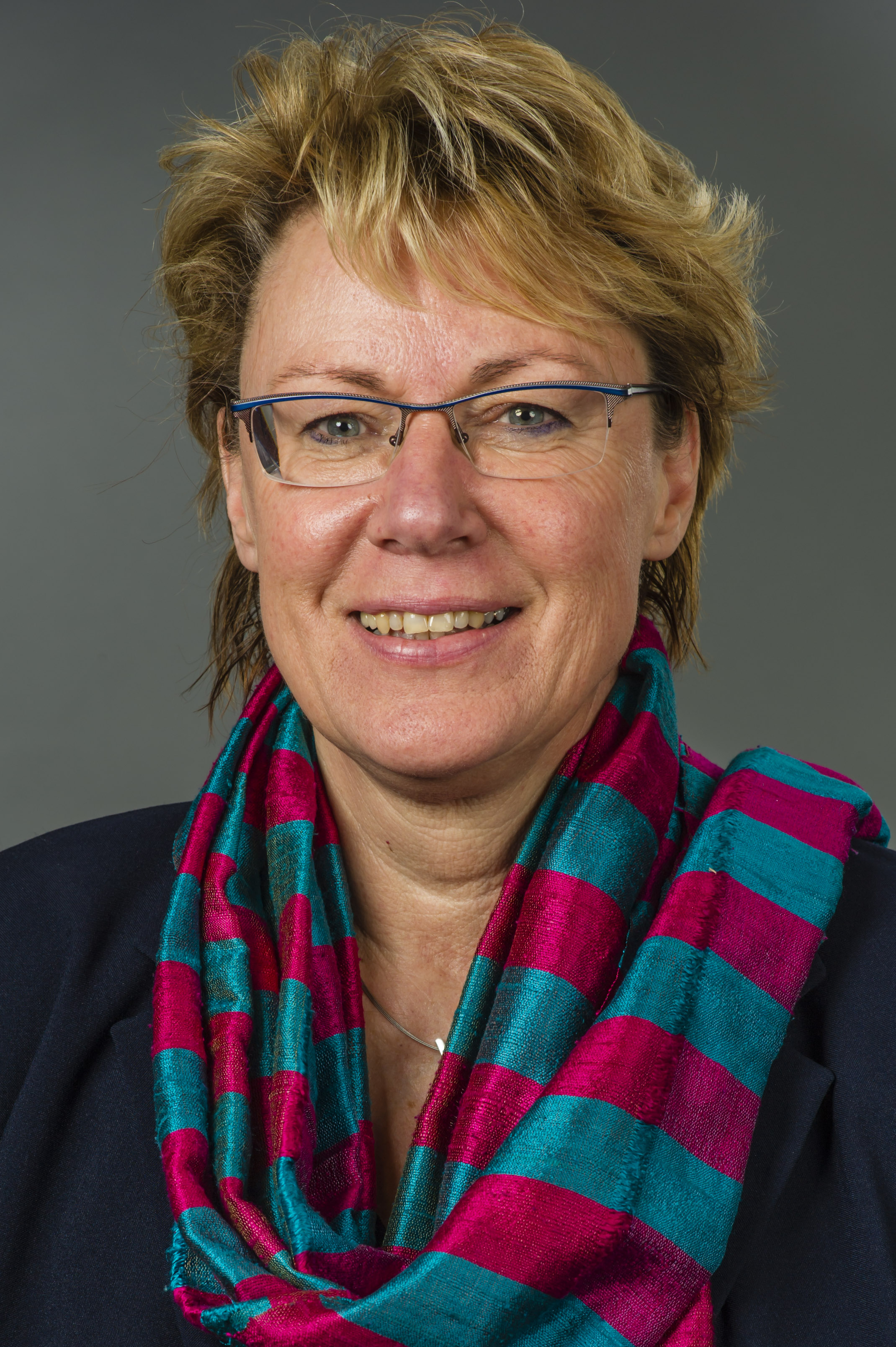

Minister of Food, Agriculture, Consumer Protection of Lower Saxony
- In office 22 November 2017 – 8 November 2022
- Preceded by: Christian Meyer
- Succeeded by: Miriam Staudte

Personal details
- Born: 18 September 1964 (age 61) Ehmen, Germany
- Party: Christian Democratic Union
- Spouse: Jürgen Kinast
- Children: 3

Barbara Otte-Kinast (born 18 September 1964 in Ehmen) is a German politician of the Christian Democratic Union (CDU) who has been serving as a member of the State Parliament of Lower Saxony since the 2022 elections.

== Political career ==
From 2017 to 2022, Otte-Kinast served as State Minister of Food, Agriculture, Consumer Protection and State Development in the cabinet of Minister-President Stephan Weil. In this capacity, she was one of the state's representatives at the Bundesrat, where she served on the Committee on Agricultural Policy and Consumer Protection.

During her time in office, Otte-Kinast oversaw the government's response to a 2022 outbreak of the African swine fever virus in the state, which is Germany's most important pig rearing region.

Otte-Kinast was nominated by her party as delegate to the Federal Convention for the purpose of electing the President of Germany in 2022.
