= Cabinet Weil I =

State government of Power Saxony

First Cabinet of Stephan Weil Cabinet Weil I
- 27th Cabinet of Lower Saxony
- 19 February 2013 – 22 November 2017
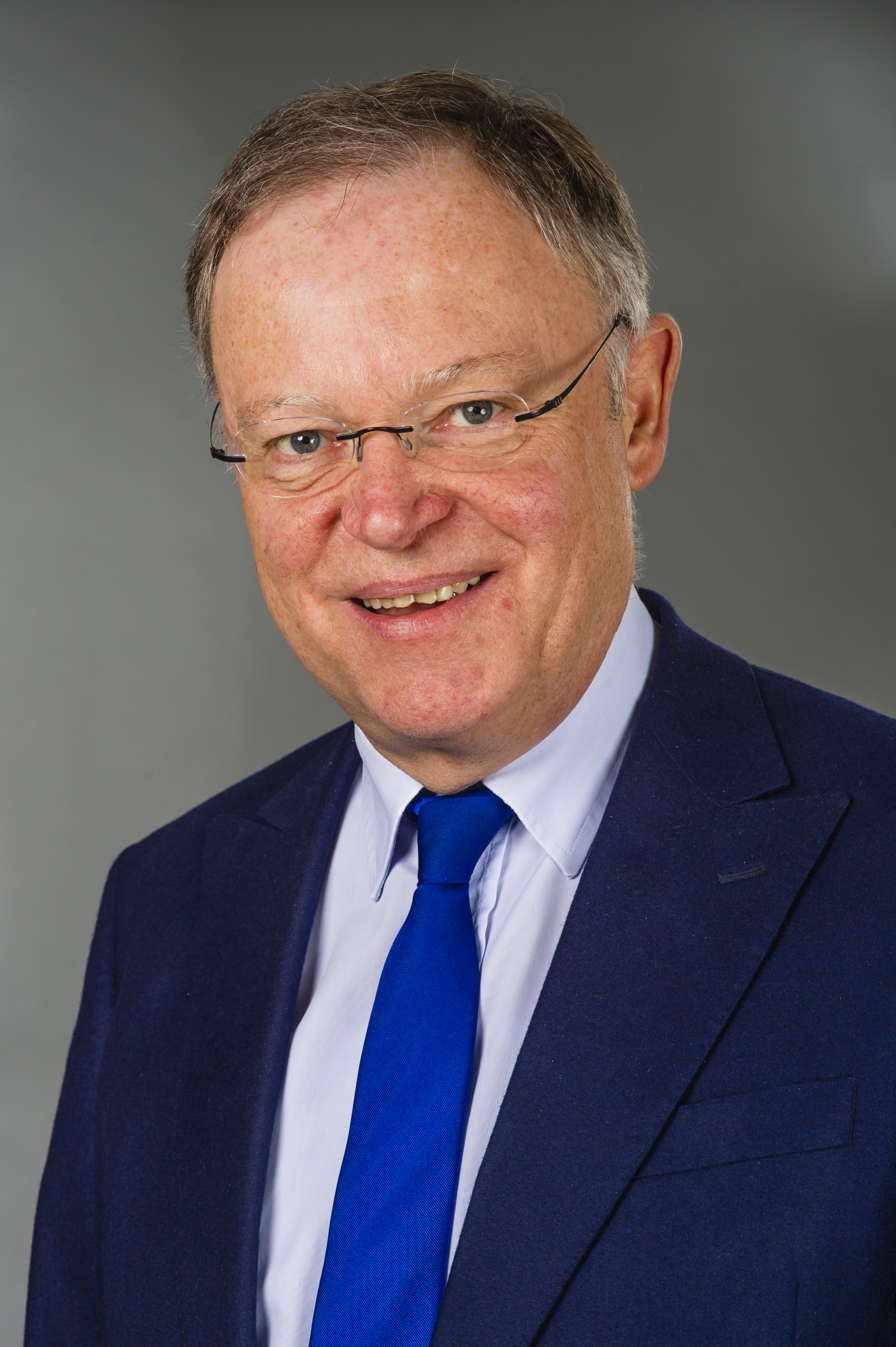
- Stephan Weil in February 2018
- Date formed: 19 February 2013
- Date dissolved: 22 November 2017 (4 years, 9 months and 3 days)

People and organisations
- Chancellor: Angela Merkel
- Minister President: Stephan Weil
- Deputy Minister President: Stefan Wenzel
- Member party: Social Democratic Party; Alliance 90/The Greens
- Status in legislature: Coalition government (Majority)
- Opposition party: Christian Democratic Union; Free Democratic Party
- Opposition leader: Christian Democratic Union

History
- Election: 2013 Lower Saxony state election
- Legislature term: 17th Landtag of Lower Saxony
- Predecessor: Cabinet McAllister
- Successor: Cabinet Weil II

The Cabinet Weil I was the state government of the German state of Lower Saxony from 19 February 2013 until 22 November 2017. The Cabinet was headed by Minister President Stephan Weil and was formed by the Social Democratic Party and the Alliance '90/The Greens, after Weil's winning of the 2013 Lower Saxony state election. On 19 February 2013, Weil was elected and sworn in as Minister President by the Landtag of Lower Saxony.

At the beginning of August 2017, the government lost its one-vote majority when Elke Twesten, a member of the Greens, left the parliamentary group. On 7 August 2017, the represented in the state parliament agreed on October 15, 2017 as the election date for a new state elections. The cabinet was succeeded by Weils's second cabinet.

== Composition ==
Portfolio	Minister	Took office	Left office	Party
Minister President	Stephan Weil	19 February 2013	22 November 2017	SPD
Deputy Minister President & Environment and Climate Protection	Stefan Wenzel	19 February 2013	22 November 2017	Greens
Minister of the Interior and Sports	Boris Pistorius	19 February 2013	22 November 2017	SPD
Minister of Finance	Peter-Jürgen Schneider	19 February 2013	22 November 2017	SPD
Minister of Justice	Antje Niewisch-Lennartz	19 February 2013	22 November 2017	Greens
Minister of Social Affairs, Health, and Equalization	Cornelia Rundt	19 February 2013	22 November 2017	SPD
Minister of Science and Culture	Gabriele Heinen-Kljajic	19 February 2013	22 November 2017	Greens
Minister of Economics, Labour and Transport	Olaf Lies	19 February 2013	22 November 2017	SPD
Minister of Food, Agriculture, Consumer Protection and Regional Development	Christian Meyer	19 February 2013	22 November 2017	Greens
