= Birgit Honé =

Minister of Federal and European Affairs and Regional Development

Birgit Honé MdL MdBR
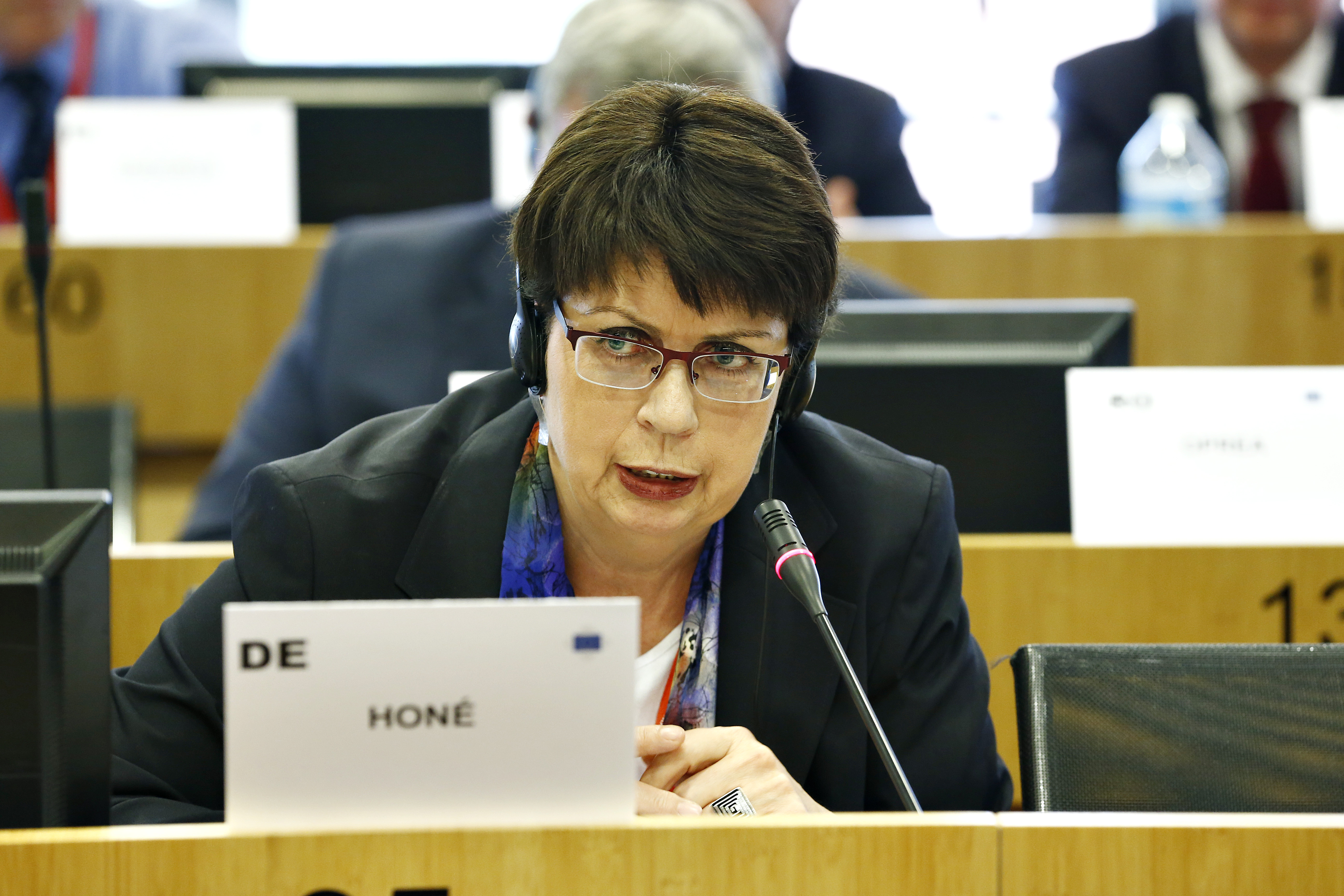
- Honé in 2018

Minister of Federal and European Affairs and Regional Development
- In office 22 November 2017 – 8 November 2022
- Preceded by: Wolfgang Senff
- Succeeded by: Wiebke Osigus

Member of the European Committee of the Regions
- Incumbent
- Assumed office 15 November 2013

Personal details
- Born: 8 November 1960 (age 65) Bad Schwartau, West Germany (now Germany)
- Party: Social Democratic Party
- Children: 1

Birgit Honé (born 8 November 1960) is a German politician of the Social Democratic Party (SPD) who served as Minister of Federal and European Affairs and Regional Development in the state government of Minister-President Stephan Weil of Lower Saxony from 2017 to 2022. In this capacity, was also a member of the German Bundesrat.

== Career in the public sector ==
From 1999 to 2002, Honé worked at the State Chancellery. Appointed by Minister-President Sigmar Gabriel, she later served as district president of Lüneburg from 2002 until 2004.

From 2004 to 2013, Honé served as a member of the Senate of the Lower Saxony State Audit Office. In this capacity, she was responsible for auditing the annual budgets of the State Ministry of the Interior (2004–2013), the State Ministry of the Environment (2004–2010), the State Ministry of Agriculture (2004–2010) and the Office for the Protection of the Constitution (2004–2013).

== Political career ==
Ahead of the 2013 state elections, Stephan Weil included Honé in his shadow cabinet for the Social Democrats’ campaign to unseat incumbent Minister President David McAllister.

As one of the state's representatives at the Bundesrat from 2017 to 2022, Honé was a member of the Committee on Foreign Affairs and the Committee on European Affairs. She was also a member of the German-French Friendship Group set up by the German Bundesrat and the French Senate. In addition, she was a member of the European Committee of the Regions (CoR).

Honé was nominated by her party as delegate to the Federal Convention for the purpose of electing the President of Germany in 2022.

Also in 2022, Honé was part of the Hannover SPD's three-member arbitration committee that decided that former Chancellor Gerhard Schröder had not violated any party rules by maintaining close ties to the Russian government and would be allowed to remain a party member.

== Other activities ==
- Business Forum of the Social Democratic Party of Germany, Member of the Political Advisory Board
- Foundation "Remembrance, Responsibility and Future“ (EVZ), Deputy Member of the Board of Trustees
