= Carola Reimann =

German politician (born 1967)

- Reimann in 2019

Minister for Social Affairs, Health and Equality of Lower Saxony
- In office 22 November 2017 – 1 March 2021
- Minister-President: Stephan Weil
- Preceded by: Cornelia Rundt
- Succeeded by: Daniela Behrens

Member of the Bundestag
- In office 22 February 2000 – 21 November 2017
- Preceded by: Ernst Schwanhold
- Succeeded by: Marja-Liisa Völlers
- Constituency: Stadt Osnabrück (2000–2002); Braunschweig (2002–2017)

Personal details
- Born: 25 August 1967 (age 59) Goch, West Germany
- Party: Social Democratic
- Education: TU Braunschweig

Carola Reimann (born 25 August 1967) is a German politician of the Social Democratic Party (SPD) who served as State Minister for Social Affairs, Health, and Equality in the cabinet of Minister-President Stephan Weil of Lower Saxony from 2017 to 2021. She previously represented Braunschweig in the Bundestag from 2002 until 2017.

== Early life and education ==
Reimann has a doctorate in biotechnology from Technical University of Braunschweig.

== Political career ==
=== Career in national politics ===
In parliament, Reimann was a member of the Committee on Health (2000–2013) and the Committee on the Environment, Nature Conservation and Nuclear Safety (2000–2002). She served as her parliamentary group's spokesperson on health policy from 2005 until 2009.

From 2008 until 2017, Reimann was part of the leadership team of the SPD in Lower Saxony, under successive chairs Garrelt Duin (2007–2010), Olaf Lies (2010–2012) and Stephan Weil (2012–2017). Ahead of the 2009 elections, German foreign minister Frank-Walter Steinmeier included her in his shadow cabinet of 10 women and eight men for the Social Democrats' campaign to unseat Chancellor Angela Merkel.

Following the 2009 elections, Reimann chaired the Committee on Health from 2009 to 2013.

In the negotiations to form a Grand Coalition of Chancellor Angela Merkel's Christian Democrats (CDU together with the Bavarian CSU) and the SPD following the 2013 federal elections, Reimann was part of the SPD delegation in the working group on health policy, led by Jens Spahn and Karl Lauterbach. From 2013, she served as deputy chair of the SPD parliamentary group, under the leadership of chair Thomas Oppermann. During her time in office, she notably led a cross-party initiative in 2015 for legislation on assisted suicide meant to absolve doctors from prosecution, alongside Peter Hintze and Lauterbach.

=== Career in state politics ===
In November 2017, Reimann resigned from parliament to accept her appointment as State Minister for Social Affairs, Health, and Equality in the cabinet of Minister-President Stephan Weil of Lower Saxony. In this capacity, she was also one of the state's representatives on the Bundesrat.

In the negotiations to form a coalition government under the leadership of Chancellor Angela Merkel following the 2017 federal elections, Reimann was again part of the working group on health policy, this time led by Hermann Gröhe, Georg Nüßlein and Malu Dreyer.

In March 2021, Reimann resigned from her office, citing health reasons.

== Later career ==
Since 2021, Reimann has been working as chair of German health insurance AOK.

== Other activities ==
- Fraunhofer Institute for Surface Engineering and Thin Films (IST), Member of the Board of Trustees (since 2016)
