= Cabinet Weil II =

State government of Lower Saxony

Second Cabinet of Stephan Weil Weil II
- 29th Cabinet of Lower Saxony
- 22 November 2017 – 7 November 2022
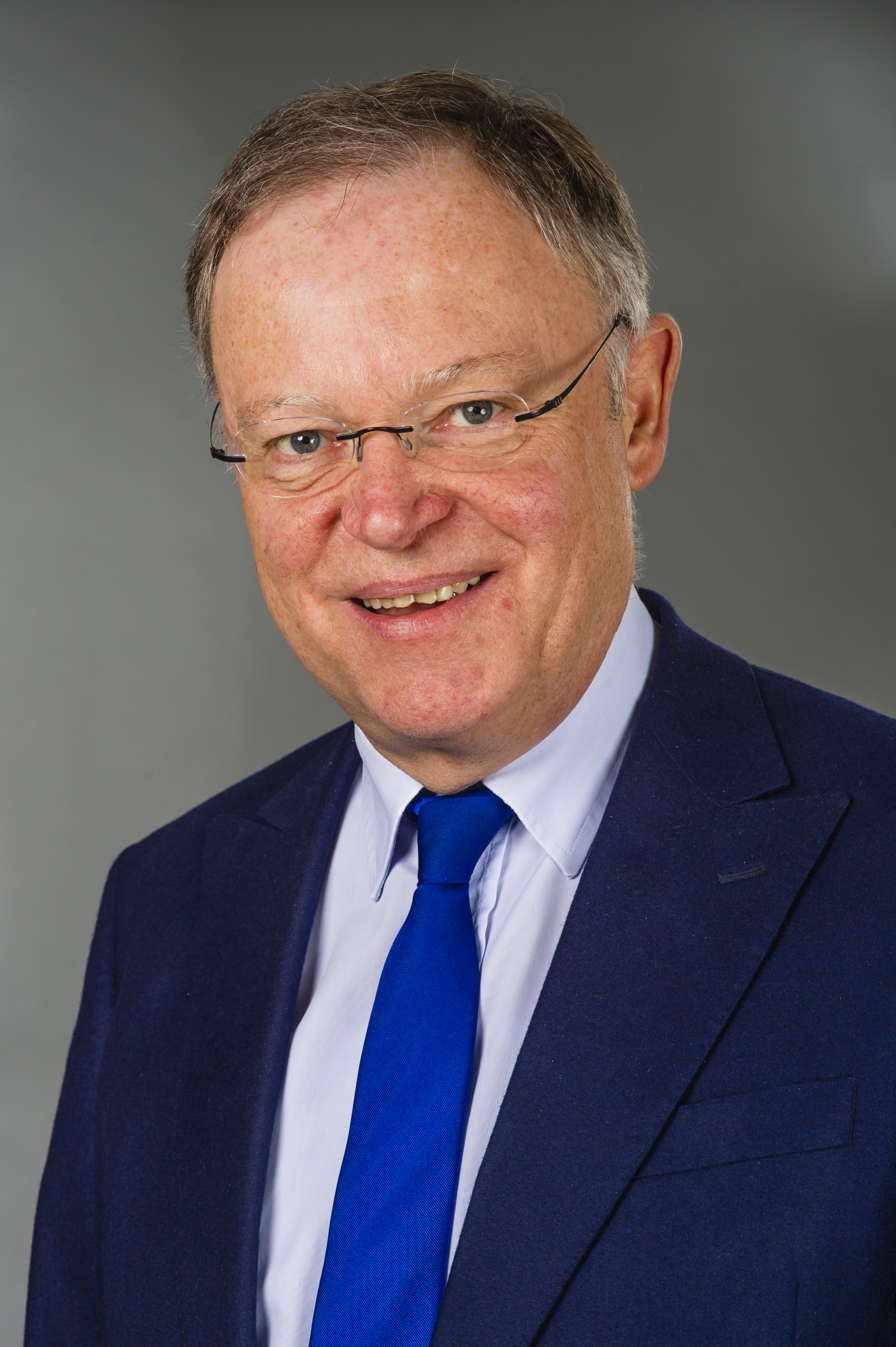
- Stephan Weil in February 2018
- Date formed: 22 November 2017
- Date dissolved: 7 November 2022

People and organisations
- Minister-President: Stephan Weil
- Deputy Minister-President: Bernd Althusmann
- No. of ministers: 10
- Member parties: Social Democratic Party; Christian Democratic Union
- Status in legislature: Grand coalition (Majority)
- Opposition parties: Alliance 90/The Greens; Free Democratic Party; Alternative for Germany

History
- Election: 2017 Lower Saxony state election
- Legislature term: 18th Landtag of Lower Saxony
- Predecessor: First Weil cabinet
- Successor: Third Weil cabinet

The second Weil cabinet was the state government of Lower Saxony between 2017 and 2022, sworn in on 22 November 2017 after Stephan Weil was elected as Minister-President of Lower Saxony by the members of the Landtag of Lower Saxony. It was the 29th Cabinet of Lower Saxony.

It was formed after the 2017 Lower Saxony state election by the Social Democratic Party (SPD) and Christian Democratic Union (CDU). Excluding the Minister-President, the cabinet comprised ten ministers. Five were members of the SPD and five were members of the CDU.

The second Weil cabinet was succeeded by the third Weil cabinet on 8 November 2022.

== Formation ==
The previous cabinet was a coalition government of the SPD and The Greens led by Minister-President Stephan Weil of the SPD.

The election took place on 15 October 2017, and resulted in a modest improvement for the SPD and losses for the Greens. The opposition CDU fell to second place behind the SPD. The FDP also took small losses, while the AfD debuted at 6%.

Overall, the incumbent coalition lost its majority as the decline in Greens support outweighed SPD gains. The FDP ruled out a coalition with the SPD and Greens while the Greens ruled out a coalition with the CDU and FDP, leaving a grand coalition of the SPD and CDU as the only practical option. The two parties agreed to begin discussions on 26 October. On 16 November, they announced that they had come to an agreement, which was approved by the SPD party congress two days later and the CDU congress on the 20th. It was formally signed the next day.

Weil was elected as Minister-President by the Landtag on 22 November 2017, winning 104 votes out of 137 cast.

== Composition ==
Portfolio	Minister	Party	Took office	Left office	State secretaries
Minister-President	Stephan Weil born 15 December 1958	SPD	22 November 2017	7 November 2022	Jörg Mielke (Head of the State Chancellery); Anke Pörksen (Speaker for the State Government)
Deputy Minister-President Minister for Economics, Labour, Transport and Digitalisation	Bernd Althusmann born 3 December 1966	CDU	22 November 2017	7 November 2022	Berend Lindner (Economics, Labour and Transport); Stefan Muhle (Digitalisation)
Minister for Interior and Sport	Boris Pistorius born 14 March 1960	SPD	22 November 2017	7 November 2022	Stephan Manke
Minister for Food, Agriculture and Consumer Protection	Barbara Otte-Kinast born 18 September 1964	CDU	22 November 2017	7 November 2022	Ludwig Theuvsen
Minister for Finance	Reinhold Hilbers born 25 July 1964	CDU	22 November 2017	7 November 2022	Doris Nordmann
Minister for Justice	Barbara Havliza born 13 March 1958	CDU	22 November 2017	7 November 2022	Frank-Thomas Hett
Minister for Education	Grant Hendrik Tonne born 22 June 1976	SPD	22 November 2017	7 November 2022	Gaby Willamowius
Minister for Science and Culture	Björn Thümler born 22 November 1970	CDU	22 November 2017	7 November 2022	Sabine Johannsen
Minister for Environment, Energy, Construction and Climate Protection	Olaf Lies born 8 May 1967	SPD	22 November 2017	7 November 2022	Frank Doods
Minister of Social Affairs, Health, and Equality	Carola Reimann born 25 August 1967	SPD	22 November 2017	1 March 2021	Heiger Scholz
Minister of Social Affairs, Health, and Equality	Daniela Behrens born 12 May 1968	SPD	5 March 2021	7 November 2022	Heiger Scholz
Minister for Federal and European Affairs and Regional Development	Birgit Honé born 8 November 1960	SPD	22 November 2017	7 November 2022	Matthias Wunderling-Weilbier
