= Reinhold Hilbers =

German businessman and politician

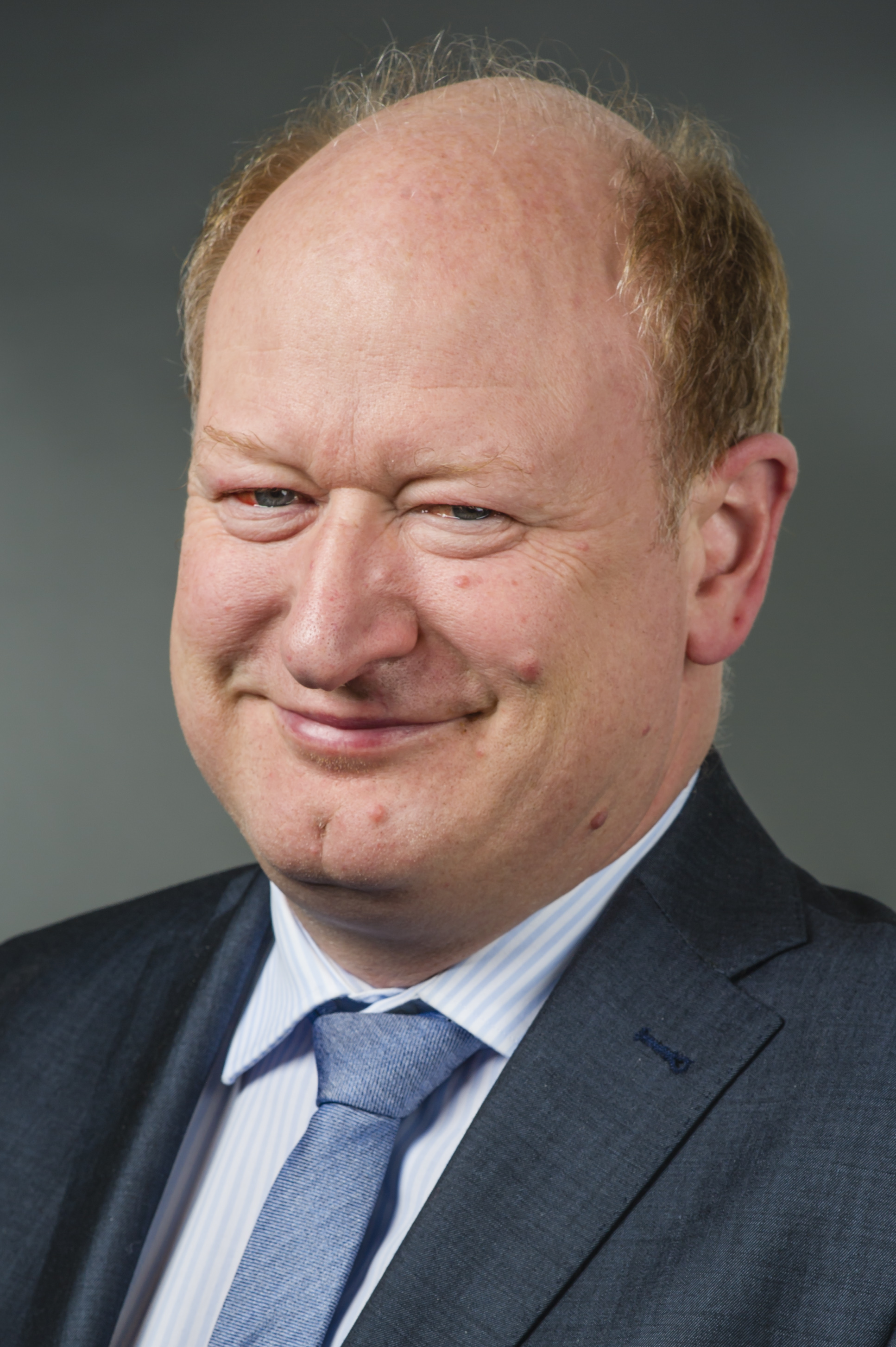
- Reinhold Hilbers

Minister of Finance of Lower Saxony
- In office 21 November 2017 – 8 November 2022
- Preceded by: Peter-Jürgen Schneider
- Succeeded by: Gerald Heere

Personal details
- Born: 25 July 1964 (age 62) Lingen, Lower Saxony, West Germany (now Germany)
- Occupation: German businessman and politician

Reinhold Hilbers (born 25 July 1964 in Lingen) is a German businessman and politician of the Christian Democratic Union (CDU) who has been a member of the State Parliament of Lower Saxony since March 2003. From 2017 to 2022, served as State Minister of Finance in the government of Minister-President Stephan Weil.

== Early life and career ==
After training in the wholesale and export business, Hilbers completed military service in the Bundeswehr. Then, he studied economics at the Osnabrück University of Applied Sciences. Between 1993 and 1999, he worked at a local bank. From 1999 he served as managing director of Lebenshilfe Nordhorn GmbH.

== Political career ==
Hilbers became a member of the CDU in 1988. At present he is chairman of the CDU district of Grafschaft Bentheim.

Since the 2003 state elections, Hilbers has been a member of the State Parliament of Lower Saxony. He was elected with 72.2% of the votes to represent his constituency in parliament. In the 2008 state elections, he obtained 55.6% of the votes. From 2013 until 2017, he served as deputy chairman of the CDU parliamentary group.

In 2017, Bernd Althusmann included Hilbers in his shadow cabinet for the Christian Democrats’ campaign to unseat incumbent Minister-President Stephan Weil; during the campaign, he was in charge of social policy issues. Hilbers eventually became State Minister of Finance. In this capacity, he was one of the state's representatives at the Bundesrat, where he served on the Finance Committee.

Hilbers was nominated by his party as delegate to the Federal Convention for the purpose of electing the President of Germany in 2022.

== Other activities ==
=== Regulatory agencies ===
- Stability Council, Ex-Officio Member (2017–2022)

=== Corporate boards ===
- Deutsche Messe AG, Member of the Advisory Board
- Bentheimer Eisenbahn AG, Chairman of the supervisory board (since 2017)
- KfW, Member of the Board of Supervisory Directors
- Norddeutsche Landesbank (NORD/LB), Ex-Officio Chairman of the supervisory board (since 2017), previously Member of the Advisory Board
- Salzgitter AG, Ex-Officio Member of the Supervisory Board

=== Non-profit organizations ===
- Max Planck Society, Member of the Senate
