= Barbara Havliza =

German judge and politician

Barbara Havliza (born 13 March 1958 in Dortmund) is a German judge and politician of the Christian Democratic Union (CDU) who has been serving as State Minister of Justice in the government of Minister President Stephan Weil of Lower Saxony since November 2017.

== Early life and education ==
Havliza attended the Mallinckrodt-Gymnasium in her hometown and graduated in 1976. She then studied law at the Wilhelms-Universität in Münster.

== Early career ==
After her legal clerkship, Havliza worked as a lawyer in Osnabrück and, from 1987 onwards, as a judge and prosecutor in the district courts of Oldenburg and Osnabrück. In 1995, she was a member of the III. Grand Criminal Division of the district court of Osnabrück, which sentenced Bernhard M. to 4 1/2 years' imprisonment for rape of his niece in four cases, in spite of his declarations of innocence. After the convict had served his sentence in full, this verdict was overturned in the context of a retrial by the Oldenburg district court due to flagrant deficiencies that had already become evident during the original court hearings, and Bernhard M. was rehabilitated (in the so-called miscarriage of justice of Adolf S. and Bernhard M.). In an interview with the Süddeutsche Zeitung, Havliza commented retrospectively: "This shows how fallible one is, which is why I am convinced that it would be better to acquit one unjustly than to convict one wrongfully."

In 2001, Havliza was appointed presiding judge at the Regional Court of Osnabrück and, among other things, was a chairwoman of a jury court there. In this capacity, she was also involved with biker gang crime. In 2007, she became director of the district court of Bersenbrück.

Between 2007 and 2017, Havliza was a judge at the Higher Regional Court of Düsseldorf in a Senate for terrorism and organized crime (Staatsschutz), also as its chairwoman from 2010. In 2012, she succeeded Ottmar Breidling as chairwoman of the prestigious sixth Staatsschutz Senate. In her time as chairwoman, Havliza led several important trials, such as those against the alleged al-Qaida terrorists of the "Düsseldorf Cell," against the would-be assassin of Cologne Mayor Henriette Reker, and against a Syria returnee from the Lohberger Brigade. The first time the sixth Senate convicted the wife of a jihadist for supporting a terrorist group, was under the chairmanship of Havliza. As an assessor, Havliza had already convicted the members of the so-called Sauerland Group in 2010. Havliza was the target of death threats from the Islamist spectrum multiple times.

Media observers described Havliza's trials as efficient and with a good sense of the feelings of the defendants. Her judgments were rated as rather hard.

== Political career ==
In the election campaign before the 2017 Lower Saxony state election, Havliza belonged to the shadow cabinet of the CDU. After the election and the coalition negotiations with the SPD, she was nominated by Bernd Althusmann as Minister of Justice in the new grand coalition and took office on 22 November 2017. As one of the state's representatives at the Bundesrat, she also serves on the Committee on Legal Affairs.

Havliza supports, among other things, more security in the courts, a ban on religious symbols in the judicial bench, faster procedures in juvenile criminal law, and the restriction of full-scale veiling in court. She is one of the first judiciary politicians in Germany who also advocates a legal review of the so-called abuse study of the Catholic Church published in September 2018.

In September 2018 Havliza was elected treasurer of the CDU in Lower Saxony with 94.7 percent approval.

In November 2021, Havliza announced that she would not stand in the 2022 state elections.

== Other activities ==
- German Forum for Crime Prevention (DFK), Ex-Officio Member of the Board of Trustees (since 2017)

== Personal life ==
Havliza is Catholic, married, and has two children.
