= Kathrin Wahlmann =

German politician (born 1977)

Minister of Justice of Lower Saxony
- Incumbent
- Assumed office 8 November 2022
- Minister-President: Stephan Weil; Olaf Lies
- Preceded by: Barbara Havliza

Personal details
- Born: 4 August 1977 (age 48)
- Party: Social Democratic Party (since 1996)

Kathrin Wahlmann (née Rühl; born 4 August 1977) is a German politician serving as minister of justice of Lower Saxony since 2022. From 2013 to 2017, she was a member of the Landtag of Lower Saxony.
