= 2027 Lower Saxony state election =

Upcoming German state election

- 26 September 2027

All 135 seats in the Landtag of Lower Saxony 74 seats needed for a majority
Party	SPD	CDU
Last election	57 seats, 33.4%	47 seats, 28.1%
Current seats	57	47
Party	Greens	AfD
Last election	24 seats, 14.5%	18 seats, 11.0%
Current seats	24	16
Incumbent Government
Lies Cabinet
SPD–Green

The next Lower Saxony state election is scheduled for 26 September 2027 at the regular end of the legislative period. A new electoral map in Lower Saxony is being introduced, increasing the number of state constituencies from 87 to 90.

== Opinion polling ==
=== Graphical summary ===
Local regression of polls conducted

=== Party polling ===
Polling firm	Fieldwork date	Sample size	SPD	CDU	Grüne	AfD	FDP	Linke	BSW	Others	Lead
Infratest dimap	12–17 Nov 2026	1,000	27	21	15	21	4	5	–	7	6
INSA	1–8 Sep 2026	1,000	26	22	15	21	5	6	3	2	4
INSA	14–21 Apr 2026	1,000	25	25	12	20	4	7	3	4	Tie
Allensbach	12–29 Jan 2026	1,064	26	27	10	21	3	7	–	6	1
Infratest dimap	12–17 Nov 2025	1,156	26	26	12	20	3	6	3	4	Tie
Federal election	23 Feb 2025	–	23.0	28.1	11.5	17.8	4.1	8.1	3.8	3.6	5.1
INSA	10–17 Feb 2025	1,000	25	30	10	16	5	5	5	4	5
Allensbach	11–29 Nov 2024	1,007	27	33	10	16	4	–	4	6	6
INSA	4–11 Nov 2024	1,000	26	31	10	15	4	2	6	5	5
Infratest dimap	31 Oct–6 Nov 2024	1,159	25	32	12	15	–	–	4	12	7
EP election	9 Jun 2024	–	19.5	31.4	12.2	13.2	5.3	2.1	4.5	11.8	11.9
Allensbach	19 Dec–12 Jan 2024	1,070	29	30	11	21	4	2	–	3	1
Infratest dimap	6–11 Nov 2023	1,178	26	28	13	18	5	–	–	10	2
INSA	9–16 Oct 2023	1,000	27	29	13	17	4	3	–	7	2
Allensbach	15–30 Jun 2023	1,101	32	29	13	14	5	3	–	4	3
Forsa	1–8 Feb 2023	2,007	33	26	17	10	5	3	–	6	7
2022 state election	9 Oct 2022	–	33.4	28.1	14.5	11.0	4.7	2.7	–	5.6	3.3
