= Björn Thümler =

Lower Saxony Minister for Science and Culture

Björn Thümler MdL MdBR
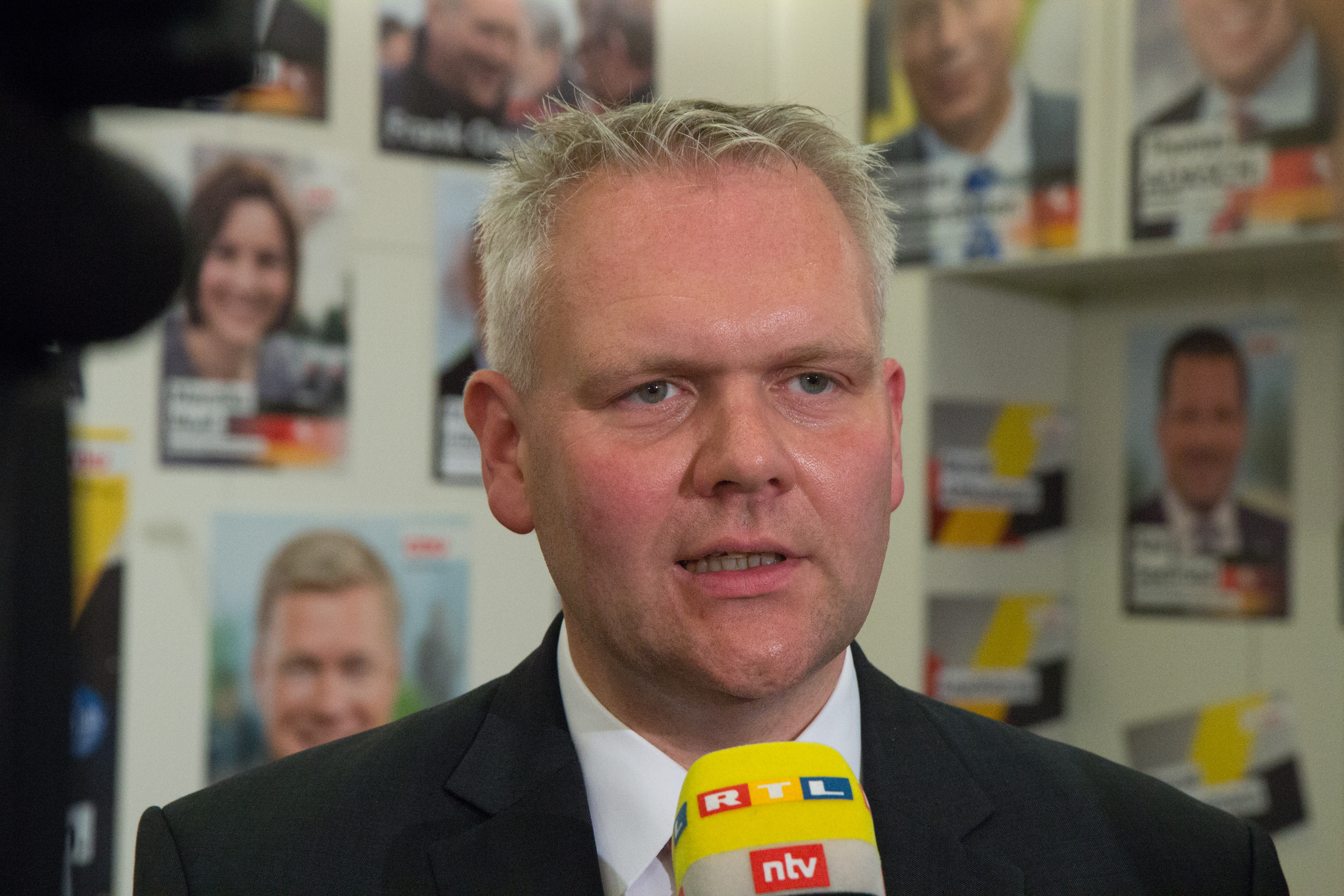
- Thümler in 2017

Lower Saxony Minister for Science and Culture
- In office 22 November 2017 – 8 November 2022
- Preceded by: Gabriele Heinen-Kljajic
- Succeeded by: Falko Mohrs

Personal details
- Born: 22 November 1970 (age 55) Brake, West Germany
- Party: Christian Democratic Union
- Spouse: Christina Debus (m. 2004)
- Children: 1
- Education: University of Hanover (MA), University of Oldenburg
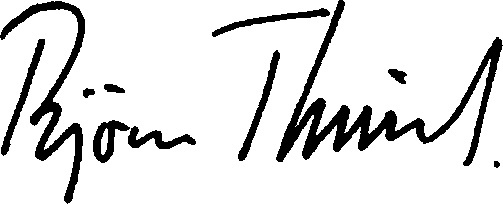
- Signature
- Website: bjoern-thuemler.de

Military service
- Allegiance: Germany
- Branch/service: Bundeswehr
- Years of service: 1990–1991

Björn Thümler (pronounced [bjœʁn tyːmlaː]; born 22 November 1970) is a German politician of the Christian Democratic Union (CDU) who served as Minister for Science and Culture for Lower Saxony from 2017 to 2022. Thümler has been a part of the Landtag of Lower Saxony since 2003. As minister, he also was a member of the German Bundesrat from 2017 to 2022.

== Early life and education ==
Thümler was born in Brake and grew up in the municipality Berne where he went to Kindergarten and Primary school. From 1990 Thümler did his Grundwehrdienst in the 11th Panzergrenadier Division in Oldenburg until 1991. Thümler got his Abitur at the Gymnasium Brake in 1990. From 1991 he studied political science at the University of Hanover and history at the University of Oldenburg until 2000.

== Political career ==
=== Early beginnings ===
Thümler became a member of the Junge Union in 1986 and was chairman for the Wesermarsch district from 1990 until 1996.

=== Landtag of Lower Saxony ===
Thümler has been a part of the Landtag of Lower Saxony since 2003 for the district of Wesermarsch.

=== State Minister for Science and Culture, 2017–present ===
Thümler was appointed by Bernd Althusmann as Lower Saxony Minister for Science and Culture on 22 November 2017. He appointed his state secretary Sabine Johannsen on the same day.

Thümler was nominated by his party as delegate to the Federal Convention for the purpose of electing the President of Germany in 2022.

== Other activities ==
- Leibniz Association, Ex-Officio Member of the Senate (since 2021)
- Braunschweigische Stiftung, Member of the Board of Trustees
- Cultural Foundation of the German States (KdL), Member of the Council
- Deutsches Museum, Member of the Board of Trustees
- Volkswagen Foundation, Chair of the Board of Trustees
- Max Planck Institute for Biophysical Chemistry, Member of the Board of Trustees
- Max Planck Institute for Dynamics and Self-Organization, Member of the Board of Trustees
- NORD/LB Kulturstiftung, Member of the Board of Trustees (2017–2022)
- Stiftung Lesen, Member of the Board of Trustees

== Honors ==
On November 26, 2020, the University of Glasgow awarded Thümler the title of Dr. h.c.

== Personal life ==
Thümler is married to Christina Debus and has one daughter.
