= Gerald Heere =

German politician (born 1979)

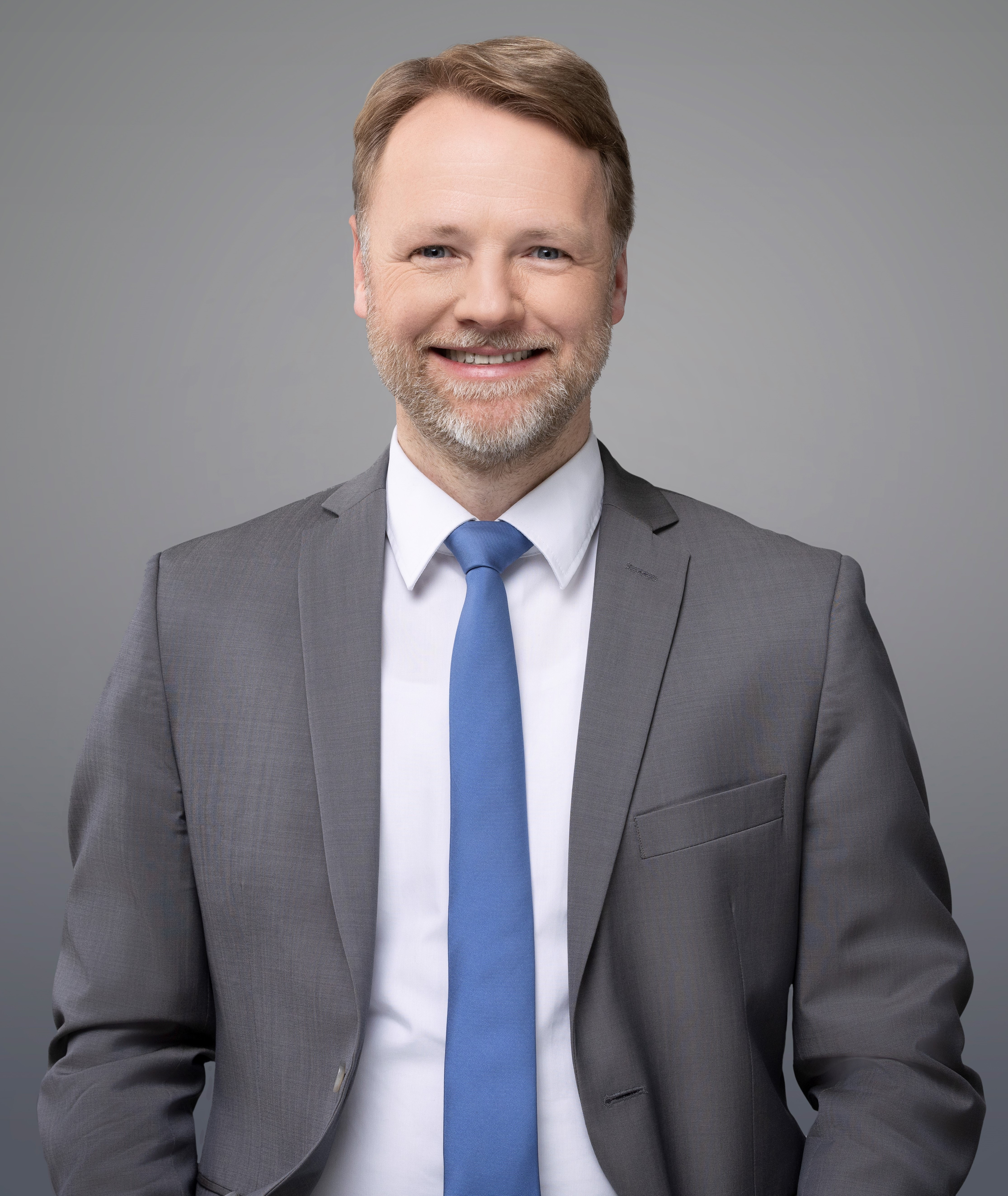
- Heere in 2023

Minister of Finance of Lower Saxony
- Incumbent
- Assumed office 8 November 2022
- Minister-President: Stephan Weil; Olaf Lies
- Preceded by: Reinhold Hilbers

Personal details
- Born: 18 April 1979 (age 47) Siegburg, West Germany (now Germany)
- Party: Alliance 90/The Greens (since 2005)
- Education: TU Braunschweig

Gerald Heere (born 18 April 1979 in Siegburg) is a German politician of the Green Party who has been serving as State Minister of Finance in the governments of successive Ministers-President Stephan Weil and Olaf Lies of Lower Saxony since 2022.

== Political career ==
Heere was a member of the State Parliament of Lower Saxony from 2013 to 2017 and from 2021 to 2022.

== Other activities ==
- KfW, Member of the Board of Supervisory Directors (since 2023)
- NORD/LB, Ex-Officio Chair of the supervisory board (since 2022)

== Personal life ==
Heere is married and has two sons. The family lives in Hanover.
