= Gabriele Heinen-Kljajić =

German politician (born 1962)

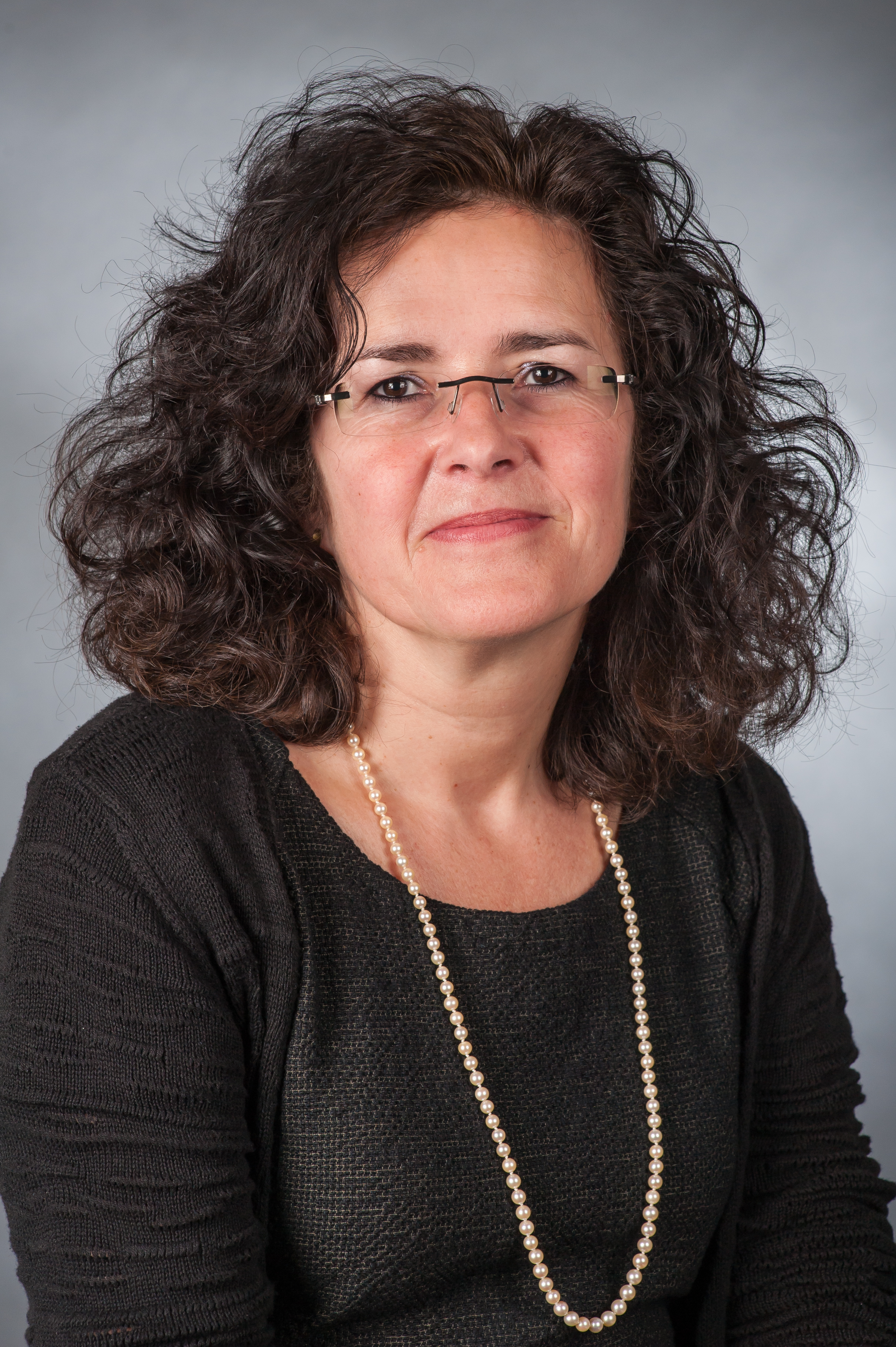
Gabriele Heinen-Kljajić (2013)

Gabriele Heinen-Kljajić (born 28 May 1962, Gemünd) is a German politician for the Alliance '90/The Greens.

== Political career ==
Heinen-Kljajić was elected to the Lower Saxon Landtag in 2003 state elections, and has been re-elected in 2008 and 2013. On February 19, 2013, she was sworn in as State Minister for Science and Culture in the government of Minister-President Stephan Weil. As one of her state's representatives at the Bundesrat, she served on the Committee on Cultural Affairs.

When the Green Party had to leave the coalition government following the 2017 state elections, Heinen-Kljajić was succeeded by Björn Thümler.

== Other activities ==
- Volkswagen Foundation, Chairwoman of the Board of Trustees
- Deutsches Museum, Member of the Board of Trustees
- Max Planck Institute for Biophysical Chemistry, Member of the Board of Trustees
- Max Planck Institute for Dynamics and Self-Organization, Member of the Board of Trustees
- Niedersächsische Staatstheater Hannover, Ex-Officio Chairwoman of the Supervisory Board (2013-2017)
- Staatstheater Braunschweig, Ex-Officio Chairwoman of the Supervisory Board (2013-2017)
- Oldenburgisches Staatstheater, Ex-Officio Chairwoman of the Supervisory Board (2013-2017)
