= Miriam Staudte =

German politician

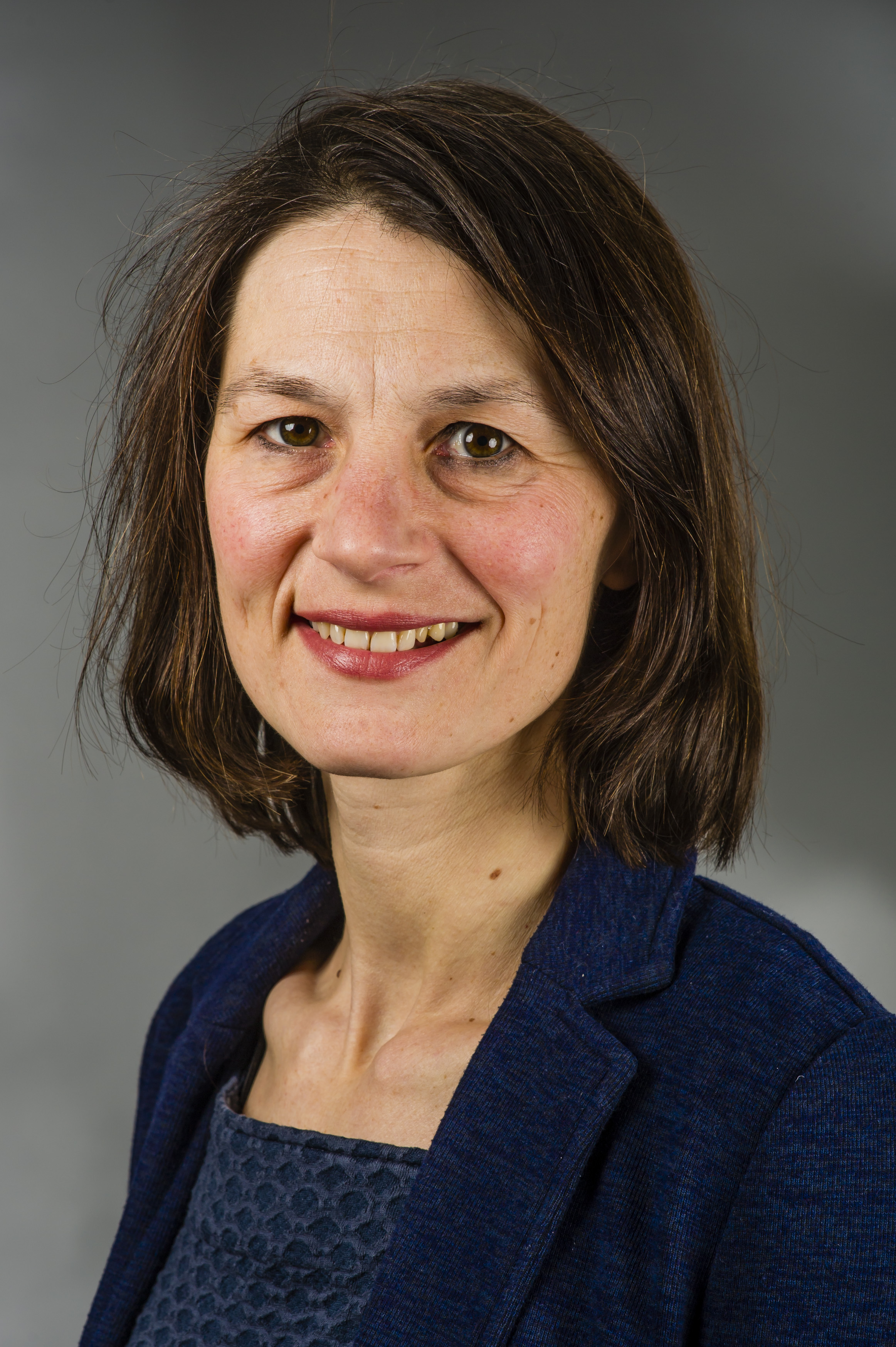

Minister of Food, Agriculture and Consumer Protection of Lower Saxony
- Incumbent
- Assumed office 8 November 2022
- Preceded by: Barbara Otte-Kinast

Personal details
- Born: 4 November 1975 (age 51) Kiel, West Germany
- Party: Alliance '90/The Greens
- Children: 2

Miriam Staudte (born 4 November 1975) is a German politician for the Alliance '90/The Greens who has been serving as State Minister of Food, Agriculture and Consumer Protection in the cabinet of Minister-President Stephan Weil of Lower Saxony since 2022. From 2008 to 2022, she was a member of the State Parliament of Lower Saxony.

== Live ==
Miriam Staude was born 1975 in Kiel. From 1981, the family lived in Geesthacht. Her father is active in NABU. From 1996 to 2001, Staudte studied social work at the University of Applied Sciences North-East Lower Saxony in Lüneburg, graduating with degrees in social pedagogy and social work. Between 2002 and 2003, she completed her professional recognition year working as a social worker at the Johanniter Hospital in Geesthacht. From 2003 to 2008, she took a leave of absence for child-rearing.

She has been a member of the Alliance 90/The Greens since 1993. From 2001 to 2016, she served as a member of the Lüneburg District Council (Kreistag), acting as chair of the Alliance 90/The Greens parliamentary group from 2004 to 2008.

Between 2006 and 2008, she was a council member for the Scharnebeck joint municipality (Samtgemeinde). From 2008 to 2022, she served as a member of the State Parliament of Lower Saxony (Landtag) and as deputy chair of the Alliance 90/The Greens parliamentary group. From 2021 to 2022, she was a member of the Lüchow-Dannenberg District Council.

As a member of parliament, she served as the agricultural policy spokesperson for A90/Greens. In 2022, she became Minister of Agriculture in the Weil cabinet.

In December 2024, "Land schafft Verbindung" (LsV) activists arrived at her private residence in the district of Lüchow-Dannenberg with around 30 tractors for a spontaneous demonstration. She was away at work in Hanover, and her two children were home alone.

She stated that the action taken in front of her private home is unacceptable. Demonstrating is fine, but not in this manner in front of her family home. She sees this as an attempt at intimidation.

== Referencesm ==
- "Miriam Staudte" (in German). Landtag of Lower Saxony.
