= Julia Hamburg =

German politician

Julia Hamburg MdL MdBR
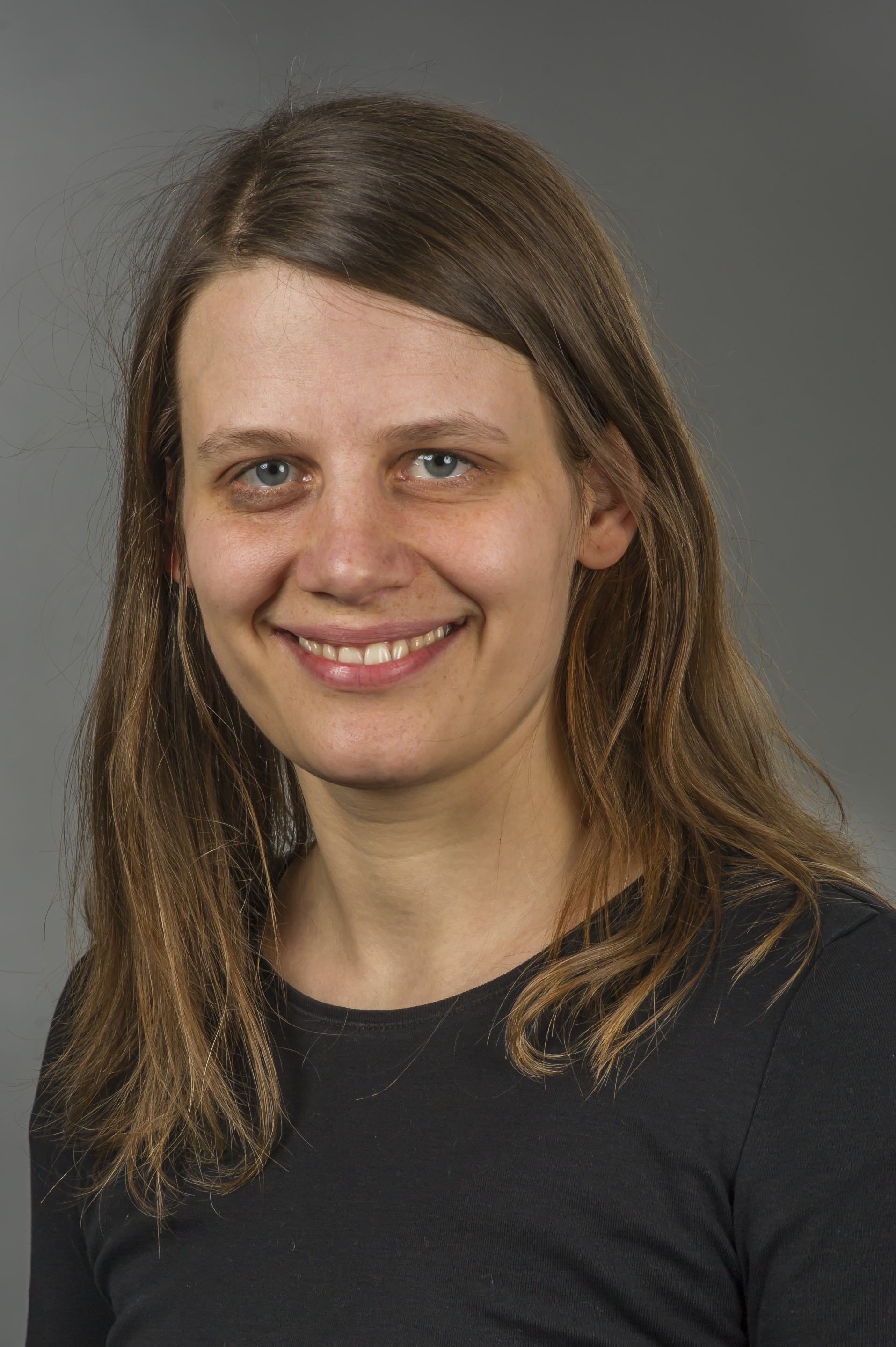

Deputy Minister-President of Lower-Saxony
- Incumbent
- Assumed office 8 November 2022
- Minister-President: Stephan Weil; Olaf Lies
- Preceded by: Bernd Althusmann

Julia Willie Hamburg (born 26 June 1986) is a German politician of Alliance 90/The Greens, serving as the Deputy Minister-President of Lower Saxony and the State Minister for Education and Culture. Before that she served as the leader of the party's group in the State Parliament of Lower Saxony.

== Early life and education ==
Born and educated in Hanover, Hamburg studied political science, German philology and philosophy at the University of Göttingen. She finished her studies without a degree.

== Political career ==
Hamburg joined the Greens in 2007 and a year later became speaker of the youth wing of the party in the state of Lower Saxony. In 2011 she became deputy head of the party in the state. In the January 2013 election, she was elected to the state Landtag as its youngest member, and the following month was elected as joint state party head with Jan Haude. She withdrew from the party position a year later with pregnancy-related health problems; she resumed her seat in the Landtag in July 2014. In March 2020 she was chosen to head her party's delegation in the Landtag, becoming leader of the opposition.

=== Career in state government ===
In January 2022, the Greens declared Hamburg and Christian Meyer their lead candidates for the state election in October 2022. A misspelling of the state's name on her election posters attracted publicity. After a gain of seats in the election, the Greens formed a government in coalition with the Social Democrats.

As one of the state's representatives at the Bundesrat, Hamburg serves on the Committee on Education. She is also a member of the German-Polish Friendship Group set up in cooperation with the Senate of Poland.

== Other activities ==
- Volkswagen, Ex-Officio Member of the Supervisory Board (since 2022)
- FC St. Pauli, Member

== Personal life ==
Hamburg lives in Hanover with her partner; they have two children.
