= Wiebke Osigus =

German politician (born 1981)

Minister of Federal and European Affairs of Lower Saxony
- In office 8 November 2022 – 20 May 2025
- Minister-President: Stephan Weil
- Preceded by: Birgit Honé
- Succeeded by: Melanie Walter

Personal details
- Born: 27 June 1981 (age 44)
- Party: Social Democratic Party (since 2015)

Wiebke Osigus (born 27 June 1981) is a German politician serving as a member of the Landtag of Lower Saxony since 2017. From 2022 to 2025, she served as minister of federal and European affairs of Lower Saxony.
