= 2022 Lower Saxony state election =

State election in Lower Saxony, Germany

← 2017	9 October 2022	2027 →

All 146 seats in the Landtag of Lower Saxony, including 11 overhang and leveling seats 74 seats needed for a majority
- Turnout: 3,657,881 (60.3%) ▼2.8 pp
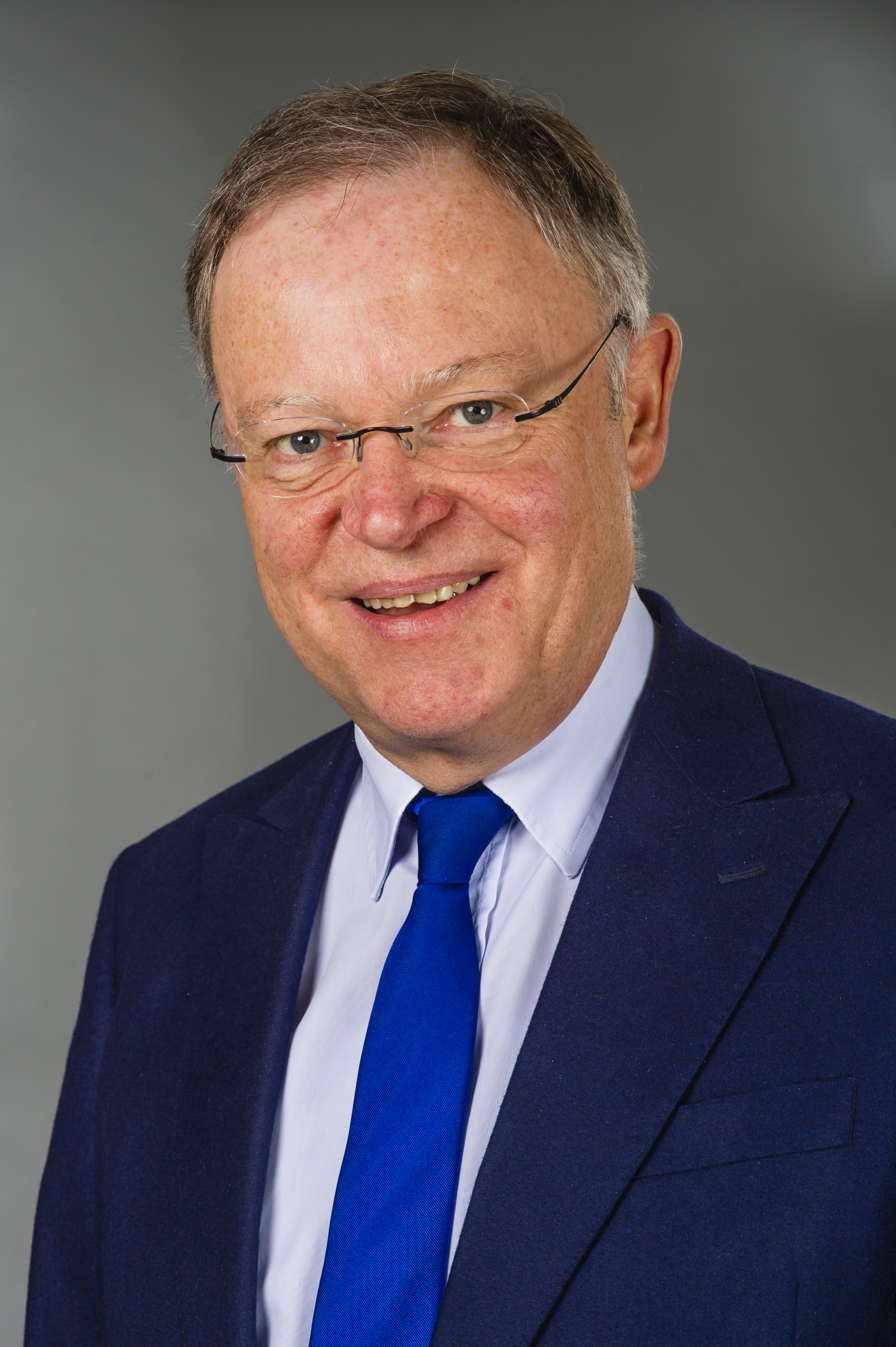

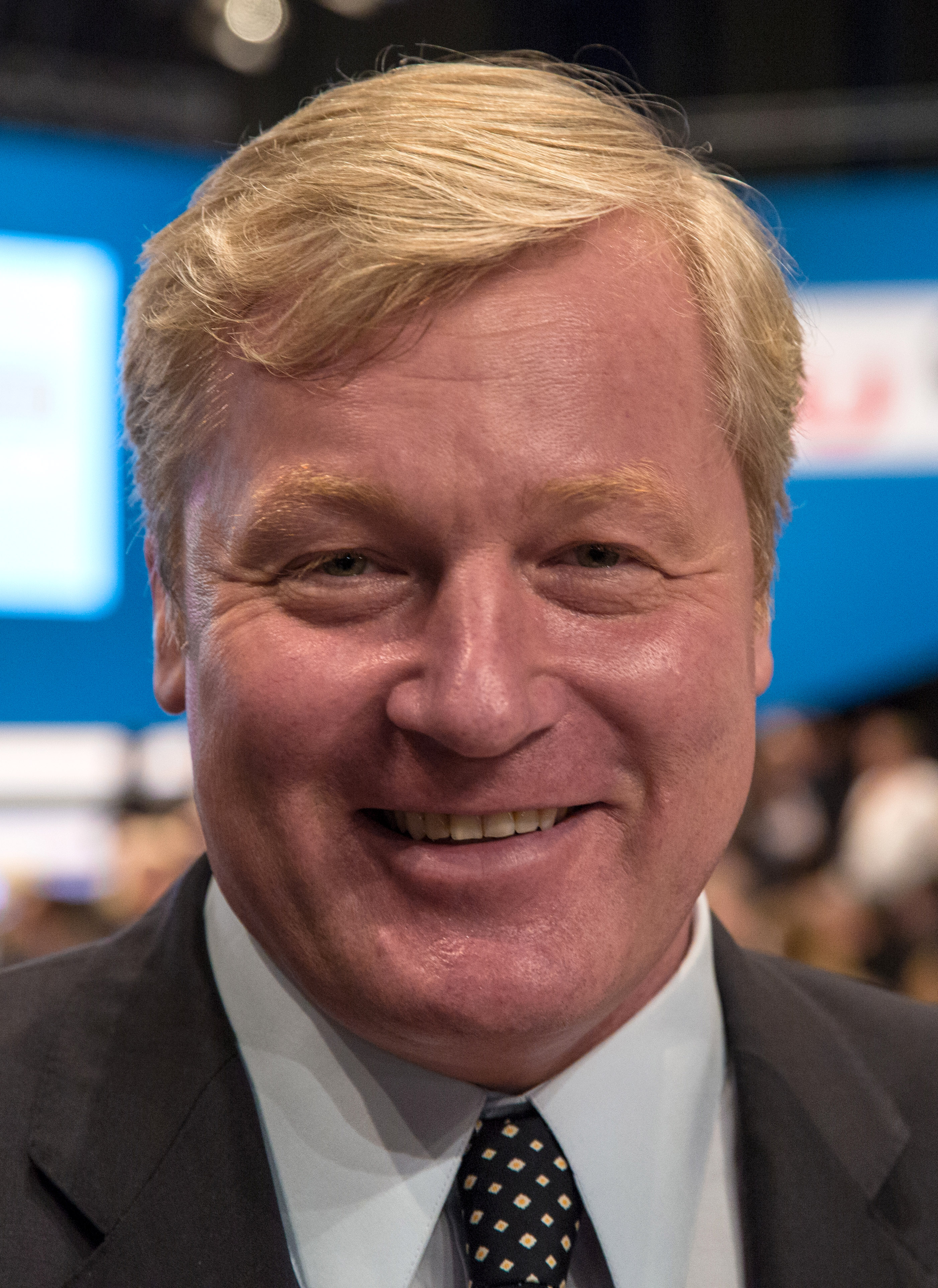

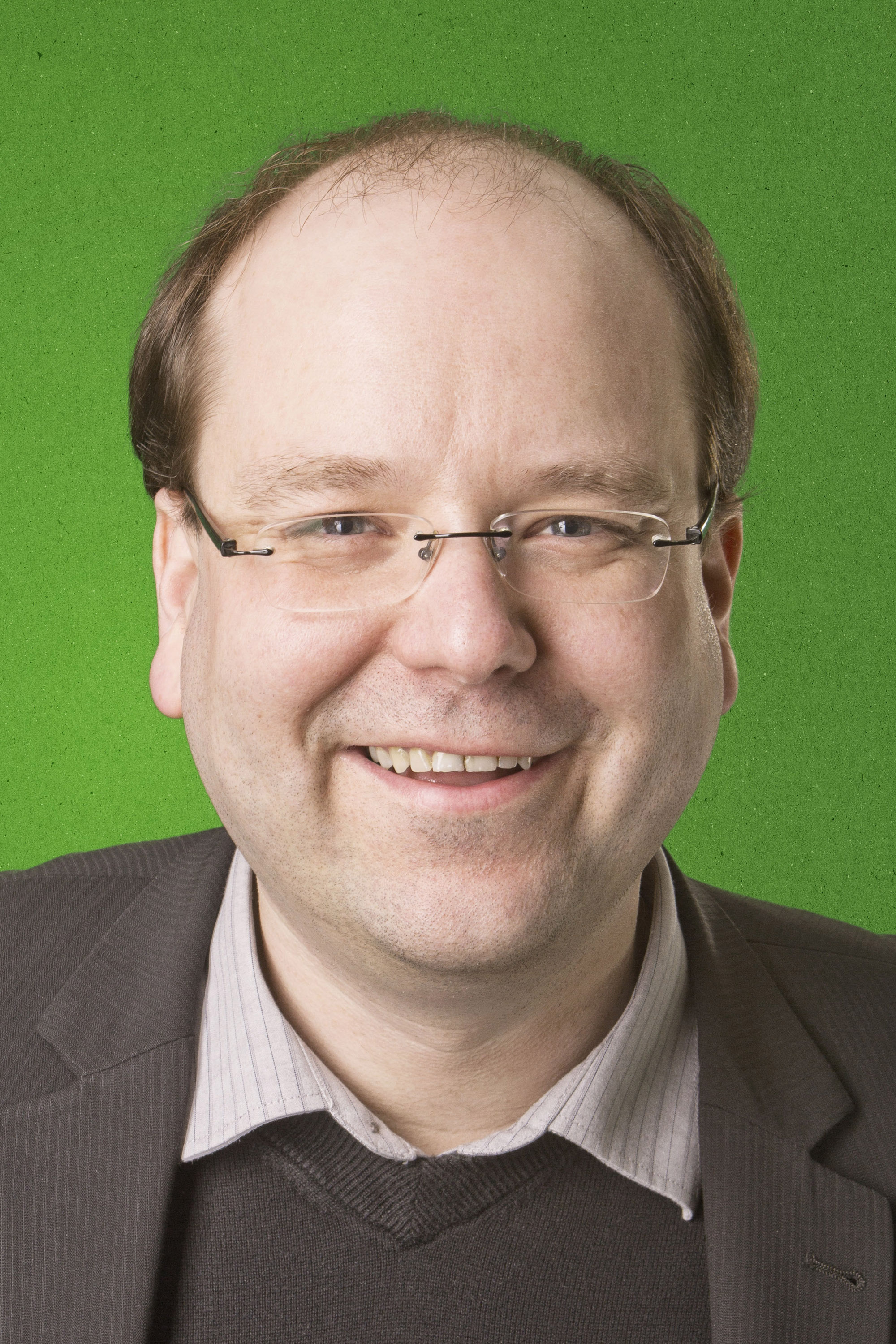

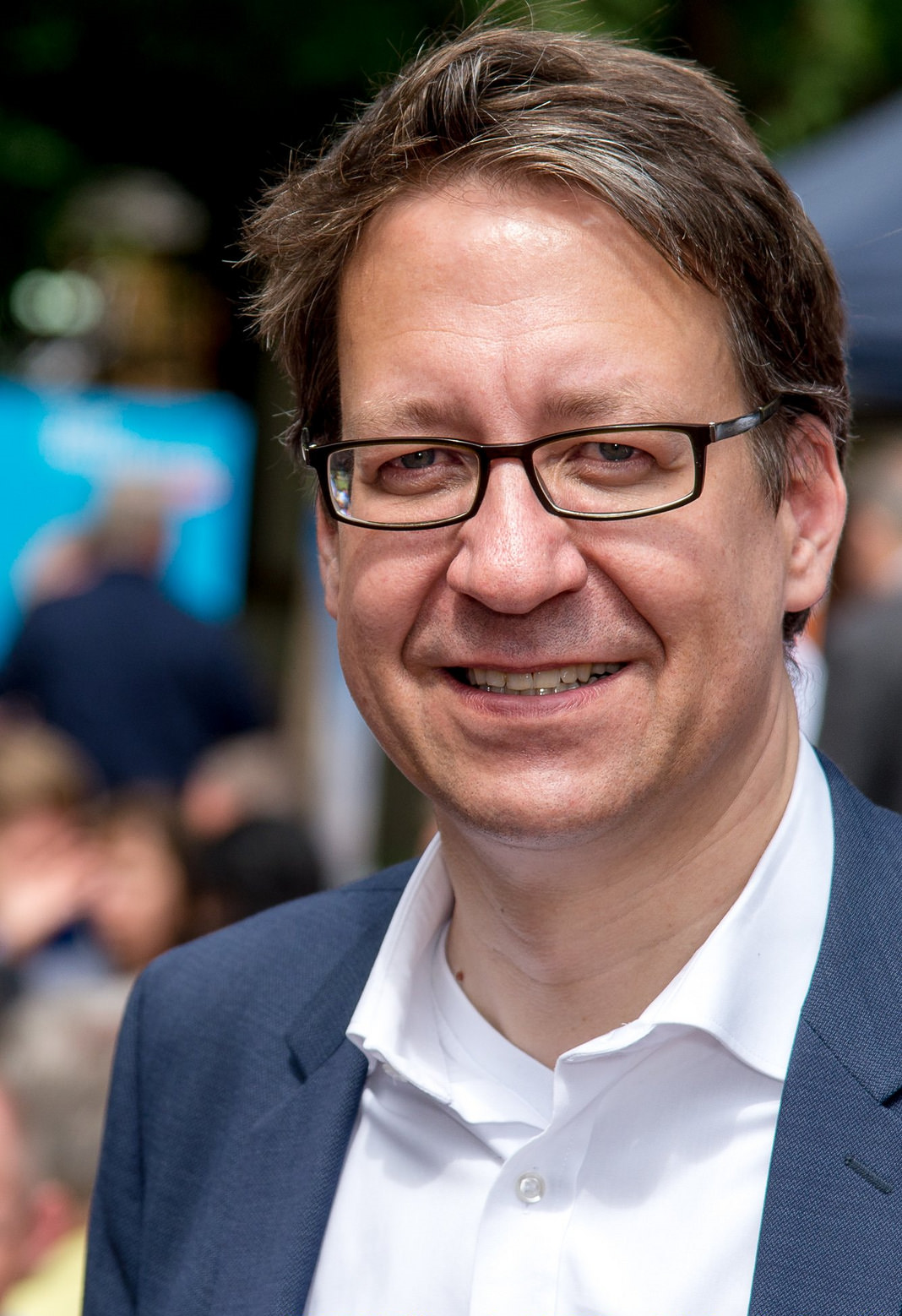
	First party	Second party	Third party
Leader	Stephan Weil	Bernd Althusmann	Julia Hamburg & Christian Meyer
Party	SPD	CDU	Greens
Last election	55 seats, 36.9%	50 seats, 33.6%	12 seats, 8.7%
Seats won	57	47	24
Seat change	▲2	▼3	▲12
Popular vote	1,211,418	1,017,276	526,923
Percentage	33.4%	28.1%	14.5%
Swing	▼3.5%	▼5.5%	▲5.8%
	Fourth party	Fifth party
Leader	Stefan Marzischewski-Drewes	Stefan Birkner
Party	AfD	FDP
Last election	9 seats, 6.2%	11 seats, 7.5%
Seats won	18	0
Seat change	▲9	▼11
Popular vote	396,839	170,298
Percentage	11.0%	4.7%
Swing	▲4.8%	▼2.8%
- Map of the election, showing the winner of each single-member district and the distribution of list seats.
Government before election
Second Weil cabinet
SPD–CDU
Government after election
Third Weil cabinet
SPD–Green

The 2022 Lower Saxony state election was held on 9 October 2022 to elect the 19th Landtag of Lower Saxony. The incumbent government was a coalition of the Social Democratic Party of Germany (SPD) and Christian Democratic Union of Germany (CDU) led by Minister-President Stephan Weil.

The SPD remained the largest party with 33% and gained two seats, despite a decline of 3.5 percentage points. The CDU suffered a larger loss and won 28%. Alliance 90/The Greens recorded their best result to date in the state, taking 14.5% on a swing of six points. Alternative for Germany (AfD) made gains for the first time in any election since October 2019, improving to 11%, while the Free Democratic Party (FDP) fell just short of the 5% electoral threshold and lost representation.

Amidst an ongoing energy crisis and looming recession, commentators described the result as a victory for the incumbent federal SPD government of Olaf Scholz, who had suffered a decline in popularity and recent losses in other state elections.

Minister-President Weil ruled out continuing government with the CDU and formed a new coalition with the Greens. He was re-elected as Minister-President by the Landtag on 8 November, and his cabinet was sworn in the same day.

== Background ==
Following the 2017 Lower Saxony state election, the incumbent red-green coalition government of minister-president Stephan Weil was 2 seats short of a majority in the Landtag. Due to FDP leader Stefan Birkner ruling out any coalition with SPD or Greens, and the Greens ruling out any coalition with CDU and FDP, the only option for a majority government was a grand coalition of SPD and CDU, considering no party wanted to form a coalition with the AfD.

On 22 November 2017, Weil was reelected as minister-president receiving 104 out of 137 votes as the head of a grand coalition.

== Electoral system ==
The Landtag of Lower Saxony is elected using mixed-member proportional representation. Its minimum size is 135 seats. Of these, 87 are elected in single-member constituencies, and the remainder are determined by party lists. Voters have two votes: the "first vote" for candidates within each individual constituency, and the "second vote" for party lists. There is an electoral threshold of 5% of second vote to qualify for seats. Seats are allocated using the d'Hondt method, with additional overhang and leveling seats provided to ensure proportionality. The normal term of the Landtag is 5 years.

== Parties ==
The table below lists parties represented in the 18th Landtag of Lower Saxony.

Name		Ideology	Lead candidate(s)	2017 result	
Name		Ideology	Lead candidate(s)	Votes (%)	Seats
SPD	Social Democratic Party of Germany; Sozialdemokratische Partei Deutschlands	Social democracy	Stephan Weil	36.9%	55 / 137
CDU	Christian Democratic Union of Germany; Christlich Demokratische Union Deutschlands	Christian democracy	Bernd Althusmann	33.6%	50 / 137
Grüne	Alliance 90/The Greens; Bündnis 90/Die Grünen	Green politics	Julia Hamburg & Christian Meyer	8.7%	12 / 137
FDP	Free Democratic Party; Freie Demokratische Partei	Classical liberalism	Stefan Birkner	7.5%	11 / 137
AfD	Alternative for Germany; Alternative für Deutschland	Right-wing populism	Stefan Marzischewski-Drewes	6.2%	9 / 137

== Opinion polling ==
=== Graphical summary ===
Local regression of polls conducted

=== Party polling ===
Polling firm	Fieldwork date	Sample size	SPD	CDU	Grüne	FDP	AfD	Linke	Others	Lead
2022 state election	9 Oct 2022	–	33.4	28.1	14.5	4.7	11.0	2.7	5.6	5.3
Wahlkreisprognose	6–7 Oct 2022	900	35	27	15.5	5	10	3	4.5	8
Forschungsgruppe Wahlen	5–6 Oct 2022	1,046	33	28	16	5	10	3.5	4.5	5
Civey	29 Sep–6 Oct 2022	3,001	33	27	17	5	10	4	4	6
Forsa	1–5 Oct 2022	1,004	33	27	17	5	9	3	6	6
INSA	29 Sep–4 Oct 2022	1,000	31	28	16	5	11	4	5	3
Wahlkreisprognose	29 Sep–1 Oct 2022	957	35	27	15.5	4.5	11	2.5	4.5	8
Forschungsgruppe Wahlen	26–29 Sep 2022	1,023	32	27	16	5	11	4	5	5
Infratest dimap	26–28 Sep 2022	1,529	32	30	16	5	9	3	5	2
Wahlkreisprognose	23–24 Sep 2022	1,000	35	27.5	15.5	5	9	2.5	5.5	7.5
Forsa	15–21 Sep 2022	2,018	31	27	19	5	9	3	6	4
Infratest dimap	15–20 Sep 2022	1,156	32	28	17	5	9	4	5	4
Wahlkreisprognose	16–17 Sep 2022	992	34.5	25.5	17.5	5.5	9	3	5	9
Wahlkreisprognose	8–9 Sep 2022	970	34.5	26	17	6	8.5	3	5	8.5
Wahlkreisprognose	1–2 Sep 2022	1,001	34.5	25	17	7.5	8.5	3	4.5	9.5
INSA	31 Aug–2 Sep 2022	1,000	31	28	19	7	7	4	4	3
Wahlkreisprognose	27–31 Aug 2022	1,410	32	29	19	6	7	2	5	3
Infratest dimap	24–29 Aug 2022	1,154	31	27	19	6	7	4	6	4
Forsa	16–23 Aug 2022	2,000	29	26	22	6	8	3	6	3
Wahlkreisprognose	15–20 Aug 2022	1,100	27	30	21	7	7	2	6	3
Wahlkreisprognose	1–5 Aug 2022	1,421	29	30	23	5	6	2	5	1
Wahlkreisprognose	11–17 Jul 2022	1,036	33	27	22	6	5	2	5	6
Infratest dimap	29 Jun–4 Jul 2022	1,154	30	27	22	7	6	3	5	3
Forsa	14–22 Jun 2022	2,009	30	26	22	6	7	3	6	4
INSA	13–20 Jun 2022	1,000	31	29	17	8	6	4	5	2
Wahlkreisprognose	4–11 Jun 2022	1,100	32	26	22	6	6	3	5	6
Wahlkreisprognose	19–24 May 2022	1,000	30.5	26	24	7	5	2	5.5	4.5
Wahlkreisprognose	25 Apr–1 May 2022	1,010	34	26	20	7	6	2	5	8
Forsa	19–26 Apr 2022	2,012	33	26	19	7	6	3	6	7
Wahlkreisprognose	19–22 Mar 2022	1,005	33	28	19	8	5.5	2	4.5	5
Forsa	15–22 Mar 2022	2,010	34	25	17	8	7	3	6	9
Wahlkreisprognose	26 Feb–4 Mar 2022	1,250	35	28.5	16	8	5.5	2.5	4.5	6.5
INSA	14–21 Feb 2022	1,000	34	26	14	11	7	4	4	8
Infratest dimap	11–16 Nov 2021	1,160	36	23	16	10	7	3	5	13
INSA	12–18 Oct 2021	1,000	39	19	13	12	7	5	5	20
Allensbach	6 Sep–1 Oct 2021	1,100	34	26	15	10	7	4	4	8
2021 federal election	26 Sep 2021	–	33.1	24.2	16.1	10.5	7.4	3.3	5.4	8.9
Wahlkreisprognose	16–26 Aug 2021	1,002	39	20	17	11	5	4	4	19
INSA	3–10 May 2021	1,000	29	26	20	9	7	5	4	3
Wahlkreisprognose	13–21 Apr 2021	–	27	25	25.5	8	7	3	4.5	1.5
INSA	22–29 Mar 2021	1,052	30	26	18	9	7	4	6	4
Allensbach	3 Feb–3 Mar 2021	950	27	33	20	6	5	5	4	6
INSA	26 Oct–2 Nov 2020	1,002	27	34	18	6	6	5	4	7
Wahlkreisprognose	6–13 Oct 2020	–	31.5	31	20	5	5.5	3	–	0.5
Infratest dimap	6–12 Oct 2020	1,004	27	35	20	4	6	5	3	8
Wahlkreisprognose	24 Jul–2 Aug 2020	–	33.5	32.5	15	6	5.5	4	–	1
Forsa	19–28 May 2020	1,002	30	32	16	5	5	6	6	2
Wahlkreisprognose	26 Apr–3 May 2020	–	36.5	35.5	11	5.5	5	3	–	1
Wahlkreisprognose	19–26 Mar 2020	–	35.5	32.5	16	5	4.5	3	–	3
2019 EP election	26 May 2019	–	20.9	29.9	22.6	5.0	7.9	3.8	9.8	7.3
Forsa	1–8 Feb 2019	1,010	28	30	17	7	8	5	5	2
Infratest dimap	15–20 Nov 2018	1,006	26	28	24	6	9	4	3	2
INSA	7–13 Nov 2018	1,053	26	27	17	10	12	5	3	1
Forsa	8–22 Feb 2018	1,004	33	33	10	8	6	6	4	Tie
2017 state election	15 Oct 2017	–	36.9	33.6	8.7	7.5	6.2	4.6	2.4	3.3

=== Minister-President polling ===
Polling firm	Fieldwork date	Sample size			Neither/ Unsure	Lead
Polling firm	Fieldwork date	Sample size	Weil SPD	Althusmann CDU	Neither/ Unsure	Lead
Wahlkreisprognose	6–7 Oct 2022	900	56	26	18	30
Forschungsgruppe Wahlen	5–6 Oct 2022	1,046	55	24	21	31
Wahlkreisprognose	29 Sep–1 Oct 2022	957	55	27	18	28
Forschungsgruppe Wahlen	26–29 Sep 2022	1,023	51	24	25	27
Infratest dimap	26–28 Sep 2022	1,529	50	28	22	22
Wahlkreisprognose	23–24 Sep 2022	1,000	56	28	16	28
Infratest dimap	15–20 Sep 2022	1,156	49	27	24	22
Wahlkreisprognose	16–17 Sep 2022	992	58	27	15	31
Wahlkreisprognose	8–9 Sep 2022	970	59	30	11	29
Wahlkreisprognose	1–2 Sep 2022	1,001	59	29	12	30
Wahlkreisprognose	27–31 Aug 2022	1,410	57	33	10	24
Infratest dimap	24–29 Aug 2022	1,169	50	27	23	23
Wahlkreisprognose	15–20 Aug 2022	1,100	54	31	15	23
Wahlkreisprognose	1–5 Aug 2022	1,421	53	30	17	23
Wahlkreisprognose	11–17 Jul 2022	1,036	57	26	17	31
Infratest dimap	29 Jun–4 Jul 2022	1,154	52	22	26	30
Wahlkreisprognose	4–11 Jun 2022	1,100	60	20	20	40
Wahlkreisprognose	19–24 May 2022	1,000	56	24	20	32
Wahlkreisprognose	25 Apr–1 May 2022	1,010	63	20	17	43
Infratest dimap	11–16 Nov 2021	1,160	59	21	20	38
Infratest dimap	6–12 Oct 2020	1,004	57	23	18	34
Infratest dimap	15–20 Nov 2018	1,006	53	26	21	27

=== Party competences ===
Polling firm	Fieldwork date	Sample size	Category	SPD	CDU	Grüne	FDP	AfD	Linke	None/Don′t Know	Lead
Infratest dimap	15–20 Sep 2022	1,156	Economy	29	32	4	8	4	1	17	3
Infratest dimap	15–20 Sep 2022	1,156	Education	30	24	8	4	5	3	21	6
Infratest dimap	15–20 Sep 2022	1,156	Social Justice	41	16	8	2	6	8	15	25
Infratest dimap	15–20 Sep 2022	1,156	Environment	13	14	43	2	4	1	18	29
Infratest dimap	15–20 Sep 2022	1,156	Crime	24	30	3	3	11	1	24	6
Infratest dimap	15–20 Sep 2022	1,156	Budget	28	27	5	10	4	2	20	1
Infratest dimap	15–20 Sep 2022	1,156	Saving Jobs	32	27	5	5	4	2	20	5
Infratest dimap	15–20 Sep 2022	1,156	Prices	25	17	5	5	6	3	34	8
Infratest dimap	15–20 Sep 2022	1,156	Transport	24	24	16	5	3	1	22	Tie
Infratest dimap	15–20 Sep 2022	1,156	Energy Supply	22	24	15	4	6	1	18	2
Infratest dimap	15–20 Sep 2022	1,156	Solving Biggest Problems	32	25	8	2	4	2	22	7
Infratest dimap	6–12 Oct 2020	1,004	Economy	22	44	7	5	2	1	7	22
Infratest dimap	6–12 Oct 2020	1,004	Education	29	30	9	4	1	3	10	1
Infratest dimap	6–12 Oct 2020	1,004	Social Justice	40	19	11	2	2	8	10	21
Infratest dimap	6–12 Oct 2020	1,004	Environment	15	19	45	1	2	1	9	26
Infratest dimap	6–12 Oct 2020	1,004	Crime	22	44	3	1	5	2	10	22
Infratest dimap	6–12 Oct 2020	1,004	Migration	21	31	11	3	6	4	13	10
Infratest dimap	6–12 Oct 2020	1,004	Agriculture	15	25	36	1	1	1	7	11
Infratest dimap	6–12 Oct 2020	1,004	Budget	21	46	4	5	2	1	8	25
Infratest dimap	6–12 Oct 2020	1,004	Solving Biggest Problems	28	35	9	2	3	2	7	7
Infratest dimap	15–20 Nov 2018	1,006	Economy	26	46	6	6	1	1	12	20
Infratest dimap	15–20 Nov 2018	1,006	Education	29	26	14	3	2	4	19	3
Infratest dimap	15–20 Nov 2018	1,006	Social Justice	39	16	16	1	2	7	16	23
Infratest dimap	15–20 Nov 2018	1,006	Environment	16	15	51	3	1	1	12	35
Infratest dimap	15–20 Nov 2018	1,006	Crime	25	40	4	2	6	2	18	15
Infratest dimap	15–20 Nov 2018	1,006	Migration	26	23	14	3	6	3	22	3
Infratest dimap	15–20 Nov 2018	1,006	Agriculture	13	23	44	3	1	1	13	21
Infratest dimap	15–20 Nov 2018	1,006	Saving Jobs	37	34	6	3	2	2	14	3
Infratest dimap	15–20 Nov 2018	1,006	Solving Biggest Problems	31	29	12	2	3	1	19	2

== Results ==
Party	Constituency			List			Total seats	+/–
Party	Votes	%	Seats	Votes	%	Swing	Total seats	+/–
Social Democratic Party of Germany (SPD)	1,235,921	34.2	57	1,211,418	33.4	▼3.5	57	▲2
Christian Democratic Union of Germany (CDU)	1,147,969	31.8	27	1,017,276	28.1	▼5.5	47	▼3
Alliance 90/The Greens (GRÜNE)	522,198	14.5	3	526,923	14.5	▲5.8	24	▲12
Alternative for Germany (AfD)	321,135	8.9	0	396,839	11.0	▲4.8	18	▲9
Free Democratic Party (FDP)	160,791	4.5	0	170,298	4.7	▼2.8	0	▼11
The Left (DIE LINKE)	107,326	3.0	0	98,585	2.7	▼1.9	0	±0
Human Environment Animal Protection Party (Tierschutzpartei)	3,497	0.1	0	53,139	1.5	▲0.8	0	±0
Grassroots Democratic Party of Germany (dieBasis)	45,287	1.3	0	36,603	1.0	New	0	New
Die PARTEI	13,316	0.4	0	34,159	0.9	▲0.3	0	±0
Free Voters (FW)	29,289	0.8	0	30,453	0.8	▲0.4	0	±0
Volt Germany (Volt)	7,377	0.2	0	16,663	0.5	New	0	New
Pirate Party Germany (Piraten)	3,294	0.1	0	14,242	0.4	▲0.2	0	±0
Party for Health Research (Gesundheitsforschung)	–	–	–	10,673	0.3	New	0	New
The Humanists (Die Humanisten)	603	0.0	0	6,528	0.2	New	0	New
Centre Party (ZENTRUM)	1,908	0.1	0	–	–	New	0	New
Solidarity, Justice and Change (SGV)	837	0.0	0	–	–	New	0	New
The Frisians	587	0.0	0	–	–	–	0	New
Ecological Democratic Party (ÖDP)	526	0.0	0	–	–	▼0.1	0	±0
Alliance C – Christians for Germany (Bündnis C)	233	0.0	0	–	–	–	0	±0
The Others	190	0.0	0	–	–	New	0	New
Independents	6,329	0.2	0	–	–	–	0	±0
Valid	3,609,304	98.7		3,623,799	99.1			
Invalid	48,577	1.3		34,082	0.9			
Total	3,657,881	100.0	87	3,657,881	100.0		146	+9
Registered voters/turnout	6,064,738	60.3		6,064,738	60.3	▼2.8		
Source: State Returning Officer

== Government formation ==
Having ruled out cooperation with the AfD, the SPD was able to form a majority government with either the CDU or Greens. The CDU had hoped to pursue a three-party coalition with the Greens and FDP, but after it became clear that the latter had fallen out of the Landtag, this was no longer possible. Minister-President Weil indicated a strong preference for a coalition with the Greens, which they reciprocated. Four days after the election on 13 October, the SPD and Greens agreed to preliminary discussions, with the goal of finalising government negotiations by 3 November. Formal coalition talks began on schedule on 26 October. Both parties avoided leaking information about the proceedings, and insisted that distribution of ministries would be dealt with after matters of policy had been settled. Nonetheless, both favoured greater investment in housing, education, and renewable energy. On the other hand, areas such as transport, climate targets, natural gas production, and police were flagged as potential difficulties.

The SPD and Greens announced just a few days later, on 31 October, that negotiations had concluded successfully. The coalition pact was approved by both parties and signed on 7 November. It included plans for a six billion euro relief package to fight the ongoing energy crisis. The new government also agreed to raise starting salaries for teachers, establish a state housing company geared toward construction of affordable housing, and introduce a statewide 29-euro transit ticket for students, trainees, and volunteers.

Stephan Weil was re-elected as Minister-President by the Landtag on 8 November, winning 82 votes out of 145 cast. Given that the governing coalition held 81 seats, this indicated support from at least one opposition deputy. The third Weil cabinet was sworn in the same day, comprising six SPD ministers and four Greens.
