= Daniela Behrens =

German politician (born 1968)

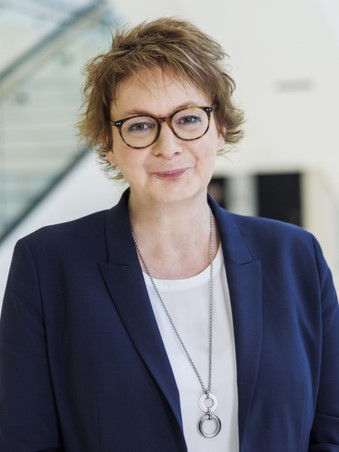
- Behrens in 2022

Minister of the Interior and Sports of Lower Saxony
- Incumbent
- Assumed office 25 January 2023
- Minister-President: Stephan Weil; Olaf Lies
- Preceded by: Boris Pistorius

Personal details
- Born: 12 May 1968 (age 57) Bremerhaven
- Party: Social Democratic Party (since 1994)

Daniela Behrens (née Krause; born 12 May 1968 in Bremerhaven) is a German politician serving as minister of the interior and sports of Lower Saxony since 2023. From 2021 to 2023, she served as minister of social affairs, labour, health and equality. She has been a member of the Landtag of Lower Saxony since 2023, having previously served from 2007 to 2013.
