= Dörte Liebetruth =

German politician (born 1979)

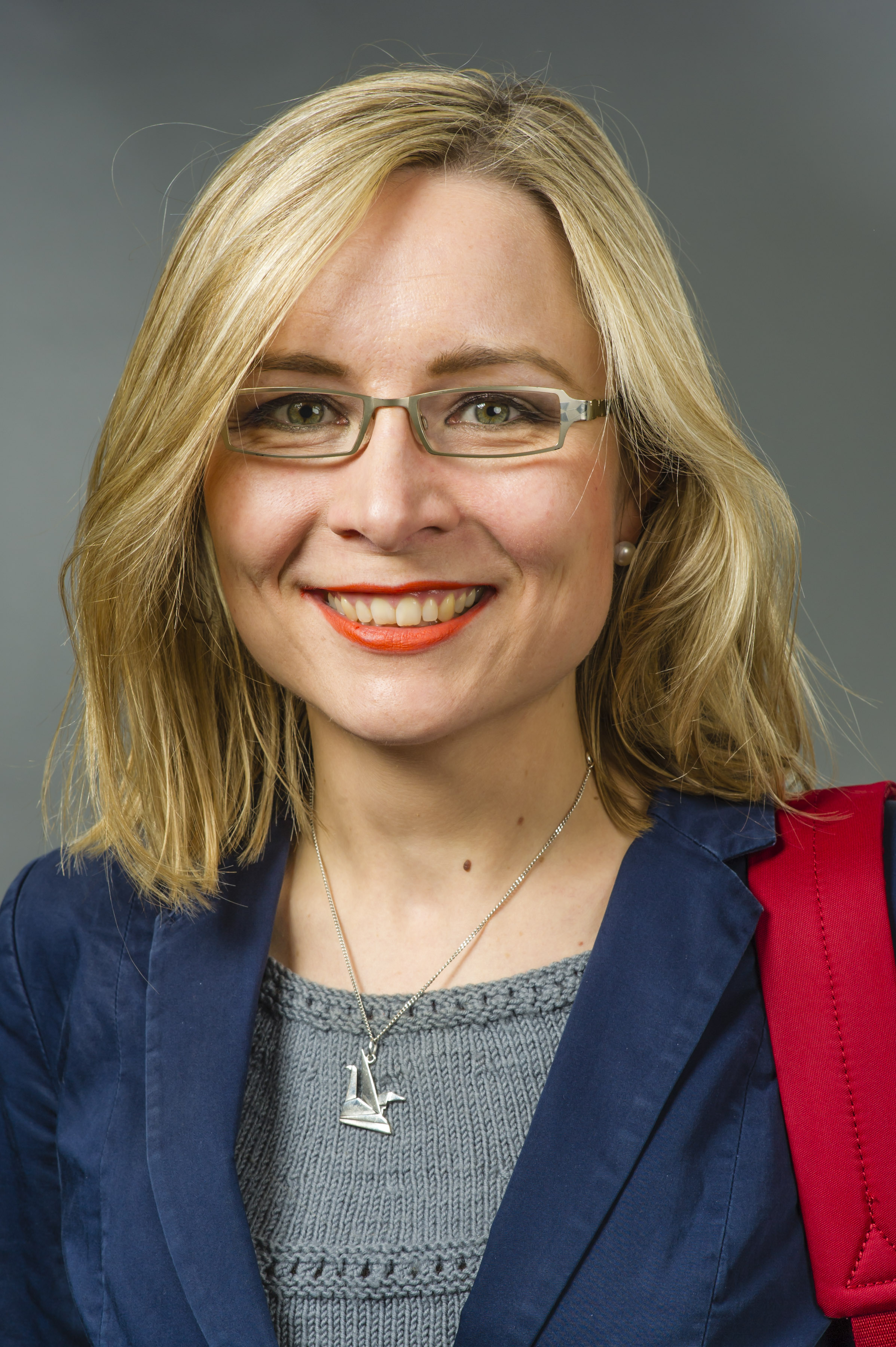
- Liebetruth in 2018

Member of the Landtag of Lower Saxony
- Incumbent
- Assumed office 14 November 2017
- Preceded by: Adrian Mohr
- Constituency: Verden

Personal details
- Born: 23 November 1979 (age 46)
- Party: Social Democratic Party (since 1994)

Dörte Liebetruth (born 23 November 1979) is a German politician serving as a member of the Landtag of Lower Saxony since 2017. She has served as secretary general of the Social Democratic Party in Lower Saxony since 2023.
