= Olaf Lies =

German politician

Olaf Lies MdL MdBR
- Lies in 2026

Minister-President of Lower Saxony
- Incumbent
- Assumed office 20 May 2025
- Deputy: Julia Hamburg
- Preceded by: Stephan Weil

Leader of the Social Democratic Party in Lower Saxony
- Incumbent
- Assumed office 24 May 2025
- Deputy: Adis Ahmetovic; Dunja Kreiser; Philipp Raulfs; Svenja Stadler; Kathrin Wahlmann
- General Secretary: Dörte Liebetruth
- Preceded by: Stephan Weil
- In office 29 May 2010 – 20 January 2012
- Preceded by: Garrelt Duin
- Succeeded by: Stephan Weil
Lower Saxony Cabinet
Minister for Economic Affairs, Housing, Transport and Digitalization
In office 8 November 2022 – 20 May 2025
Minister-President	Stephan Weil
Preceded by	Bernd Althusmann
Succeeded by	Grant Hendrik Tonne
Minister for Environment, Energy, Building and Climate Protection
In office 22 November 2017 – 8 November 2022
Minister-President	Stephan Weil
Preceded by	Stefan Wenzel
Succeeded by	Christian Meyer
Minister for Economic Affairs, Labour and Transport
In office 19 February 2013 – 22 November 2017
Minister-President	Stephan Weil
Preceded by	Jörg Bode
Succeeded by	Bernd Althusmann

Member of the Landtag of Lower Saxony for Friesland
- Incumbent
- Assumed office 27 January 2008
- Preceded by: Constituency established

Personal details
- Born: 8 May 1967 (age 59) Wilhelmshaven, West Germany
- Party: Social Democratic Party of Germany

Olaf Lies (born 8 May 1967) is a German politician who has served as Minister President of Lower Saxony and leader of the Social Democratic Party of Germany in Lower Saxony since May 2025. He has been a Member of the Landtag of Lower Saxony for Friesland since 2008 and previously held several cabinet positions in the state government of his predecessor, Stephan Weil.

== Political career ==
Lies joined the Social Democratic Party in 2002. In the 2008 state elections he became member of the Landtag of Lower Saxony. He was leader of his party in Lower Saxony from 2010 to 2012.

Minister-President Stephan Weil of Lower Saxony appointed Lies to the position of State Minister for Economics, Labour and Transport in 2013 and later to State Minister for Environment, Energy, Building, and Climate Protection in his cabinet.

In the negotiations to form a coalition government under the leadership of Chancellor Angela Merkel following the 2017 federal elections, Lies was part of the working group on energy, climate protection and the environment, led by Armin Laschet, Georg Nüßlein and Barbara Hendricks.

In the negotiations to form a so-called traffic light coalition of the SPD, the Green Party and the Free Democratic Party (FDP) following the 2021 federal elections, Lies was part of his party's delegation in the working group on agriculture and nutrition, co-chaired by Till Backhaus, Renate Künast and Carina Konrad.

Lies was nominated by his party as delegate to the Federal Convention for the purpose of electing the President of Germany in 2022.

On 1 April 2025, Stephan Weil announced that he would step down as Minister President of Lower Saxony and leader of the SPD in Lower Saxony. On 16 May 2025, a special state party conference selected Olaf Lies as the party's candidate to succeed him. On 20 May, the Landtag of Lower Saxony elected Lies as Minister President in the first round of voting, with 80 of the 144 votes cast. On 24 May 2025, he was elected leader of the SPD in Lower Saxony at the party's regular state conference.

Lies is expected to be SPD's lead candidate in the 2027 Lower Saxony state election.

== Other activities ==
=== Regulatory agencies ===
- Federal Network Agency for Electricity, Gas, Telecommunications, Post and Railway (BNetzA), Member of the Advisory Board

=== Corporate boards ===
- Meyer Werft, Member of the supervisory board (since 2024)
- Deutsche Messe, Member of the Supervisory Board
- Volkswagen Group, Member of the supervisory board (since 2013)

=== Non-profit organizations ===
- Business Forum of the Social Democratic Party of Germany, Member of the Political Advisory Board (since 2020)
- German Federal Environmental Foundation (DBU), Member of the Board of Trustees (since 2018)
