= Philipp Raulfs =

German politician (born 1991)

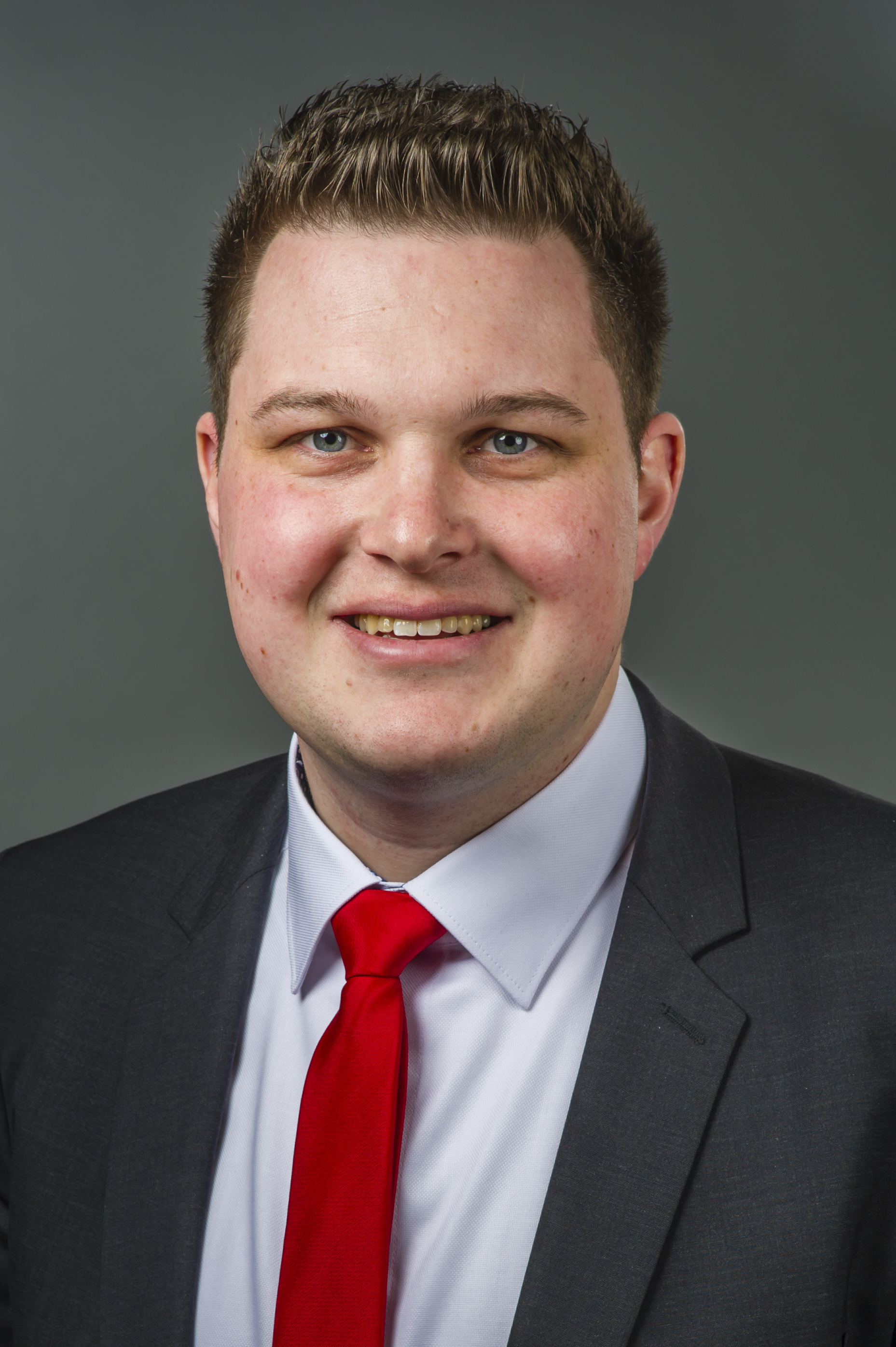
- Raulfs in 2018

Member of the Landtag of Lower Saxony
- Incumbent
- Assumed office 14 November 2017

Personal details
- Born: 25 April 1991 (age 35)
- Party: Social Democratic Party (since 2011)

Philipp Raulfs (born 25 April 1991) is a German politician serving as a member of the Landtag of Lower Saxony since 2017. He has served as mayor of Hillerse since 2021.
