= Christian Meyer (politician) =

German politician (born 1975)

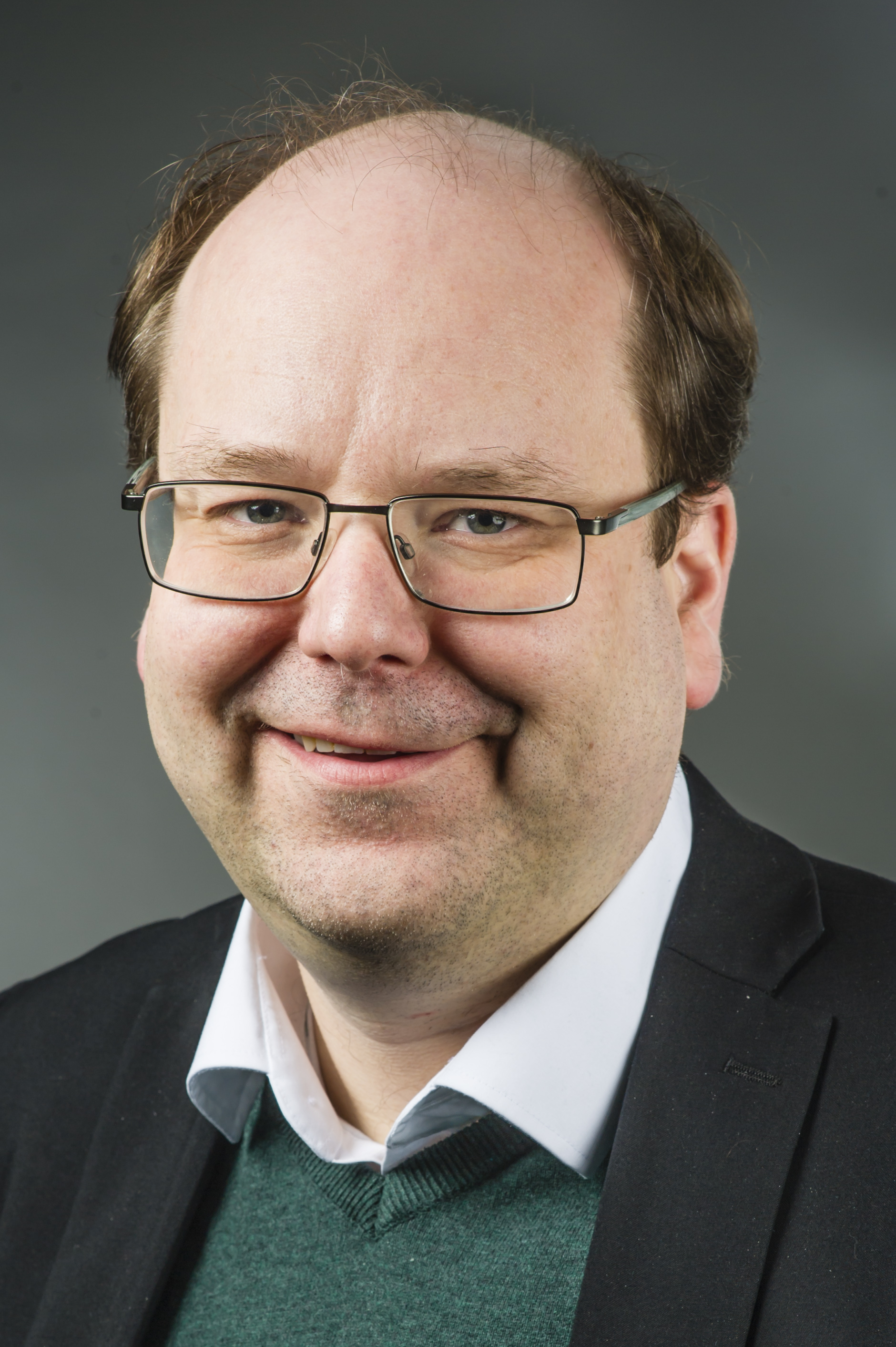

Minister for Environment, Energy and Climate Protection of Lower Saxony
- Incumbent
- Assumed office 8 November 2022
- Minister-President: Stephan Weil
- Preceded by: Olaf Lies

Personal details
- Born: 23 July 1975 (age 50) Holzminden, West Germany
- Occupation: Politician

Christian Meyer (born 23 July 1975) is a German politician of the Alliance '90/The Greens who has been serving as State Minister for Environment, Energy and Climate Protection in the cabinet of Minister-President of Lower Saxony Stephan Weil since 2022.

== Political career ==
Meyer was born in Holzminden, Lower Saxony. In the 2008 and 2013 state elections, he was elected to the Landtag of Lower Saxony.

From 2013 to 2017, Meyer served as State Minister of Food, Agriculture, Consumer Protection and State Development in the state government under Minister-President Stephan Weil. As one of the state’s representatives at the Bundesrat, he serves on the Committee on the Environment, Nature Conservation and Nuclear Safety.

== Other activities ==
- German Federal Environmental Foundation (DBU), Member of the Board of Trustees (since 2023)
- Norddeutsche Landesbank, Chairman of the Advisory Board on Agricultural Credit Operations
- Greenpeace, Member
- World Wide Fund for Nature, Member
