= Stephan Weil =

German politician (born 1958)

Stephan Weil MdL MdBR
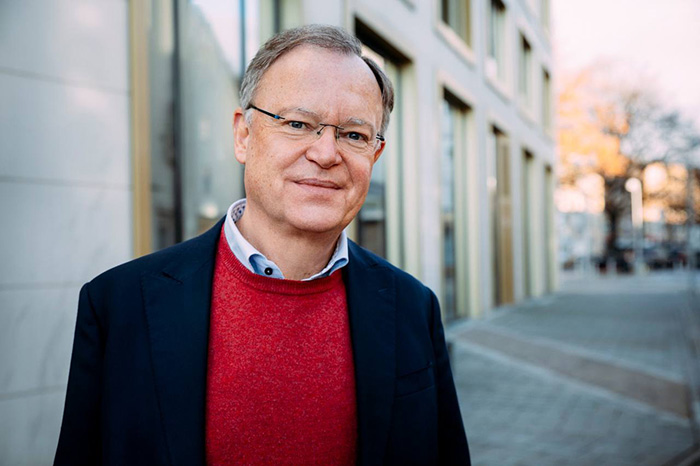
- Weil in 2021

Minister-President of Lower Saxony
- In office 19 February 2013 – 20 May 2025
- Deputy: Stefan Wenzel; Bernd Althusmann; Julia Hamburg
- Preceded by: David McAllister
- Succeeded by: Olaf Lies

President of the Bundesrat
- In office 1 November 2013 – 31 October 2014
- First Vice President: Winfried Kretschmann
- Preceded by: Winfried Kretschmann
- Succeeded by: Volker Bouffier

Leader of the Social Democratic Party of Lower Saxony
- Incumbent
- Assumed office 20 January 2012
- General Secretary: Detlef Tanke; Hanna Naber; Dörte Liebetruth
- Deputy: Carola Reimann; Olaf Lies; Johanne Modder; Dörte Liebetruth; Philipp Raulfs
- Preceded by: Olaf Lies

Lord Mayor of Hanover
- In office 1 November 2006 – 19 February 2013
- Preceded by: Herbert Schmalstieg
- Succeeded by: Stefan Schostok

Member of the Landtag of Lower Saxony for Hannover-Buchholz
- Incumbent
- Assumed office 19 February 2013
- Preceded by: Gisela Konrath

Personal details
- Born: Stephan-Peter Weil; 15 December 1958 (age 67) Hamburg, West Germany (now Germany)
- Party: Social Democratic Party of Germany (1980–)
- Spouse: Rosemarie Kerkow-Weil (m. 1987)
- Children: 1
- Education: University of Göttingen
- Occupation: Politician; Lawyer; Civil Servant; Judge
- Website: Official website

Stephan Weil (born 15 December 1958) is a German politician and the leader of the Social Democratic Party in Lower Saxony. On 20 January 2013, the SPD and the Green party won the 2013 Lower Saxony state election by one seat. On 19 February 2013, he was elected Minister President of Lower Saxony with the votes of SPD and Alliance '90/The Greens. From 1 November 2013 until 31 October 2014 he was President of the Bundesrat and ex officio deputy to the President of Germany. In November 2017, he was again elected Minister President with the votes of SPD and CDU.

== Early life and education ==
Weil has lived in Hanover since 1965, where he completed the abitur at the Kaiser-Wilhelm-Gymnasium. After his mandatory community service in 1978 he began a law degree in Göttingen, which he finished with his first state examination in 1983. He then worked as a lawyer in Hanover, and later became a public prosecutor and judge. In 1994, Weil became a member of the ministerial council of Lower Saxony.

== Political career ==
In his early years, Weil served as chairman of the SPD Jusos in Hanover. From 1997 until late October 2006 he held the office of the city treasurer.

=== Mayor of Hannover, 2006–2013 ===
In May 2006 he was chosen as the SPD candidate for the Hanover mayoral election on 10 September 2006 against the CDU politician Dirk Topeffer and Ingrid Wagemann of Alliance '90/The Greens. He won an absolute majority in the first round. He succeeded Herbert Schmalstieg, the mayor of Hanover for 34 years on 1 November 2006. Weil held the office for 7 years, up to 2013 state election. Due to legal restrictions, Weil was automatically removed from the office of mayor when he became Minister President of Lower Saxony on 19 February 2013.

From 29 January 2008 to 2011, Weil monthly answered questions from citizens in the TV program Warum Herr Weil (Why Mr. Weil) which airs every third Tuesday every month on HR Fernsehen.

On 18 September 2011 Weil announced that he would apply for the top candidate of the SPD for the 2013 state election in Lower Saxony. He was elected as the top candidate with 53.3% of votes on 27 September 2011. On 20 January 2012 he was voted as the chairman of SPD Lower Saxony. In March, Weil was unanimously chosen as the SPD direct candidate for the Hanover-Buchholz constituency. On the state convention in Hameln, Weil placed first with 98.95%.

=== Minister-President of Lower Saxony, 2013–2025 ===
Just weeks before the state election, opinion polls indicated that Weil, with the help of the Greens, would easily defeat incumbent Minister-President David McAllister. After McAllister's Christian-liberal coalition had been considered to be the winner until late in the night, Weil's red-green coalition eventually won the election by a wafer-thin majority, resulting in a narrow majority of just one vote in the state parliament. At the time, his victory constituted the twelfth consecutive setback in a state vote for Chancellor Angela Merkel’s CDU party and therefore was widely interpreted as indicative for the national elections later that year. Early on in his tenure, Weil emphasized consolidating Lower Saxony's finances.

As Lower Saxony has a 20 percent stake in Volkswagen (VW), Weil has been an ex-officio member of the company's supervisory board since February 2013. Within the supervisory board, he serves on the mediation and the nomination committees. Only a few months after Weil took office, Germany won a decisive victory over the European Commission in its bid to preserve state influence at VW, when the European Court of Justice rejected an attempt by the commission to abolish a state veto over key decisions such as factory closures, mergers and acquisitions.

In August 2017, Weil called for parliament to be dissolved a few months early and new elections to be held (elections had been planned for 2018), after one deputy, Elke Twesten, who had not been nominated for reelection by the Green Party, had quit her party and joined the CDU in the opposition, costing his coalition government its one-seat parliamentary majority. This had endangered Weil's position because it hypothetically would have enabled the CDU to elect their leader Bernd Althusmann as Minister President by a motion of no confidence.

Prior to the election, the SPD and its coalition had been in very low approval and poll ratings, but following this event the party won the election by a wide margin over the CDU, strongly improving their own result and winning many usual Greens voters for their best result since Gerhard Schröder in 1998. Nonetheless, the red-green coalition lost its majority by two seats due to the weakened Greens, even though the two parties came much nearer to a majority than deemed possible in the latest polls. Despite the rough election campaign between SPD and CDU and heavy accusations over the party affiliation change as a manipulative move to bypass voters and shift the parliamentary majority, Weil succeeded in negotiating and forming a grand coalition with the CDU and Althusmann after the election. In November 2017, he was again elected Minister President with the votes of SPD and CDU.

In 2024, in response to the threat of mass layoffs at Volkswagen, Weil wanted to restore government subsidies for the purchase of electric cars.

=== Role in national politics ===
In his capacity as Minister-President, Weil was elected vice president of the Bundesrat from 1 March 2013, and served as President of the Bundesrat from November 2013 to October 2014. On the Bundesrat, he is a member of the Committee on Foreign Affairs and deputy chairman of the Committee on European Affairs.

In the negotiations to form a Grand Coalition of Chancellor Angela Merkel's Christian Democrats (CDU together with the Bavarian CSU) and the SPD following the 2013 federal elections, Weil was part of the SPD delegation in the working group on energy policy, led by Peter Altmaier and Hannelore Kraft.

In the negotiations to form a so-called traffic light coalition of the SPD, the Green Party and the Free Democratic Party (FDP) following the 2021 federal elections, Weil was part of his party's delegation in the working group on climate change and energy policy, co-chaired by Matthias Miersch, Oliver Krischer and Lukas Köhler.

Weil was nominated by his party as delegate to the Federal Convention for the purpose of electing the President of Germany in 2022.

In 2025, the government of Chancellor Friedrich Merz appointed Weil as co-chair – alongside Eckhardt Rehberg and Stefan Müller – of an expert commission to advise Minister of Finance Lars Klingbeil on reforming Germany's rules on public debt.

== Other activities ==
=== Corporate boards ===
- Deutsche Messe AG, chairman of the supervisory board (2009–2012)
- Sparkasse Hannover, chairman of the supervisory board (2006–2013)

=== Non-profit organizations ===
- Business Forum of the Social Democratic Party of Germany, member of the political advisory board (since 2018)
- Robert Enke Foundation, chairman of the board of trustees
- Kestner Gesellschaft, member of the board of trustees
- Freundeskreis Hannover, member of the board of trustees
- Deutsches Museum, member of the board of trustees
- Hannover Medical School, member of the board of trustees
- German Association of Local Utilities (VKU), president (2007–2012)
- Rotary International, member

== Honours ==
- 2023 Grand Cross of the Order of Merit of the Federal Republic of Germany

== Personal life ==
In 1987, Weil married public health expert Rosemarie Kerkow-Weil (born 1954), former president of Leibniz University Hannover, who teaches at the HAWK Hochschule Hildesheim/Holzminden/Göttingen. They have one son.

Political offices
Preceded by Herbert Schmalstieg	Mayor of Hanover; 2006–2013	Succeeded by Stefan Schostok
Preceded by David McAllister	Prime Minister of Lower Saxony; 2013–present	Incumbent
Party political offices
Preceded by Olaf Lies	Chairman of the Social Democratic Party in Lower Saxony; 2012–present	Incumbent
