= Frauke Heiligenstadt =

German politician

Frauke Heiligenstadt MdB
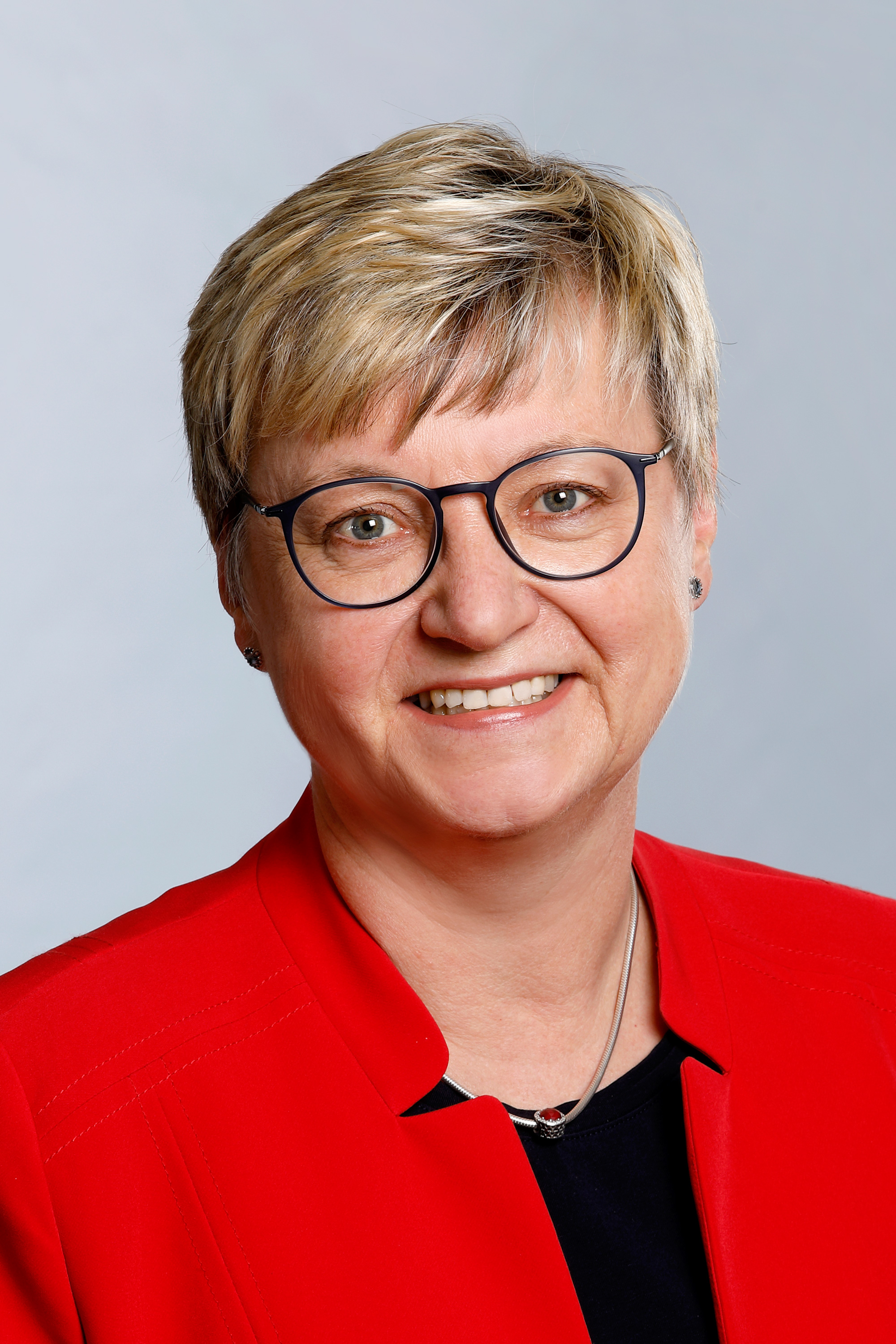
- Heiligenstadt in 2021

Member of the Bundestag
- Incumbent
- Assumed office 26 September 2021
- Preceded by: Roy Kühne
- Constituency: Goslar – Northeim – Osterode (2021–2025); Goslar – Northeim – Göttingen II (2025–present)

Minister for Education and Culture of Lower Saxony
- In office 19 February 2013 – 22 November 2017
- Minister-President: Stephan Weil
- Preceded by: Bernd Althusmann
- Succeeded by: Grant Hendrik Tonne

Member of the Landtag of Lower Saxony; for Northeim
- In office 4 March 2003 – 11 November 2021
- Preceded by: Axel Endlein
- Succeeded by: Renate Geuter

Personal details
- Born: 24 March 1966 (age 60) Northeim, West Germany
- Party: Social Democratic
- Occupation: Politician

Frauke Heiligenstadt (born 24 March 1966) is a German politician of the Social Democratic Party who has been serving as a member of the Bundestag since 26 October 2021. She was a member of the Lower Saxony state parliament from 2003 to 2021, and Lower Saxony's Minister of Education from 2013 to 2017.

== Early life and education ==
Heiligenstadt was born in the West German town of Northeim. After graduating from the Gymnasium Corvinianum in Northeim in 1985, Heiligenstadt studied at the University of Applied Sciences and Arts for Administration and Administration of Justice in Hanover. She graduated in 1988 and worked as a graduate in administration at the Northeim city administration until her election to the state parliament.

== Career ==
From 1994 to 2003, Heiligenstadt was head of the Office for Economic Development and Real Estate at the City of Northeim. Heiligenstadt was a member of the State Parliament of Lower Saxony from 2003 to 2021.

From 2013 to 2017, Heiligenstadt served as State Minister of Education in the government of Minister President Stephan Weil of Lower Saxony. In October 2017, she announced her intention to leave the government after the 2017 elections.

Heiligenstadt was elected to the Bundestag directly in 2021, representing the Goslar – Northeim – Osterode district. In parliament, she has since been serving on the Finance Committee. Since the 2025 elections, she has been her parliamentary group's spokesperson on financial regulation.

Within her parliamentary group, Heiligenstadt belongs to the Parliamentary Left, a left-wing movement.

== Other activities ==
- German United Services Trade Union (ver.di), Member
- AWO
- Max Planck Institute for Solar System Research, Member of the Board of Trustees (2013–2018)
- City marketing Northeim e.V.

In addition, Frauke Heiligenstadt is involved in numerous local associations, including the fire department and the Heimat- und Verkehrsverein.

== Personal life ==
Heiligenstadt is married and lives with her husband and daughter in Gillersheim, a district of the municipality of Katlenburg-Lindau. Her father was a roofer.

== Politics ==
=== Political beginnings and in Lower Saxony's state politics ===
Frauke Heiligenstadt has been a member of the SPD since 1982. From 1993 to 2001, she was chairwoman of the SPD local association Gillersheim (municipality of Katlenburg-Lindau). Since 2003, she has been a member of the executive committee of the SPD district of Hanover, and since 2019, she has been chairwoman of the SPD sub-district of Northeim-Einbeck. From 1986 to 2011 she was a member of the local council Gillersheim, from 1999 to 2006 local mayor. From 1991 to 2013 she was a member of the municipal council of Katlenburg-Lindau, from 1996 to 2011 she was an alderman and from 2006 to 2011 deputy mayor. Since 2006 she has been a member of the district council of the Northeim district and since 2018 its chairwoman. For the electoral district of Northeim, Frauke Heiligenstadt has been a member of the Lower Saxony state parliament since 2003. There she was until 2013 spokeswoman for cultural and school policy. Since 2017 she is spokeswoman for budget and fiscal policy. From 2013 to 2017, she was Lower Saxony's Minister of Culture in the Weil I cabinet, a member of the Bundesrat and Chairwoman of the Board of Trustees of the Lower Saxony Memorials Foundation in Celle.

=== In the German Bundestag ===
In the 2021 Bundestag election, Heiligenstadt stood as a direct candidate in the constituency of Goslar - Northeim - Osterode and in 10th place on the SPD state list. She won the direct mandate for her constituency and thus belongs to the 20th German Bundestag. She resigned her state parliament mandate; Renate Geuter moved up for her. In the wake of the COVID-19 pandemic, Heiligenstadt was among the supporters of a general vaccination requirement in Germany.

== Criticism ==
The state government's school policy increasingly brought Heiligenstadt into the media from August 2013. One particularly controversial measure was the increase in the number of compulsory hours for grammar school teachers by one lesson, which brought her criticism from teachers' associations, especially as she rejected investigations into teachers' actual working hours on the grounds that "you can't gain any insights with bookkeeping". As a result, the high school teachers refused to continue to organize free class trips, which they are not obliged to do under Lower Saxony school law. With the support of the Philologists' Association and the Education and Science Union (GEW) several teachers successfully sued against the controversial decree before the Higher Administrative Court of Lüneburg. The reason given for the ruling against the state of Lower Saxony on 9 June 2015, was the lack of an investigation into the actual workload of teachers; the increase in working hours for Lower Saxony's high school teachers issued by Heiligenstadt was declared unlawful, as the state of Lower Saxony had violated its duty of care toward teachers. Since then, there has also been sporadic internal criticism of the Red-Green state government's course in school policy.

Also at odds with Heiligenstadt's controversial decree on working hours was her own earlier criticism as an opposition politician in 2009: at that time, she was still denouncing the overwork of Lower Saxony's teachers by the CDU and urgently calling for teachers' workloads to be reduced.

In May 2015, when students from the Gymnasium in Brake protested Heiligenstadt's school policies on their school's homepage, criticizing the shortage of teachers, the devaluation of the Abitur, and the increase in the number of compulsory hours for Gymnasium teachers, the Lower Saxony state education authority intervened and, by official order, had the article on the school homepage and a link to an article in the local press reporting on the Brake students' protest against the hours increase deleted. This censorship by the school board, which had been coordinated with the Minister of Education, was only withdrawn after massive protests and critical reports in the national press. The principal was nevertheless summoned to a disciplinary meeting.
