= Gero Clemens Hocker =

German politician

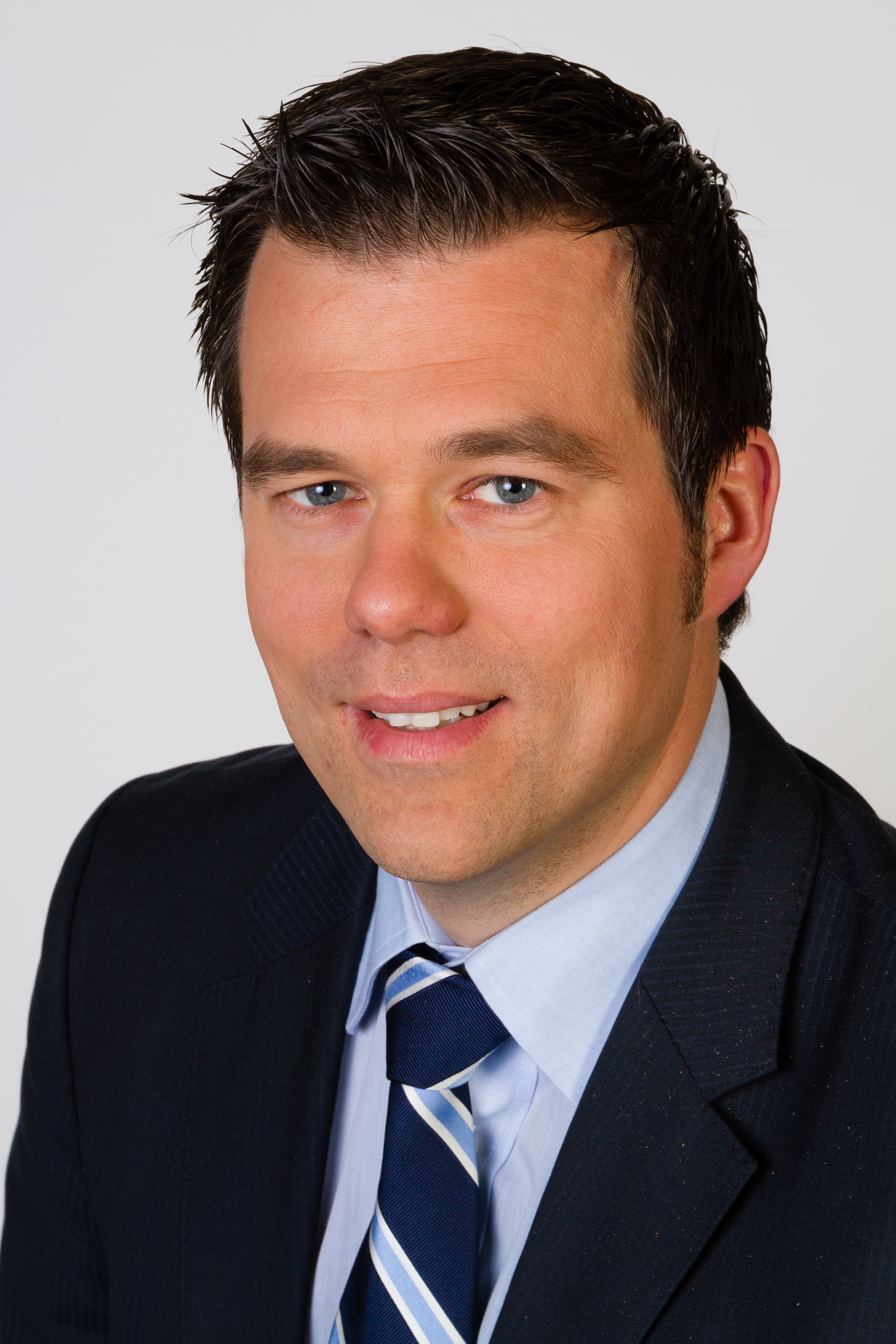
- Hocker in 2013

Member of the Bundestag for Lower Saxony
- In office 24 October 2017 – March 2025
- Constituency: FDP List

Personal details
- Born: 30 June 1975 (age 51) Bremen, West Germany
- Party: Free Democratic Party
- Education: University of Bremen

Gero Clemens Hocker (born 30 June 1975) is a German economist and politician of the Free Democratic Party (FDP) who served as a member of the Bundestag from the state of Lower Saxony from 2017 to 2025.

In addition to his parliamentary work, Hocker briefly served as Parliamentary State Secretary in the Federal Ministry of Transport and Digital Infrastructure under minister Volker Wissing in the coalition government of Chancellor Olaf Scholz from September to November 2024.

== Early life and career ==
Hocker graduated from high school in 1994 and subsequently completed his basic military service. From 1995 to 1998 he trained as a bank clerk at the Sparkasse Bremen.

After his training, Hocker worked in the marketing department. He also studied economics at the University of Bremen from 1998 to 2003. During his studies he completed various internships in Australia, China and New York. He then worked as an investment consultant at Nordwestfinanz Bremen until 2006. From 2007 until 2008, he was a personal advisor to Carsten Maschmeyer.

== Political career ==
=== Career in state politics ===
From 2009 to 2017 Hocker served as a member of the State Parliament of Lower Saxony. From 2012 to 2018 he was Secretary General of the FDP Lower Saxony, under the leadership of chairman Stefan Birkner. In April 2018 he was elected to the state executive committee as an assessor.

=== Member of the German Parliament, 2017–2025 ===
In the 2017 federal election, Hocker ran for election in the Osterholz - Verden constituency and was elected to the Bundestag via the FDP's Lower Saxony state list. In parliament, he served on the Committee on Food and Agriculture. He was also his parliamentary group's spokesman for agriculture and nutrition.

On 17 January 2019, Hocker was elected President of the German Fisheries Association.

In the negotiations to form a so-called traffic light coalition of the Social Democratic Party (SPD), the Green Party and the FDP following the 2021 German elections, Hocker was part of his party's delegation in the working group on agriculture and nutrition, co-chaired by Till Backhaus, Renate Künast and Carina Konrad.

In 2023, Hocker was one of the candidates to succeed Stefan Birkner as chair of the FDP in Lower Saxony; in an internal vote at a party convention, he ultimately lost against Konstantin Kuhle.

== Other activities ==
- Nuclear Waste Disposal Fund (KENFO), Alternate Member of the Board of Trustees (since 2022)
- St Barbara Foundation, Member of the Board of Trustees
