= Ulla Ihnen =

German politician

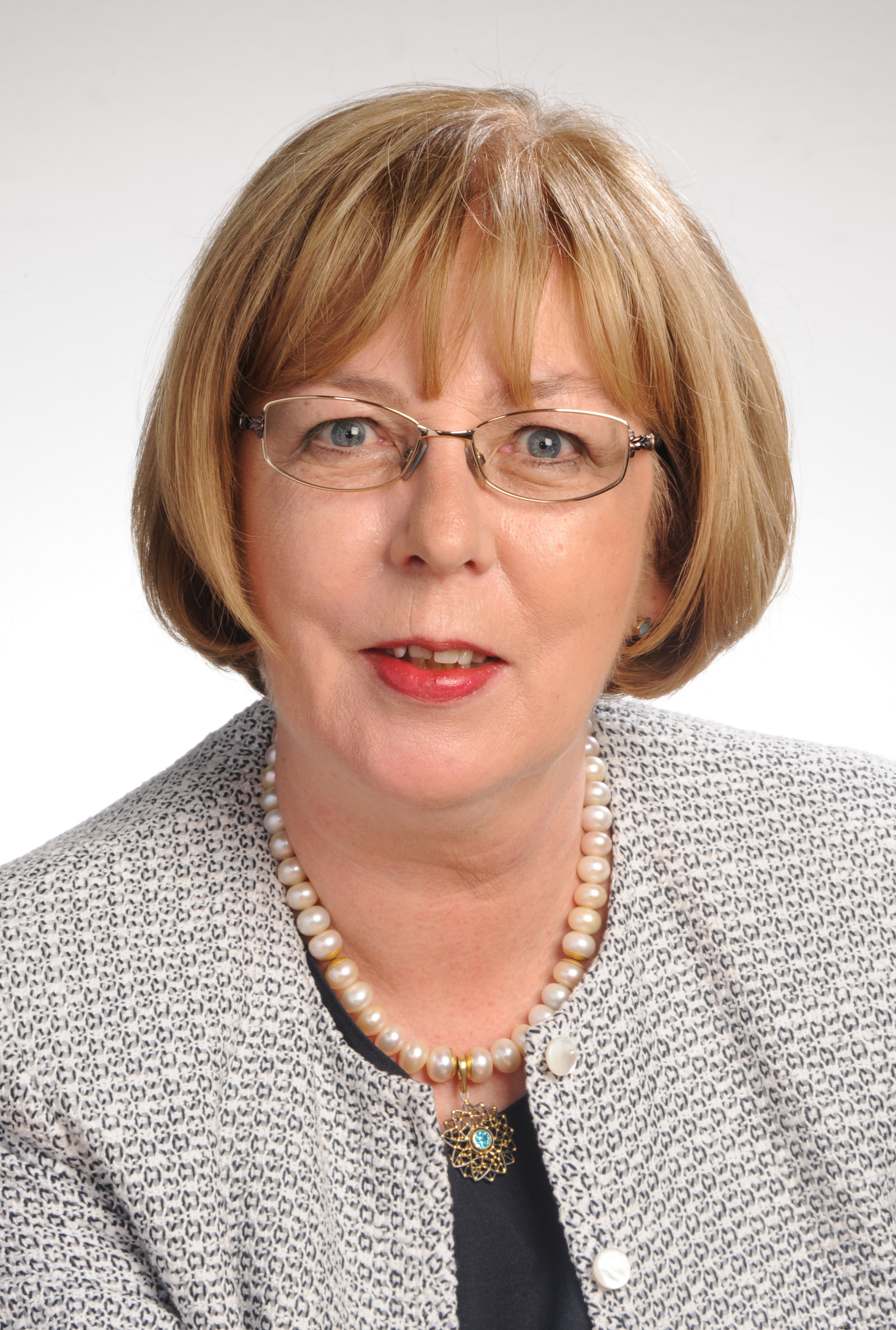
- Ulla Ihnen in 2019

Member of the Bundestag
- In office 2017–2021

Personal details
- Born: 6 January 1956 (age 70) Wittmund, West Germany (now Germany)
- Party: FDP
- Education: University of Göttingen

Ulla Ihnen (born 6 January 1956) is a German politician of the Free Democratic Party (FDP) who served as a member of the Bundestag from the state of Lower Saxony from 2017 to 2021.

== Early life and career ==
Having grown up in Wittmund, Ihnen graduated from Mariengymnasium Jever and studied law from 1974 onwards at the University of Göttingen. She completed her legal clerkship after the first state examination. After the second state examination she worked as a lawyer in Wittmund from 1983 to 1985.

In autumn 1985 Ihnen took up a position at the Deutsche Bundesbank. In 1988 she moved to the State Ministry for Federal and European Affairs of Lower Saxony. At the end of 1989 she moved to Brussels on a professional basis as a national expert at the European Commission. At the end of 1991 she was entrusted with the establishment and management of the Office of the State of Mecklenburg-Vorpommern at the European Union in Brussels. In 1997 she was elected First County Councillor in the district of Uelzen. Further activities in the Lower Saxony state administration followed.

In January 2012, minister Stefan Birkner appointed her State Secretary in Lower Saxony's State Ministry for Environment, Climate Protection and Energy. With the change of government following the 2013 elections she was put into temporary retirement.

== Political career ==
Ihnen has been a member of the FDP since 1977.

Ihnen became member of the Bundestag in the 2017 German federal election. She was a member of the Budget Committee and the Audit Committee. In this capacity, she served as her parliamentary group's rapporteur on the annual budget of the Federal Ministry of Food and Agriculture from 2018.

== Other activities ==
- Nuclear Waste Disposal Fund (KENFO), Member of the Board of Trustees (2018–2022)
- Deutsche Gesellschaft für Internationale Zusammenarbeit (GIZ), Member of the Board of Trustees
- Norddeutscher Rundfunk (NDR), Member of the Broadcasting Council
- Soroptimist International (SI), Member
