= Elke Twesten =

German politician (born 1963)

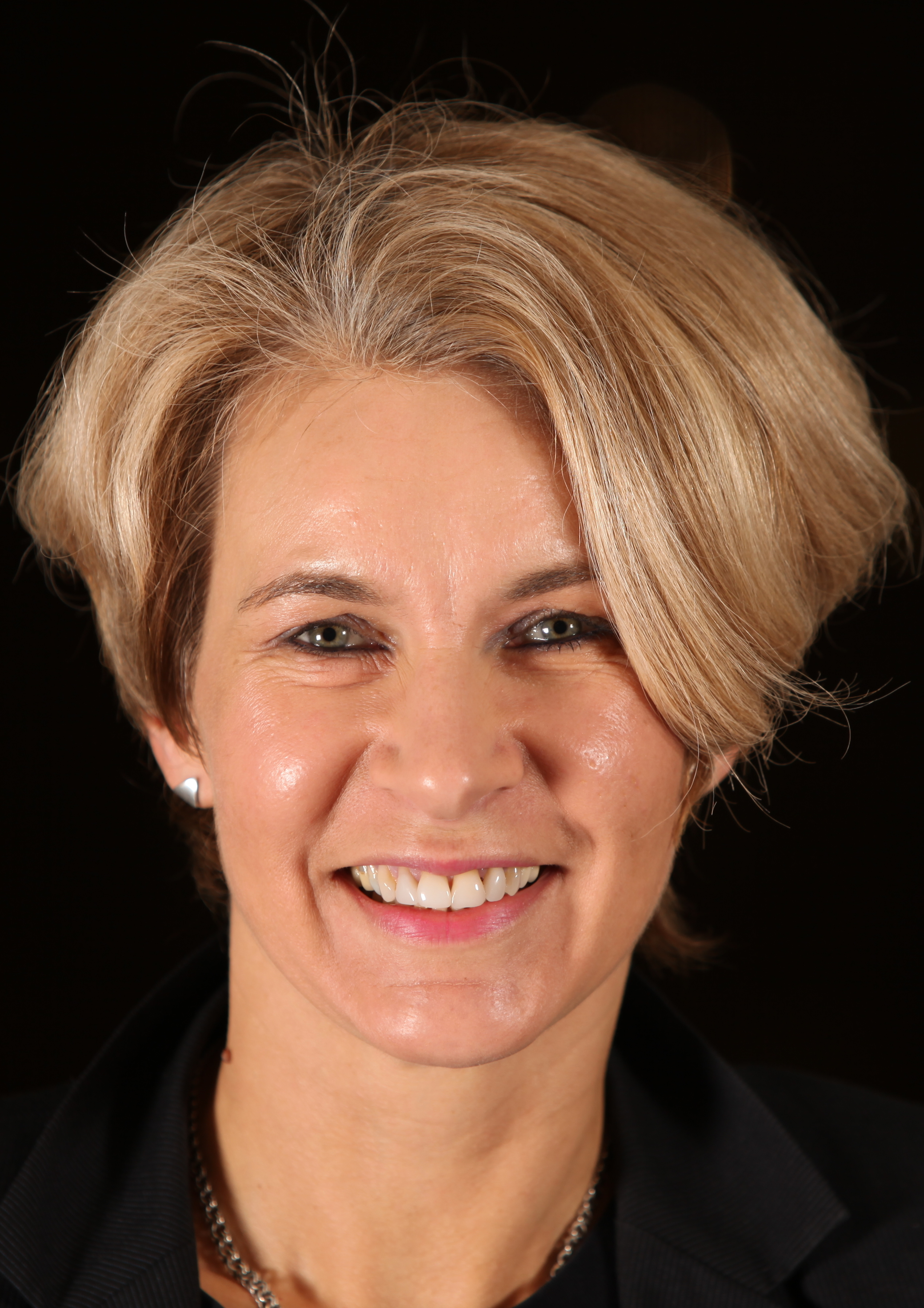
- Twesten in 2009

Member of the Landtag of Lower Saxony
- In office 26 February 2008 – 14 November 2017
- Preceded by: multi-member district
- Succeeded by: multi-member district
- Constituency: Alliance 90/The Greens List

Member of the Rotenburg District Council
- In office 1 November 2006 – 31 October 2021
- Preceded by: multi-member district
- Succeeded by: multi-member district
- Constituency: Alliance 90/The Greens List

Personal details
- Born: Elke Twesten; 7 July 1963 (age 63) Scheeßel, Germany
- Party: CDU (2017–present)
- Other political affiliations: The Greens (1997–2017)
- Children: 3
- Education: Hochschule des Bundes für öffentliche Verwaltung
- Website: www.elke-twesten.de

Elke Twesten (born 7 July 1963 in Scheeßel) is a German politician for the CDU in Lower Saxony who switched parties from the Alliance 90/The Greens in 2017.

== Career ==
Twesten previously worked in the Hamburg Customs Administration. She was elected to the Lower Saxon Landtag in 2008. Since 2013, she has been Secretary of the Landtag. She is also spokesperson for women in the parliament.

Twesten defected to the CDU from the Greens in August 2017, thus depriving the Lower Saxony Parliament's SDP/Green coalition of its one-seat majority and triggering an early election in October 2017.

== Personal life ==
Twesten is married and has three daughters.
