= Goslar – Northeim – Göttingen II =

Federal electoral district of Germany

52 Goslar – Northeim – Göttingen II
- Electoral district for the Bundestag
- Goslar – Northeim – Göttingen II in 2025
- State: Lower Saxony
- Population: 250,400 (2019)
- Electorate: 197,519 (2021)
- Major settlements: Goslar; Einbeck; Northeim
- Area: 2,125.5 km^{2}

Current electoral district
- Created: 1949
- Party: SPD
- Member: Frauke Heiligenstadt
- Elected: 2021, 2025

Goslar – Northeim – Göttingen II is an electoral constituency (German: Wahlkreis) represented in the Bundestag. It elects one member via first-past-the-post voting. Under the current constituency numbering system, it is designated as constituency 52. It is located in southern Lower Saxony, comprising most of the districts of Goslar, Northeim, and the former Osterode (now part of Göttingen district).

Goslar – Northeim – Göttingen II was created for the inaugural 1949 federal election. Since 2021, it has been represented by Frauke Heiligenstadt of the Social Democratic Party (SPD).

== Geography ==
Goslar – Northeim – Göttingen II is located in southern Lower Saxony. As of the 2021 federal election, it comprises the district of Goslar excluding the Samtgemeinde of Lutter am Barenberge and municipalities of Langelsheim, Liebenburg, and Seesen; the district of Northeim excluding the municipalities of Bodenfelde and Uslar and Solling area; and the area of the now-abolished district of Osterode excluding the municipalities of Bad Lauterberg, Bad Sachsa, and Herzberg am Harz (now part of the Göttingen district).

== History ==
Goslar – Northeim – Göttingen II was created in 1949, then known as Northeim – Einbeck – Duderstadt. In the 1965 through 1976 elections, it was named Northeim. In the 1980 through 1998 elections, it was named Northeim – Osterode. It was renamed Goslar – Northeim – Osterode at the 2002 election and acquired its current name at the 2025 election. In the inaugural Bundestag election, it was Lower Saxony constituency 33 in the numbering system. From 1953 through 1961, it was number 55. From 1965 through 1998, it was number 48. In the 2002 and 2005 elections, it was number 52. In the 2009 election, it was number 53. Since the 2013 election, it has been number 52.

Originally, the constituency comprised the districts of Northeim, Einbeck, and Duderstadt. In the 1965 through 1976 elections, it comprised the district of Northeim excluding the Fürstenhagen municipality, as well as the districts of Osterode, Blankenburg, and Zellerfeld. In the 1980 through 1998 elections, it comprised the district of Northeim and the municipalities of Osterode am Harz and Herzberg am Harz and the Samtgemeinden of Bad Grund and Hattorf from the Osterode district. It acquired its current borders in the 2002 election.

Election	No.	Name	Borders
1949	33	Northeim – Einbeck – Duderstadt	Northeim district; Einbeck district; Duderstadt district
1953	55	Northeim – Einbeck – Duderstadt	Northeim district; Einbeck district; Duderstadt district
1957	55	Northeim – Einbeck – Duderstadt	Northeim district; Einbeck district; Duderstadt district
1961	55	Northeim – Einbeck – Duderstadt	Northeim district; Einbeck district; Duderstadt district
1965	48	Northeim	Northeim district (excluding Fürstenhagen municipality); Osterode district; Blankenburg district; Zellerfeld district
1969	48	Northeim	Northeim district (excluding Fürstenhagen municipality); Osterode district; Blankenburg district; Zellerfeld district
1972	48	Northeim	Northeim district (excluding Fürstenhagen municipality); Osterode district; Blankenburg district; Zellerfeld district
1976	48	Northeim	Northeim district (excluding Fürstenhagen municipality); Osterode district; Blankenburg district; Zellerfeld district
1980	48	Northeim – Osterode	Northeim district; Osterode district (only Osterode am Harz and Herzberg am Harz municipalities and Bad Grund and Hattorf Samtgemeinden)
1983	48	Northeim – Osterode	Northeim district; Osterode district (only Osterode am Harz and Herzberg am Harz municipalities and Bad Grund and Hattorf Samtgemeinden)
1987	48	Northeim – Osterode	Northeim district; Osterode district (only Osterode am Harz and Herzberg am Harz municipalities and Bad Grund and Hattorf Samtgemeinden)
1990	48	Northeim – Osterode	Northeim district; Osterode district (only Osterode am Harz and Herzberg am Harz municipalities and Bad Grund and Hattorf Samtgemeinden)
1994	48	Northeim – Osterode	Northeim district; Osterode district (only Osterode am Harz and Herzberg am Harz municipalities and Bad Grund and Hattorf Samtgemeinden)
1998	48	Northeim – Osterode	Northeim district; Osterode district (only Osterode am Harz and Herzberg am Harz municipalities and Bad Grund and Hattorf Samtgemeinden)
2002	52	Goslar – Northeim – Osterode	Goslar district (excluding Langelsheim, Liebenburg, and Seesen municipalities and Lutter am Barenberge Samtgemeinde); Northeim district (excluding Bodenfelde and Uslar municipalities and the Solling area); Göttingen district (only Bad Grund, Osterode am Harz, and Walkenried municipalities, the Harz area, and Hattorf am Harz Samtgemeinde)
2005	52	Goslar – Northeim – Osterode	Goslar district (excluding Langelsheim, Liebenburg, and Seesen municipalities and Lutter am Barenberge Samtgemeinde); Northeim district (excluding Bodenfelde and Uslar municipalities and the Solling area); Göttingen district (only Bad Grund, Osterode am Harz, and Walkenried municipalities, the Harz area, and Hattorf am Harz Samtgemeinde)
2009	53	Goslar – Northeim – Osterode	Goslar district (excluding Langelsheim, Liebenburg, and Seesen municipalities and Lutter am Barenberge Samtgemeinde); Northeim district (excluding Bodenfelde and Uslar municipalities and the Solling area); Göttingen district (only Bad Grund, Osterode am Harz, and Walkenried municipalities, the Harz area, and Hattorf am Harz Samtgemeinde)
2013	52	Goslar – Northeim – Osterode	Goslar district (excluding Langelsheim, Liebenburg, and Seesen municipalities and Lutter am Barenberge Samtgemeinde); Northeim district (excluding Bodenfelde and Uslar municipalities and the Solling area); Göttingen district (only Bad Grund, Osterode am Harz, and Walkenried municipalities, the Harz area, and Hattorf am Harz Samtgemeinde)
2017	52	Goslar – Northeim – Osterode	Goslar district (excluding Langelsheim, Liebenburg, and Seesen municipalities and Lutter am Barenberge Samtgemeinde); Northeim district (excluding Bodenfelde and Uslar municipalities and the Solling area); Göttingen district (only Bad Grund, Osterode am Harz, and Walkenried municipalities, the Harz area, and Hattorf am Harz Samtgemeinde)
2021	52	Goslar – Northeim – Osterode	Goslar district (excluding Langelsheim, Liebenburg, and Seesen municipalities and Lutter am Barenberge Samtgemeinde); Northeim district (excluding Bodenfelde and Uslar municipalities and the Solling area); Göttingen district (only Bad Grund, Osterode am Harz, and Walkenried municipalities, the Harz area, and Hattorf am Harz Samtgemeinde)
2025	52	Goslar – Northeim – Göttingen II	Goslar district (excluding Langelsheim, Liebenburg, and Seesen municipalities and Lutter am Barenberge Samtgemeinde); Northeim district (excluding Bodenfelde and Uslar municipalities and the Solling area); Göttingen district (only Bad Grund, Osterode am Harz, and Walkenried municipalities, the Harz area, and Hattorf am Harz Samtgemeinde)

== Members ==
The constituency has been held by the Social Democratic Party (SPD) during all but two Bundestag terms since 1949. Its first representative was Martin Schmidt of the SPD, who served from 1949 to 1957. Karl Hackethal of the Christian Democratic Union (CDU) won the constituency in 1957 and served a single term. Former member Schmidt returned in 1961 and served until 1987. He was succeeded by Edith Niehuis, who served until 2002. Wilhelm Priesmeier was then representative until 2017. In 2017, Roy Kühne of the CDU was elected representative. In 2021, Frauke Heiligenstadt regained it for the SPD.

Election	Member	Party	%
1949	Martin Schmidt	SPD	30.4
1953	Martin Schmidt	SPD	30.7
1957	Karl Hackethal	CDU	46.4
1961	Martin Schmidt	SPD	40.4
1965	Martin Schmidt	SPD	48.6
1969	Martin Schmidt	SPD	52.3
1972	Martin Schmidt	SPD	56.9
1976	Martin Schmidt	SPD	52.7
1980	Martin Schmidt	SPD	54.1
1983	Martin Schmidt	SPD	48.7
1987	Edith Niehuis	SPD	49.2
1990	Edith Niehuis	SPD	46.8
1994	Edith Niehuis	SPD	49.3
1998	Edith Niehuis	SPD	56.8
2002	Wilhelm Priesmeier	SPD	52.4
2005	Wilhelm Priesmeier	SPD	50.5
2009	Wilhelm Priesmeier	SPD	39.1
2013	Wilhelm Priesmeier	SPD	42.4
2017	Roy Kühne	CDU	39.8
2021	Frauke Heiligenstadt	SPD	36.7
2025	Frauke Heiligenstadt	SPD	30.4

== Election results ==
=== 2025 election ===
Federal election (2025): Goslar – Northeim – Osterode
Notes:	Blue background denotes the winner of the electorate vote. Pink background denotes a candidate elected from their party list. Yellow background denotes an electorate win by a list member, or other incumbent. A ✓ or ✗ denotes status of any incumbent, win or lose respectively.						
Party	Candidate	Votes	%	±%	Party votes	%	±%
SPD	✓ Frauke Heiligenstadt	46,873	30.4	▼6.3	38,452	24.9	▼13.0
CDU	Constantin Weigel	46,699	30.3	▼2.9	43,211	27.9	▲4.3
AfD	Waldemar Rau	30,491	19.8	▲11.9	30,927	20.0	▲11.7
Greens	Karoline Otte	11,922	7.7	▼2.8	13,463	8.7	▼3.3
Left	Uta Plettner-Voigt	9,186	6.0	▼3.3	10,715	6.9	▲3.9
BSW					6,034	3.9	
FDP	Ali Abo Hamoud	3,999	2.6	▼3.6	6,116	4.0	▼6.0
FW	Nils Fischer	2,557	1.7	▲0.2	1,171	0.8	▼0.1
Volt	Bastian Busch	1,684	1.1		882	0.6	▲0.4
BD	Jörg Gehrke	751	0.5		246	0.2	
PARTEI					723	0.5	▼0.4
dieBasis				▼1.3	358	0.2	▼0.8
Pirates					245	0.2	▼0.2
Humanists					100	0.1	0.0
MLPD					24	0.0	0.0
Team Todenhöfer							▼0.2
ÖDP							▼0.1
Informal votes		1,421			971		
Total valid votes		154,162			154,612		
Turnout		155,583	81.3	▲8.6			
SPD hold	Majority	174	0.1				

=== 2021 election ===
Federal election (2021): Goslar – Northeim – Osterode
Notes:	Blue background denotes the winner of the electorate vote. Pink background denotes a candidate elected from their party list. Yellow background denotes an electorate win by a list member, or other incumbent. A ✓ or ✗ denotes status of any incumbent, win or lose respectively.						
Party	Candidate	Votes	%	±%	Party votes	%	±%
SPD	Frauke Heiligenstadt	52,129	36.7	▲1.9	53,876	37.9	▲5.8
CDU	✗ Roy Kühne	47,196	33.2	▼6.5	33,614	23.6	▼8.5
Greens	Karoline Otte	14,954	10.5	▲5.1	17,118	12.0	▲5.4
AfD	Jens Kestner	11,240	7.9	▼1.4	11,819	8.3	▼1.8
FDP	Jan Schwede	8,827	6.2	▲1.2	14,239	10.0	▲0.8
Left	Eva Brunnemann	3,835	2.7	▼3.0	4,251	3.0	▼3.4
Tierschutzpartei					1,840	1.3	▲0.3
FW	Christian Warzecha	2,031	1.4		1,228	0.9	▲0.5
dieBasis	Janine Reinecke	1,797	1.3		1,505	1.1	
PARTEI					1,184	0.8	0.0
Pirates					439	0.3	0.0
Team Todenhöfer					325	0.2	
Volt					249	0.2	
NPD					193	0.1	▼0.3
Humanists					118	0.1	
V-Partei3					97	0.1	0.0
ÖDP					84	0.1	0.0
du.					67	0.0	
Independent	Jürgen Schäuble-Leopold	58	0.0				
DKP					21	0.0	Steady
LKR					25	0.0	
MLPD					23	0.0	Steady
Informal votes		1,544			1,296		
Total valid votes		142,067			142,315		
Turnout		143,611	72.7	▼1.7			
SPD gain from CDU	Majority	4,933	3.5				

=== 2017 election ===
Federal election (2017): Goslar – Northeim – Osterode
Notes:	Blue background denotes the winner of the electorate vote. Pink background denotes a candidate elected from their party list. Yellow background denotes an electorate win by a list member, or other incumbent. A ✓ or ✗ denotes status of any incumbent, win or lose respectively.						
Party	Candidate	Votes	%	±%	Party votes	%	±%
CDU	Roy Kühne	59,391	39.8	▼2.3	48,131	32.1	▼5.7
SPD	Marcus Seidel	51,953	34.8	▼7.6	48,016	32.1	▼6.0
AfD	Jens Kestner	13,937	9.3		15,132	10.1	▲6.2
Left	Lukas David Jacobs	8,525	5.7	▲1.1	9,521	6.4	▲1.3
Greens	Viola von Cramon-Taubadel	8,128	5.4	▲0.1	9,929	6.6	▼0.3
FDP	Nicole Langer	7,438	5.0	▲3.4	13,734	9.2	▲5.0
Tierschutzpartei					1,512	1.0	▲0.3
PARTEI					1,246	0.8	
NPD					595	0.4	▼0.6
FW					513	0.3	▼0.2
Pirates					426	0.3	▼1.2
DM					329	0.2	
BGE					199	0.1	
DiB					173	0.1	
V-Partei³					169	0.1	
ÖDP					102	0.1	
MLPD					36	0.0	0.0
DKP					27	0.0	
Informal votes		1,605			1,187		
Total valid votes		149,372			149,790		
Turnout		150,977	74.4	▲2.7			
CDU gain from SPD	Majority	7,438	5.0				

=== 2013 election ===
Federal election (2013): Goslar – Northeim – Osterode
Notes:	Blue background denotes the winner of the electorate vote. Pink background denotes a candidate elected from their party list. Yellow background denotes an electorate win by a list member, or other incumbent. A ✓ or ✗ denotes status of any incumbent, win or lose respectively.						
Party	Candidate	Votes	%	±%	Party votes	%	±%
SPD	✓ Wilhelm Priesmeier	62,209	42.4	▲3.2	55,985	38.0	▲5.0
CDU	Roy Kühne	61,723	42.0	▲6.6	55,775	37.9	▲7.9
Greens	Viola von Cramon-Taubadel	7,833	5.3	▼0.9	10,141	6.9	▼1.5
Left	Michael Ohse	6,805	4.6	▼4.5	7,475	5.1	▼4.6
AfD					5,733	3.9	
Pirates	Meinhart Ramaswamy	2,373	1.6		2,141	1.5	▼0.4
FDP	Olaf Torsten Franz	2,249	1.5	▼6.7	6,099	4.1	▼9.8
NPD	Michael Ellies	1,967	1.3	▼0.4	1,493	1.0	▼0.5
FW	Georg Sponfeldner	1,402	1.0		835	0.6	
Tierschutzpartei					1,086	0.7	▼0.1
Independent	Lothar Baumelt	269	0.2				
PRO					241	0.2	
PBC					134	0.1	
REP					93	0.1	
MLPD					33	0.0	0.0
Informal votes		2,599			2,165		
Total valid votes		146,830			147,264		
Turnout		149,429	71.7	▼1.2			
SPD hold	Majority	486	0.4	▼3.3			

=== 2009 election ===
Federal election (2009): Goslar – Northeim – Osterode
Notes:	Blue background denotes the winner of the electorate vote. Pink background denotes a candidate elected from their party list. Yellow background denotes an electorate win by a list member, or other incumbent. A ✓ or ✗ denotes status of any incumbent, win or lose respectively.						
Party	Candidate	Votes	%	±%	Party votes	%	±%
SPD	✓ Wilhelm Priesmeier	60,107	39.1	▼11.4	50,912	33.0	▼12.9
CDU	Hans Georg Faust	54,451	35.5	▼1.3	46,256	30.0	▼1.3
Left	Rüdiger Wohltmann	14,083	9.2	▲4.9	14,988	9.7	▲4.8
FDP	Christian Eberl	12,719	8.3	▲4.3	21,481	13.9	▲4.5
Greens	Viola von Cramon-Taubadel	9,624	6.3	▲3.3	12,983	8.4	▲2.7
Pirates					2,787	1.8	
NPD	Patrick Kallweit	2,599	1.7	▲0.3	2,352	1.5	▲0.1
Tierschutzpartei					1,247	0.8	▲0.2
RRP					866	0.6	
ÖDP					144	0.1	
DVU					131	0.1	
MLPD					27	0.0	0.0
Informal votes		2,638			2,047		
Total valid votes		153,583			154,174		
Turnout		156,221	72.9	▼6.2			
SPD hold	Majority	5,656	3.7	▼10.0			

=== 2005 election ===
Federal election (2005):Goslar – Northeim – Osterode
Notes:	Blue background denotes the winner of the electorate vote. Pink background denotes a candidate elected from their party list. Yellow background denotes an electorate win by a list member, or other incumbent. A ✓ or ✗ denotes status of any incumbent, win or lose respectively.						
Party	Candidate	Votes	%	±%	Party votes	%	±%
SPD	✓ Wilhelm Priesmeier	86,432	50.5	▼1.9	78,632	45.9	▼5.0
CDU	Hans Faust	62,869	36.8	▲1.1	53,595	31.3	▼2.4
Left	Michael Ohse	7,359	4.3	▲3.1	8,402	4.9	▲3.8
FDP	Jürgen Lauterbach	6,791	4.0	▼2.4	16,163	9.4	▲2.4
Greens	Phu-Hai Ngo	5,145	3.0	▼1.0	9,799	5.7	▲0.3
NPD	Patrick Kallweit	2,401	1.4		2,413	1.4	▲1.1
Tierschutzpartei					1,020	0.6	▲0.2
GRAUEN					588	0.3	▲0.2
PBC					290	0.2	0.0
Pro German Center – Pro D-Mark Initiative					169	0.1	
BüSo					95	0.1	0.0
MLPD					53	0.0	
Informal votes		2,979			2,757		
Total valid votes		170,997			171,219		
Turnout		173,976	79.1	▼1.2			
SPD hold	Majority	23,563	13.7				
