= Ihnen =

Ihnen is a surname. Notable people with the surname include:

- Ulla Ihnen (born 1956), German politician
- Wiard Ihnen (1897–1979), American art director
