= Grant Hendrik Tonne =

Lower Saxony Minister for Education

Grant Hendrik Tonne MdL MdBR
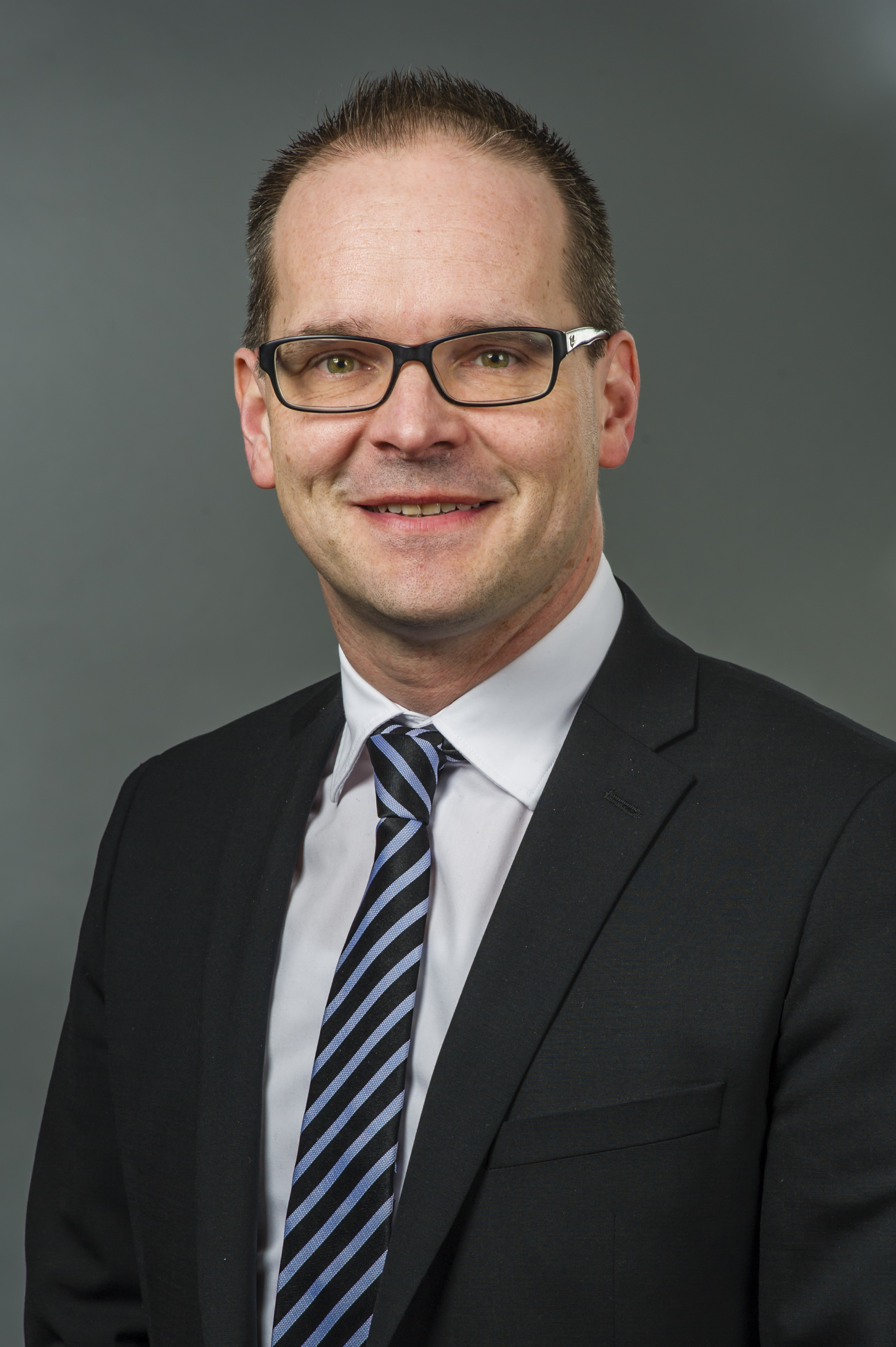
- Tonne in 2018

Lower Saxony Minister for Education
- In office 22 November 2017 – 2022
- Minister-President: Stephan Weil; Olaf Lies
- Preceded by: Frauke Heiligenstadt

Member of the Landtag of Lower Saxony
- Incumbent
- Assumed office 23 April 2020
- Preceded by: Dirk Adomat

Personal details
- Born: 22 June 1976 (age 50) Bad Oeynhausen, West Germany
- Party: Social Democratic Party
- Children: 4
- Education: University of Bremen
- Website: ghtonne.de

Grant Hendrik Tonne (born 22 June 1976) is a German politician who served as Minister for Education for Lower Saxony from 2017 to 2022. Since 2020 he has been a member of the State Parliament of Lower Saxony.

Tonne has been one of the state's representatives on the German Bundesrat since 2017. He is a member of the German-Polish Friendship Group set up in cooperation with the Senate of Poland.

== Early life and education ==
Tonne was born in Bad Oeynhausen on 22 June 1976 and grew up in Leese.

After finishing his Abitur at the Städtisches Gymnasium Petershagen in 1995, he studied law at the University of Bremen until 2000, when he finished his first Staatsexam. In 2007, Tonne finished his second Staatsexam at the Higher Regional Court of Celle.

== Political career ==
Tonne joined the Jusos in 1996.

From 2006 until 2018, Tonne served as Mayor of Leese and was succeeded by Henning Olthage.

=== State Minister of Education, 2017–2022 ===
After the Lower Saxony state elections in 2017, Tonne was sworn in as State Minister of Education at the constituent session of the 18th State Parliament of Lower Saxony on 22 November 2017.

== Personal life ==
Tonne is married to Monika Tonne-Herrmann, whom he has four children with.
