= Christian Grascha =

German politician (born 1978)

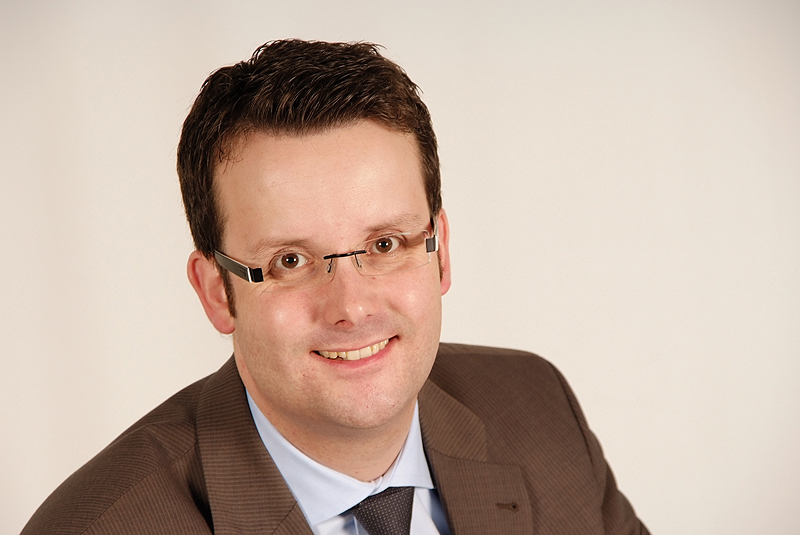
Grascha im 2009

Christian Grascha (born 16 October 1978) is a German politician for the Free Democratic Party.

== Political career ==
Grascha was born in Einbeck. He joined the Lower Saxon Landtag in 2008 as a replacement for Stefan Birkner.

In the negotiations to form a so-called traffic light coalition of the Social Democratic Party (SPD), the Green Party and the FDP following the 2021 federal elections, Grascha was part of his party's delegation in the working group on financial regulation and the national budget, co-chaired by Doris Ahnen, Lisa Paus and Christian Dürr.

== Other activities ==
- Norddeutsche Landesbank (NORD/LB), Member of the Advisory Board
