= Stefan Wenzel =

German agricultural economist and politician (born 1962)

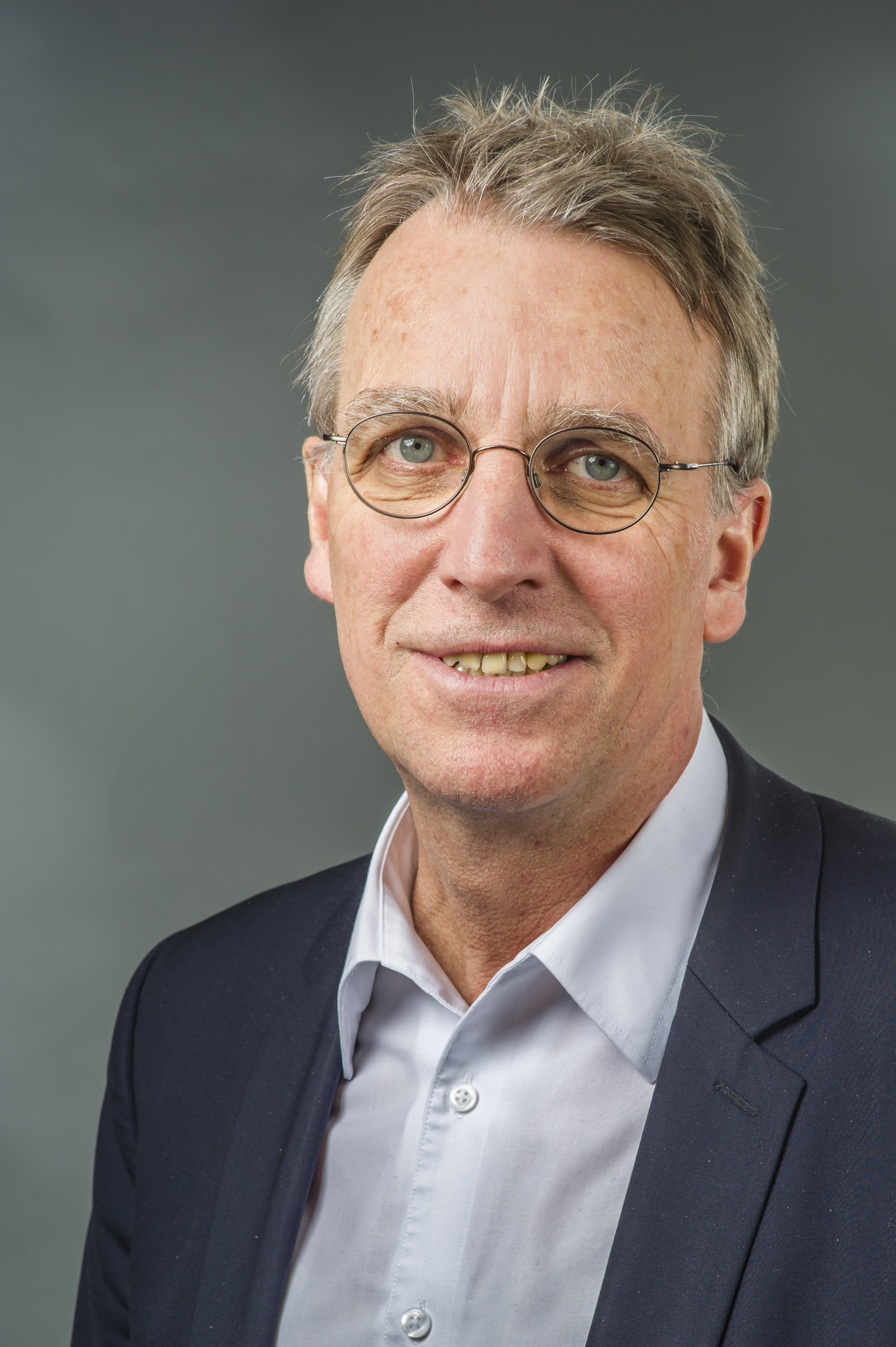
- Wenzel in 2018

Parliamentary State Secretary for Economic Affairs and Climate Action
- In office 14 July 2022 – 6 May 2025 Serving with: Franziska Brantner; Michael Kellner
- Chancellor: Olaf Scholz
- Minister: Robert Habeck
- Preceded by: Oliver Krischer

Member of the Bundestag
- In office 2021–2025

Minister of the Environment, Energy and Climate Protection of Lower Saxony
- Minister-President: Stephan Weil
- In office 19 February 2013 – 22 November 2017
- Preceded by: Stefan Birkner
- Succeeded by: Olaf Lies

Personal details
- Born: 5 May 1962 (age 64) Nakskov, Denmark
- Children: 3
- Occupation: Politician

Peer Stefan Wenzel (born 5 May 1962) is a German agricultural economist and politician for the Alliance 90/The Greens who served as a member of the German Bundestag from 2021 to 2025, representing the Cuxhaven – Stade II district.

In addition to his parliamentary work, Wenzel served as Parliamentary State Secretary at the Federal Ministry for Economic Affairs and Climate Action in the coalition government of Chancellor Olaf Scholz from 2022 to 2025.

== Political career ==
=== Career in state politics ===
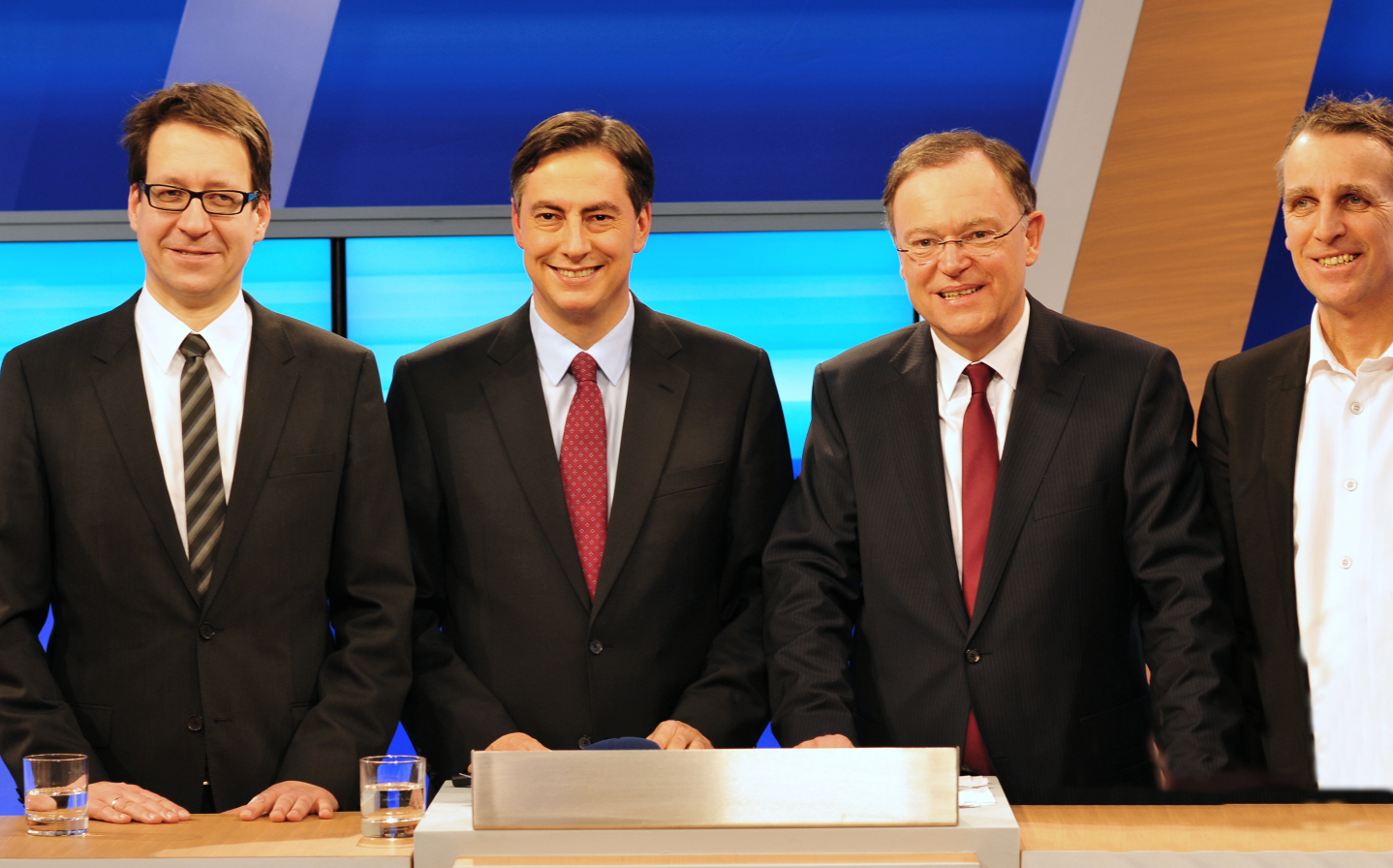
From left: Stefan Birkner, David McAllister, Stephan Weil and Wenzel in 2013

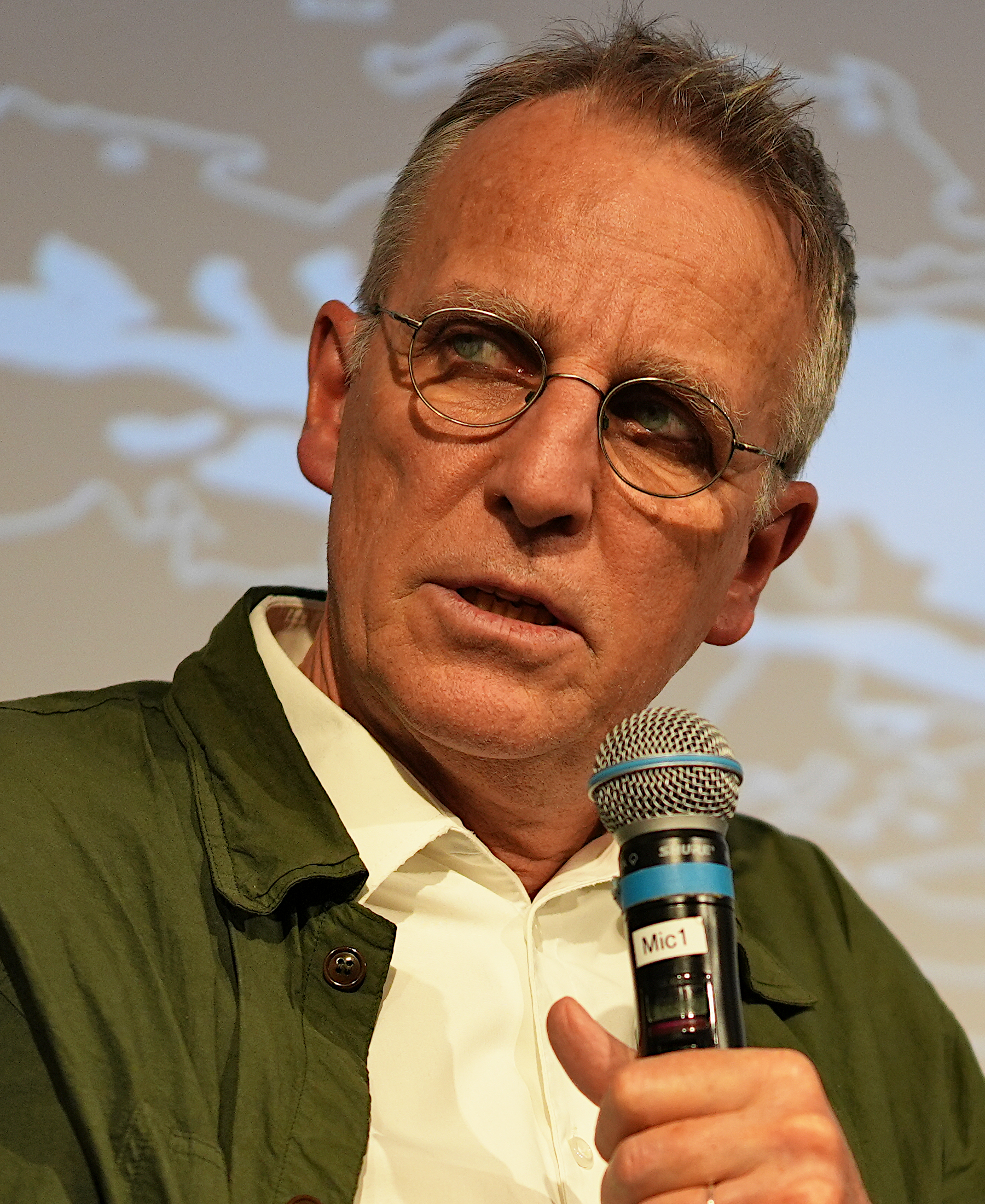
Wenzel speaking at a panel discussion on phasing out natural gas held 9 December 2024

A trained agricultural economist, Wenzel was elected to the Lower Saxon Landtag in the 1998 state elections, and has been re-elected on two occasions. In 2004 he succeeded Rebecca Harms as chairman of the Green Party's parliamentary group. Wenzel was a Green Party delegate to the Federal Convention for the purpose of electing the President of Germany in 2009 and 2017.

On 19 February 2013, Wenzel was sworn in as Deputy Minister-President and State Minister for the Environment, Energy and Climate Protection in the state government of Minister-President Stephan Weil. As one of the state's representatives at the Bundesrat, he served as chairman of the Committee on the Environment, Nature Protection and Reactor Safety.

In 2014, Wenzel led the negotiations on the future of controversial radioactive waste disposal facility in Gorleben. From 2014 and 2016, he was one of the members of Germany's temporary National Commission on the Disposal of Radioactive Waste.

When the Green Party had to leave the coalition government following 2017 state elections, Wenzel was succeeded by Olaf Lies. From 2017 until 2021, he chaired the State Parliament's Finance Committee and the Audit Committee.

=== Member of the German Parliament, 2021–present ===
In parliament, Wenzel has been serving on the Committee on European Affairs and the Committee on the Environment, Nature Conservation, Nuclear Safety and Consumer Protection. In addition to his committee assignments, he is a member of the German delegation to the Franco-German Parliamentary Assembly.

In October 2024, Wenzel announced that he would not stand in the 2025 federal elections but instead resign from active politics by the end of the parliamentary term.

== Other activities ==
- German Energy Agency (DENA), Ex-Officio Chairman of the supervisory board (since 2022)
- Evangelical Church in Germany (EKD), Member of the Synod
- German Federal Environmental Foundation (DBU), Member of the Board of Trustees
- Federal Network Agency for Electricity, Gas, Telecommunications, Post and Railway (BNetzA), Alternate Member of the Advisory Board
- Erneuerbare Energien Göttingen GmbH & Co. KG, Member of the advisory board (-2013)

== Personal life ==
Wenzel is married and has three daughters. The family lives on an estate of low-energy houses.
