= Roy Kühne =

German politician

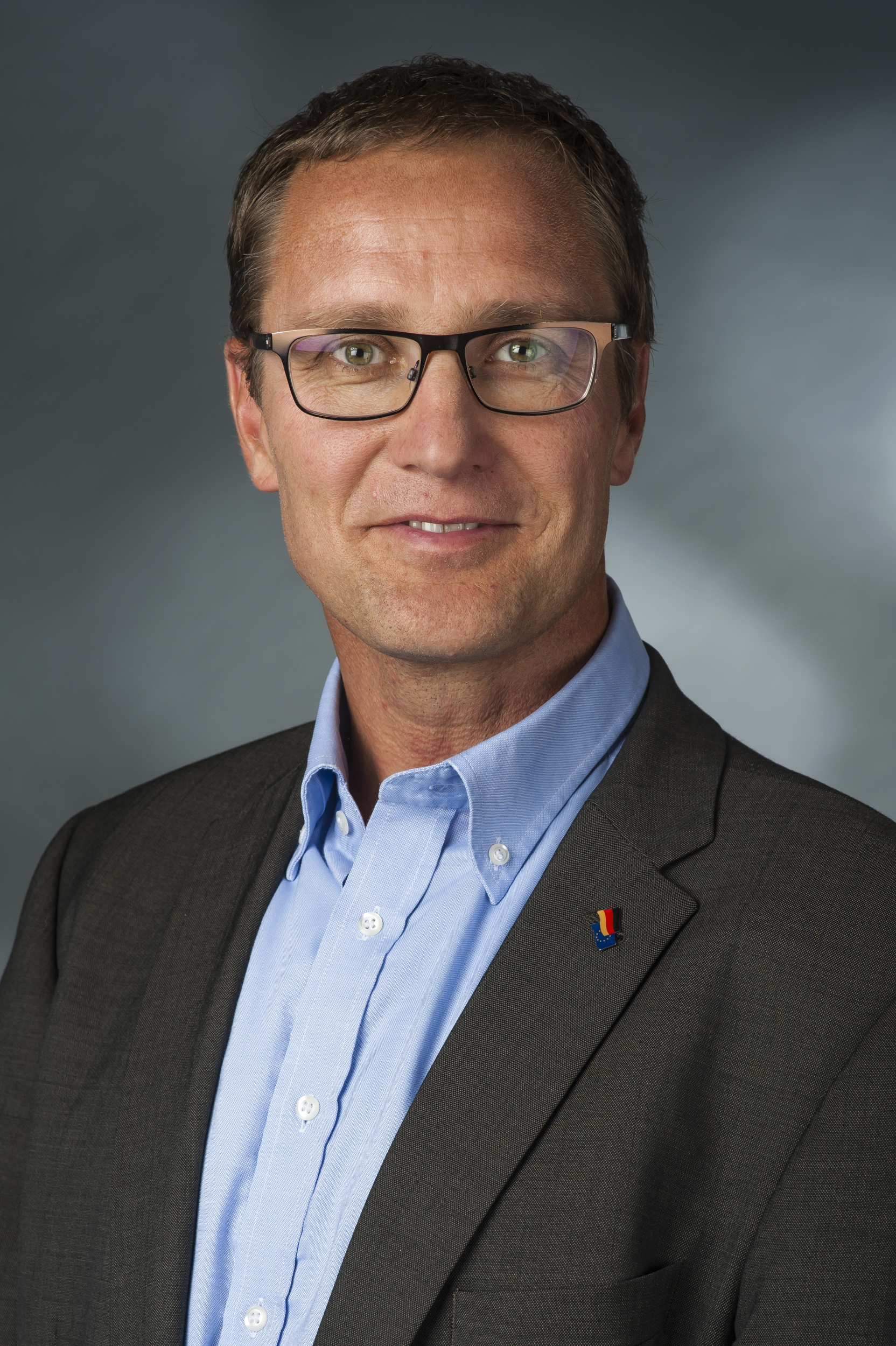
- Kühne in 2014

Member of the Bundestag; from Lower Saxony
- In office 22 October 2013 – 26 October 2021
- Preceded by: Multi-member district
- Succeeded by: Frauke Heiligenstadt
- Constituency: State list (2013–2017); Goslar – Northeim – Osterode (2017–2021)

Personal details
- Born: 27 September 1967 (age 59) Magdeburg, East Germany
- Party: Christian Democratic Union
- Children: 2
- Education: Martin Luther University Halle-Wittenberg

Roy Kühne (born 27 September 1967) is a German physiotherapist and politician of the Christian Democratic Union (CDU) who served as a member of the Bundestag from the state of Lower Saxony from 2013 to 2021.

== Political career ==
Born in Magdeburg, Saxony-Anhalt, Kühne became a member of the Bundestag in the 2013 German federal election, representing the Goslar – Northeim – Osterode district. He was a member of the Health Committee, where he served as his parliamentary group’s rapporteur on healthcare professionals. In addition to his committee assignments, he co-chaired the German-Chinese Parliamentary Friendship Group.

== Life after politics ==
After leaving politics, Kühne became the head of government relations at Bauerfeind in 2022.

== Political positions ==
In June 2017, Kühne voted against his parliamentary group’s majority and in favor of Germany’s introduction of same-sex marriage.
