= Dana Guth =

German politician

Dana Guth MdL
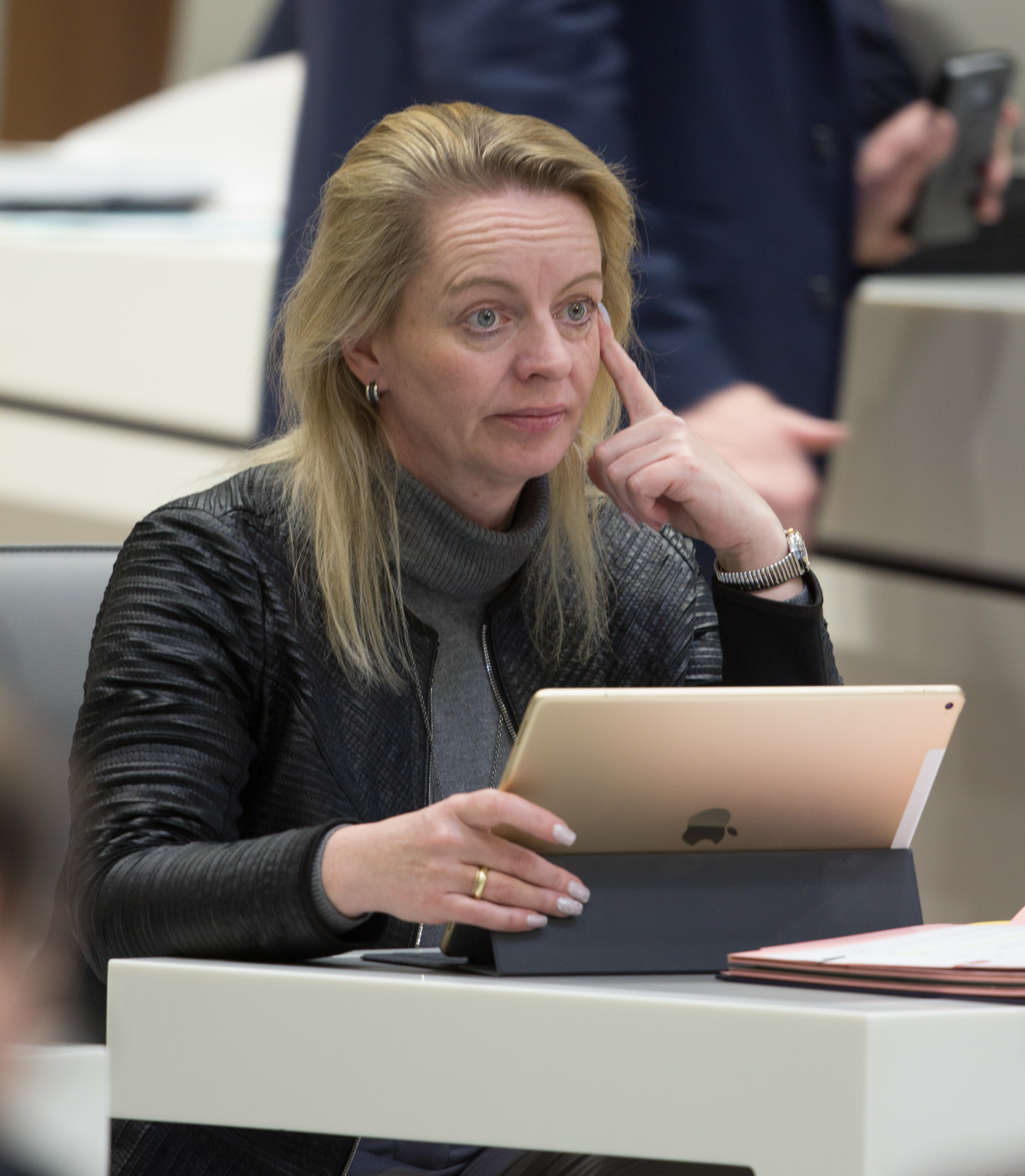
- Guth in 2018

Leader of the Alternative for Germany in Lower Saxony
- In office 7 April 2018 – 12 September 2020
- General Secretary: Jens Kestner
- Deputy: Siegfried Reichert; Harm Rykena; Klaus Wichmann
- Preceded by: Armin-Paul Hampel
- Succeeded by: Jens Kestner

Leader of the Alternative for Germany in the Landtag of Lower Saxony
- In office 17 October 2017 – 22 September 2020
- Chief Whip: Klaus Wichmann
- Deputy: Stefan Henze
- Preceded by: Position established
- Succeeded by: Position abolished

Member of the Landtag of Lower Saxony
- Incumbent
- Assumed office 14 November 2017
- Preceded by: multi-member district
- Constituency: Alternative for Germany list

Personal details
- Born: 26 July 1970 Mehrow, East Germany (now Germany)
- Party: Independent
- Other political affiliations: Liberal Conservative Reformers (2021); Alternative for Germany (2015–2020)
- Children: 2
- Education: University of Göttingen (no degree)
- Occupation: Politician; Office Clerk; Real Estate and Insurance Broker
- Website: Official website

Dana Guth is a German politician from Lower Saxony. Since the 2017 state election, she has been the leader of the Alternative for Germany party group in the Landtag of Lower Saxony. From 2018 to 2020 Guth was chairman of the AfD in the federal state of Lower Saxony.
