= 2013 Lower Saxony state election =

State election in Lower Saxony, Germany

← 2008	20 January 2013	2017 →

All 137 seats in the Landtag of Lower Saxony 69 seats needed for a majority
- Turnout: 3,574,900 (59.4%) ▲2.4%
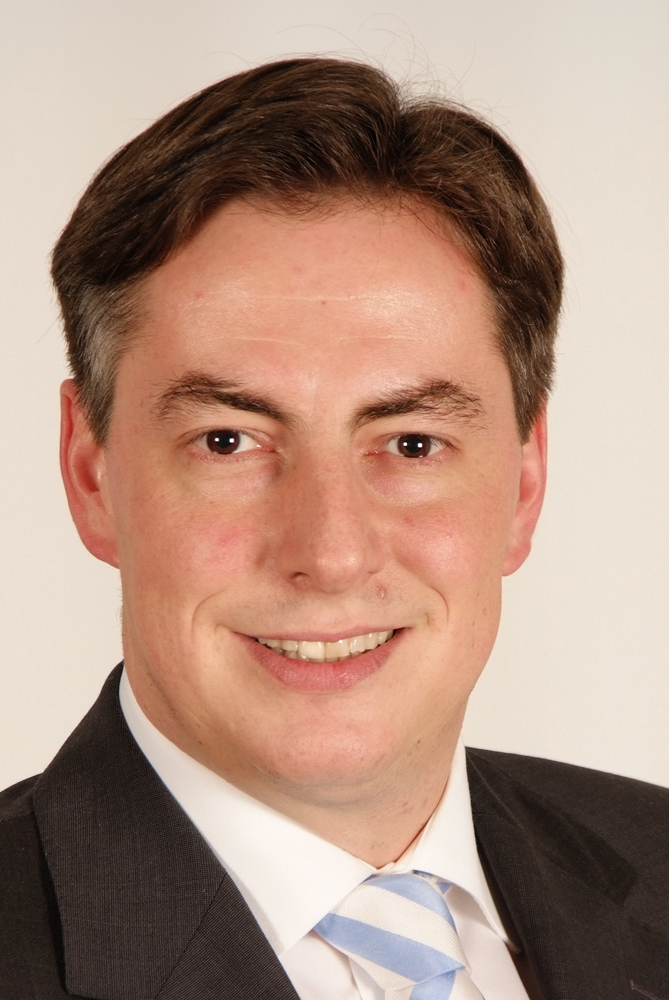

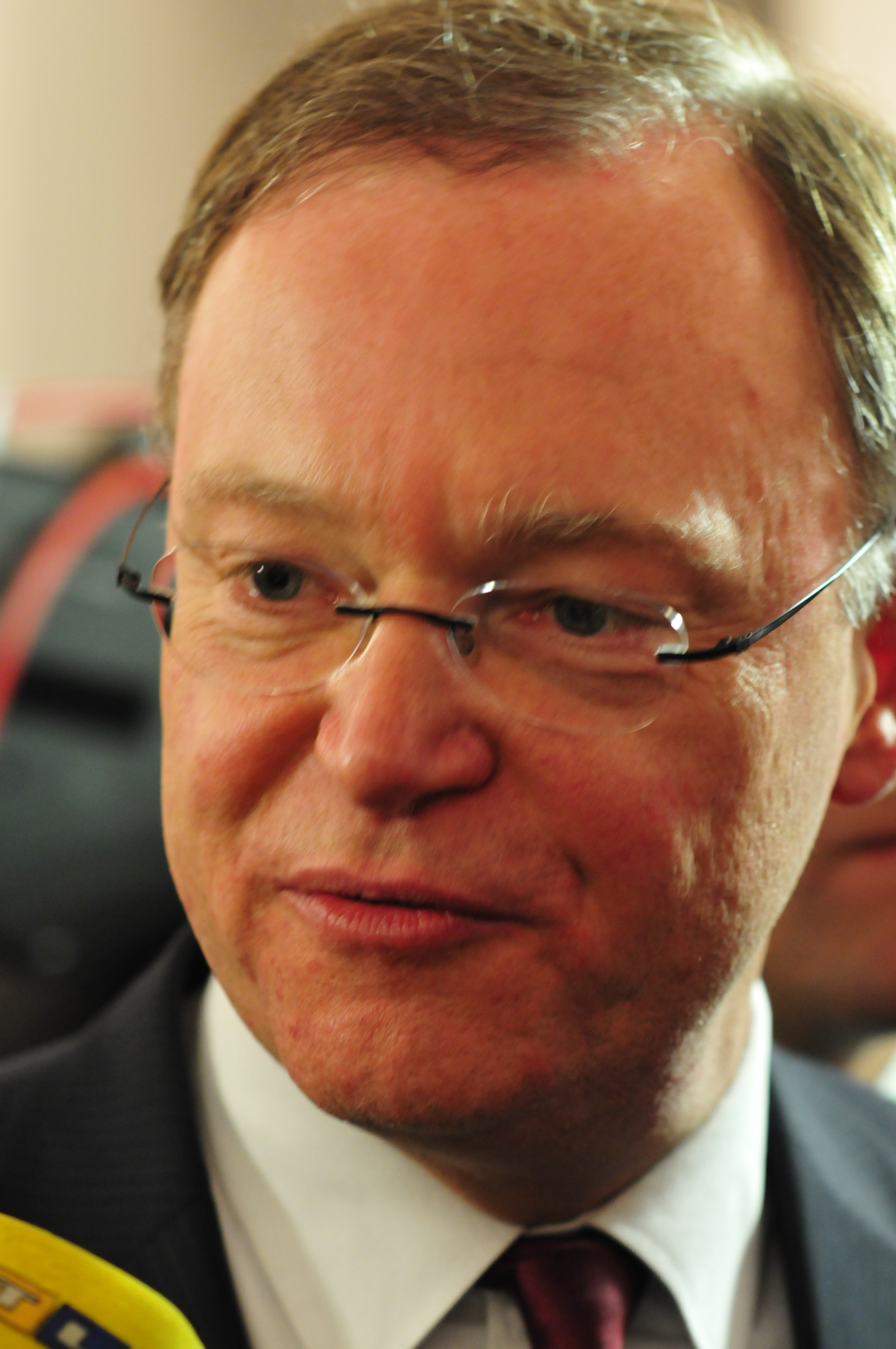

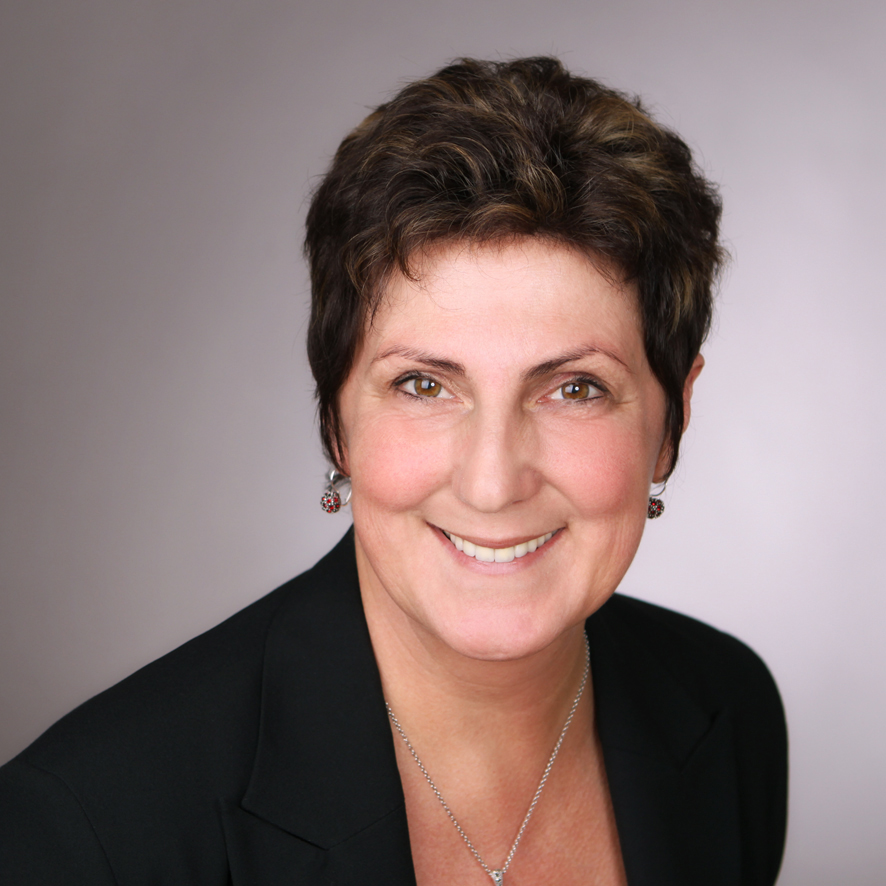

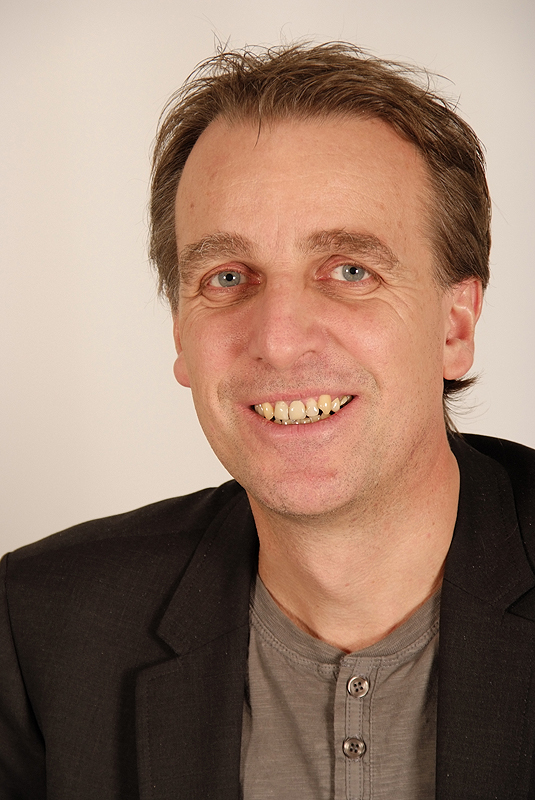

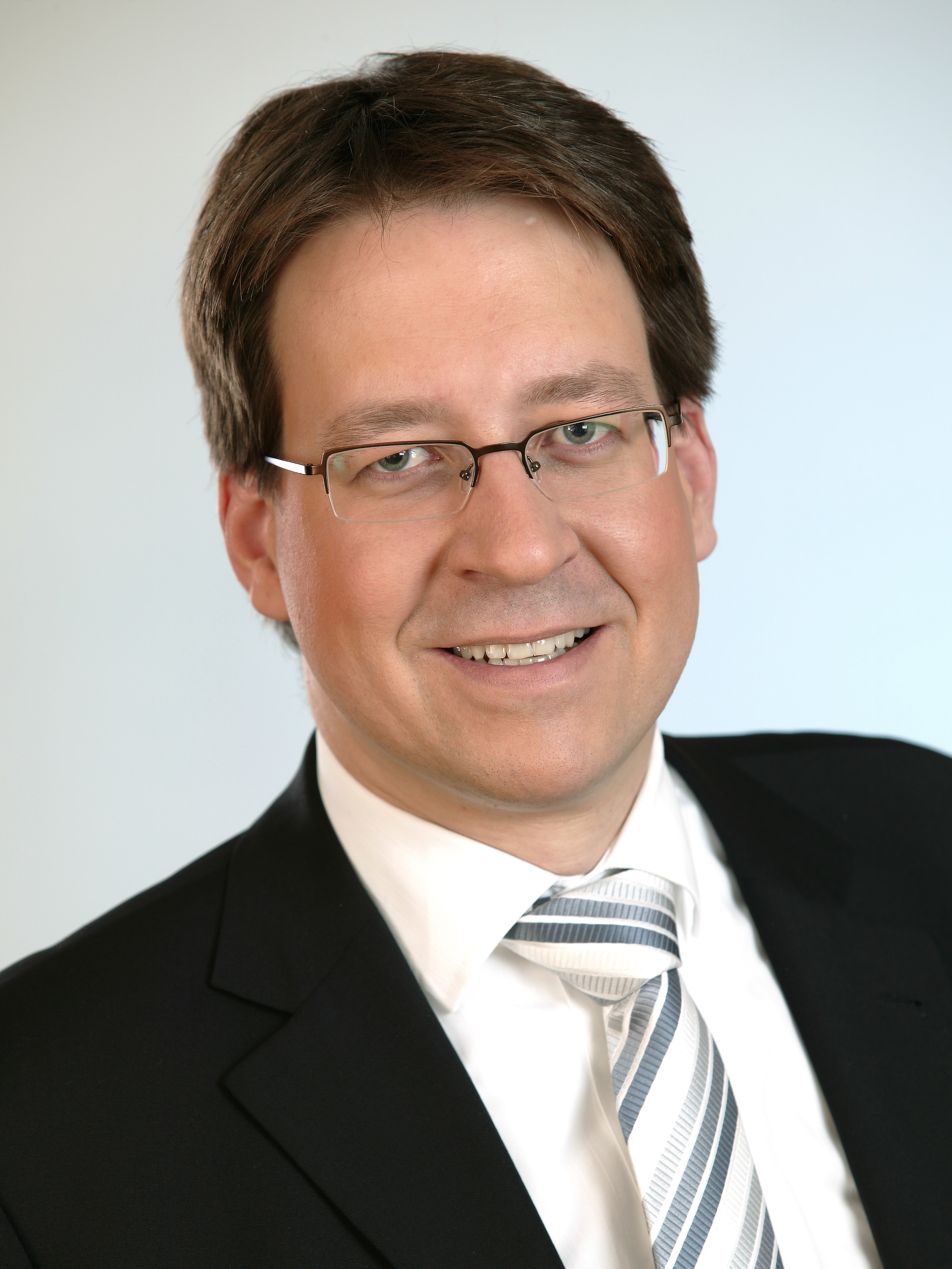

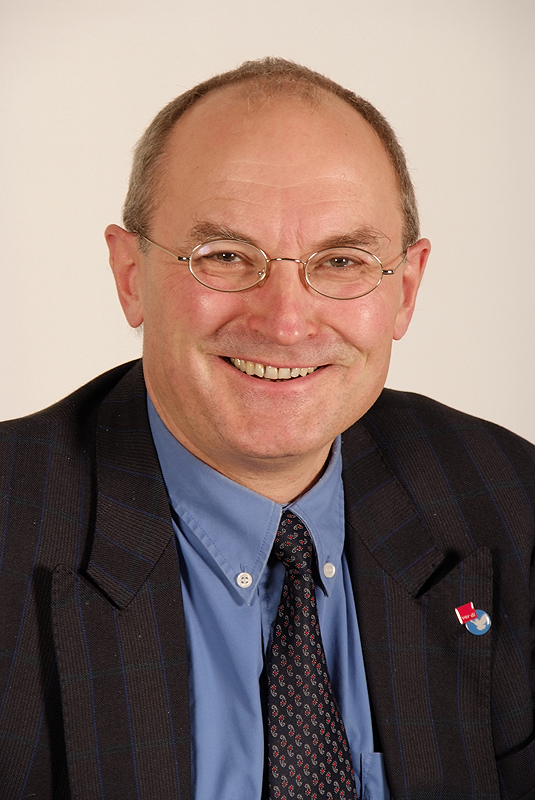
	First party	Second party	Third party
Leader	David McAllister	Stephan Weil	Anja Piel & Stefan Wenzel
Party	CDU	SPD	Greens
Last election	68 seats, 42.5%	48 seats, 30.3%	12 seats, 8.0%
Seats won	54	49	20
Seat change	▼14	▲1	▲8
Popular vote	1,287,549	1,165,538	489,473
Percentage	36.0%	32.6%	13.7%
Swing	▼6.5%	▲2.3%	▲5.7%
	Fourth party	Fifth party
Leader	Stefan Birkner	Manfred Sohn
Party	FDP	Left
Last election	13 seats, 8.2%	11 seats, 7.1%
Seats won	14	0
Seat change	▲1	▼11
Popular vote	354,970	112,212
Percentage	9.9%	3.1%
Swing	▲1.7%	▼4.0%
- Results for the single-member constituencies
Minister-President before election
David McAllister
CDU
Elected Minister-President
Stephan Weil
SPD

The 2013 Lower Saxony state election was held on 20 January 2013 to elect the members of the 17th Landtag of Lower Saxony. The incumbent coalition government of the Christian Democratic Union (CDU) and Free Democratic Party (FDP) led by Minister-President David McAllister was defeated. The Social Democratic Party (SPD) formed a government with The Greens which held a slim, one-seat majority. Stephan Weil was subsequently elected Minister-President.

== Background ==
The CDU–FDP coalition had governed since the 2003. In the 2008 state election, the SPD under Wolfgang Jüttner lost more than three percentage points, suffering its worst ever result in Lower Saxony. The FDP retained their status as the third strongest party, leading the Greens by just 0.2%. The Left won 7.1 percent of the vote, crossing the electoral threshold and winning seats for the first time.

Most polls taken in early 2012 showed a SPD–Green majority. However, in the lead-up to the election, polls tightened, with the CDU–FDP coalition virtually neck and neck with the SPD–Green coalition. Polling suggested that the FDP's vote could be very close to 5%, which led some officials in the CDU to suggest tactically voting FDP to ensure it met the threshold.

Before the election, the SPD and Greens announced their plan to govern and campaign together. The CDU acted independently of the FDP during the campaign, but sought to continue the incumbent coalition. If a CDU–FDP coalition could not be formed, the CDU stated that the SPD would be their second choice. However, the SPD itself rejected the idea of a grand coalition.

== Electoral system ==
The system used was Mixed-member proportional representation. The results in the electoral districts were determined using FPTP and the overall result using the D'Hondt method.

== Parties ==
The table below lists parties represented in the 16th Landtag of Lower Saxony.

Name		Ideology	Leader(s)	2008 result	
Name		Ideology	Leader(s)	Votes (%)	Seats
CDU	Christian Democratic Union of Germany; Christlich Demokratische Union Deutschlands	Christian democracy	David McAllister	42.5%	68 / 152
SPD	Social Democratic Party of Germany; Sozialdemokratische Partei Deutschlands	Social democracy	Stephan Weil	30.3%	48 / 152
FDP	Free Democratic Party; Freie Demokratische Partei	Classical liberalism	Stefan Birkner	8.2%	13 / 152
Grüne	Alliance 90/The Greens; Bündnis 90/Die Grünen	Green politics	Anja Piel; Stefan Wenzel	8.0%	12 / 152
Linke	The Left; Die Linke	Democratic socialism	Manfred Sohn	7.1%	11 / 152

== Opinion polling ==
Polling firm	Fieldwork date	Sample size	CDU	SPD	FDP	Grüne	Linke	Piraten	Others	Lead
2013 state election	20 Jan 2013	–	36.0	32.6	9.9	13.7	3.1	2.1	2.5	3.4
GMS	14–16 Jan 2013	1,006	41	33	5	13	3	3	2	8
INFO GmbH	2–6 Jan 2013	1,002	38.0	31.5	4.5	14.5	6.0	3.0	2.5	6.5
Infratest dimap	8–10 Jan 2013	1,001	40	33	5	13	3	3	3	7
GMS	7–9 Jan 2013	1,007	41	33	5	13	3	3	2	8
Forschungsgruppe Wahlen	7–9 Jan 2013	1,040	39	33	5	13	3	3	4	6
Infratest dimap	28 Dec 2012–2 Jan 2013	1,000	40	34	4	13	3	3	3	6
INFO GmbH	7–14 Dec 2012	1,001	38.5	33.0	3.5	12.5	4.0	4.5	4.0	5.5
Forschungsgruppe Wahlen	3–5 Dec 2012	1,043	39	32	4	13	4	4	4	7
Infratest dimap	30 Nov–4 Dec 2012	1,000	40	33	3	15	3	3	3	7
GMS	28–30 Nov 2012	1,006	41	32	4	13	3	4	3	9
Infratest dimap	2–6 Nov 2012	1,003	41	34	3	13	3	3	3	7
Infratest dimap	17–19 Sep 2012	1,003	37	33	3	15	4	4	4	4
GMS	10–14 Sep 2012	1,002	38	33	5	13	5	3	3	5
Forsa	11–20 Jul 2012	1,108	38	33	4	11	4	7	3	5
YouGov	5–13 Jul 2012	1,025	31	35	4	14	5	7	4	4
Infratest dimap	14–15 May 2012	1,005	32	36	4	13	3	8	4	4
GMS	16–19 Apr 2012	1,005	37	33	3	13	3	9	2	4
Infratest dimap	20–24 Jan 2012	1,001	36	32	3	17	5	4	3	4
GMS	10–14 Jan 2012	1,003	37	33	3	18	3	3	3	4
Infratest dimap	2–4 May 2011	1,000	34	31	5	22	5	1	2	3
Infratest dimap	7–11 Jan 2010	1,000	41	29	9	11	6	–	4	12
2008 state election	27 Jan 2008	–	42.5	30.3	8.2	8.0	7.1	–	3.9	12.2

== Election result ==
Summary of the 20 January 2013 election results for the Landtag of Lower Saxony
Party	Votes	%	+/-	Constituencies	List seats	Total seats	+/-	Total seats %
Christian Democratic Union (CDU)	1,287,549	36.0	▼6.5	54	0	54	▼14	39.4
Social Democratic Party (SPD)	1,165,419	32.6	▲2.3	33	16	49	▲1	35.8
Alliance 90/The Greens (Grüne)	489,473	13.7	▲5.7	0	20	20	▲8	14.6
Free Democratic Party (FDP)	354,970	9.9	▲1.7	0	14	14	▲1	10.2
The Left (Linke)	112,212	3.1	▼4.0	0	0	0	▼11	0
Pirate Party Germany (Piraten)	75,603	2.1	▲2.1	0	0	0	±0	0
Free Voters – Wahlalternative 2013 (FW)	39,714	1.1	▲0.6	0	0	0	±0	0
Others	49,960	1.4		0	0	0	±0	0
Total	3,574,900	100.0		87	50	137	▼15	
Voter turnout		59.4	▲2.4					
Lower Saxon Returning Officer

Popular Vote
CDU	36.02%
SPD	32.60%
B'90/GRÜNE	13.69%
FDP	9.93%
DIE LINKE	3.14%
PIRATEN	2.11%
Other	2.51%

Landtag seats
CDU	39.42%
SPD	35.77%
B'90/GRÜNE	14.60%
FDP	10.22%
