= Jens Kestner =

German politician (born 1971)

Jens Kestner MdB a.D.
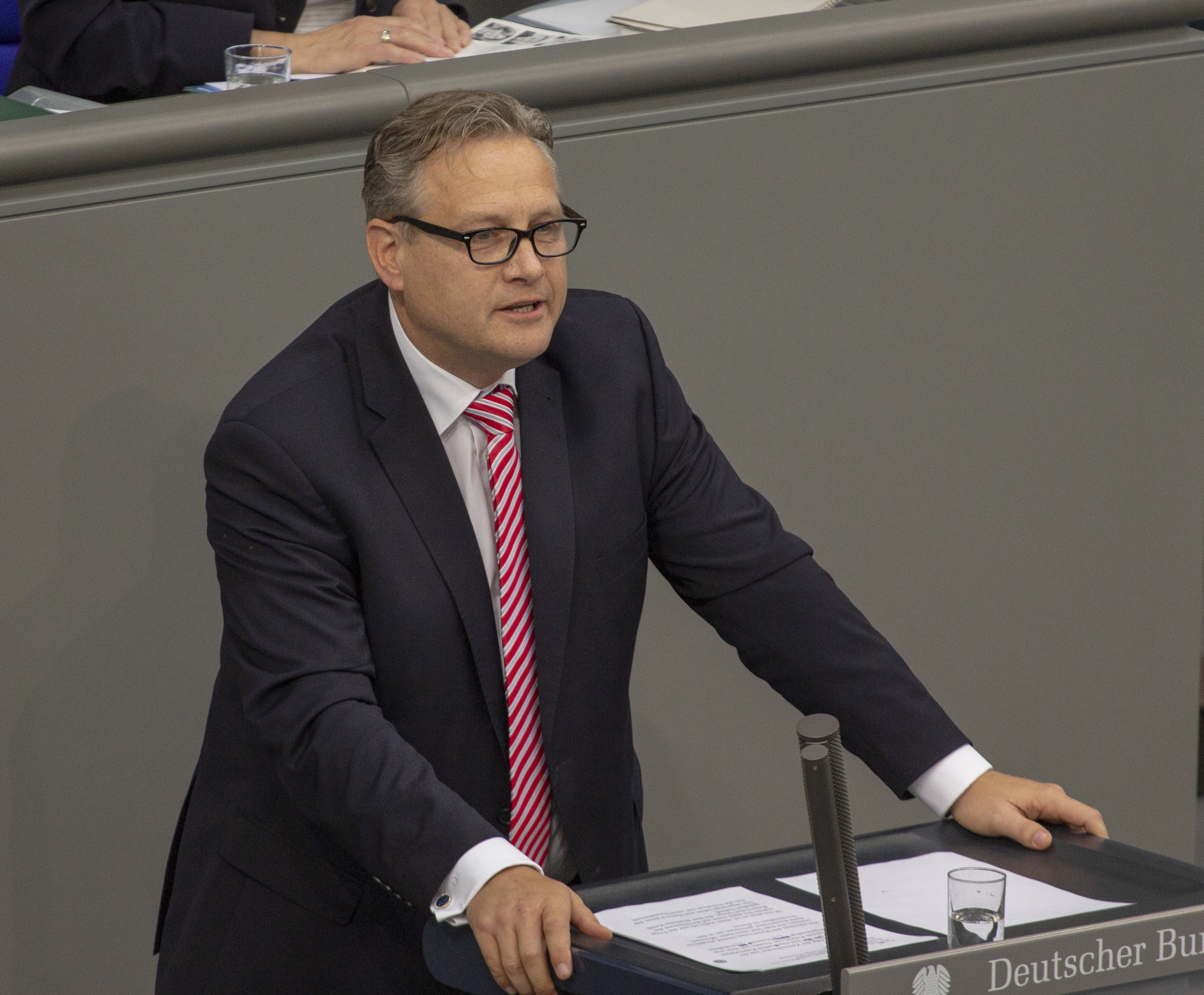
- Kestner in 2019

Leader of the Alternative for Germany in Lower Saxony
- Incumbent
- Assumed office 12 September 2020
- General Secretary: Nicolas Lehrke
- Deputy: Christopher Emden
- Preceded by: Dana Guth

Member of the Bundestag for Lower Saxony
- In office 24 October 2017 – 26 October 2021
- Preceded by: multi-member district
- Succeeded by: Dirk Brandes
- Constituency: Alternative for Germany list

Personal details
- Born: 25 December 1971 (age 54) Northeim, West Germany (now Germany)
- Party: Alternative for Germany (2014–)
- Other party: Christian Democratic Union (2000)
- Occupation: Politician; Businessman; Soldier; Mortician
- Website: Official Bundestag website

Jens Kestner (born 25 December 1971) is a German politician for the Alternative for Germany (AfD) and since 2017 member of the Bundestag.

== Life and politics ==
Kestner was born in 1971 in the West German town of Northeim and became a funeral director. In 2014 Kestner entered the newly founded populist AfD and became after the 2017 German federal election member of the Bundestag. Since 2020 Kestner has been chairman of the federal state party organisation of the AfD in Lower Saxony.
