= Ministry for Education and Culture of Lower Saxony =

Ministry for Education of Lower Saxony
- Niedersächsisches Kultusministerium
- Coat of arms of Lower Saxony

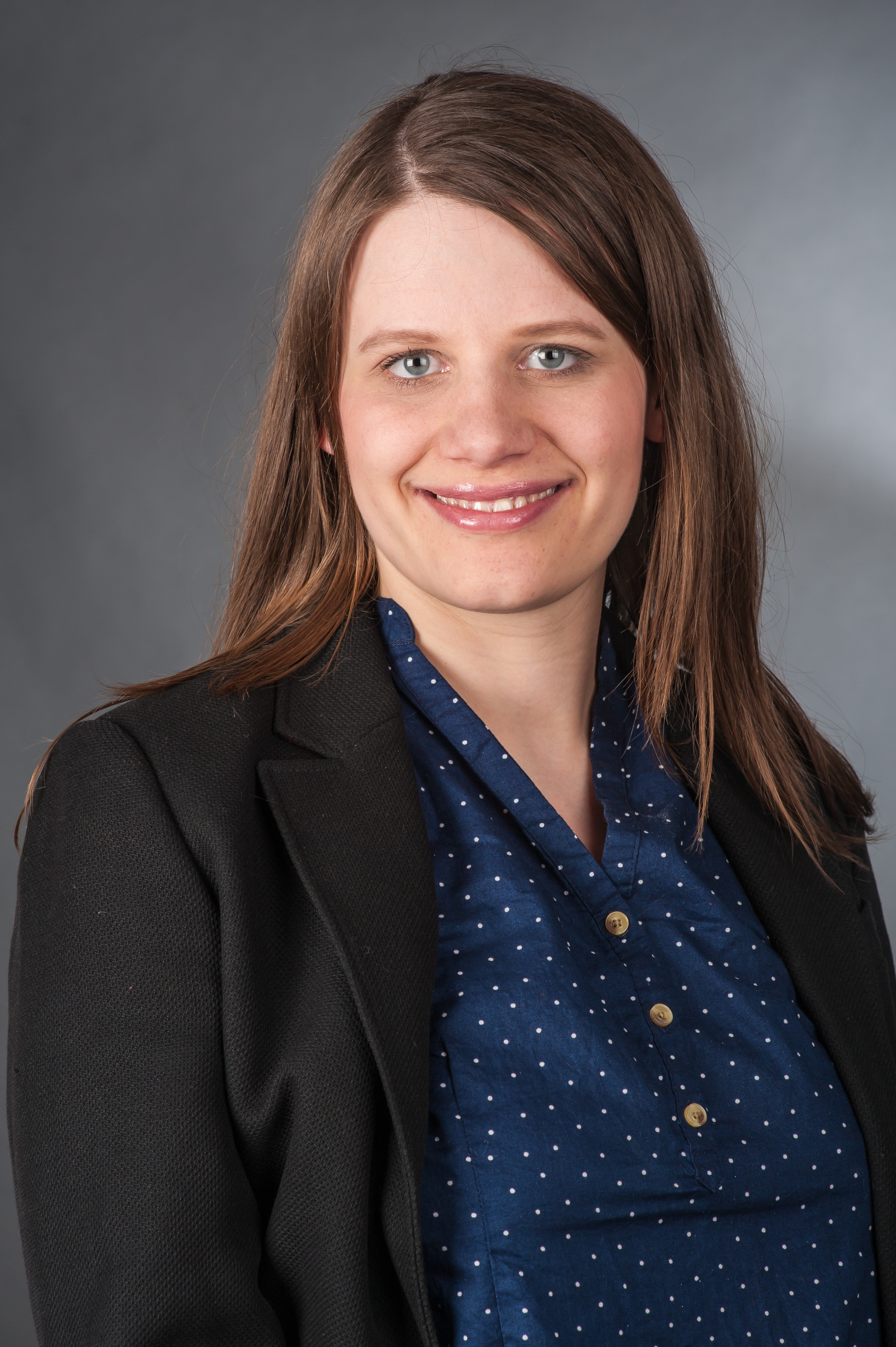
- Incumbent; Julia Hamburg since 8 November 2022
- Residence: Hamburg
- Appointer: Stephan Weil
- Inaugural holder: Adolf Grimme
- Formation: 11 February 1947
- Website: mk.niedersachsen.de

The Ministry for Education and Culture of Lower Saxony is one of 10 ministries in Lower Saxony. The office is located at the Hans-Böckler-Allee 5 in Hanover.

The current Minister is Julia Hamburg (Alliance 90/The Greens) who has been the Minister since 8 November 2022. The current state secretaries are Andrea Hoops and Marco Hartrich who were appointed by Julia Hamburg.
