= Nuclear Waste Disposal Fund =

German federal fund

The Nuclear Waste Disposal Fund (German: Fonds zur Finanzierung der kerntechnischen Entsorgung) is a German federal fund to manage the financial endowment for long-term nuclear waste storage sites. The fund is organised as a trust and falls into the remit of the Federal Ministry for Economic Affairs and Energy. However, the closure of all power stations must be followed by finding a permanent nuclear graveyard by the government's 2031 deadline.

== Background ==
In the aftermath of the nuclear disaster in Fukushima in 2011, the German government decided to phase out nuclear energy production. All German nuclear power plants must therefore be shut down by 2022. Power plant operators were made responsible for the dismantling and disposal of the resulting nuclear waste. To address concerns that the disposal of nuclear waste may be dependent on the financial stability of those operators, the long-term financial responsibility was shifted to a trust fund managed by a federal government agency - the "nuclear fund" (German: "Atomfonds").

== The fund ==
On July 3, 2017, the four German nuclear power plant operators E.ON, EnBW, RWE and Vattenfall have transferred the legally stipulated basic contribution of € 17.9 billion as well as a 35 percent risk premium of € 6.2 billion to the Bundesbank. The resulting sum of € 24.1 billion euros represents the capital stock of the nuclear fund.

In the future, the fund is expected invest its assets in the capital markets and fund the search for suitable intermediate and final waste storage sites with the help of investment income. The selection of the investment instruments of this first German sovereign wealth fund are based on sustainability criteria and must be in line with Environment Social Governance.

Anja Mikus has been appointed CEO of the fund.

== Investments ==
As of July 2018, the fund has invested about 10% of its assets. €2.5 billion had been invested in highly liquid government bonds. The remaining assets were held as cash with the Bundesbank which resulted in a loss of €70 million in the funds first year due to the negative interest environment.

== See also ==
Nuclear Power in Germany
