= 2017 Lower Saxony state election =

State election in Lower Saxony, Germany

- 15 October 2017

All 137 seats in the Landtag of Lower Saxony 69 seats needed for a majority
- Turnout: 3,828,003 (63.1%) ▲3.7%
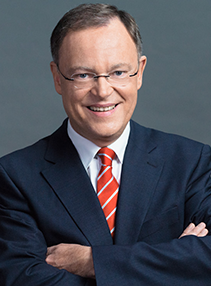

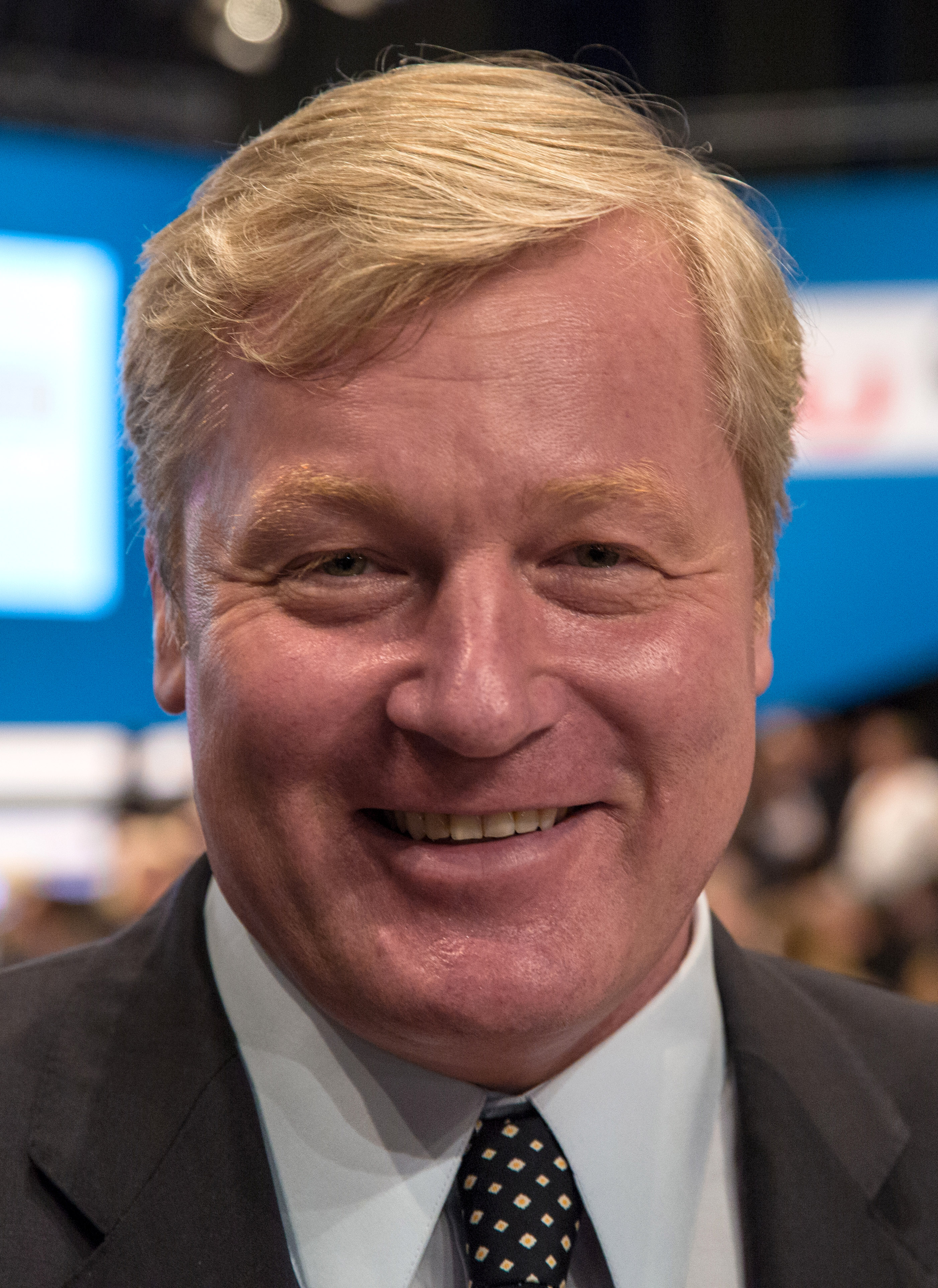

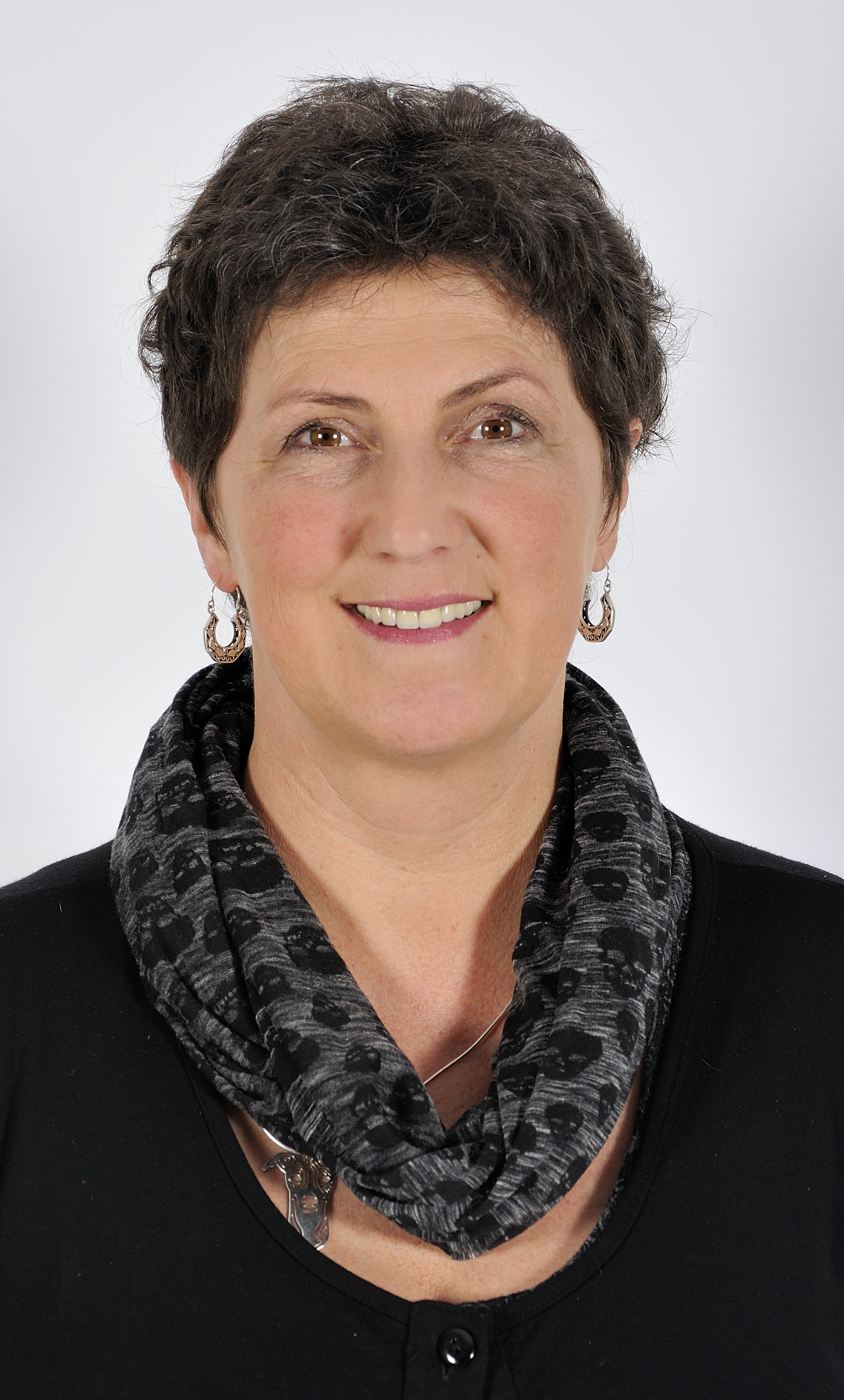

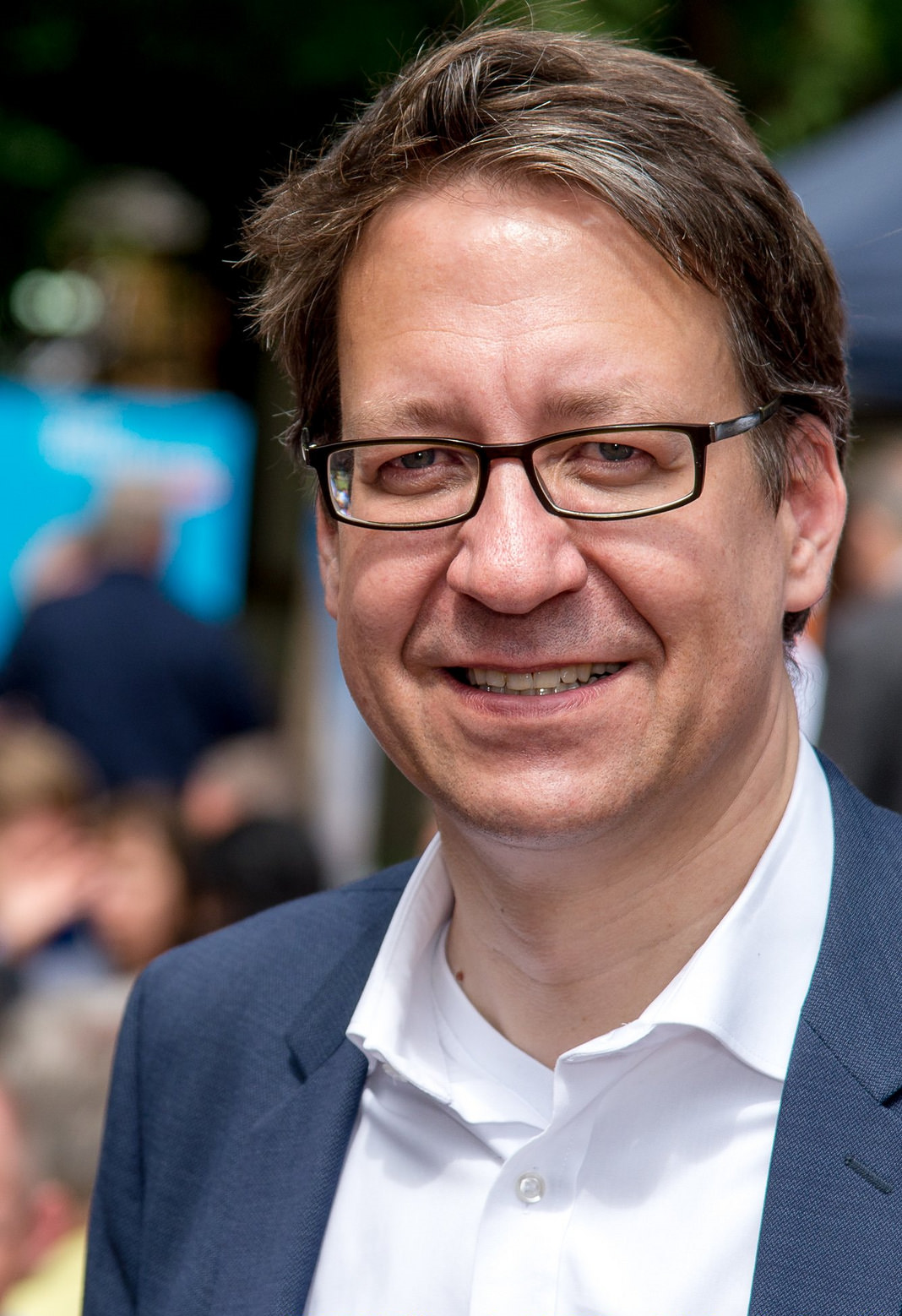

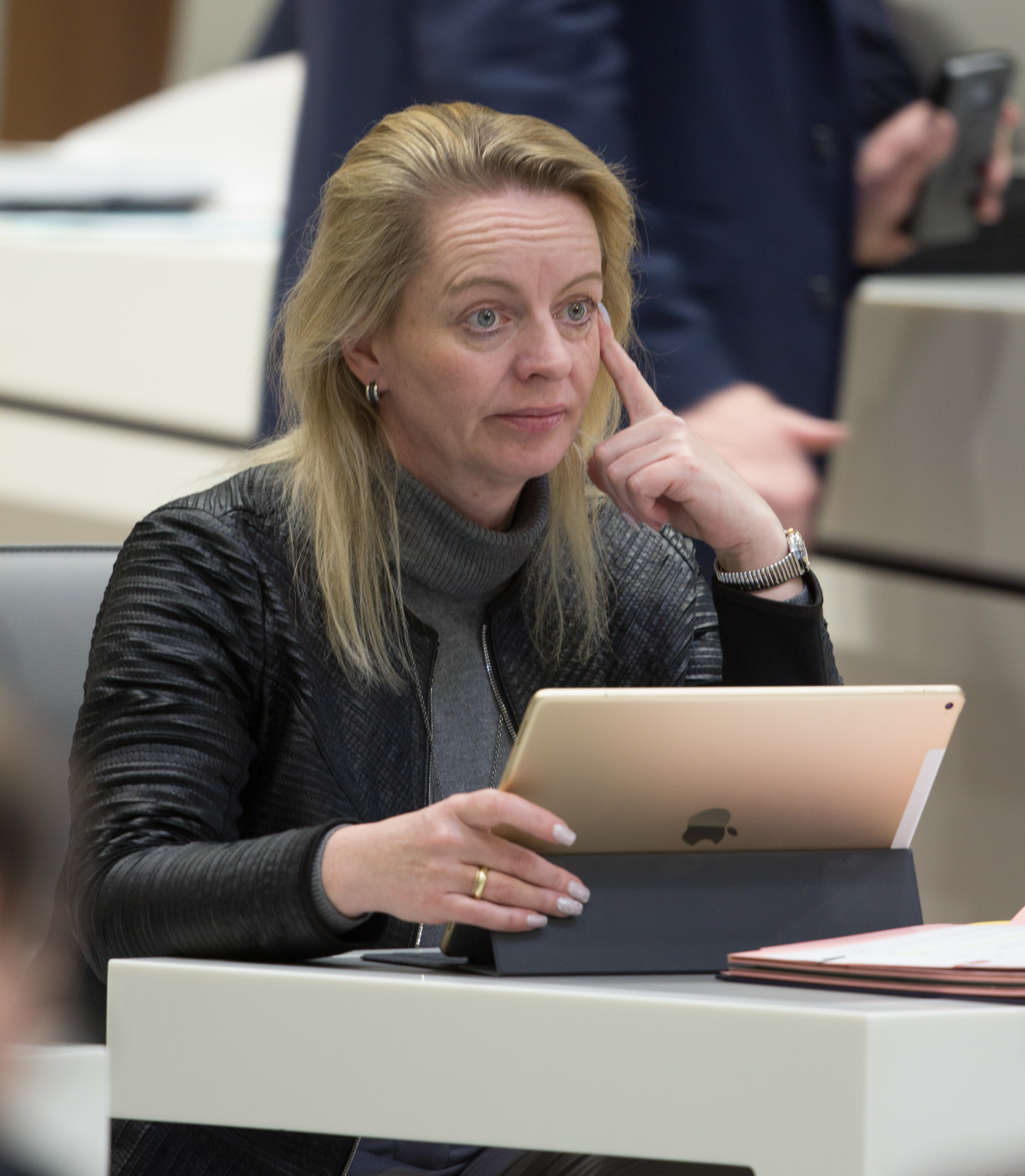
| | First party | Second party | Third party |
|---|---|---|---|
| Leader | Stephan Weil | Bernd Althusmann | Anja Piel |
| Party | SPD | CDU | Greens |
| Last election | 49 seats, 32.6% | 54 seats, 36.0% | 20 seats, 13.7% |
| Seats won | 55 | 50 | 12 |
| Seat change | ▲6 | ▼4 | ▼8 |
| Popular vote | 1,413,990 | 1,287,191 | 334,130 |
| Percentage | 36.9% | 33.6% | 8.7% |
| Swing | ▲4.3% | ▼2.4% | ▼5.0% |
| | Fourth party | Fifth party |
| Leader | Stefan Birkner | Dana Guth |
| Party | FDP | AfD |
| Last election | 14 seats, 9.9% | Did not exist |
| Seats won | 11 | 9 |
| Seat change | ▼3 | ▲9 |
| Popular vote | 287,957 | 235,863 |
| Percentage | 7.5% | 6.2% |
| Swing | ▼2.4% | Did not exist |
- Results for the single-member constituencies
Government before election
First Weil cabinet
SPD–Green
Government after election
Second Weil cabinet
SPD–CDU

The 2017 Lower Saxony state election was held on 15 October 2017 to elect the 18th Landtag of Lower Saxony. The incumbent coalition government of the Social Democratic Party (SPD) and The Greens led by Minister-President Stephan Weil was defeated. Though the SPD became the largest party in the Landtag largely fueled by the personal popularity of Weil, their gains were offset by losses for the Greens, depriving the government of its majority. The SPD subsequently formed a grand coalition with the Christian Democratic Union (CDU), and Weil continued as Minister-President.

This was the last election, state or federal, in which the SPD gained seats or increased their share of the popular vote until the 2021 German federal election and 2021 Mecklenburg-Vorpommern state election which both took place on the same day in September 2021.

== Background ==
Following the 2013 state election, a red-green coalition between the SPD and Greens was formed, holding a one-seat majority in the Landtag. After Green parliamentarian Elke Twesten controversially defected to the CDU on 4 August 2017, the coalition lost its majority, which prompted Minister-President Stephan Weil to schedule an early election for 15 October. The Landtag was officially dissolved on 21 August after 135 of 137 parliamentarians voted in favor, with 91 votes required for its dissolution.

== Electoral system ==
The Landtag of Lower Saxony is elected using mixed-member proportional representation. Its minimum size is 135 seats. Of these, 87 are elected in single-member constituencies, and the remainder are determined by party lists. Voters have two votes: the "first vote" for candidates within each individual constituency, and the "second vote" for party lists. There is an electoral threshold of 5% of second vote to qualify for seats. Seats are allocated using the d'Hondt method, with additional overhang and leveling seats provided to ensure proportionality. The normal term of the Landtag is 5 years.

== Parties ==
The table below lists parties represented in the 17th Landtag of Lower Saxony.

| Name | | Ideology | Leader(s) | 2013 result | |
| Name | | Ideology | Leader(s) | Votes (%) | Seats |
|---|---|---|---|---|---|
| CDU | Christian Democratic Union of Germany; Christlich Demokratische Union Deutschlands | Christian democracy | Bernd Althusmann | 36.0% | 54 / 137 |
| SPD | Social Democratic Party of Germany; Sozialdemokratische Partei Deutschlands | Social democracy | Stephan Weil | 32.6% | 49 / 137 |
| Grüne | Alliance 90/The Greens; Bündnis 90/Die Grünen | Green politics | Anja Piel | 13.7% | 20 / 137 |
| FDP | Free Democratic Party; Freie Demokratische Partei | Classical liberalism | Stefan Birkner | 9.9% | 14 / 137 |

== Opinion polling ==
| Polling firm | Fieldwork date | Sample size | CDU | SPD | Grüne | FDP | Linke | AfD | Others | Lead |
|---|---|---|---|---|---|---|---|---|---|---|
| 2017 state election | 15 Oct 2017 | – | 33.6 | 36.9 | 8.7 | 7.5 | 4.6 | 6.2 | 2.4 | 3.3 |
| Civey | 25 Sep–13 Oct 2017 | 5,073 | 31.8 | 34.6 | 8.5 | 8.9 | 5.7 | 7.8 | 2.7 | 2.8 |
| Forschungsgruppe Wahlen | 10–11 Oct 2017 | 1,001 | 33 | 34.5 | 9 | 9 | 5 | 7 | 2.5 | 1.5 |
| INSA | 4–6 Oct 2017 | 1,005 | 32 | 33 | 10 | 10 | 5 | 7 | 3 | 1 |
| Forschungsgruppe Wahlen | 2–5 Oct 2017 | 1,083 | 33 | 33 | 9 | 10 | 5 | 7 | 3 | Tie |
| Infratest dimap | 2–4 Oct 2017 | 1,002 | 34 | 34 | 8.5 | 8 | 4.5 | 8 | 3 | Tie |
| Civey | 24 Sep–1 Oct 2017 | 4,570 | 33.1 | 32.8 | 9.9 | 8.0 | 5.4 | 8.1 | 2.7 | 0.3 |
| Infratest dimap | 26–27 Sep 2017 | 1,004 | 35 | 34 | 9 | 8 | 5 | 6 | 3 | 1 |
| 2017 federal election | 24 Sep 2017 | – | 34.9 | 27.4 | 8.7 | 9.3 | 6.9 | 9.1 | 3.6 | 7.5 |
| Infratest dimap | 30 Aug–5 Sep 2017 | 1,001 | 37 | 32 | 10 | 6 | 5 | 7 | 3 | 5 |
| dimap | 18–26 Aug 2017 | 1,003 | 39 | 31 | 8 | 8 | 4 | 8 | 2 | 8 |
| INSA | 9 Aug 2017 | 1,000 | 40 | 28 | 9 | 9 | 5 | 7 | 2 | 12 |
| Infratest dimap | 8–9 Aug 2017 | 1,003 | 40 | 32 | 9 | 7 | 3 | 6 | 3 | 8 |
| INSA | 18–23 May 2017 | 1,000 | 41 | 27 | 8 | 9 | 5 | 6 | 4 | 14 |
| Forsa | 18–28 Apr 2017 | 1,001 | 35 | 36 | 8 | 6 | 4 | 6 | 5 | 1 |
| Infratest dimap | 13–18 Jan 2017 | 1,002 | 35 | 31 | 14 | 6 | 4 | 8 | 2 | 4 |
| Forsa | 22 Dec 2016–9 Jan 2017 | 1,000 | 34 | 32 | 12 | 6 | 4 | 7 | 5 | 2 |
| INSA | 6–14 Oct 2016 | 1,000 | 33 | 31 | 12 | 8 | 5 | 7 | 4 | 2 |
| Forsa | 23 Oct–20 Nov 2015 | 1,002 | 35 | 33 | 14 | 6 | 4 | 4 | 4 | 2 |
| INSA | 21 Aug–2 Sep 2015 | 1,000 | 37 | 29 | 14 | 6 | 6 | 3 | 5 | 8 |
| Infratest dimap | 26 Jun–1 Jul 2015 | 1,000 | 40 | 31 | 14 | 5 | 5 | 2 | 3 | 9 |
| GMS | 8–13 Jan 2015 | 1,012 | 41 | 30 | 14 | 3 | 4 | 4 | 4 | 11 |
| 2014 European election | 25 May 2014 | – | 39.4 | 32.5 | 10.9 | 2.5 | 4.0 | 5.4 | 5.3 | 6.9 |
| Infratest dimap | 14–16 Jan 2014 | 1,000 | 40 | 32 | 13 | 4 | 5 | 3 | 3 | 8 |
| 2013 federal election | 22 Sep 2013 | – | 41.1 | 33.1 | 8.8 | 4.2 | 5.0 | 3.7 | 4.1 | 8.0 |
| 2013 state election | 20 Jan 2013 | – | 36.0 | 32.6 | 13.7 | 9.9 | 3.1 | – | 4.6 | 3.4 |

== Results ==
| Party | Constituency | | | Party list | | | Total seats | +/– |
| Party | Votes | % | Seats | Votes | % | Seats | Total seats | +/– |
|---|---|---|---|---|---|---|---|---|
| Social Democratic Party (SPD) | 1,508,830 | 39.6% | 55 | 1,413,990 | 36.9% | 0 | 55 | +6 |
| Christian Democratic Union (CDU) | 1,420,083 | 37.3% | 32 | 1,287,191 | 33.6% | 18 | 50 | –4 |
| Alliance 90/The Greens (Grüne) | 283,327 | 7.4% | 0 | 334,130 | 8.7% | 12 | 12 | –8 |
| Free Democratic Party (FDP) | 226,554 | 5.9% | 0 | 287,957 | 7.5% | 11 | 11 | –3 |
| Alternative for Germany (AfD) | 174,521 | 4.6% | 0 | 235,863 | 6.2% | 9 | 9 | +9 |
| The Left (Linke) | 170,660 | 4.5% | 0 | 177,118 | 4.6% | 0 | 0 | – |
| Animal Protection Party (Tierschutz) | – | – | 0 | 27,108 | 0.7% | 0 | 0 | – |
| Die PARTEI (PARTEI) | 9,097 | 0.2% | 0 | 22,578 | 0.6% | 0 | 0 | – |
| Free Voters (FW) | 11,348 | 0.3% | 0 | 14,869 | 0.4% | 0 | 0 | – |
| Pirate Party (Piraten) | 2,350 | 0.1% | 0 | 8,449 | 0.2% | 0 | 0 | – |
| Basic Income Alliance (BFE) | – | – | 0 | 5,125 | 0.1% | 0 | 0 | – |
| German Centre (DM) | – | – | 0 | 4,482 | 0.1% | 0 | 0 | – |
| V-Partei^{3} | – | – | 0 | 4,151 | 0.1% | 0 | 0 | – |
| Ecological Democratic Party (ÖDP) | 735 | 0.0% | 0 | 4,042 | 0.1% | 0 | 0 | – |
| Liberal Conservative Reformers (LKR) | 488 | 0.0% | 0 | 950 | 0.0% | 0 | 0 | – |
| The Grays (DG) | 260 | 0.0% | 0 | – | – | 0 | 0 | – |
| Independents | 2,447 | 0.1% | 0 | – | – | 0 | 0 | – |
| Total | 3,811,125 | 100.0% | 87 | 3,828,003 | 100.0% | 50 | 137 | – |
| Valid votes | 3,811,125 | 99.0% | | 3,828,003 | 99.5% | | | |
| Invalid votes | 37,892 | 1.0% | | 21,014 | 0.5% | | | |
| Turnout | 3,849,017 | 63.1% | | | | | | |
| Eligible voters | 6,098,379 | | | | | | | |
Source: Niedersächsische Landeswahlleiterin

== Government formation ==
Due to AfD entering the Landtag and no party willing to form a coalition with them, neither the incumbent red-green coalition between the SPD and Greens nor the black-yellow opposition of the CDU and FDP secured a majority of seats in the election. Because the FDP ruled out the possibility of a traffic light coalition (between the SPD, FDP, and Greens) and the Greens ruled out a Jamaica coalition (between the CDU, Greens, and FDP), the SPD and CDU subsequently agreed to start negotiations to form a grand coalition.

On 16 November, the SPD and CDU agreed to form a government.

== See also ==
- 2013 Lower Saxony state election
- 2017 German federal election
