= Stefan Birkner =

German politician (born 1973)

Stefan Birkner MdL
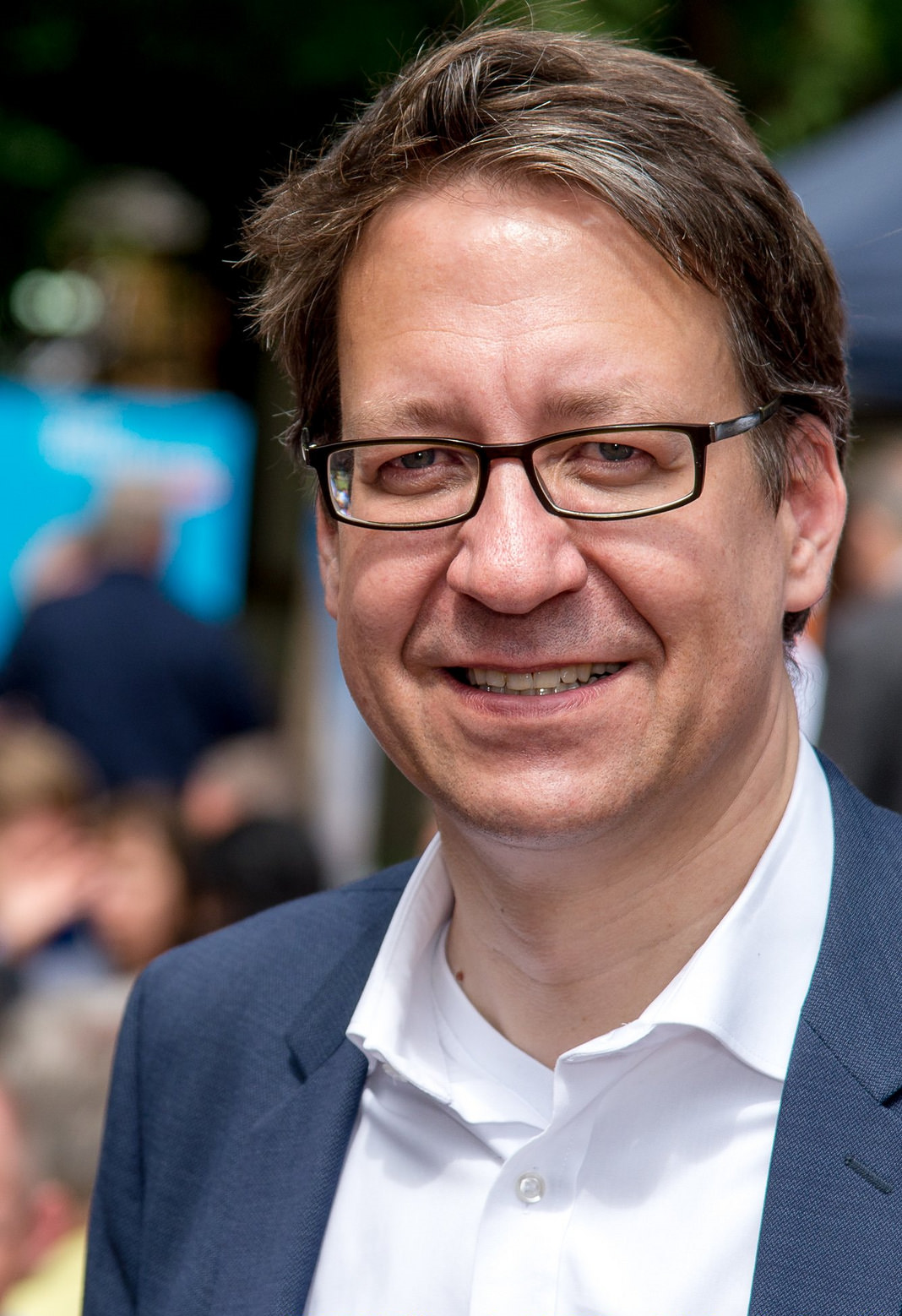
- Birkner in 2017

Leader of the Free Democratic Party in Lower Saxony
- In office 25 September 2011 – 11 March 2023
- General Secretary: Konstantin Kuhle
- Deputy: Jörg Bode; Sylvia Bruns; Christiane Ratjen-Damerau
- Preceded by: Philipp Rösler
- Succeeded by: Konstantin Kuhle

Leader of the Free Democratic Party in the Landtag of Lower Saxony
- Incumbent
- Assumed office 26 September 2017
- Deputy: Björn Försterling
- Preceded by: Christian Dürr

Minister of the Environment, Energy and Climate Protection of Lower Saxony
- In office 18 January 2012 – 19 February 2013
- Minister-President: David McAllister
- Preceded by: Hans-Heinrich Sander
- Succeeded by: Stefan Wenzel

State Secretary in the Ministry of the Environment of Lower Saxony
- In office 26 February 2008 – 17 January 2012
- Minister-President: Christian Wulff; David McAllister
- Minister: Hans-Heinrich Sander
- Succeeded by: Ulla Ihnen

Member of the Landtag of Lower Saxony
- Incumbent
- Assumed office 26 February 2008
- Constituency: FDP List

Personal details
- Born: 12 April 1973 (age 53) Münsterlingen, Thurgau, Switzerland
- Citizenship: German
- Party: Free Democratic Party (1991–present)
- Children: 2
- Education: Leibniz University Hannover
- Occupation: Politician

Stefan Birkner (born 12 April 1973) is a German lawyer and politician for the Free Democratic Party (FDP). From 2011 to 2023, he chaired the FDP in Lower Saxony.

== Political career ==
Birkner was elected to the State Parliament of Lower Saxony in the 2008 state elections. However, in February 2008 he left the Landtag to become a State Secretary for the State Minister of the Environment in the second cabinet Wulff, Hans-Heinrich Sander. He was replaced by Christian Grascha. From January 2012 until 2013, he served as State Minister for Environment, Energy and Climate Protection in the government of Minister-President David McAllister.

In September 2017, Birkner succeeded Christian Dürr as chairman of the FDP's parliamentary group.

In the negotiations to form a so-called traffic light coalition of the Social Democrats (SPD), the Green Party and the FDP following the 2021 federal elections, Birkner led his party's delegation in the working group on environment policy; his co-chairs from the other parties were Rita Schwarzelühr-Sutter (SPD) and Steffi Lemke (Bündnis 90/Die Grünen).

Birkner was nominated by his party as a delegate to the Federal Convention to elect the President of Germany in 2022.

== Life after politics ==
In February 2023, Birkner joined consulting firm Ernst & Young. In April 2023, he was nominated by Federal Minister for Digital and Transport Volker Wissing to lead the executive board of the Autobahn GmbH, a state-owned entity; amid public criticism around the appointment, he withdrew his name from consideration.

== Other activities ==
- Federal Network Agency for Electricity, Gas, Telecommunications, Post and Railway (BNetzA), Alternate Member of the Advisory Board (2012–2013)

== Personal life ==
Birkner was born in Münsterlingen.

He is married. His brother-in-law is fellow politician Robert Habeck.

== General references ==
- "Staatssekretär Dr. Stefan Birkner" (in German). Niedersächsisches Ministerium für Umwelt und Klimaschutz.
