= Birgitte Grimstad =

Danish-born Norwegian musician (born 1935)

- Born: 15 December 1935 (age 90); Copenhagen, Denmark
- Occupations: Singer, guitarist, composer and writer
- Father: Aksel Schiøtz
- Awards: Norwegian Music Critics Award; Spellemannprisen (1972, with Geirr Tveitt, and 1980, with the song quartet Ballade!)

Birgitte Grimstad (born 15 December 1935) is a Danish-born Norwegian singer, guitarist, composer and writer.

== Personal life ==
Grimstad was born in Copenhagen, Denmark, the daughter of Aksel Schiøtz and Gerd Haugsted. She was married to ambassador Per Øystein Grimstad from 1958 to 1988.

== Career ==
Grimstad studied theatre and mass media at the University of Minnesota, United States. She moved to Norway in 1959, and produced television shows for the Norwegian Broadcasting Corporation (NRK), including children's programs and shows with performers such as Alf Prøysen and Lalla Carlsen.

She made her musical debut in 1966 with the single "Det første som jeg ønsker meg", with lyrics by Alf Prøysen, and "Å være barn en sommerdag" (lyrics by André Bjerke). That same year, she issued the album Birgitte Grimstad synger viser. Her first Danish album was Viser er så meget, released in 1968. Her folk album Nordlysun (1972), in cooperation with Geirr Tveitt, earned her a Spellemannprisen. Other albums from the 1970s are Viser i vinden (1972), Ej Blot til Børn (1973), Ord over grind (1977), and Songs of Scandinavia (1978). She published the songbooks Fra Birgitte Grimstads repertoar in 1969 and Menneskeviser in 1972.

She took the initiative in establishing the song quartet Ballade!, which consisted of herself, Åse Kleveland, Lars Klevstrand, and Lillebjørn Nilsen. The group toured Denmark and Norway. Their concert album Ballade på turné, released in 1978, became very popular. The quartet's second album, Ekstranummer from 1980, was awarded a Spellemannprisen. Later in the 1980s she performed Bach's Geistliche Lieder and the medieval ballad Draumkvedet in churches in Denmark and Norway. Her album Pas på de vilde fugle from 1983 included a Danish version of Prøysen's "Vise for gærne jinter", Nordahl Grieg's poem "Til Ungdommen" to Otto Mortensen melody, and a translation of the Elvis Presley hit "Love Me Tender". Later albums are Wondering And Calling from 1986, and Love Is A Flow from 1996.

She was awarded a Musikkritikerprisen in 1972, and a Prøysenprisen in 1999.
