= Herborg Kråkevik =

Norwegian singer and actress (born 1973)

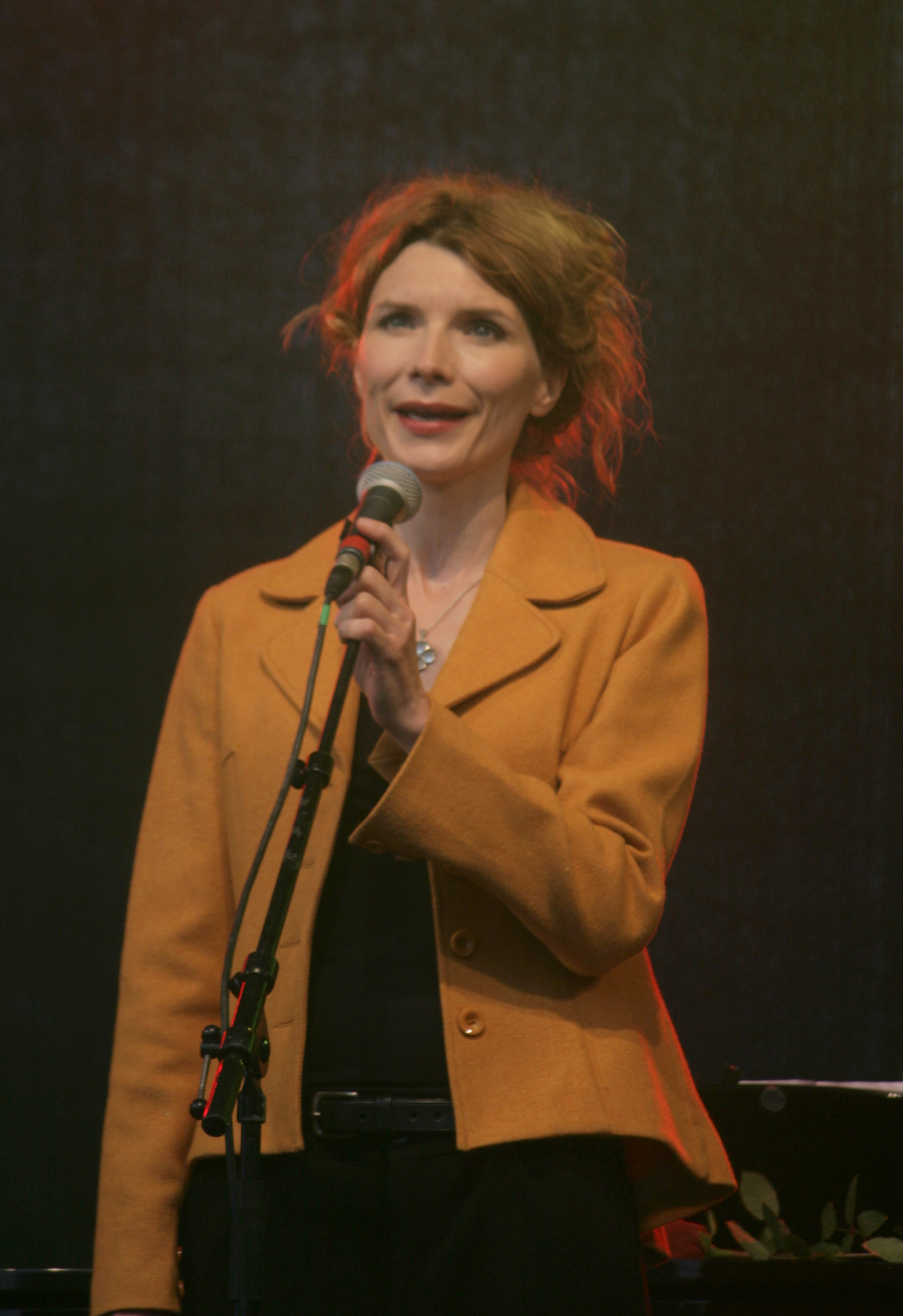
Kråkevik singing Til Ungdommen at the Rose march memorial after the 2011 Norway attacks

Herborg Kråkevik (born 28 December 1973) is a Norwegian singer and actress, known for her works with Norwegian folksongs and some stage works and many movies. Her more famous roles being her debut as Eliza in My Fair Lady (1997) and Julie in Romeo og Julie (1997).

Kråkevik gained much success when she in 2000 released Kråkeviks Songbok, a CD that included her interpretations of several Norwegian folk songs, including Den Fyrste Sang and a musical version of the poem Til Ungdommen by Norwegian poet and author Nordahl Grieg.

Kråkevik then had a leading role in Det største i verden (2001) as Petra. In 2005, she was chosen one of Norway's ambassadors to the Hans Christian Andersen Association. Kråkevik is married and has two children.

== Bibliography ==
- 2004: Forteljingar

== Discography ==
- 1995: Mi Haugtussa
- 1998: Herborgs Verden (nominert til Spellemannprisen)
- 2000: Kråkeviks songbok
- 2002: Eg og Edith
- 2004: Forteljingar (lydbok)
- 2008: Annleis enn i går
- 2009: Kvar ein dag
- 2011: Alltid i mitt sinn
- 2012: Jul i stova

== Filmography ==
- 1993: Det rare
- 1996: Jakten på nyresteinen
- 2001: Det største i verden

== Theatre ==
- 1995: Haugtussa - based on poems by Arne Garborg

at Den Nasjonale Scene in Bergen

- 1997: My Fair Lady (as Eliza Doolittle),
- 1997: Romeo og Julie (as Julie)
- 2005: Funny Girl
