= The Days of the Commune =

The Days of the Commune is a play by the twentieth-century German dramatist Bertolt Brecht. It dramatises the rise and fall of the Paris Commune in 1871. The play is an adaptation of the 1937 play The Defeat by the Norwegian poet and dramatist Nordahl Grieg. Brecht's collaborator Margarete Steffin translated the play into German in 1938 and Brecht began working on his adaptation in 1947. The process was driven by another Brecht collaborator, Ruth Berlau, who had introduced Brecht to Grieg in 1931.

The work forgoes the individual dramatic hero and focuses on the Paris Commune itself, a collective composite of people. The scenes shift between the different lives of people, going from the street corners of Montmartre to the Paris City Council. On this council, the enemies of the Commune, Thiers and Bismarck, engineer its collapse.

The play details an event that is considered to be the original proletarian revolution and a major event in the socialist revolution. Karl Marx viewed the Commune - which remained the only attempt at a decidedly socialist government during his lifetime - as the prelude of a classless communist society. Brecht's play develops a Leninist interpretation of the Commune.

It is one of the main sources for the first act of Luigi Nono's opera Al gran sole carico d'amore.

It was performed on the 100th anniversary of the Paris Commune, in March 1971, in two performances at Harvard University and at Yale University under the direction of Leonard Lehrman.

A version directed by Zoe Beloff was performed on the streets of New York over the course of several months in 2012, and a film version can be seen on its website.

== Sources ==
- Calabro, Tony, Bertolt Brecht and the Art of Dissemblance, Longwood Academic, 1990
