= Doris Schröder-Köpf =

German politician and journalist

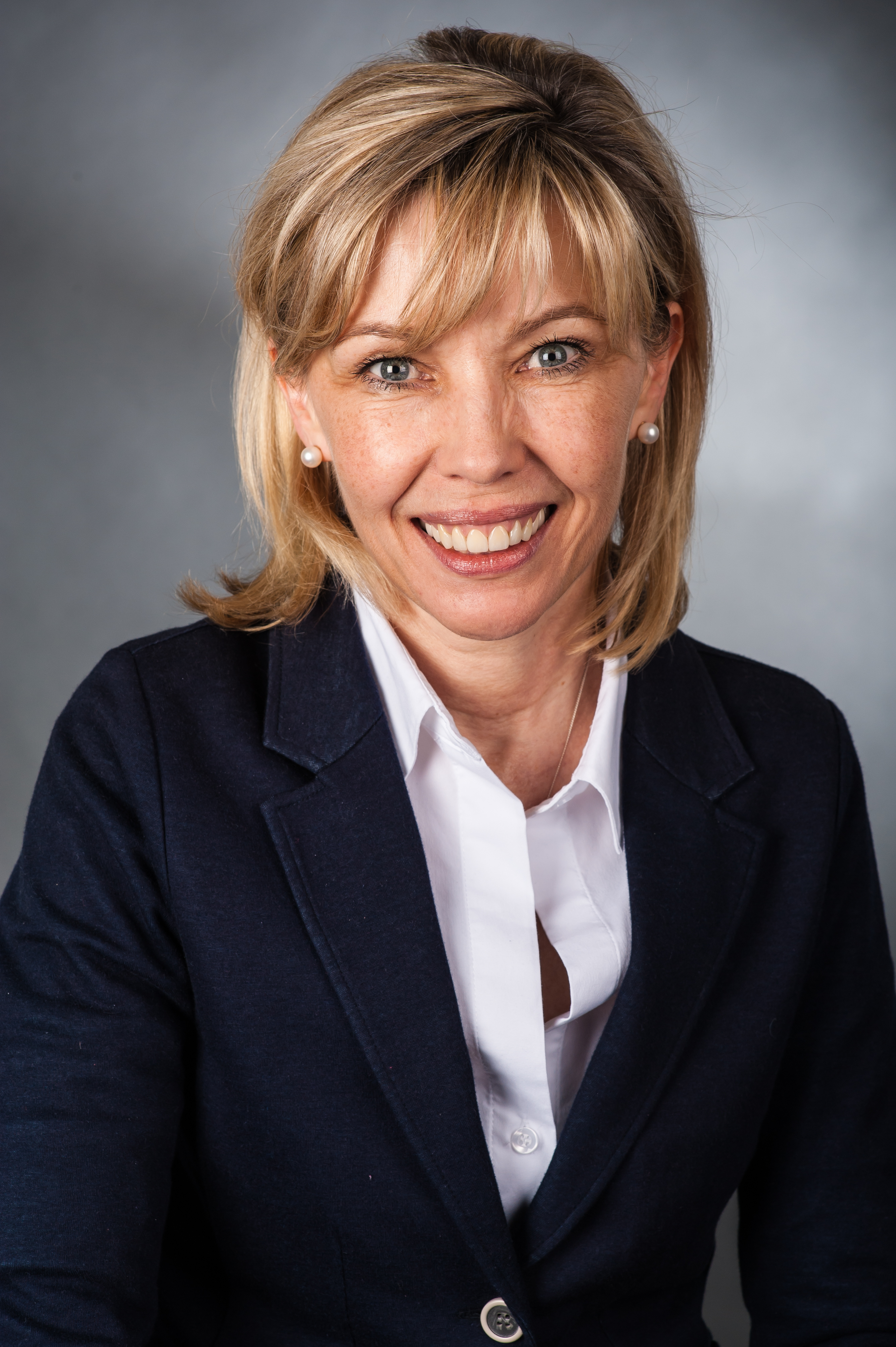
- Schröder-Köpf in 2013

Commissioner for Migration and Participation of Lower Saxony
- Incumbent
- Assumed office 16 April 2013
- Prime Minister: Stephan Weil
- Preceded by: Office established

Member of the Landtag of Lower Saxony for Hannover-Döhren
- Incumbent
- Assumed office 15 October 2017
- Preceded by: Dirk Toepffer

Member of the Landtag of Lower Saxony
- In office 20 January 2013 – 15 October 2017
- Constituency: Party-list proportional representation

Personal details
- Born: Doris Köpf; 5 August 1963 (age 62) Neuburg an der Donau, West Germany
- Spouse: Gerhard Schröder (m. 1997; div. 2018)
- Domestic partner: Boris Pistorius (2016–2022)
- Children: 3
- Occupation: Journalist

Doris Schröder-Köpf (née Köpf; born 5 August 1963) is a German journalist and politician. She was the fourth wife of former German chancellor Gerhard Schröder. Her articles have been published in newspapers and magazines including Bild and Focus.

== Personal life ==
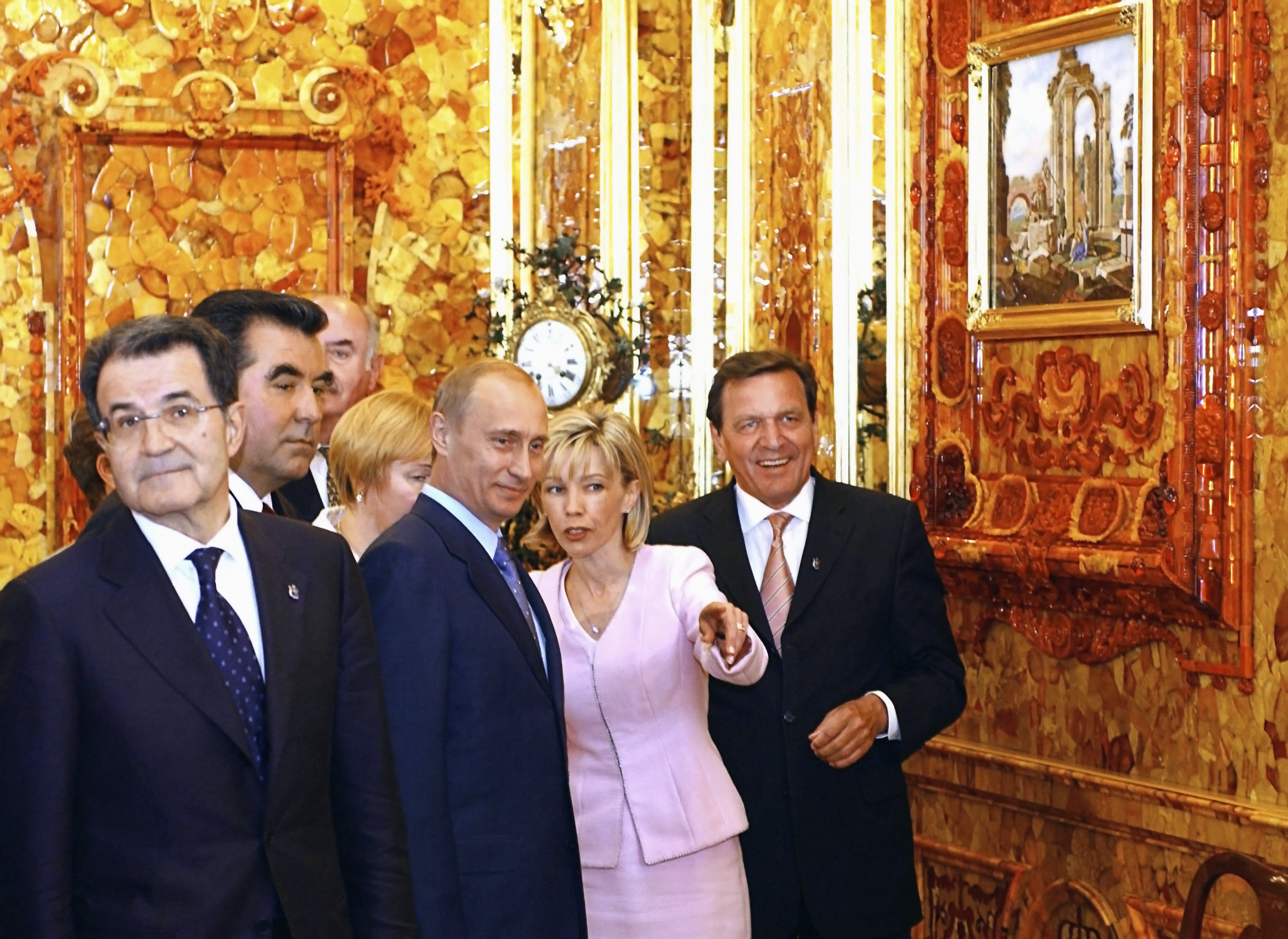
With Vladimir Putin (left) and Gerhard Schröder (right) in 2003

Köpf and partner Sven Kuntze moved to New York City in 1990, where they had a daughter named Klara in the following year. Soon after the birth the pair separated and Köpf moved back to Bavaria with the child. In October 1997, Köpf married Gerhard Schröder, then Minister-President of Lower Saxony. The couple adopted three year old Viktoria from Saint Petersburg in 2004, and a boy named Gregor in 2006.

They separated in March 2015, and divorced in January 2018.

== Political career ==
In April 2013, Schröder-Köpf was elected as a member of the Landtag of Lower Saxony for the Social Democratic Party (SPD), where she serves on the Committee on Internal Affairs and Sports as well as on its Sub-Committee on Media. In addition, she was appointed State Commissioner of Migration and Immigration issues for Lower Saxony in the state government of Minister-President Stephan Weil.

== Other activities ==
- Willy Brandt Prize, Member of the Jury
- Niedersächsische Lotto-Sport-Stiftung, Member of the Board of Trustees
