= Günther Gereke =

German lawyer and politician

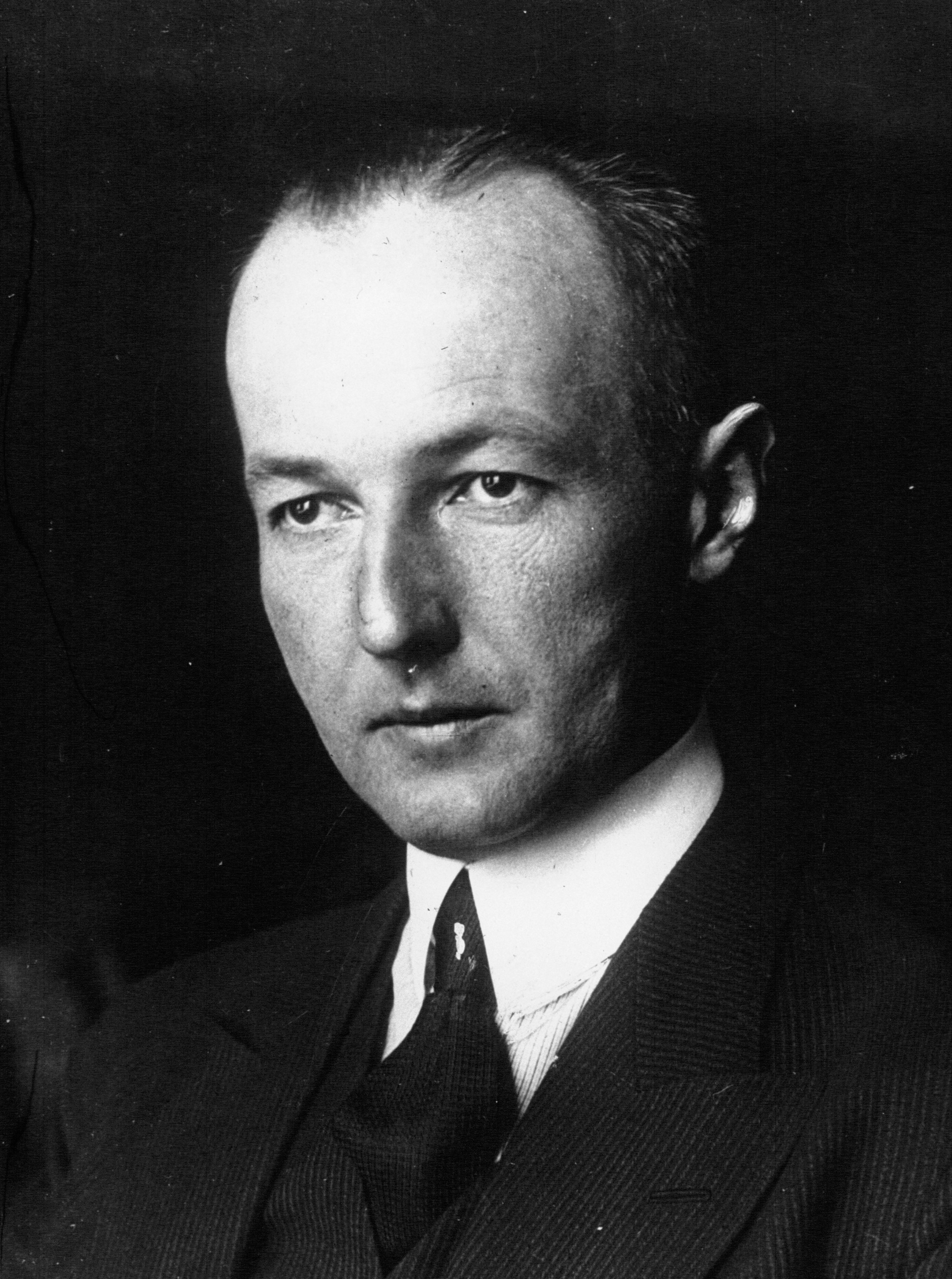
- Gereke in 1932

Reichskommissar for Employment Creation
- In office 3 December 1932 – 30 March 1933
- Chancellor: Kurt von Schleicher; Adolf Hitler
- Preceded by: Office established
- Succeeded by: Office abolished

Minister of the Interior of the State of Lower Saxony
- In office 9 December 1946 – 14 April 1947
- Minister-President: Hinrich Wilhelm Kopf
- Preceded by: Office established
- Succeeded by: Hinrich Wilhelm Kopf

Deputy Minister-President and Minister of Food, Agriculture and Forestry of the State of Lower Saxony
- In office 9 June 1948 – 21 June 1950
- Minister-President: Hinrich Wilhelm Kopf
- Preceded by: August Block
- Succeeded by: Hinrich Wilhelm Kopf

Additional positions
- 1924–1928 1930–1932: Reichstag member
- 1930–1931: Deputy member, Reichsrat
- 1930–1933: Deputy member, Prussian State Council
- 1946–1952: Lower Saxon Landtag member

Personal details
- Born: 6 October 1893 Gruna, Province of Saxony, Kingdom of Prussia, German Empire
- Died: 1 May 1970 (age 76) Neuenhagen bei Berlin, Brandenburg, East Germany
- Party: DNVP (1918–1929); CNBL (1929–1933); CDU (1946–1950); GB/BHE (1950); DSP (1950–1952); CDU (DDR) (after 1952)
- Education: Leipzig University; Ludwig-Maximilians-Universität München; University of Würzburg; Martin Luther University Halle-Wittenberg
- Profession: Lawyer
- Known for: Employment Creation Program of 1933

Military service
- Allegiance: German Empire
- Branch/service: Imperial German Army
- Years of service: 1914–1918
- Battles/wars: World War I (WIA)
- Awards: Wound Badge

Günther Gereke (6 October 1893 – 1 May 1970) was a German lawyer and politician whose political career spanned the Weimar Republic, Nazi Germany, postwar West Germany and East Germany. As the Reichskommissar for Employment Creation, he developed the public works employment plan enacted by the last Weimar cabinet. At first retained in the cabinet formed by Adolf Hitler, he was soon purged and jailed several times under the Nazi regime. Following the end of the Second World War, as a supporter of German unification and an opponent of alliance with the Western Bloc, he broke with German Chancellor Konrad Adenauer and defected to East Germany in 1952.

== Early life ==
Gereke was born in Gruna, a section of Laußig, in the Prussian Province of Saxony. He attended Realgymnasium in Eilenburg and Berlin, obtaining his Abitur in 1912. He studied law, political science and economics at Leipzig University, the Ludwig-Maximilians-Universität München, the University of Würzburg and Martin Luther University Halle-Wittenberg. At the outbreak of the First World War, he volunteered for military service with the Imperial German Army and was wounded several times. He passed the Referendar state examination in 1915. After receiving doctorates in both law and political science in 1916, he passed the Assessor state law examination in 1918. He then pursued an administrative legal career, as a government lawyer in Potsdam.

== Career in the Weimar Republic ==
In 1919, Gereke was appointed the Landrat (district administrator) of the Torgau District. In the same year, he was elected to the provincial parliament of the Province of Saxony as a member of the conservative German National People's Party (DNVP). In October 1921, he was transferred to the government of the Province of Hanover, where he worked as a Regierungsrat (government councilor) until June 1923. He left government service to manage the family estate in Pressel-Winkelmühle in the Düben Heath. He was the founder and president of the Prussian Rural Community Association, as well as the president of the German Rural Community Association. These organizations represented the interests of rural communities and served as a counterweight to the Deutscher Städtetag (German Association of Cities) led by Konrad Adenauer. Gereke was also elected district chairman of the Torgau Landbund (Agricultural League) and regional chairman of all the eastern Landbunde in the Province of Saxony. He also was a lecturer on administrative law at the Agricultural University of Berlin.

From May 1924 to 1928, Gereke served as a member of the Reichstag from electoral constituency 11 (Merseburg) for the DNVP. He was appointed to the Provisional Reich Economic Council in 1928. He left the DNVP in 1929, was involved in the founding of the Christian-National Peasants' and Farmers' Party (CNBL) and was elected the party's deputy chairman. He served another term in the Reichstag from 1930 to 1932 as a CNBL deputy. In addition, he was a member of the provincial parliament of the Province of Saxony. He also sat as a deputy plenipotentiary to the Reichsrat for the Province of Saxony from March 1930 to June 1931, as well as a deputy member of the Prussian State Council from January 1930 to April 1933. In 1932, Gereke served as the chairman of the non-partisan committee to support the re-election of Paul von Hindenburg as Reich President in his successful campaign against Adolf Hitler.

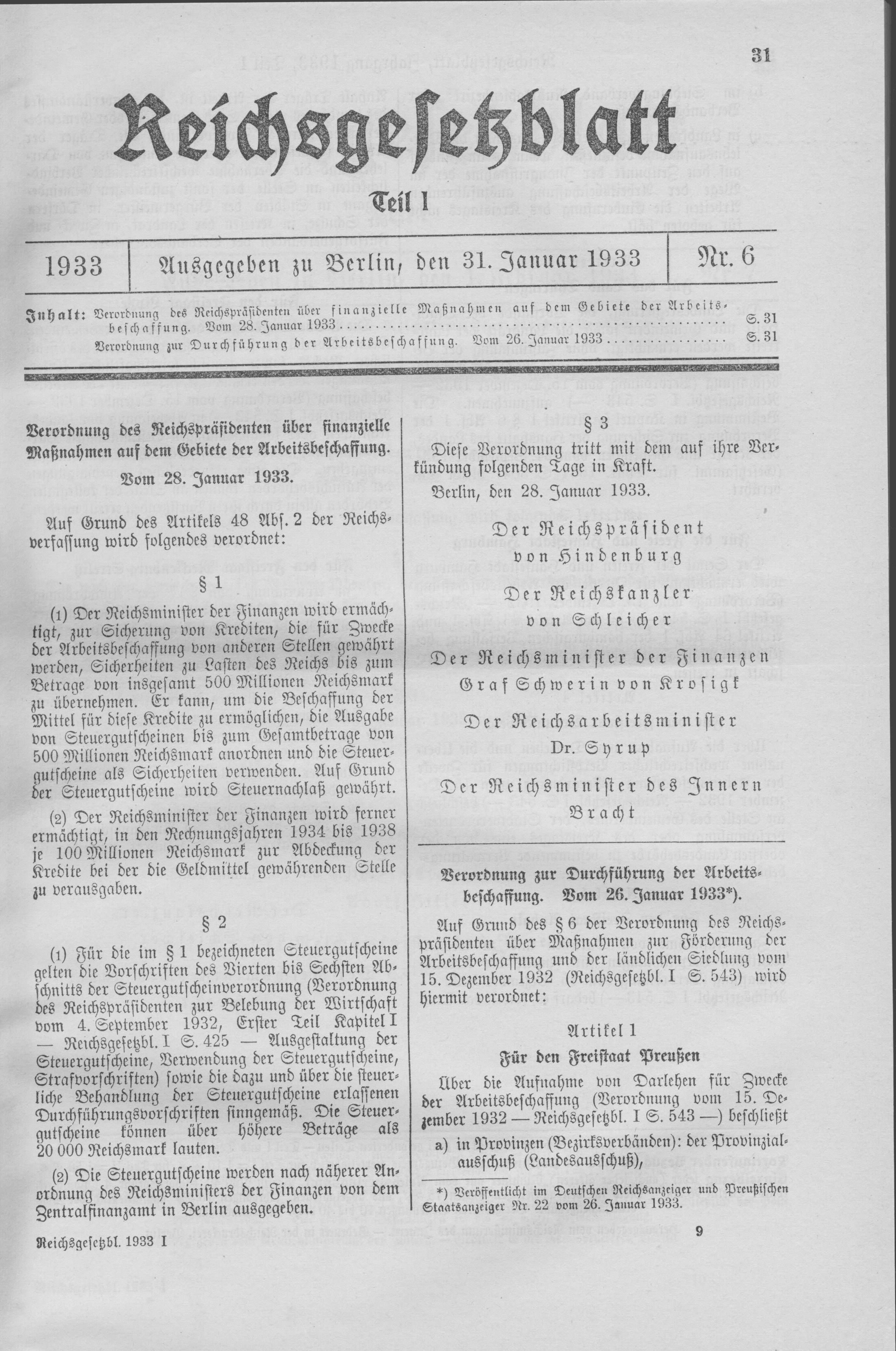
Promulgation of the ordinance authorizing 500 million ℛ︁ℳ︁ to finance Gereke's employment creation plan, published in the Reichsgesetzblatt of 31 January 1933

Gereke was a leading reformist economic theorist and a confidant of the Reichswehr general turned politician, Kurt von Schleicher. Consequently, when Schleicher formed a cabinet in early December 1932, he appointed Gereke as the Reichskommissar for Employment Creation. With Germany still suffering from high levels of unemployment due to the worldwide economic crisis, job creation was the government's top priority. Gereke developed a program for job creation involving massive government financed public works and infrastructure projects that might employ up to half-a-million people. He proposed a program costing 600 million Reichsmarks (ℛ︁ℳ︁) but in negotiations with Reichsbank president Hans Luther on 21 December 1932, he was only able to secure agreement for 500 million ℛ︁ℳ︁. On 28 January 1933, in one of its final actions the Schleicher cabinet gave final approval to the financial measures needed to implement the program. It became law the same day under an emergency decree signed by Hindenburg, and provided 500 million ℛ︁ℳ︁ for public works programs to alleviate unemployment and to stimulate the economy. Ironically, over the course of the next six months when over two million unemployed Germans were given jobs, both Gereke and Schleicher were out of office and Hitler was the political beneficiary.

== Persecution by Nazi Germany ==
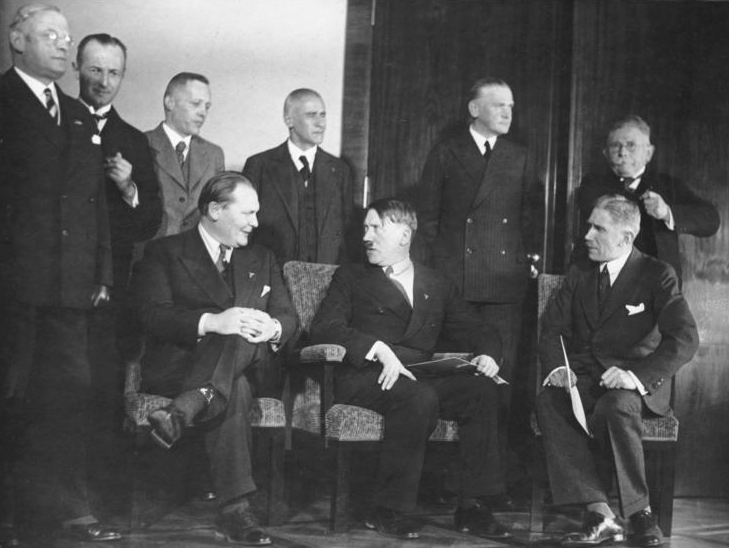
Photo of nine of the twelve members of the Hitler Cabinet on 30 January 1933. Seated from left: Hermann Göring, Adolf Hitler, Franz von Papen; standing: Franz Seldte, Gereke, Lutz Graf Schwerin von Krosigk, Wilhelm Frick, Werner von Blomberg and Alfred Hugenberg

After the resignation of the Schleicher cabinet, Gereke retained his office as Reichskommissar for Employment upon the formation of the Hitler cabinet on 30 January 1933. Never a member of the Nazi Party, he was the first holdover technocrat to be purged from the cabinet. He was arrested by the Gestapo on 23 March 1933, by order of Prussian Interior Minister Hermann Göring. Gereke was charged with embezzlement, allegedly committed in 1932 when he ran the Hindenburg presidential campaign. He was taken to the prison at the Alexanderplatz in Berlin. From there, he was transferred to the prison in Moabit and, finally, to the Tegel Prison. On 30 March 1933, he formally was removed from his position in the cabinet.

Gereke was brought to trial, convicted and, on 16 June 1933, was sentenced to two-and-a-half years in prison and a fine of 100,000 ℛ︁ℳ︁. The Reichsgericht (Supreme Court) reviewed the judgment and sent it back to the lower court. After a second trial lasting four months, he again was found guilty of fraud on 14 July 1934 and the same sentence was imposed. This time, the verdict was upheld by the Reichsgericht on 24 January 1935. Taking into account pre-trial detention, Gereke completed his sentence and was released on 24 September 1935. He retired to his estate but again was arrested in May 1936, this time for allegedly posting a Nazi election campaign poster on his pigsty. Following the outbreak of the Second World War, he was placed under increased police surveillance. After the 20 July 1944 assassination attempt on Hitler, he was imprisoned for the third time and was incarcerated until freed by Allied troops at the end of the war in May 1945.

== Post-war life ==
After the end of the war and the fall of the Nazi dictatorship, the Soviet occupation authorities appointed Gereke as director of the provincial government of Saxony-Anhalt and head of its Interior Department. In the summer of 1946 however, he moved to Lower Saxony in the British occupation zone. There he joined the Christian Democratic Union of Germany (CDU) and was later elected chairman of the CDU Lower Saxon regional association. He became a member of the first Landtag of Lower Saxony in December 1946 and served until February 1952. On 9 December 1946, he was appointed Lower Saxon Minister of the Interior. On 12 February 1947 he was given a leave of absence from this position when an investigation was begun over the old embezzlement allegations, and he resigned on 11 April 1947. From 9 June 1948 to 21 June 1950 he returned to office as the Lower Saxon Deputy Minister President and Minister for Food, Agriculture and Forestry.

Gereke was an ardent supporter of German neutrality and reunification, which was popular in Lower Saxony. In particular, he was opposed to the policy of close cooperation with the Western Bloc as an obstacle to reunification. This was contrary to the course pursued by the federal government under Adenauer. Despite having a position on the CDU executive board, Gereke repeatedly sought contacts with government authorities in the Soviet zone, which were viewed with great suspicion within the party. In early June 1950, without obtaining the government's approval, Gereke went to East Berlin and conferred on joint economic matters with Walter Ulbricht, at that time the Deputy Chairman of the East German Council of Ministers. His actions were criticized in the West German press and he was publicly rebuked by Adenauer who expressed surprise at his actions, which were in opposition to the official government position of refusing to collaborate with the East German regime. This created a public rift with the government and he was forced to resign his ministerial posts on 21 June 1950. He was expelled from the CDU and briefly joined the All-German Bloc/League of Expellees and Deprived of Rights (BHE). However, in November 1950, he co-founded the small Deutsche Soziale Partei (DSP). In the Lower Saxony state elections on 6 May 1951, he was elected as its sole Landtag deputy and held the seat until 26 February 1952.

On 26 July 1952, Gereke defected to East Germany (GDR). In the GDR, he became a member of the Christian Democratic Union (East Germany) and sat on the presidium of the National Council of the National Front of the German Democratic Republic. He was chairman of the National Front district committee for the Frankfurt (Oder) district. He did not obtain any government position, devoting himself instead to horse breeding as president of the Central Office for Breeding and Performance Testing of Thoroughbred and Trotting Horses from 1953 to 1969. He also served as vice president of the International Conference for Thoroughbred Breeding from 1955. He died at Neuenhagen bei Berlin in May 1970.

== Sources ==
- Günther Gereke biography in the Federal Reappraisal Foundation
- Günther Gereke entry in the Lower Saxony Ministers of Agriculture internet portal
- Günther Gereke file in the Lower Saxony and Bremen State Archives
- Günther Gereke in the Files of the Reich Chancellery (Weimar Republic)
- Information about Günther Gereke in the Reichstag database
- Hett, Benjamin Carter (2018). The Death of Democracy: Hitler's Rise to Power and the Downfall of the Weimar Republic. New York: St. Martin's Press. ISBN 978-1-250-21086-9.
- Lilla, Joachim (2005). Der Preußische Staatsrat 1921–1933: Ein biographisches Handbuch. Düsseldorf: Droste Verlag. ISBN 978-3-770-05271-4.
- Schneider, Michael (1986). "The Development of State Work Creation Policy in Germany, 1930-1933". In Stachura, Peter D. (ed.). Unemployment and the Great Depression in Weimar Germany. London: Palgrave Macmillan. ISBN 978-0-333-37646-1.
- Turner, Henry Ashby (1996). Hitler's Thirty Days to Power: January 1933. Reading, MA: Addison-Wesley. ISBN 978-0-20140-714-3.
- Zentner, Christian; Bedürftig, Friedemann, eds. (1997) [1991]. The Encyclopedia of the Third Reich. New York: Da Capo Press. ISBN 978-0-306-80793-0.
