= Nederlaget =

Nederlaget (The Defeat) is a play by the Norwegian writer Nordahl Grieg, published in 1937.

The action is set in the Paris Commune, established in 1871 after the Franco-Prussian War, and the play follows the historical events surrounding this revolutionary uprising. The main character is the pacifist teacher Gabrielle Langevin, but historical figures such as Gustave Courbet also appear. The play's basic problem is whether evil can be fought with evil. In the play, the good forces lose because the rebels are executed toward the end of the play.

Grieg himself said that he wrote the piece under the strong influence of the Spanish Civil War. Bertolt Brecht's play Die Tage der Commune (The Days of the Commune) from 1949 is based on Grieg's text. Brecht's play was first performed in 1957.

== Performances ==
Nederlaget was first staged at the National Theater in Oslo on March 25, 1937, and then at the National Theater in Bergen a month later. It received very positive reviews and was staged at a number of major venues in the Nordic countries.

In 1966, NRK's Television Theater aired a version of the play directed by Per Bronken, with Monna Tandberg, Roy Bjørnstad, Bab Christensen, and Egil Hjorth-Jenssen in the leading roles.
