= Zoe Beloff =

British-born artist

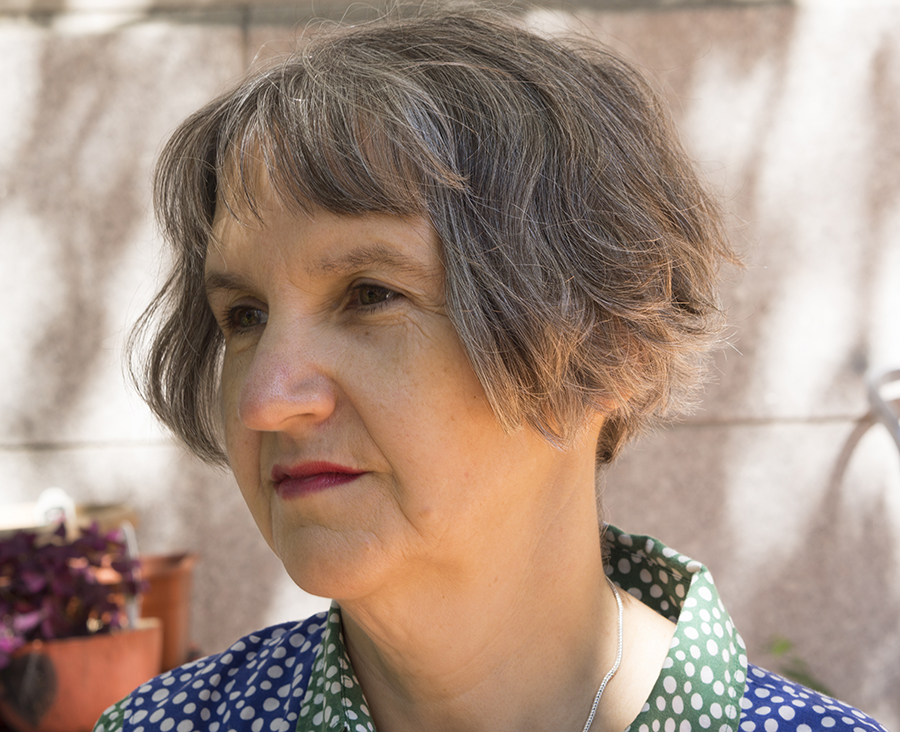
- Zoe Beloff
- Born: United Kingdom
- Occupation: Installation art Film making

Zoe Beloff (born 1958) is an artist residing in New York who works primarily in installation art, film, and drawing.

== Biography ==
Zoe Beloff was raised in Edinburgh, Scotland. In 1980 she moved to New York City, and a few years later she received an MFA in Film from Columbia University. An early work, from 1986, was an apparently unauthorized film adaptation of J. G. Ballard's novel Crash, a short entitled Nightmare Angel that she filmed in collaboration with Susan Emerling.

Beloff's work is heavily involved with history, and she is sometimes considered to be working in the field of media archaeology. She often creates works that intervene in the past, binding together new and old technologies, concepts, and materials in narratives that conflate fiction and fact. She is especially interested in the history of psychoanalysis and the paranormal. In the 1990s, she created the web serial Beyond to play with potential intersections between mind, technology, the paranormal, electromagnetism, language, and desire. One of her most expansive projects is a series of works created around her imaginary early 20th century Coney Island Amateur Psychoanalytic Society and its "founder," Albert Grass, exhibited at Viktor Wynd Fine Art Inc. in London in 2010.

Beloff's collaborators have included John Cale (in a 1989 film Wonderland USA), the Wooster Group—especially actor Kate Valk—and cultural critic Norman M. Klein. In 1996, the Wooster Group commissioned her to develop a satellite CD-ROM project inspired by their theatrical work House/Lights (which was itself derived from Gertrude Stein's Doctor Faustus Lights the Lights). Beloff created Where Where ThereThere Where as a group of moving panoramas representing the technological development of the computer in the 19th and 20th centuries. Treating Stein's texts not as a story but as "a set of logical operations," Beloff used the texts as a kind of code controlling the movement of the panoramas.

In 2012, in response to the Occupy Wall Street movement, Beloff directed a version of Bertolt Brecht's 1949 play The Days of the Commune. Working with cinematographer Eric Muzzy, Beloff set the play in multiple locations around New York City, performing one scene a day in such popular gathering places as Zuccotti Park, an East Village community garden, and the steps of the New York Public Library.

Beloff has published several books. DREAMLAND: The Coney Island Amateur Psychoanalytic Society and Their Circle (2009) details the society's history from Sigmund Freud's (real) 1909 visit to Coney Island up through the 1970s. Albert Grass: The Adventures of a Dreamer (2010) is a comic book prototype by the society's founder, Albert Grass. The Somnambulists: A Compendium of Sources (2008) is an anthology of essays and material that inspired a video installation examining the late 19th century psychoanalytical fixation on the idea of hysteria.

Beloff's work has been recognized internationally, with exhibitions at the Whitney Museum of American Art (New York), the Museum of Modern Art (New York), the Centre Pompidou (Paris), the Museum of Contemporary Art, Antwerp, SITE Santa Fe, and the International Museum of Surgical Science in Chicago. She was included in the 2002 Whitney Biennial and the 2009 Athens Biennale. She received the Foundation for Contemporary Arts Grants to Artists award (1997) and has been honored by a Guggenheim Fellowship (2003). She is a professor in the Departments of Media Studies and Art at Queens College in New York City.

== Works ==
=== Films and 3D performances ===
- The Tramps New World (2021)
- Exile (2018)
- A Model Family in a Model Home (2015)
- Two Marxists in Hollywood (2015)
- Glass House (2015)
- The Days of the Commune (2012)
- Charming Augustine (2005)
- Claire and Don in Slumberland (2002)
- Shadow Land or Light From the Other Side (2000)
- A Mechanical Medium (1999)
- Lost (1995)
- A Trip to the Land of Knowledge (1994)
- Life Underwater (1994)
- Wonderland USA (1989)
- Nightmare Angel (1986)

=== Installations ===
- Emotions Go To Work (2017)
- A World Redrawn (2015)
- The Days of the Commune (2012)
- The Infernal Dream of Mutt and Jeff (2011)
- Dreamland: The Coney Island Amateur Psychoanalytic Society and Their Circle, 1926-1972 (2009)
- The Somnambulists (2007)
- The Ideoplastic Materializations of Eva C. (2004)
- The Influencing Machine of Miss Natalija A. (2001)

=== Interactive media ===
- Where Where There There Where (web serial, 1997; interactive CD-ROM, 1998; Flash version, 2010)
- Beyond (web serial, 1995; interactive CD-ROM, 1997; Flash version, 2009)
- The Influencing Machine of Miss Natalija A. (2001)

=== Books ===
- Parade of the Old New, 2021.
- Reminiscences of a Refugee Childhood / by Halla Beloff; as told to and with illustrations by Zoe Beloff, 2021.
- Between Worlds: An Asylum Seeker in America. Maastricht : Jan van Eyck Academie, 2018.
- A World Redrawn: Eisenstein and Brecht in Hollywood. New York: Christine Burgin, 2016.
- Grass, Albert. The Adventures of a Dreamer: Picture Stories in Colors, vol. 1. Zoe Beloff, ed. New York: Christine Burgin Gallery, 2016.
- The Coney Island Amateur Psychoanalytic Society and Its Circle. New York: Christine Burgin, 2009.
- The Somnambulists: A Compendium of Source Material. New York: Christine Burgin, 2008.
