= Asbjørn Svarstad =

Norwegian journalist

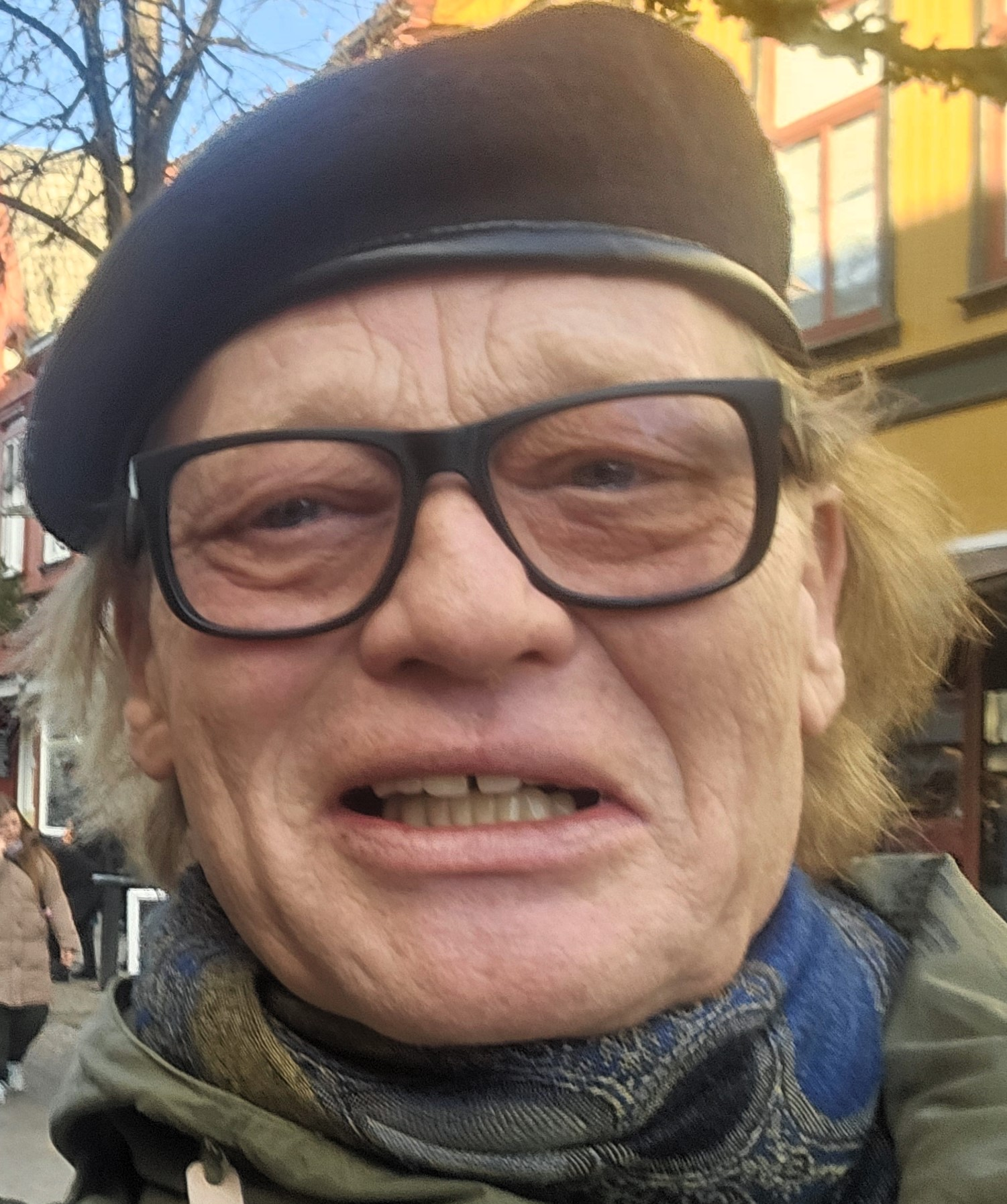
- Asbjørn Svarstad, in Berlin, 2025
- Born: 12 July 1958 (age 67); Rheydt, Germany
- Occupations: Freelance journalist Guide
- Awards: Willy Brandt Prize

Asbjørn Svarstad (born 7 December 1958) is a Norwegian journalist. He started his career in 1973 as an assistant in the local Newspaper Dagningen in Lillehammer. Svarstad has lived for over 30 years in Berlin, and is now working as a freelance journalist there, mainly for the Norwegian online newspaper Nettavisen. Asbjørn Svarstad is also an authorized guide for the Sachsenhausen concentration camp. He received the Willy Brandt Prize in 2024 for his significant contributions to German-Norwegian relations.

== Background ==
Asbjørn Svarstad started his career in the local newspaper Dagningen in 1973. After studying contemporary history at the local college, he worked for some time for the newspaper Verdens Gang. Starting from 1985 he worked for the newspaper Dagbladet. Afterwards he worked from Copenhagen and then Berlin, where he has lived since 1996. For 20 years he was a stringer for the Swedish newspaper Aftonbladet and the Danish newspaper Dagbladet B.T. Most of the articles he has written during his career as a commentator have been about politics and history.

As of 2025, he reports about historical and contemporary events in Germany and Europe for the Norwegian online newspaper Nettavisen. He works for other media outlets in Norway, and is writing several books about Norwegian events in German media. He is also a guide for Norwegian tourists in Berlin. He is an authorized guide of the Sachsenhausen concentration camp.

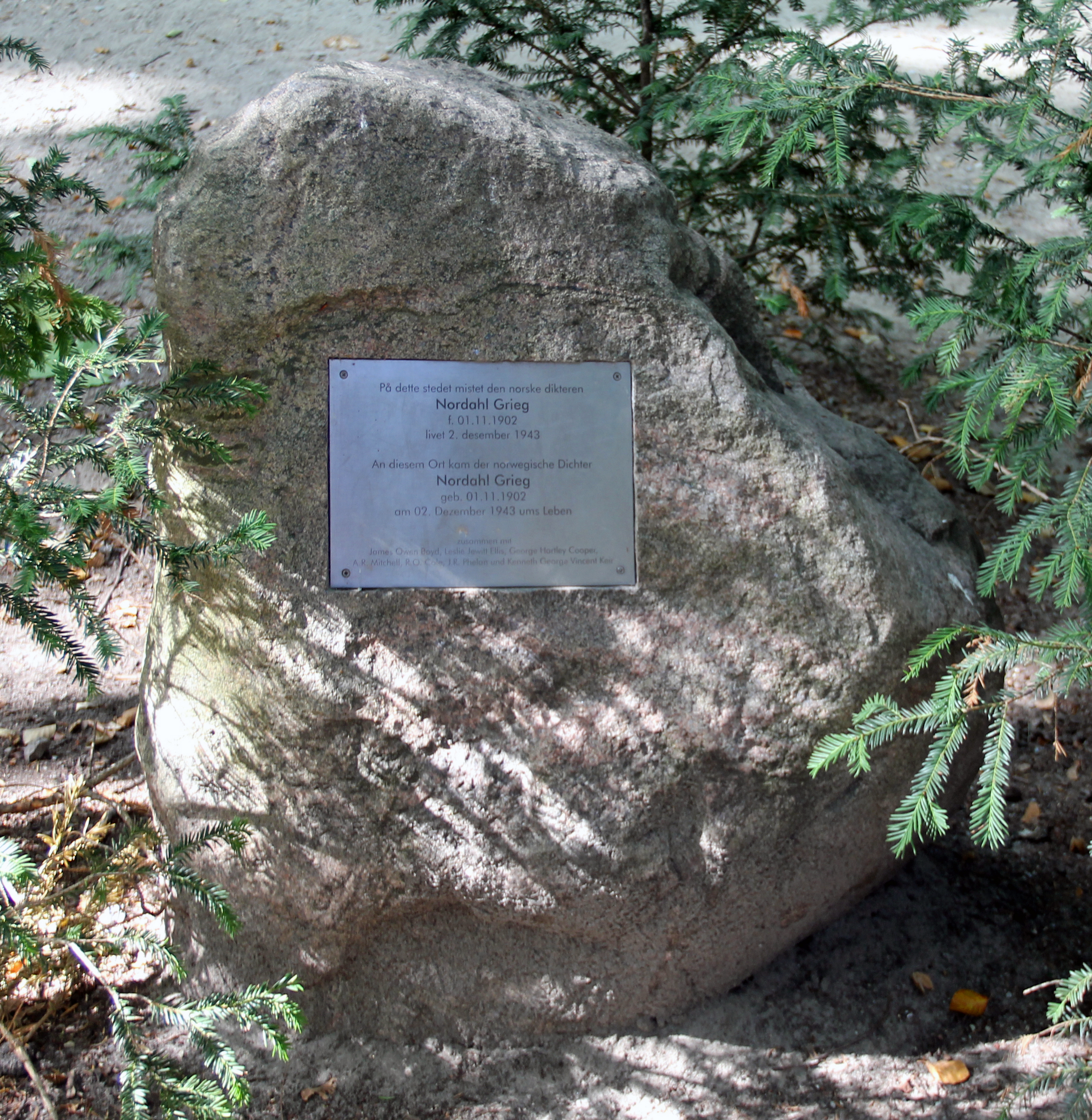
The memorial of the crew on the Lancaster plane of the Royal Australian Air Force (flight LM 316)

Svarstad established a memorial in 2002 in Kleinmachnow outside Berlin, to commemorate an Avro Lancaster bomber from the Royal Australian Air Force that was shot down; the Norwegian poet Nordahl Grieg was among the crew. Svarstad is still searching for the exact place where Grieg is buried.

== Awards ==
Together with the German social democratic politician Franz Thönnes he was awarded the Willy Brandt Prize in 2024. It is awarded to persons or institutions that have made outstanding efforts to promote relations between the two countries. The board of the foundation announced that the awards were given based on the work the two had done to promote connections between Germany and Norway, Svarstad as a journalist and Thönnes as a politician.

During a reception in Rathaus Kleinmachnow on 27 March 2025, Svarstad was inscribed as the 20th person in the "golden book" (equivalent to an honorary citizenship) of the local mayor, for his memorial of Nordahl Grieg and the various German-Norwegian friendship projects that have emerged from this.
