= Friends of the Soviet Union (Norway) =

Pro-Soviet organisation in Norway from 1928-1940

Friends of the Soviet Union (Norwegian: Sovjet-Unionens venner) was an organization in Norway, promoting good relations with the Soviet Union. The organization was founded in 1928. It worked closely with the Communist Party of Norway.

Adam Egede-Nissen was chairman of the organization from 1933-1935. From 1935 to 1940, Nordahl Grieg was chairman of the organization.

The organization, along with the Communist Party, was banned under the German occupation on August 16, 1940.
