= Ursula Pistorius =

German female politician

Member of the Landtag of Lower Saxony
- In office 21 June 1978 – 20 June 1990
- Constituency: Osnabrück-East

Member of the City Council of Osnabrück
- In office 1972–1996

Personal details
- Born: Ursula Raabe; 18 January 1933 Frankfurt (Oder), German Reich
- Died: 4 September 2015 (aged 82)
- Party: Social Democratic Party

Ursula Pistorius (née Raabe; 18 January 1933, in Frankfurt (Oder); 4 September 2015, in Osnabrück) was a German politician (SPD) and a Member of the Landtag of Lower Saxony.

== Early life and education ==
Pistorius first went to grade school and later to a secondary school and a comprehensive school until 1949. In that same year, her family moved to West Germany. In 1952, she got her Abitur at the catholic girls school Angelaschule in Osnabrück.

She worked in a publishing company since 1952 and joined the Trade, Banking and Insurance Union in 1953. She quit her job after giving birth to her first son in 1956.

== Political career ==
Ursula Pistorius became a member of the SPD in 1970. She was on the City Council of Osnabrück from 1972 to 1996. She was a member of various committees during her tenure

She represented the Constituency Osnabrück-East from the 9th to the 11th legislative period of the Landtag of Lower Saxony. She won her constituency directly (Direktmandat) (Note: Due to the German electoral system it is possible for a candidate to fail to win in their First-past-the-post constituency and still enter the Landtag.) in the elections of 1978, 1982 and 1986 respectively. She was deputy chairwoman of the SPD parliamentary caucus in the Landtag from 21 June 1986, to 20 June 1990.

== Personal life ==
She married Ludwig Pistorius (1923–2009) with whom she had three sons born in 1956, 1960 and 1962 respectively. She quit her job after giving birth to her first son. Pistorius' second son is Boris Pistorius, an SPD-politician who was lord mayor of Osnabrück and is the current Federal Minister of Defence since 19 January 2023.

After her retirement, she started a Seniorenstudium (senior studies) and travelled through eastern Europe. In 2015, she died at the age of 82 following a short, heavy illness.

== General references ==
- Barbara Simon: Abgeordnete in Niedersachsen 1946–1994. Biographisches Handbuch. Hrsg. vom Präsidenten des Niedersächsischen Landtages. Niedersächsischer Landtag [Members of the Landtag in Lower Saxony 1946–1994 Biographical Handbook, Ed. President of the Landtag of Lower Saxony] Hannover 1996, S. 292.
