= Ministry for Interior and Sports of Lower Saxony =

- Niedersächsisches Ministerium für Inneres und Sport
- Coat of arms of Lower Saxony

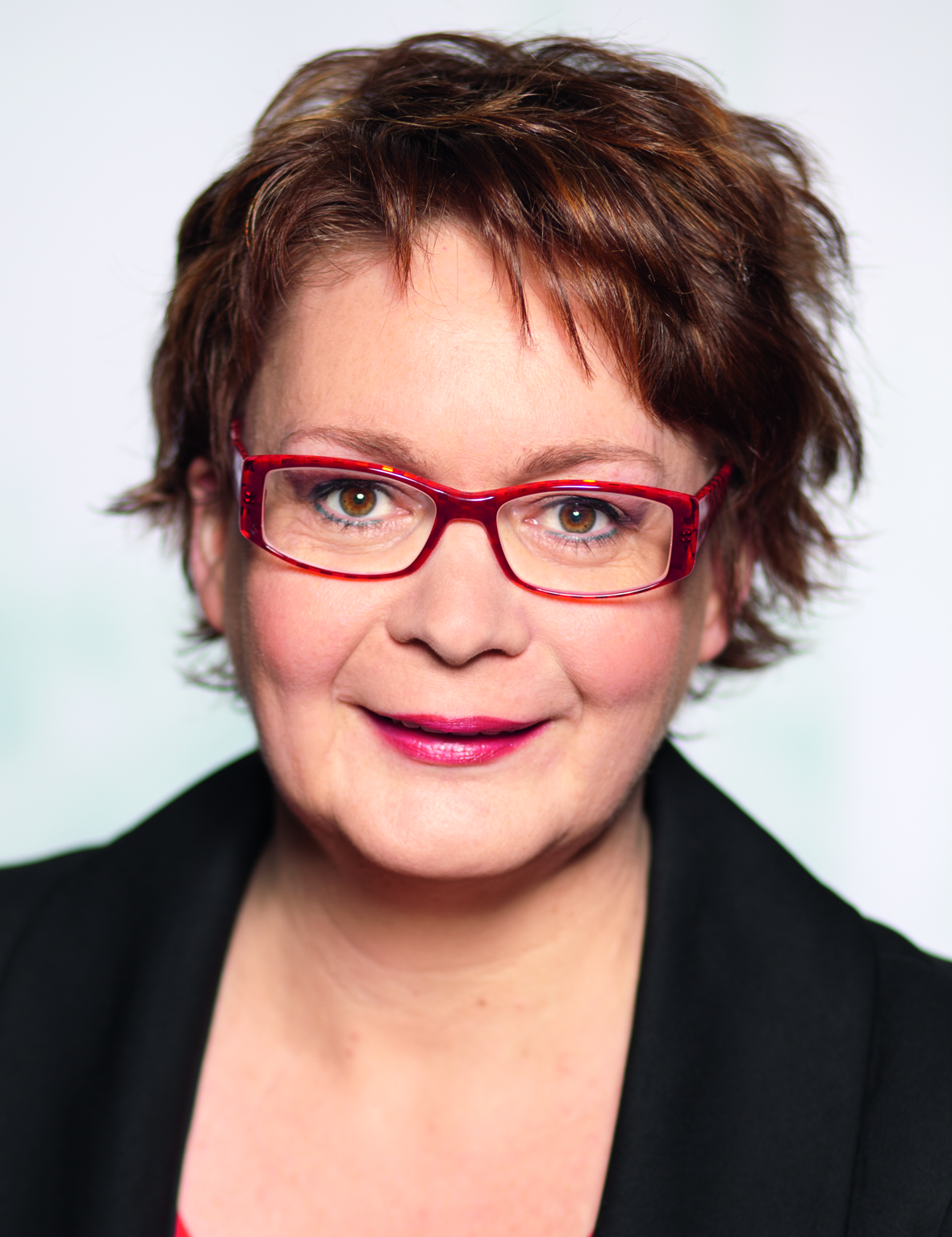
- Incumbent; Daniela Behrens since 19 January 2023
- Residence: Hanover
- Appointer: Stephan Weil
- Inaugural holder: Günther Gereke
- Formation: 12 February 1947
- Website: www.mi.niedersachsen.de

The Ministry for Interior and Sports of Lower Saxony is one of 10 ministries in Lower Saxony. The office is located at the Lavesallee 6 in Hanover.

The current Minister is Daniela Behrends (SPD) who has been the Minister since 19 January 2023. The current state secretary is Stephan Manke who was appointed by Boris Pistorius on 19 February 2013.
