= Boris Pistorius =

German politician (born 1960)

Boris Pistorius MdB
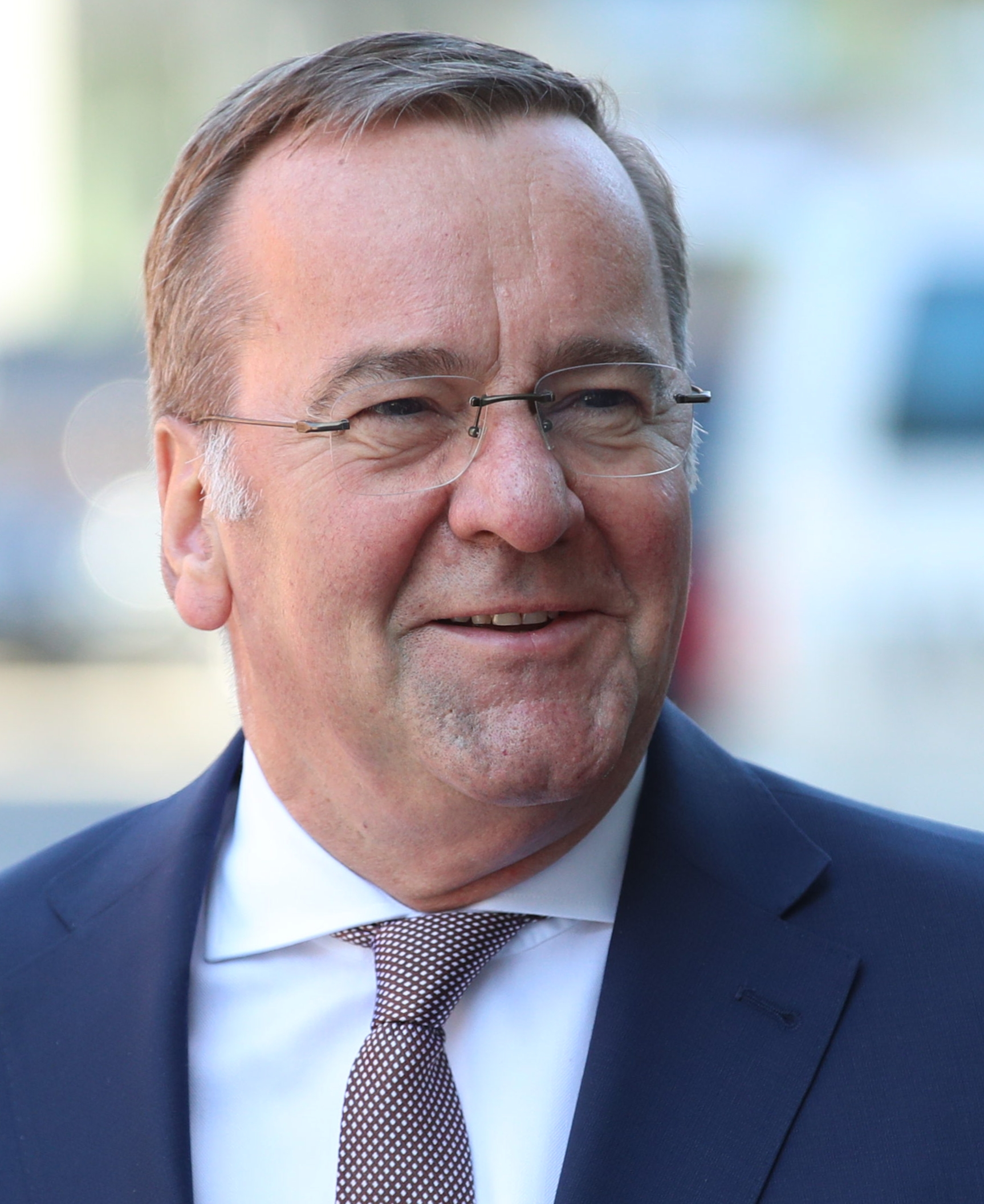
- Pistorius in 2025

Minister of Defence
- Incumbent
- Assumed office 19 January 2023
- Chancellor: Olaf Scholz; Friedrich Merz
- Preceded by: Christine Lambrecht

Minister for Interior and Sports of Lower Saxony
- In office 19 February 2013 – 18 January 2023
- Minister-President: Stephan Weil
- Preceded by: Uwe Schünemann
- Succeeded by: Daniela Behrens

Lord Mayor of Osnabrück
- In office 7 November 2006 – 19 February 2013
- Deputy: Burkhard Jasper; Karin Jabs-Kiesler; Michael Hagedorn; Birgit Strangmann
- Preceded by: Hans-Jürgen Fip
- Succeeded by: Wolfgang Griesert
Parliamentary constituencies
Member of the Bundestag; for Stadt Hannover II
Incumbent
Assumed office 25 March 2025
Preceded by	Daniela De Ridder
Member of the Landtag of Lower Saxony; for Osnabrück-West
In office 14 November 2017 – 19 January 2023
Preceded by	Burkhard Jasper
Succeeded by	Daniela Behrens

Personal details
- Born: Boris Ludwig Pistorius; 14 March 1960 (age 66) Osnabrück, Lower Saxony, West Germany
- Party: Social Democratic (since 1976)
- Spouse: Sabine Pistorius (died 2015)
- Domestic partners: Doris Schröder-Köpf (2016–2022); Julia Schwanholz (2022–present)
- Children: 2
- Parent: Ursula Raabe (mother)
- Education: University of Münster; Osnabrück University; Catholic University of the West
- Occupation: Politician; Civil Servant; Lawyer; Foreign Trade Clerk
- Website: Official website

Military service
- Allegiance: Germany
- Branch/service: Bundeswehr
- Years of service: 1980–1981
- Unit: German Army (Heer) / Flugabwehrregiment 11

Boris Ludwig Pistorius (German: [ˈbɔʁɪs pɪsˈtoːʁiʊs]; born 14 March 1960) is a German lawyer and politician of the Social Democratic Party of Germany (SPD) who has been serving as Federal Minister of Defence in the governments of successive Chancellors Olaf Scholz and Friedrich Merz since 2023, making him the only minister of the Scholz cabinet to retain his position. He is considered to be amongst the most popular politicians in Germany, receiving significant popular approval ever since his appointment to the Defence Ministry.

Since the 2025 federal election, he is a member of the 21st Bundestag. Earlier in his career, Pistorius was a member of the State Parliament of Lower Saxony, and served as State Minister for Interior and Sports in the state government of Lower Saxony (Cabinet Weil II) from 2013 to 2017. From 2006 to 2013, Pistorius was Lord Mayor of Osnabrück.

== Early life and education ==
Pistorius was born in Osnabrück, the second son of Ursula Pistorius (née Raabe; 1933–2015) and Ludwig Pistorius (1923–2009). His mother was a member of the Osnabrück city council from 1972 to 1996 and also served as a member of the Landtag of Lower Saxony from 1978 to 1990.

After taking his abitur at the Ernst-Moritz-Arndt Gymnasium in Osnabrück, he was conscripted to military service in the Bundeswehr in 1980 before taking up law studies at the University of Münster and Osnabrück University, and also, for a brief period, at the Catholic University of the West.

== Early career ==
Pistorius worked as the personal advisor to State Minister for Interior of Lower Saxony Gerhard Glogowski in government led by Minister-President Gerhard Schröder from 1991 to 1995, and was the deputy head of his office from 1995 to 1996.

== Political career ==
=== Career in local politics ===
Pistorius joined the SPD in 1976.

Pistorius was part of the city council from 1996 until 2013 and from 1999 to 2002 he served as second mayor of Osnabrück.

Pistorius served as Mayor of Osnabrück, starting his mayoral term on 7 November 2006 winning with 55.5% against Wolfgang Griesert who would later go on to become the Mayor after Pistorius's resignation due to his position at the Lower Saxony government in 2013.

=== State Minister of the Interior and Sports (2013–2022) ===
After the Lower Saxony state elections in 2013, Pistorius was sworn in as State Minister of the Interior and Sports at the constituent session of the 17th State Parliament of Lower Saxony on 19 February 2013.

From 2013 to 2017, Pistorius was one of the state's representatives on the German Bundesrat; from 2017, he was an alternate member. In this capacity, he was a member of the German-Russian Friendship Group set up in cooperation with the Russian Federation Council. He was also an alternate member of the German delegation to the NATO Parliamentary Assembly, where he was part of the Political Committee, its Sub-Committee on NATO Partnerships and its Sub-Committee on Transatlantic Relations.

During his time in office in state government, Pistorius was widely seen as standing out in his state for his tough stance on Islamist radicalism, terror threats, organized crime and far-right extremism.

Klaus Dierker, a regular, middle-aged police officer without special qualifications, rose to the chief of the State Reception Authority of Lower Saxony. The State Reception Authority is the unit within the Ministry for Interior and Sports which is responsible for the processing and deportation of illegal aliens. Due to a sudden career such as this being highly unusual for someone with his education and professional background, the fact that Dierker has been a very close personal friend of Pistorius since their childhood caused suspicions of cronyism to rise in the media. Pistorius and Dierker never disclosed their personal relationship to the public. Under Dierker, the majority of attempted deportations fail.

=== Role in national politics ===
In the negotiations to form a fourth coalition government under Chancellor Angela Merkel's leadership following the 2017 federal elections, Pistorius was part of the working group on internal and legal affairs, led by Thomas de Maizière, Stephan Mayer and Heiko Maas.

In the 2019 SPD leadership election, Pistorius was a candidate for the position as the party's co-chair, together with Saxony State Minister Petra Köpping. Köpping and Pistorius came in fifth place, receiving only 14.41% of the vote.

In the negotiations to form a so-called traffic light coalition of the SPD, the Green Party and the Free Democrats (FDP) following the 2021 German elections, Pistorius led his party's delegation in the working group on migration and integration; the co-chairs from the other parties were Luise Amtsberg and Joachim Stamp.

=== Federal Minister of Defence (2023–present) ===
On 17 January 2023, Chancellor Olaf Scholz announced that Pistorius would succeed Christine Lambrecht, who resigned on 16 January after numerous political blunders, as Minister of Defence in Chancellor Olaf Scholz's cabinet. This came as a surprise to many political observers, with SPD co-leader Lars Klingbeil and Bundestag Armed Forces Commissioner Eva Högl being floated most often as replacements. The appointment was criticized, as it would mean breaking the gender parity Scholz had promised upon the cabinet's formation. A plausible explanation is that, in the acute European military crisis – many people, including people in the Bundeswehr – thought it irresponsible to again appoint somebody without any military experience, and to instead appoint based on competency rather than gender.

He was retained by Friedrich Merz following the formation of his cabinet following the 2025 federal election.

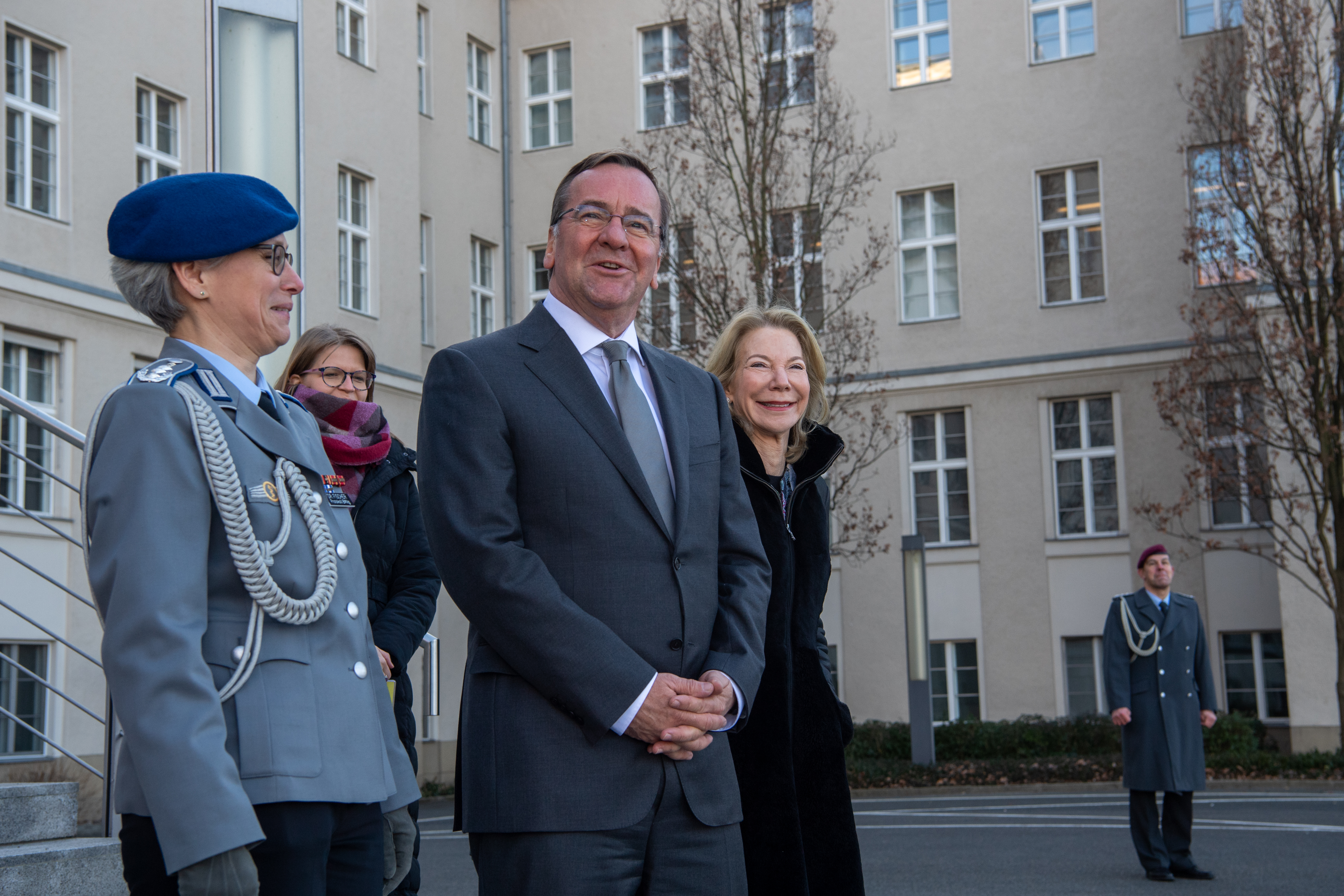
Pistorius with US Ambassador to Germany Amy Gutmann in 2023

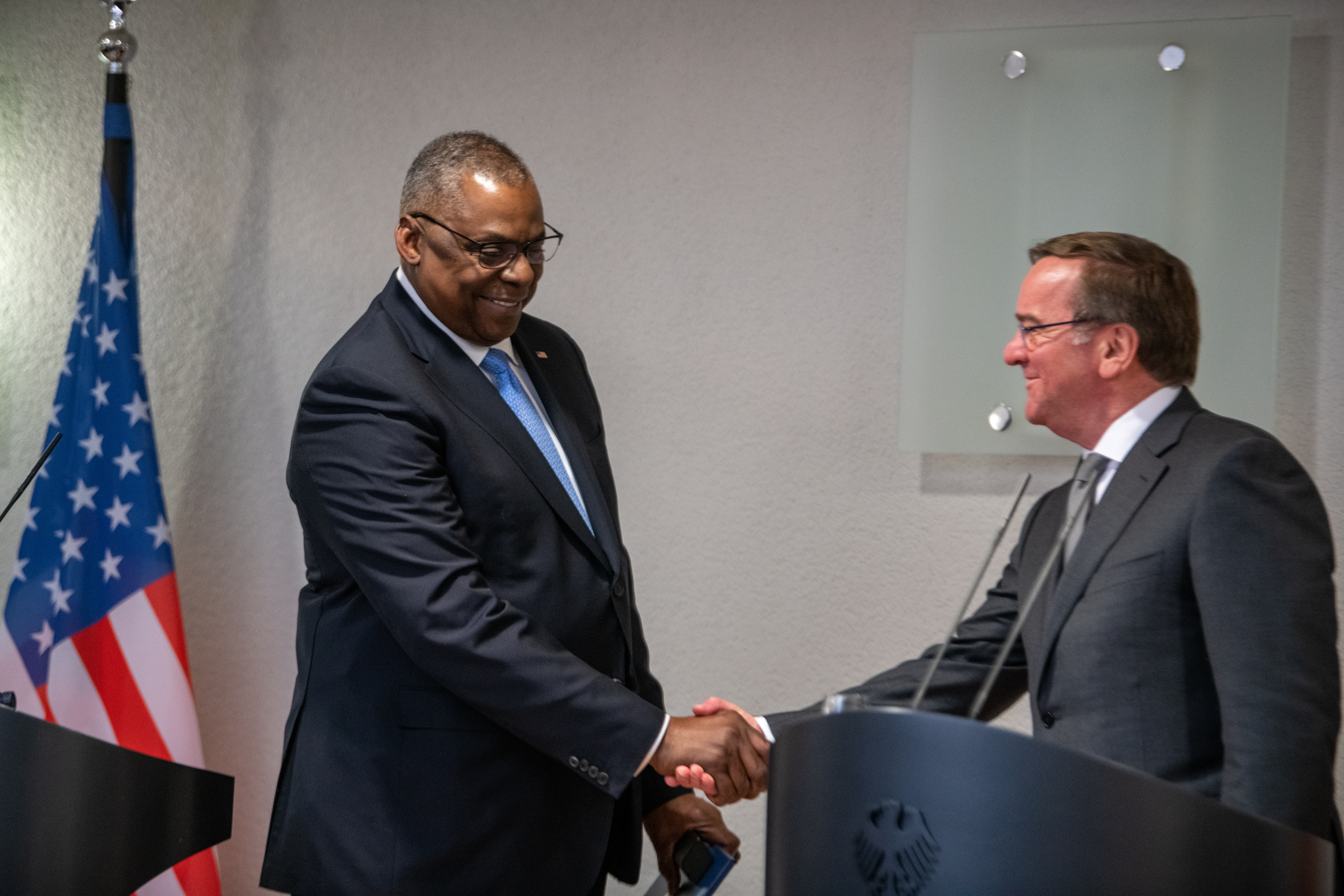
Pistorius and then-US Secretary of Defense Lloyd Austin in Berlin, Germany, 19 January 2023

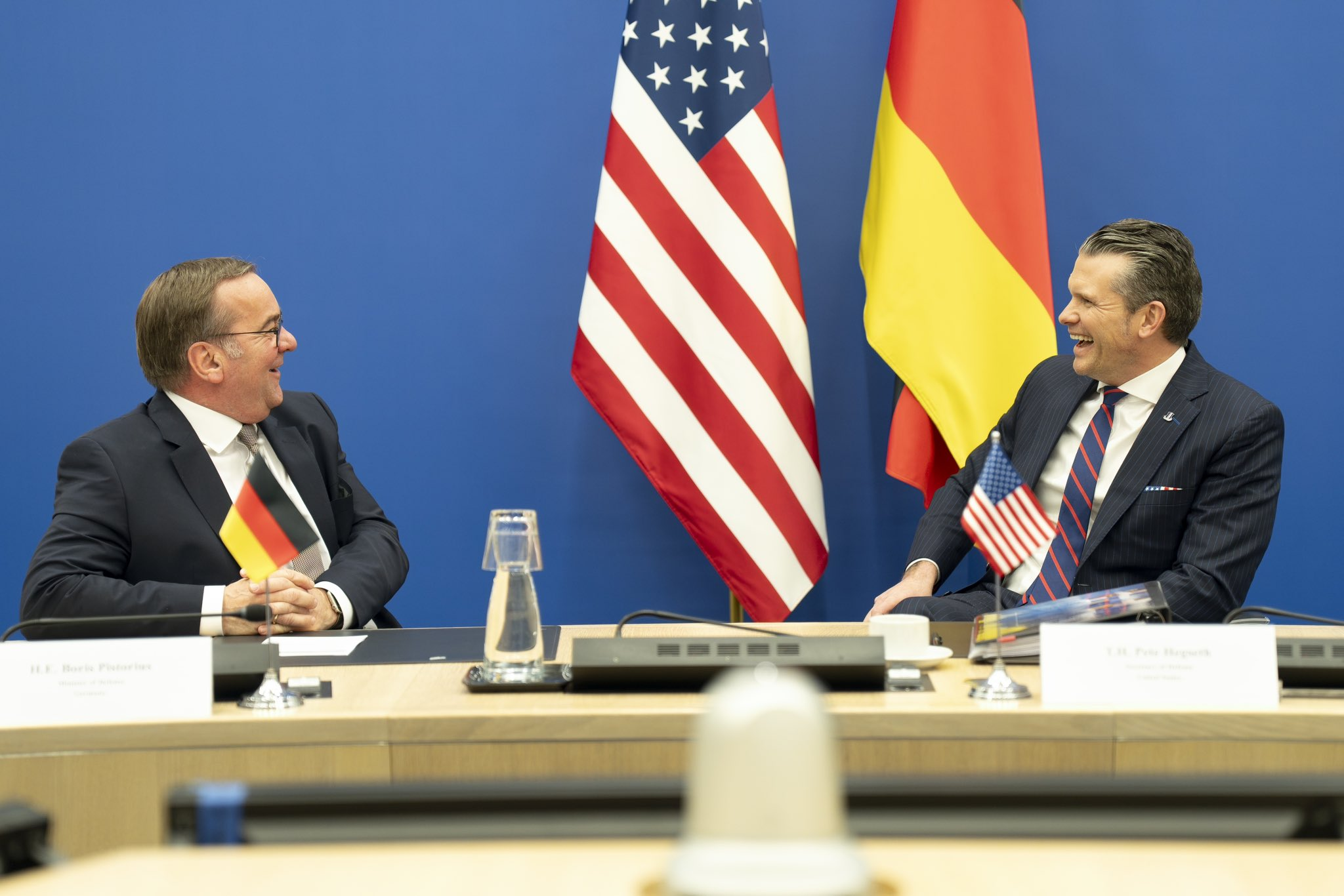
Pistorius with US Secretary of Defense Pete Hegseth in Brussels, Belgium, February 2025

Pistorius was formally appointed by German president Frank-Walter Steinmeier and eventually took the oath of office at the Bundestag on 19 January 2023.

During his first year in office, Pistorius announced military aid worth €2.7 billion (US$3.0 billion) to Ukraine both in May 2023 and €1 billion (US$1.1 billion) in October 2023.

In March 2023, Pistorius participated in the first joint cabinet meeting of the governments of Germany and Japan in Tokyo, chaired by Chancellor Scholz and Prime Minister Fumio Kishida. In October 2023, he joined the first joint cabinet retreat of the German and French governments in Hamburg, chaired by Scholz and President Emmanuel Macron.

In September 2023, Pistorius and his Israeli counterpart, Yoav Gallant, signed a "historic" agreement for Germany to purchase the Israeli-made Arrow 3 missile defense system for approximately €3.3 billion ($3.5 billion), making it the largest defense deal in Israel's history.

In July 2024, Christian Lindner warned Boris Pistorius that no additional funds would be provided for military modernization beyond what the coalition government had already agreed upon. This followed a budget decision that left Pistorius, responsible for revitalizing Germany's defenses amid increased security concerns following Russia's invasion of Ukraine, feeling disappointed. Lindner defended the funding arrangement, highlighting a special 100-billion-euro fund that had been made available to Pistorius for military upgrades, a resource unprecedented for previous defense ministers, and urged efficient use of these resources. This budgetary restraint came as the IMF noted that Germany's low public infrastructure investment was affecting its economic growth, despite having the lowest debt-to-GDP ratio in the G7.

Under Pistorius' leadership, Germany joined the US-led United Nations Command (UNC) in South Korea in August 2024, becoming the 18th nation to do so. Also in August 2024, Pistorius and his Philippine counterpart Gilberto Teodoro committed to establishing long-term relations between their armed forces to expand training and bilateral exchanges, explore opportunities to expand bilateral armaments cooperation and engage in joint projects.

In July 2024, the United States announced its intention to deploy long-range missiles in Germany beginning in 2026. US weapons in Germany would include SM-6 and Tomahawk cruise missiles and hypersonic weapons. The United States' decision to deploy missiles in Germany has been compared to the deployment of Pershing II launchers in Western Europe in the 1980s. The decision was supported by Boris Pistorius and German Chancellor Olaf Scholz. Critics say the move would trigger a new arms race. According to Russian military analysts, it would be extremely difficult to distinguish between a conventionally armed missile and a missile carrying a nuclear warhead, and Russia could respond by deploying longer-range nuclear systems targeting Germany.

Polling conducted in 2024 found Pistorius to be the most popular politician in Germany. He declined to be the SPD's Chancellor-candidate in the 2025 election.

== Other activities ==
=== Corporate boards ===
- Münster Osnabrück Airport, Member of the supervisory board (2011–2013)
- Niedersächsische Sparkassenstiftung, Member of the Board

=== Non-profit organizations ===
- Munich Security Conference, Member of the Advisory Council (since 2023)
- Business Forum of the Social Democratic Party of Germany, Member of the Political Advisory Board (since 2020)
- Robert Enke Foundation, Member of the Board of Trustees (since 2017)
- Aloys & Brigitte Coppenrath Foundation, Member of the Board

== Political positions ==
In 2018, Pistorius suggested that sanctions against Russia should be reviewed. In 2021, he demanded that Germany order the messaging program Telegram removed from Apple Inc.'s and Google's app stores if it continues to ignore requests to help track down extremist content. Amid the 2022 Russian invasion of Ukraine, Pistorius condemned what he has called Russia's "brutal attacks" on Ukraine. In May 2022, he said that Russian sympathizers must not glorify Russia's war against Ukraine on German streets. In October 2023, following the outbreak of the Gaza war, Pistorius expressed full support for Israel. He told Israeli Defence Minister Yoav Gallant that "whatever we can do to support you, with material support, we will do this." In January 2024, he warned that Russia could attack NATO in 5 to 8 years. In April 2024, Pistorius compared Russian President Vladimir Putin to Nazi Germany's leader Adolf Hitler and urged Europe to prepare for a full-scale war with Russia, saying that "Putin will not stop once the war against Ukraine is over."

In August 2026, in an op-ed for Frankfurter Allgemeine Zeitung in the lead-up to the 2026 Saxony-Anhalt state election, Pistorius called for the banning of state branches of the AfD considered volkisch. Pistorius, along with SPD colleagues, protested the election of Tobias Rausch as President of the Landtag of Saxony-Anhalt.

== Personal life ==
Pistorius has two daughters with his wife Sabine, who died in 2015 due to cancer. He was in a relationship with Doris Schröder-Köpf from 2016 until spring 2022. He has been in a relationship with Julia Schwanholz, a professor at the University of Duisburg-Essen, since 2022.

== Awards and honours ==
- 2009: Order of Merit (Portugal)
- 2019: Schlesierschild of the Landsmannschaft Schlesien
