= Otto Mortensen =

Danish composer and conductor

Otto Hübertz Mortensen (18 August 1907 – 30 August 1986) was a Danish composer and conductor. He also played the organ and piano. For a number of years he worked at the Royal Danish Theatre as a rehearser for the opera, and later worked at Aarhus University.

As a composer, Mortensen composed both vocal works and instrumental music. He is most famous for arranging countless choral works and for writing the melodies for a number of Danish songs, e.g. Septembers himmel, Min skat, Sommervise (Du danske sommer jeg elsker dig…), and the Norwegian Kringsatt av fiender (lyrics by Nordahl Grieg). In the years leading up to his death, he worked on new melodies to a number of psalms, e.g. At sige verden ret farvel.

The melody for the poem by Helge Rode, Du gav os de blomster, som lyste imod os, was selected by the Danish Ministry of Culture in 2006 as one of 12 songs to be a part of the Canon of Culture (Danish: Kulturministeriets Kulturkanon) in the category musical scores.

== List of compositions ==
The following works do not make a complete listing.

- Quintette pour Flûte, Hautbois, Clarinette, Cor et Basson (1944)
- Quartet 1937 (1937)
- Sonata for oboe and piano
- 10 Danish Songs (1928–1943)
- Four Songs (1945)
- Three Songs (1946)
- Selected Songs (1939–1949)
- Sange af Nordiske Digtere (10 songs, undated), for voice & piano
- Songs (7 songs, undated), for voice & piano
- Septembers himmel er så blå, for voice & piano
- Min Skat. Hun er sød, hun er blød (My Sweetheart. She is neat, she is sweet), song for voice & piano
- Septembers himmel er så blå (The Skies of September Are So Blue), for voice and piano
- Sommervise. Du danske sommer, jeg elsker dig (A Song to Summer. I love you, Danish summer mine), for voice and piano
- Det var en lørdag aften, song
- Du gav os de blomster (Danmark)
- Lørdag aften (Saturday Evening), for chorus

== See also ==
- List of Danish composers
