= Til Ungdommen =

Norwegian poem by Nordahl Grieg

Til ungdommen (English: "To the Youth"), also known by the words of the first line Kringsatt av fiender ("Surrounded by Enemies"), is a poem from 1936 by Norwegian poet and writer Nordahl Grieg (1902–1943) . It was set to music in 1952 by the Danish composer Otto Mortensen (1907–1986). The song has been recorded by various artists and has been sung at meetings held by various organizations. After the terror attacks of 22 July 2011, it was used in many memorial gatherings and services.

== History ==
The poem was written in 1936 by Nordahl Grieg at Ny-Hellesund in Søgne Municipality for use by the Norwegian Students' Society after a request by Trond Hegna (1898–1992) who was a Member of Parliament. The poem is directly inspired by the Spanish civil war, which had broken out the same summer. It was set to music by composer Otto Mortensen in 1952, some nine years after Grieg's death.

In 1988 it was recorded by Grex Vocalis. In 2000 it was orchestrated by Tormod Tvete Vik and sung by Norwegian actress and singer Herborg Kråkevik in her CD titled Kråkeviks Songbok. Kråkevik's version excludes verses 7-10.

The song has also been recorded by Danish rock musician Kim Larsen, first on his album 231045-0637 from 1979. However, on this album it was called 682 A rather than Til Ungdommen, a reference to the song's listing in the Danish folk high school songbook. Kim Larsen also included the song on his live album Kim i Cirkus (1985), and on the live CD and DVD En Lille Pose Støj on YouTube (2007), on these two occasions titling it by the first line in the Danish version of the poem, Kringsat af Fjender.

The song has also been recorded by Norwegian experimental band The Soundbyte. Til Ungdommen was sung by Norwegian singer Torhild Ostad on 23 November 2003 in Kleinmachnow near Berlin, Germany, as the memorial stone was unveiled at the site where the poet Nordahl Grieg died when the Lancaster bomber in which he was flying as a war correspondent hit the ground on 2 December 1943.

On 24 July 2011, under enormous worldwide media coverage, the song was sung by the congregation of the Oslo Cathedral memorial service in relation to the 2011 Norway attacks. It was also sung at Denmark's official Memorial Service at Vor Frue Kirke in Copenhagen on 27 July 2011.

Herborg Kråkevik's 2000 version of the song was re-released in 2011 immediately after the attacks, reaching #1 on VG-lista, the official Norwegian Singles Chart, in its first week of release.

Sissel Kyrkjebø sang the song as the concluding performer during the Norwegian National Memorial Ceremony on 21 August 2011 in the Oslo Spektrum arena, which was held to remember those killed in the 2011 Norway attacks. The program was broadcast on all TV channels across Norway. Ingebjørg Bratland sang the song on 30 July 2011 in the Oslo Cathedral.

== Text of the poem ==
Til ungdommen by Nordahl Grieg.

Original Norwegian (Note: Line breaks, punctuation and spelling as per ISBN 82-05-18666-9 – Nordahl Grieg's published poem book.)

Kringsatt av fiender, gå
inn i din tid!
Under en blodig storm –
vi deg til strid!

Kanskje du spør i angst,
udekket, åpen:
hva skal jeg kjempe med,
hva er mitt våpen?

Her er ditt vern mot vold,
her er ditt sverd:
troen på livet vårt,
menneskets verd.

For all vår fremtids skyld,
søk det og dyrk det,
dø om du må – men:
øk det og styrk det!

Stilt går granatenes
glidende bånd.
Stans deres drift mot død,
stans dem med ånd!

Krig er forakt for liv.
Fred er å skape.
Kast dine krefter inn:
døden skal tape!

Elsk – og berik med drøm –
alt stort som var!
Gå mot det ukjente,
fravrist det svar.

Ubygde kraftverker,
ukjente stjerner –
skap dem, med skånet livs
dristige hjerner!

Edelt er mennesket,
jorden er rik!
Finnes her nød og sult,
skyldes det svik.

Knus det! I livets navn
skal urett falle.
Solskinn og brød og ånd
eies av alle.

Da synker våpnene
maktesløs ned!
Skaper vi menneskeverd,
skaper vi fred.

Den som med høyre arm
bærer en byrde,
dyr og umistelig,
kan ikke myrde.

Dette er løftet vårt
fra bror til bror:
vi vil bli gode mot
menskenes (Note: Nordahl Grieg wrote "menskenes" due to poetic metre, however proper Norwegian riksmål spelling is "menneskenes".) jord.

Vi vil ta vare på
skjønnheten, varmen –
som om vi bar et barn
varsomt på armen!

English translation

Surrounded by enemies, walk
into your time!
Through blood-red storms –
we call you to fight!

Perhaps you ask in fear,
unshielded, bare:
what shall I fight with,
what is my weapon?

Here is your shield against violence,
here is your sword:
faith in the life we share,
the worth of human beings.

For the sake of all our future,
seek it and cherish it,
die if you must – but:
increase it and strengthen it!

Silently glide
the belts of grenades.
Stop their march toward death,
stop them with spirit!

War is contempt for life.
Peace is to create.
Throw all your strength into it:
death shall be defeated!

Love – and enrich with dreams –
all that was great!
Go toward the unknown,
wrest answers from it.

Unbuilt power plants,
undiscovered stars –
create them with daring minds,
lives spared from scars!

Noble is man,
rich is the earth!
If hunger and need exist,
it is caused by betrayal.

Crush it! In life’s name,
injustice must fall.
Sunlight and bread and spirit
belong to us all.

Then weapons will sink,
powerless and still!
If we build human worth,
peace we fulfil.

He who with his right arm
bears a burden,
precious and irreplaceable,
cannot murder.

This is our promise,
from brother to brother:
we shall be kind to
the Earth of humankind.

We will protect
its beauty, its warmth –
as though we carried a child
gently in our arms.

== Song recordings ==
- Kim Larsen's version (in 1979) of the song is titled "682A" — a reference to its place in Højskolesangbogen, the Danish Folk High School songbook
- The song was performed live in July 1988 by Kim Larsen, Björn Afzelius, Åge Aleksandersen and Jahn Teigen, with verses alternating between Danish and Norwegian. The song was recorded and shown live on television, but never released on CD or vinyl.
- Anders Buaas has recorded his non-vocal version of a song called Til Ungdommen on his musical work "The Witches of Finnmark" (2017).

== In popular culture ==
- The instrumental song Closing the Circle by Danish progressive metal band Beyond Twilight (on their 2001 album The Devil's Hall of Fame) contains melody snippets taken from Til Ungdommen.
- The song Songen Åt Fangen by Norwegian black metal band Vreid (on their debut album Kraft) uses Til Ungdommen as its primary melody.

== Other sources ==
- Andreassen, Jostein (1992) Nordahl Grieg på Sørlandet: Et studieheft om forfatterskap og miljø (J. Andreassen) ISBN 978-82-91188-01-0
- Nag, Martin (1989) Ung må Nordahl Grieg ennå være (Solum) ISBN 978-82-560-0655-7
- Hoem, Edvard (1989) Til ungdommen : Nordahl Griegs liv (Oslo: Gyldendal) ISBN 82-05-29946-3
