= Willy Brandt Prize =

Award from the Norwegian-German Willi-Brand-foundation

The Willy Brandt Prize is an annual prize awarded by the Norwegian-German Willy Brandt prize foundation (in German: Norwegisch-Deutsche Willy-Brandt-Stiftung) since 2000. It is awarded to persons or institutions that make significant contributions to German-Norwegian relations. It is named after the former German Bundeskanzler Willy Brandt and comprises a Willy Brandt statuette by Nils Aas and a certificate. It is separate from the International Willy-Brandt Prize founded in 2011 by the Social Democratic Party of Germany.

== Prize winners ==
=== 2024 ===
- Asbjørn Svarstad, journalist
- Franz Thönnes, politician

=== 2018 ===
- Robin Allers
- Kate Hansen Bundt

=== 2017 ===
- Ingrid Brekke
- sailing ship Thor Heyerdahl e.V.

=== 2016 ===
- Jon Fosse
- Julia Stöber

=== 2015 ===
- Sten Inge Jørgensen, Norwegian journalist writing for Morgenbladet and author of the book "Tyskland stiger frem"
- Clemens Bomsdorf, German journalist writing for Focus, The Art Newspaper, art – Das Kunstmagazin

=== 2014 ===
- Jan Garbarek, Norwegian Saxophonist
- Edvard-Munch-Haus e.V.

=== 2013 ===
- Jonas Gahr Støre, former Norwegian Foreign Minister
- Frank-Walter Steinmeier, former German Foreign Minister

=== 2012 ===
- Ingvar Ambjørnsen, Norwegian writer
- Action Reconciliation Service for Peace, a German organisation

=== 2011 ===
- Therese Bjørneboe, Norwegian journalist
- Jörn Thiede, German polar scientist

=== 2010 ===
- Sverre Dahl, Norwegian translator
- Klaus-Ewald Holst, Honorary Consul General for Norway in Sachsen-Anhalt, Thüringen and Brandenburg

=== 2009 ===
- Inge Lønning, Norwegian professor and politician
- Fritz Fadranski, German historian

=== 2008 ===
- Grete Lächert, Music teacher
- Hannelore Besser, School principal

=== 2007 ===
- Egon Bahr, German politician
- Thorvald Stoltenberg, former Norwegian Foreign Minister

=== 2006 ===
- Gymnasium Carolinum (Neustrelitz), Neustrelitz, a German academic school
- Stor-Elvdal ungdomsskole, Koppang, a Norwegian academy
- Herzog-Johann-Gymnasium in Simmern, Hunsrück, a German academic school

=== 2005 ===
- Björn Engholm (German), former Minister-President for Schleswig-Holstein
- Kåre Willoch (Norwegian), former Prime Minister of Norway

=== 2004 ===
- Jostein Gaarder, Norwegian writer
- Heiko Uecker, German professor

=== 2003 ===
- Nils Morten Udgaard, Norwegian journalist
- Einhard Lorenz, German historian

=== 2002 ===
- Wencke Myhre, Norwegian singer
- Horst Tappert, German actor

=== 2001 ===
- Klaus Liesen, former Director-General of Ruhrgas AG
- Olav Christopher Jensen, German-Norwegian visual artist

=== 2000 ===
- Jahn Otto Johansen, journalist
- Gabriele Haefs, translator for the book Sofies Welt (English: Sophie's World)
