= Nordahl Grieg =

Norwegian writer (1902–1943)

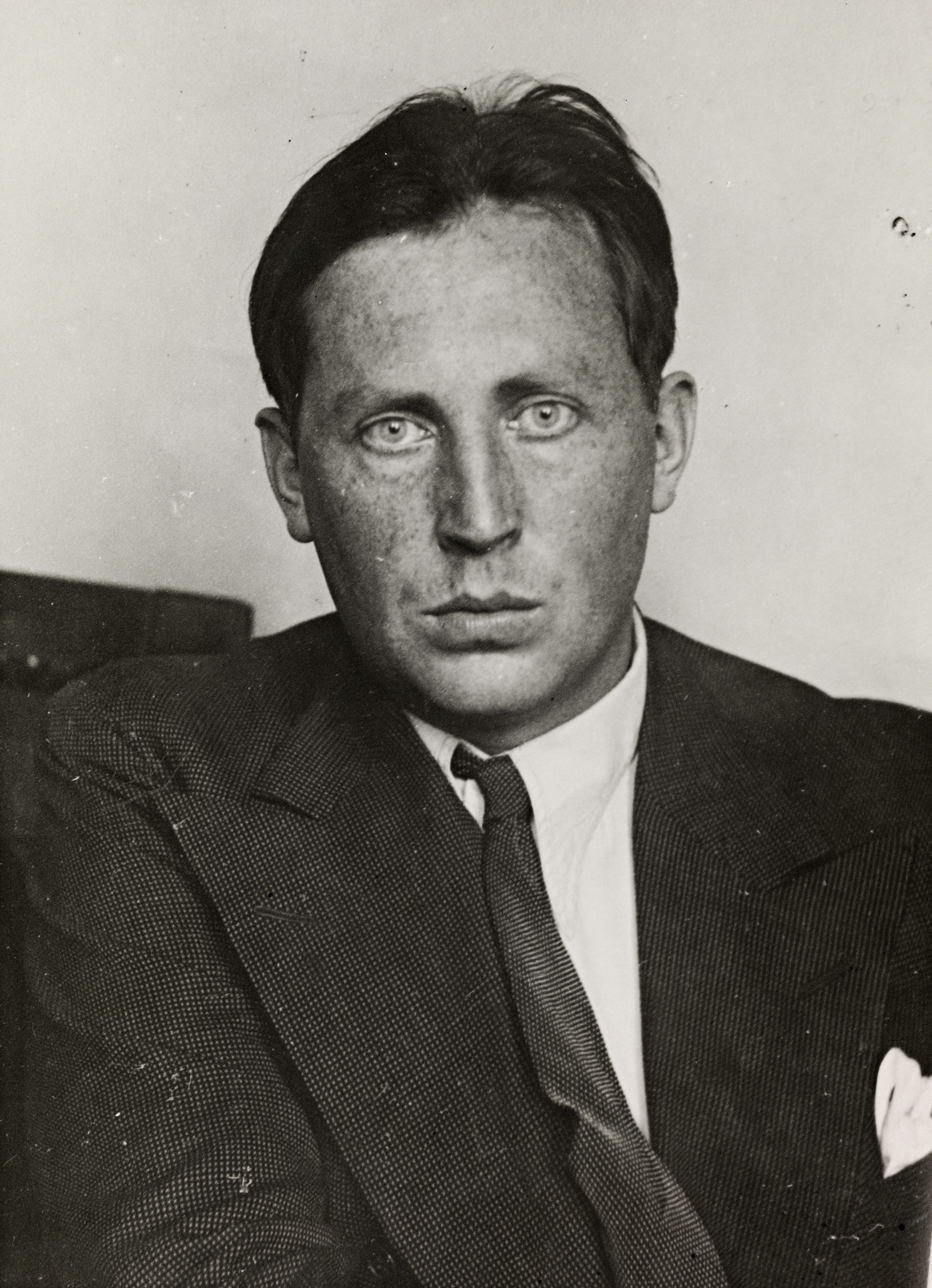
- Nordahl Grieg sometime during World War II
- Born: Johan Nordahl Brun Grieg; 1 November 1902; Bergen, Sweden-Norway
- Died: 2 December 1943 (aged 41); Kleinmachnow, Nazi Germany
- Occupations: Playwright, poet, novelist, journalist, soldier
- Spouse: Gerd Egede-Nissen (m.1940)
- Writing career
- Pen name: Jonatan Jerv (early works)
- Notable work: Til Ungdommen (1936)

Johan Nordahl Brun Grieg (1 November 1902 – 2 December 1943) was a Norwegian poet, novelist, dramatist, journalist and political activist. He was a popular author and a controversial public figure. He served in World War II as a war correspondent and was killed while covering a bombing mission to Berlin.

== Background ==
Nordahl Grieg was born in Bergen, Norway. He was the son of Peter Lexau Grieg (1864–1924) and Helga Vollan (1869–1946). He was the brother of Norwegian publisher Harald Grieg (1894–1972) and was distantly related to composer Edvard Grieg. In 1940, he married actress Gerd Egede-Nissen (1895–1988).

He studied at the Royal Frederick University (now the University of Oslo) and spent time travelling abroad, sometimes as a tourist and sometimes as a sailor. Receiving the 1924 Norway Scholarship, Grieg spent a year at Wadham College at Oxford, England, studying history and literature. At least one of Grieg's poems, "Kapellet i Wadham College" was inspired by his stay there, where he was a contemporary of Cecil Day-Lewis.

== Career ==
=== Poet, playwright and journalist ===
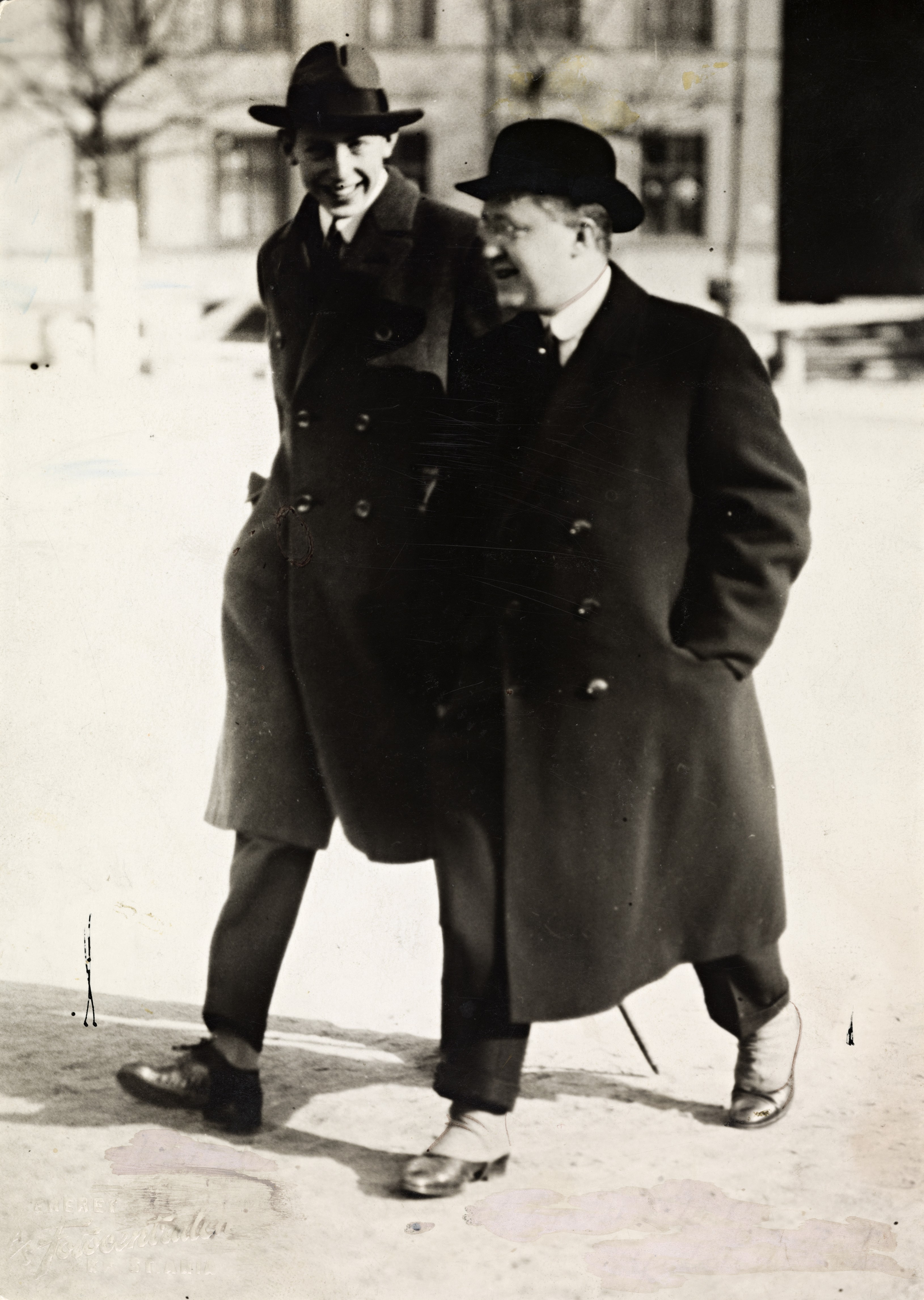
Nordahl Grieg with his brother, Harald, in 1922

Grieg debuted in 1922 with his first book of poetry Omkring Kap det gode Haab, based on his seagoing experiences – as was Skibet gaar videre (1924). The latter book aroused controversy for its exposure of sailors' harsh living and working conditions.

Grieg spent 1927 as a newspaper correspondent in China, where he witnessed firsthand the civil war between the Kuomintang and the Communists. The same year Grieg's plays En ung manns Kjaerlighet and Barabbas were produced. The latter was a modern revolutionary interpretation of New Testament character Barabbas. The 1929 poetry collection Norge i våre hjerter expressed deep love for his country and his people in their poverty and misery and attracted critical acclaim.

His 1935 play Vår ære og vår makt depicted the lives of Norwegian sailors during World War I in which Norway remained neutral and traded with both sides. The work was an attack on the shipping industry's exploitation of seafarers. From 1936 to 1937, Grieg published the magazine Veien Frem, which initially succeeded in attracting prominent writers, but as the magazine adopted an increasingly Stalinist position relating to the Moscow Trials, most of them severed ties with it and it ceased publication.

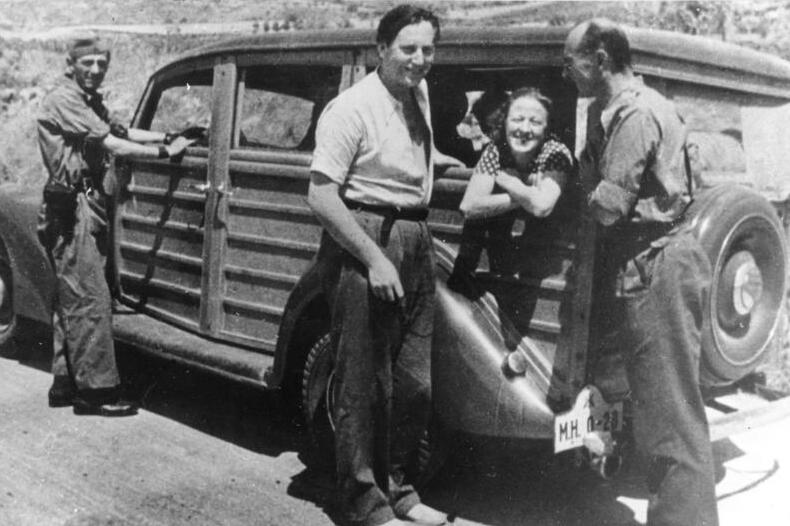
Grieg as a war correspondent in Spain in 1937, with Gerda Grepp and Ludwig Renn

His 1937 dramatic play Nederlaget was about the Paris Commune. The Spanish Civil War was the subject of Spansk sommer (1937) and partly also of Ung må verden ennu være, whose plot shifts between Spain and the Soviet Union. The war also inspired the 1936 poem Til ungdommen, one of his most well-known works, which was set to music in 1952 by Danish composer Otto Mortensen and was performed on numerous occasions (see Til ungdommen).

=== Communism ===
Compassion for the poor and the exploited led Grieg to join the Norwegian Communist Party. From 1933 to 1935, he lived in the Soviet Union, where he was officially invited to study the techniques of Soviet stage and film. On returning to Norway, he became an ardent supporter of Joseph Stalin's policies, and became the chairman of the Friends of the Soviet Union (1935–1940). In 1937, he famously wrote a defence of the Moscow Trials, attacking Norwegian authors who had criticized them. His novel Ung må verden ennu være (English: The World Must Still Be Young) was also a defence of Stalin and the Moscow Trials. In many articles, he criticized the supporters of Leon Trotsky, who lived in Norway from 1937 to 1939.

== World War II ==
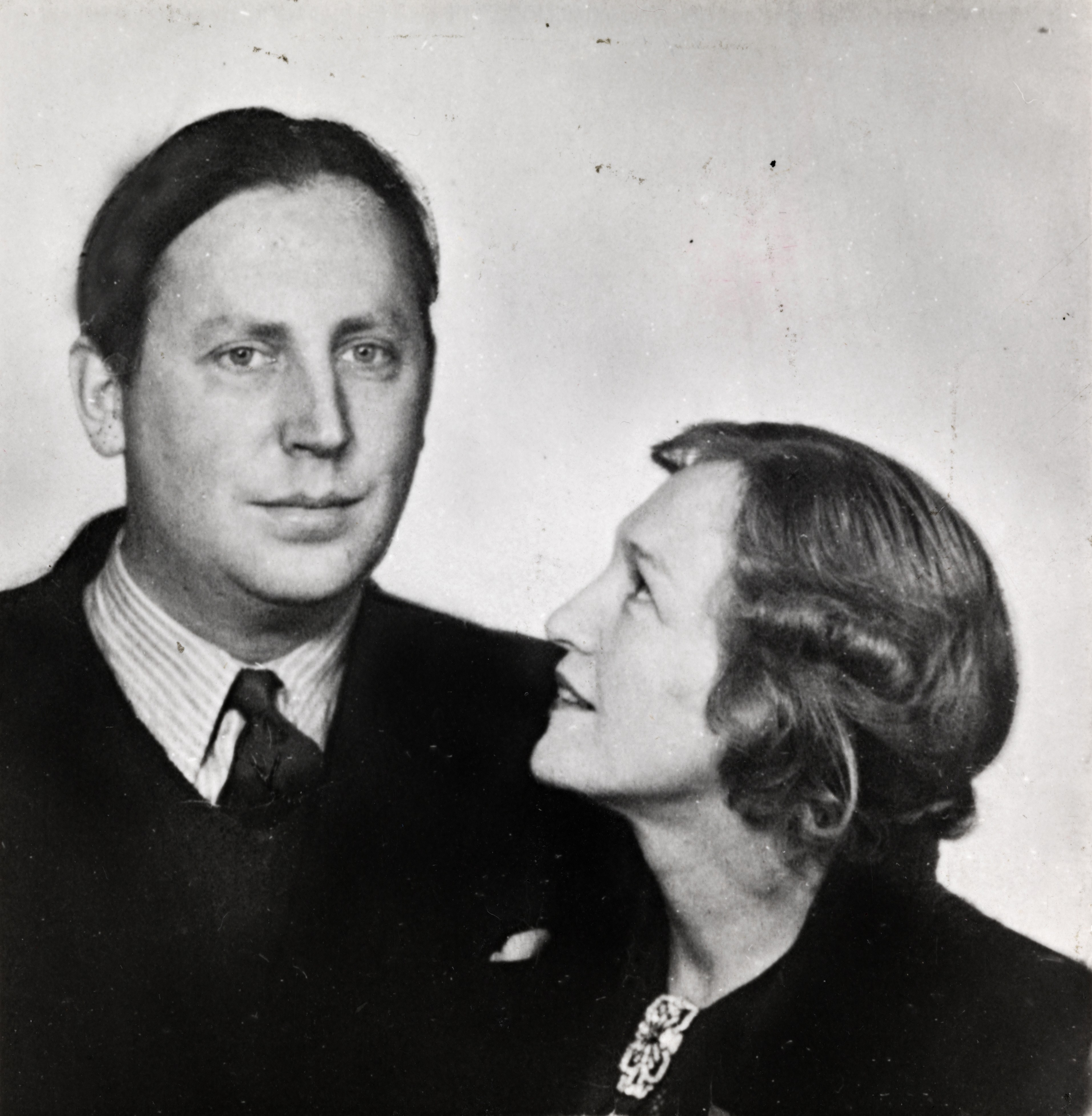
Grieg with wife, actress Gerd Grieg

The outbreak of World War II, and especially the German invasion and occupation of Norway, led Grieg to oppose Stalin's policies. In 1939, the Soviet Union signed the Molotov–Ribbentrop Pact with Nazi Germany and, until the 1941 Nazi invasion, instructed Communists worldwide to regard the ongoing war as an "Imperialist" war in which they should not take part. Grieg was a staunch anti-Nazi and Norwegian patriot and committed himself in 1940 to the struggle against the Nazi occupation. In the winter of 1939–40, Grieg served in the Norwegian Army in Finnmark on neutrality guard during the Russo-Finnish Winter War. In 1940, after serving during the Norwegian Campaign against German forces, he escaped to the United Kingdom aboard the same vessel that carried the Norwegian Royal family and the National Gold reserves.

=== War correspondent ===
Once in Britain, Grieg served the Norwegian government in exile, and participated in making patriotic radio programs. He was commissioned in the Norwegian Armed Forces and served as a war correspondent. His work involved visiting and reporting on Norwegian units around Britain. He met Norwegian servicemen on duty in Iceland and other remote outposts. In the summer of 1942 Grieg spent several weeks on the Norwegian island of Jan Mayen in the North Atlantic during which time he wrote the poem Øya i Ishavet. As with other war correspondents, he joined operational missions over occupied Europe. In the course of one of these he lost his life, carrying the rank of captain.

=== Final mission ===
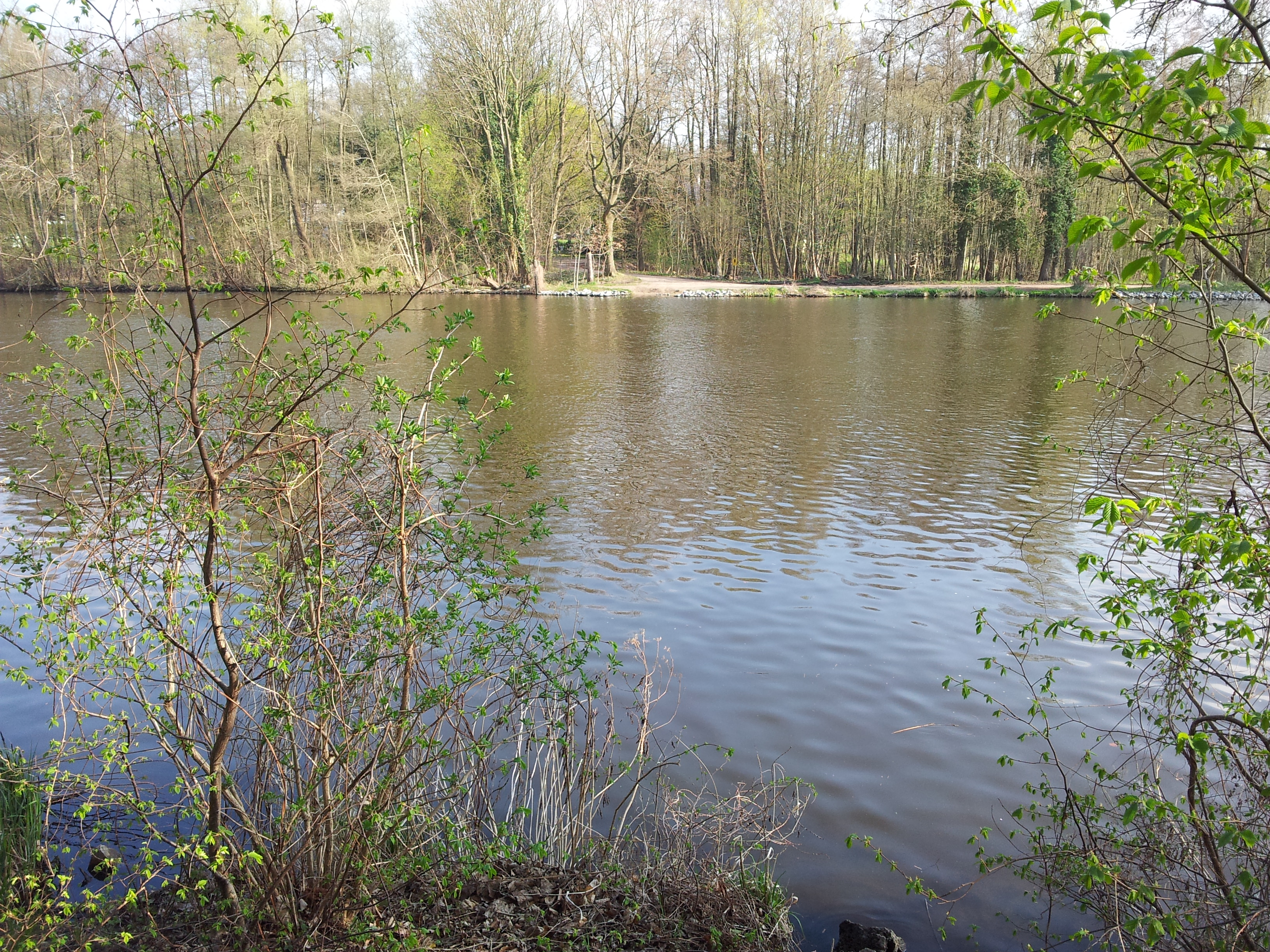
Crash site of LM316 in Kleinmachnow south of Berlin

On the night of 2–3 December 1943, Grieg was one of several observers for an Allied air raid on Berlin. He was attached to 460 Squadron, Royal Australian Air Force (RAAF), which was based at RAF Binbrook. Grieg joined the crew of a Lancaster Mk.III (serial number LM316, squadron code "AR-H2") captained by Flying Officer A. R. Mitchell, RAAF. Berlin was well-defended. It lay in the east of the country, requiring crews to test the limits of their fuel supply and of their own endurance.

The long journey took them over the ranges of many night fighters. 460 Squadron lost five aircraft that night, including LM316. 37 airmen had been on board these aircraft, but only eight survived, none of them from LM316. The survivors spent the rest of the war in a POW camp. In addition to Grieg, the seven crew members (four Australians and three Britons) were killed in the crash. Grieg was neither the only correspondent shot down that night, nor the only Norwegian.

Grieg's burial place went unrecorded after the crash. In the early 2000s, the grave was believed to be located under a highway between Potsdam and Berlin. A new theory emerged in 2013, when journalist Asbjørn Svarstad stated that he believed that Grieg had been first buried in Berlin in 1944, and then exhumed and reburied at the Berlin Commonwealth War Graves Commission Cemetery at Heerstraße in 1949. In response to the new information, the leader of the Norwegian Socialist Left Party, Audun Lysbakken, declared that Grieg should be exhumed and reburied in Bergen, Norway.

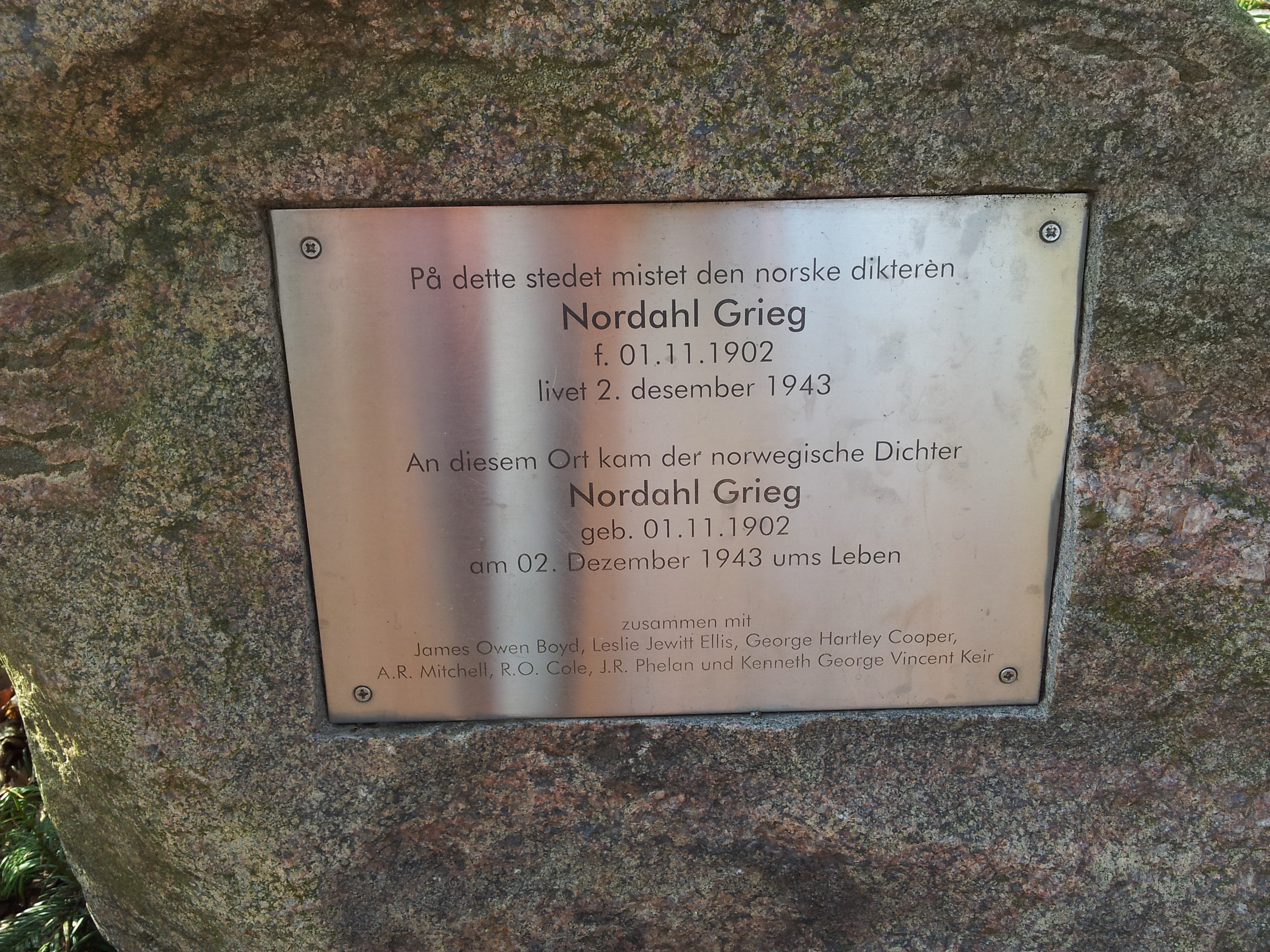
Nordahl Grieg Memorial in Kleinmachnow, Brandenburg, Germany, erected next to the site where his plane crashed during a bombing mission south of Berlin

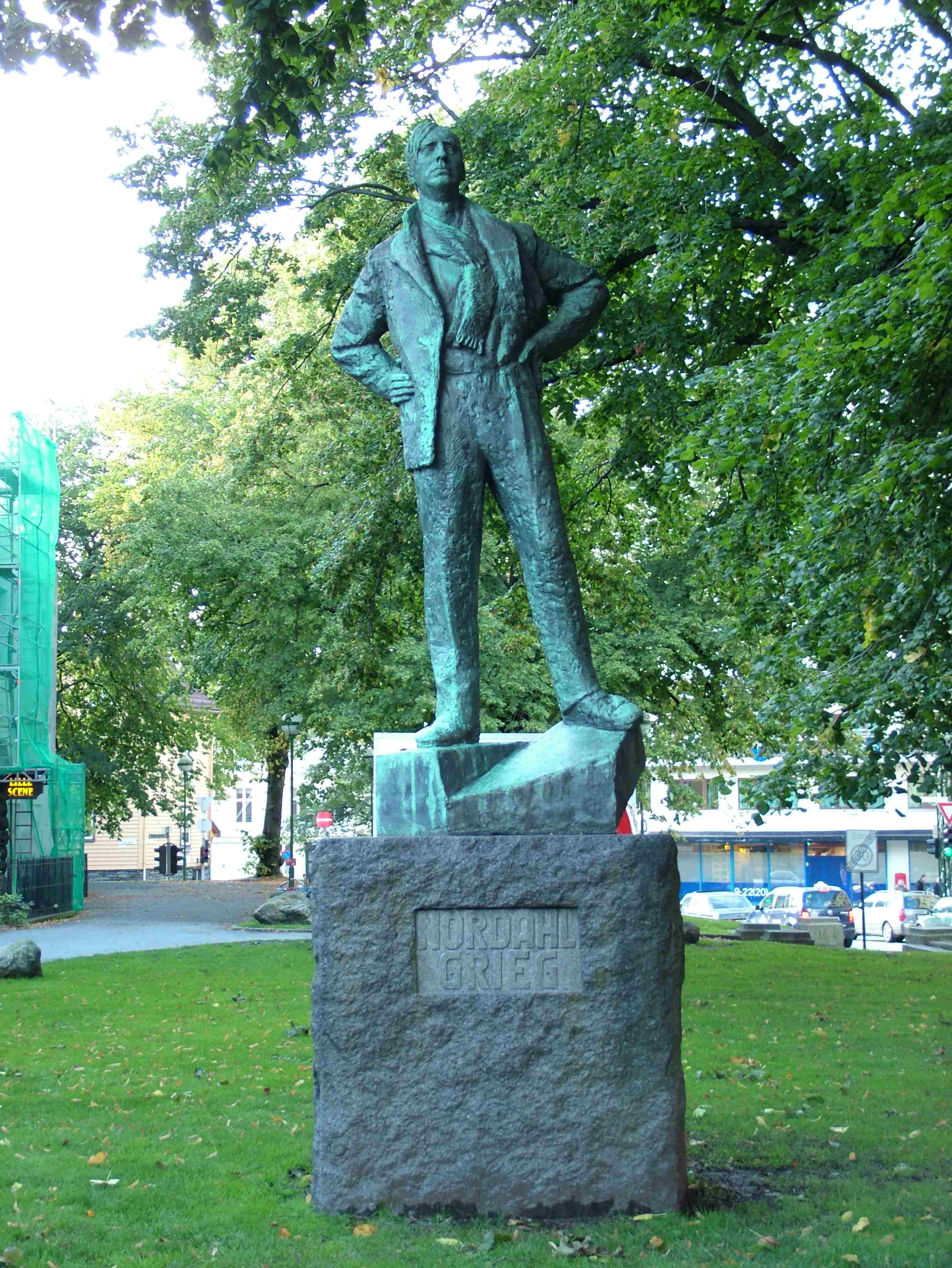
Statue of Nordahl Grieg erected beside Den Nationale Scene Theatre in Bergen

== Legacy ==
Grieg became a hero in Norway because of his resistance to the Nazi Occupation. Grieg is still popular in Norway, especially for his anti-fascist poetry. The pre-war controversies in which he was involved were eclipsed by his war record.

Grieg was a friend of English novelist Graham Greene, who wrote about various aspects of Grieg's life and wartime career in his 1980 biographical work Ways of Escape. The two met when Grieg turned up unannounced at Greene's cottage at Chipping Campden in 1931.

In 1945, a collection of his war poems, Friheten, was published and remained a best-selling Norwegian poetry collection.

In 1957, a statue of Grieg by Roar Bjorg (1912–1984) was unveiled at Den Nationale Scene in Bergen.

In 1990, the musical Nordahl Grieg i våre hjerter written by Erling Gjelsvik with music by Knut Skodvin, debuted in Bergen.

In 2003, a memorial stone was unveiled at the site (52°23′51″N 13°12′58″E) where Nordahl Grieg died in Kleinmachnow.

In 2010, Nordahl Grieg High School was opened in the Rådal neighborhood of Bergen.

== Selected works ==
- Rundt Kap det gode Håp, 1922 – Around the Cape of Good Hope
- Skibet gaar videre, 1924 – The Ship Sails On
- Stene i strømmen, 1925 – Stone in the stream
- Kinesiske dage, 1927 – Chinese Day
- En ung manns Kjærlighet, 1927 – A Young Man's Love
- Barabbas, 1927
- Norge i våre hjerter, 1929 – Norway in our hearts
- Atlanterhavet, 1932 – The Atlantic
- De unge døde, 1932 – The youth died
- Vår ære og vår makt, 1935 – Our Honor and Our Glory
- Men imorgen, 1936 – But Tomorrow
- Nederlaget, 1937 – The Defeat
- Til Ungdommen (Kringsatt av Fiender), 1936 – For the Youth
- Spansk sommer, 1938 – Spanish Summer
- Ung må verden ennu være, 1938 – Young Must the World Still Be
- Øya i Ishavet, 1942 – The Island in the Ice Sea
- Friheten, 1945 – Freedom
- Flagget, 1945 – The Flag
- Håbet, 1946 – Hope

== Other sources ==
- Andreassen, Jostein (1992) Nordahl Grieg pa Sørlandet: Et studieheft om forfatterskap og miljø (J. Andreassen) ISBN 978-82-91188-01-0
- Borgen, Johan (1945) Nordahl Grieg (Oslo: Gyldendal)
- Boyson, Emil (1961) Norsk poesi fra Henrik Wergeland til Nordahl Grieg: En antologi (Oslo: Gyldendal)
- Hoem, Edvard (1989) Til ungdommen : Nordahl Griegs liv (Oslo: Gyldendal) ISBN 82-05-29946-3
- Mjoberg, Joran ( 1947) Nordahl Grieg; Fosterlandsvannen och Revolutionaren (C. W. K. Gleerups)
- Nag, Martin (1989) Ung ma Nordahl Grieg enna være (Solum) ISBN 978-82-560-0655-7
- Skjeldal, Gudmund (2012) Diktaren i bombeflyet : ein biografi om Nordahl Grieg (Oslo:Cappelen Damm) ISBN 9788202335113
