= Scholz cabinet =

Government of Germany from 2021 to 2025

- 24th Cabinet of the Federal Republic of Germany
- 8 December 2021 – 25 March 2025 (until 6 May 2025 as caretaker government)
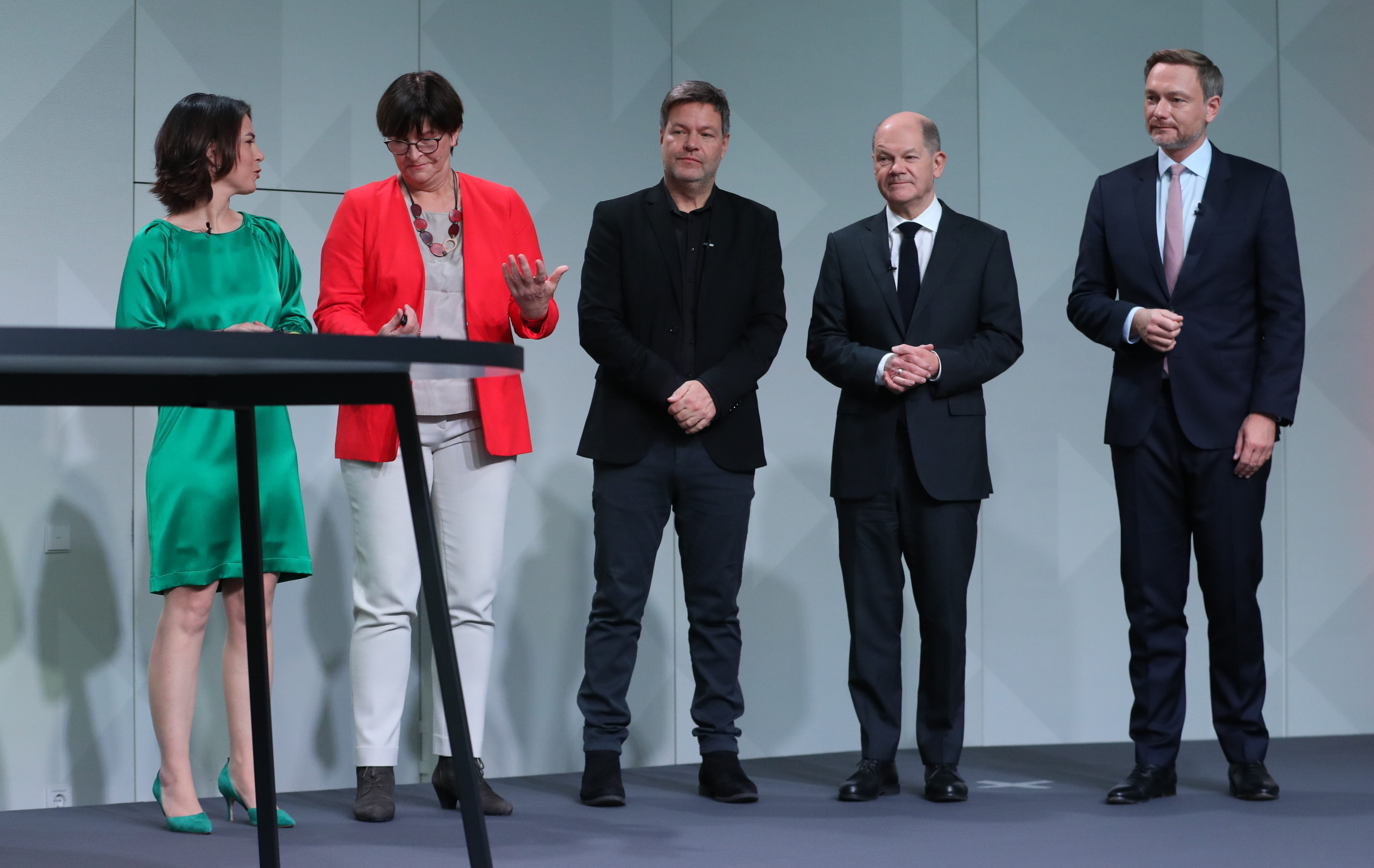
- Signing of the coalition agreement for the 20st Bundestag on 7 December 2021
- Date formed: 8 December 2021
- Date dissolved: 6 May 2025 (3 years, 4 months and 4 weeks)

People and organisations
- President: Frank-Walter Steinmeier
- Chancellor: Olaf Scholz
- Vice Chancellor: Robert Habeck
- Member parties: Social Democratic Party; Alliance 90/The Greens; Free Democratic Party (2021–2024); Independent (Volker Wissing, 2024–2025)
- Status in legislature: Traffic light coalition (Majority) (2021–2024); Red–green coalition (Minority) (2024–2025)
- Opposition parties: Christian Democratic Union; Christian Social Union; Free Democratic Party (from 2024); Alternative for Germany; The Left; Sahra Wagenknecht Alliance (from 2024); South Schleswig Voters' Association; Centre (2022-2022); Alliance Germany (from 2024); Values Union (from 2025)
- Opposition leader: Ralph Brinkhaus (CDU) (2021–2022); Friedrich Merz (CDU) (2022–2025)

History
- Election: 2021 federal election
- Legislature terms: 20th Bundestag
- Predecessor: Merkel IV
- Successor: Merz

The Scholz cabinet (German: Kabinett Scholz, pronounced [kabiˈnɛt ʃɔlt͡s]) was the 24th government of the Federal Republic of Germany during the 20th legislative session of the Bundestag. It was sworn in on 8 December 2021 following the 2021 federal election and dismissed on 25 March 2025, and acted in a caretaker role until 6 May 2025. It was preceded by the Fourth Merkel cabinet and succeeded by the Merz cabinet. It was led by Federal Chancellor Olaf Scholz and the cabinet ultimately composed of Scholz's Social Democratic Party (SPD) and Alliance 90/The Greens.

The Free Democratic Party (FDP) was a member of the cabinet until 7 November 2024, when the three-way coalition collapsed through Scholz's dismissal of FDP finance minister Christian Lindner. Scholz announced pursuing a snap election to be held in early 2025. On 16 December 2024, Scholz lost a vote of no confidence. On the same day, he requested the President of Germany to dissolve the Bundestag. President Frank-Walter Steinmeier granted the request and called new elections for 23 February 2025.

The coalition of SPD, Greens and FDP was an arrangement known as a "traffic light coalition" in German politics after the parties' traditional colours, respectively red, green and yellow, matching the colours of a traffic light (Ampel). This traffic light coalition-government was the first of its kind at the federal level in the history of the German federal republic.

In 2023, a mid-term review of the coalition agreement's implementation found that compared to the preceding grand coalition (Merkel IV), the traffic light government had achieved 38 instead of 53 per cent of its coalition promises, which is proportionally less, but with 174 instead of 154 fulfilled promises; it had actually achieved somewhat more in absolute terms. This applies to the government's major reform projects as well as to smaller government projects.

== Coalition formation ==
Following the 2021 German federal election, the three parties reached a coalition agreement on 24 November 2021. The SPD approved the coalition agreement by 98.8% (598 yes-votes to 7 no-votes and 3 abstentions) at the party's federal convention on 4 December 2021. The FDP approved the coalition agreement by 92.24% (535 yes-votes to 37 no-votes and 8 abstentions) at the party's federal convention on 5 December 2021. The Greens approved the agreement via a party-wide referendum, the results of which were declared on 6 December to be 85.96% (61,174 yes-votes to 8,275 no-votes and 1,701 abstentions).

The opposition Christian Democrats can veto important laws (Zustimmungsgesetze) via their Bundesrat seats. They thus form a de facto fourth power in the coalition. The traffic light coalition has therefore been likened to a "Zimbabwe coalition", according to Zimbabwe's flag (red, green, and yellow, plus black for the Christian Democrats). The Christian Democrats used their veto, for example, to preserve sanctions in Germany's unemployment benefit reform (Bürgergeld) and to prevent the federal voting age from being lowered to 16.

Scholz was elected as Chancellor by the Bundestag on 8 December 2021. His cabinet, as determined by the coalition agreement, was formally appointed by President Frank-Walter Steinmeier on the same day.

== 2024 crisis ==
Due to the sharp policy disagreement over the economic crisis, Scholz announced the dismissal of FDP leader Christian Lindner as Federal Minister of Finance on 6 November 2024, triggering the collapse of the coalition, and making a snap election likely to be held earlier in 2025.

On 16 December 2024, Scholz lost a vote of confidence. As a result, an early 2025 federal election was held on 23 February 2025.

== Composition ==
The cabinet consists of Chancellor Olaf Scholz and sixteen federal ministers. Until November 2024 SPD held eight positions, the Greens five and the FDP four. From then on, the SPD held nine positions and the Greens six, while two portfolios were held by a non-partisan minister.

Order	Office	Portrait	Minister	Party	Took office	Left office
1	Chancellor		Olaf Scholz	SPD	8 December 2021	6 May 2025
2	Vice Chancellor		Robert Habeck	Greens	8 December 2021	6 May 2025
2	Federal Minister for Economic Affairs and Climate Action		Robert Habeck	Greens	8 December 2021	6 May 2025
3	Federal Minister of Finance		Christian Lindner	FDP	8 December 2021	7 November 2024 (dismissed)
3	Federal Minister of Finance		Jörg Kukies	SPD	7 November 2024	6 May 2025
4	Federal Minister of the Interior and Community		Nancy Faeser	SPD	8 December 2021	6 May 2025
5	Federal Minister for Foreign Affairs		Annalena Baerbock	Greens	8 December 2021	6 May 2025
6	Federal Minister of Justice		Marco Buschmann	FDP	8 December 2021	7 November 2024 (resigned)
6	Federal Minister of Justice		Volker Wissing	Ind	7 November 2024	6 May 2025
7	Federal Minister of Labour and Social Affairs		Hubertus Heil	SPD	14 March 2018	6 May 2025
8	Federal Minister of Defence		Christine Lambrecht	SPD	8 December 2021	19 January 2023
8	Federal Minister of Defence		Boris Pistorius	SPD	19 January 2023	Incumbent (in Merz Cabinet)
9	Federal Minister of Food and Agriculture		Cem Özdemir	Greens	8 December 2021	6 May 2025
10	Federal Minister for Family Affairs, Senior Citizens, Women and Youth		Anne Spiegel	Greens	8 December 2021	25 April 2022
10	Federal Minister for Family Affairs, Senior Citizens, Women and Youth		Lisa Paus	Greens	25 April 2022	6 May 2025
11	Federal Minister of Health		Karl Lauterbach	SPD	8 December 2021	6 May 2025
12	Federal Minister of Digital and Transport		Volker Wissing	FDP (until 2024)	8 December 2021	6 May 2025
12	Federal Minister of Digital and Transport		Volker Wissing	Ind (since 2024)	8 December 2021	6 May 2025
13	Federal Minister for the Environment, Nature Conservation, Nuclear Safety and Consumer Protection		Steffi Lemke	Greens	8 December 2021	6 May 2025
14	Federal Minister of Education and Research		Bettina Stark-Watzinger	FDP	8 December 2021	7 November 2024 (resigned)
14	Federal Minister of Education and Research		Cem Özdemir	Greens	7 November 2024	6 May 2025
15	Federal Minister for Economic Cooperation and Development		Svenja Schulze	SPD	8 December 2021	6 May 2025
16	Federal Minister for Housing, Urban Development and Building		Klara Geywitz	SPD	8 December 2021	6 May 2025
17	Federal Minister for Special Affairs & Head of the Chancellery		Wolfgang Schmidt	SPD	8 December 2021	6 May 2025

== Policy ==
Project	Scope	Stage
BAföG expansion		In force
Housing benefits threshold lowering		In force
49-Euro-Ticket	Ticket to ride regional transport in all of Germany	Started sale 1 May 2023
Long-term care expansion and payroll tax increase	Tax increase from 1.7% to 2.4% of income	In force since 1 July 2023
Abolition of § 219a	Allowing medics to inform about abortion services they provide	In force 19 July 2022
Animal Husbandry Labelling	Pig meat that is both produced and sold in Germany	In force 24 August 2023
Cannabis legalisation	For personal use	In force 1 April 2024

=== Economy and energy ===
Following Russia's invasion of Ukraine in February 2022, the Scholz government passed a gas rationing law, under the leadership of economy minister Robert Habeck (Greens). In August 2022, a major expansion of the BAföG system of government grants and loans for students and trainees was introduced, fulfilling a key FDP government program plank. The largest housing benefits reform since 1965 will come into effect on January 1, 2023, with the number of households entitled to receive the benefits increasing from 600,000 in 2022 to over 2 million in 2023, and the allowances for heating and cooling more than doubling. The Traffic Light coalition also agreed on a major €200-billion energy relief package in October 2022, to come into effect starting in January 2023 and running through mid-2024. The government announced a gas price capping scheme called Gaspreisbremse for 2023.

In response to alleged price-gouging and excess profits during the energy and inflation crisis of 2022–2023, the federal government expanded the powers of the Federal Cartel Office in July 2023. The FCO was granted the ability to take action if there was a significant disruption in market competition, irrespective of a specific breach in antitrust law. Also the requirement that the FCO identify the size of the benefit obtained by a company for violating antitrust law before being able to fine the firm's excess profits was removed.

=== Labour ===
In August 2022, the Bundestag implemented Amendments to the Proof Act (Nachweisgesetz or NachwG), which implemented the EU Directive on Working Conditions. The amendments obligate employers to provide detailed information about working conditions to their employees, and employment contracts must explicitly state employment terms, conditions, and benefits.

In October 2022, the minimum wage was increased to €12 per hour, fulfilling a key SPD election campaign promise. In November, the Scholz government introduced the Bürgergeld (lit. 'Citizens Money'), a long-term unemployment benefits reform to replace Hartz IV. Hartz IV was the unemployment benefits system implemented under SPD Chancellor Gerhard Schröder in 2003 as part of the Agenda 2010 reform package; since 2018, the SPD has disowned the Hartz reforms and sought a new system that increases unemployment benefits and is less punitive towards the long-term unemployed, which the Bürgergeld system accomplishes. The reform also sought to address the skills gap in Germany, with Bürgergeld recipients being entitled to additional money during vocational training. The new system came into effect in January 2023, after reaching a compromise with the opposition CDU/CSU in the Bundesrat.

=== Transport ===
In its first year, the Scholz government introduced the 9-Euro-Ticket in summer 2022. The transport ministry, led by Volker Wissing (Free Democrats), failed to prepare an adequate plan to meet emissions reduction targets in the transport sector in summer 2022. However, in October 2022, the federal government and the states agreed to implement a nationwide 49 Euro per month public transport ticket, which will apply to all local and regional transit across the country and eliminate the previous maze of tariff zones starting in 2023. The 49-Euro ticket came into effect on May 1st, 2023.

=== Healthcare and long-term care policy ===
In February 2022, Federal Health Minister Karl Lauterbach (SPD) announced a €1-billion special fund to pay tax-free bonuses to eldercare and hospital staff who worked during the COVID-19 pandemic. €500 million are earmarked for hospital staff and the other €500M are for eldercare staff. Under Lauterbach, the vaccination ratio stagnated at 75% (as of August 2022).

In June 2023, a major expansion of the long-term care was implemented. The reform increased allowances for at-home caregivers to between €332–946 per month and introduced a new annual flexible budget for caregivers. To fund the estimated costs of €6.6B per year, the payroll tax for long-term care was increased from 1.7% to 2.4% in a graduated scale based upon the number of children an employee has.

=== Social policy ===
In June 2022, the SPD, Greens, FDP, and Die Linke voted to repeal Paragraph Section 219a of the Criminal Code, which outlawed the so-called "advertisement" of abortion services (a legal term). The paragraph had prohibited doctors from specifying online which kinds of abortion services they provide, and under what circumstances.

In June 2023, new amendments strengthening hate crime legislation in the Criminal Code regarding sexual orientation and gender-specific crimes were introduced by Justice Minister Marco Buschmann and ratified by the Bundestag:

- Harsher penalties for femicide, and new rules taking into account motives stemming from patriarchal claims of ownership and misogyny.
- Expansion of rehabilitation-focused treatment for those in need of treatment and willing to be treated. New focus on keeping violent offenders from using rehab centers as a way of getting out of stricter punishment, with the goal of taking pressure off of the rehab centers, and preventing dangerous addicted offenders from being released due to lack of treatment places.
- Reform of substitute prison sentences for unpaid fines to take pressure off the prison system. Determination of fines incorporating socioeconomic status (e.g. income, poverty, unemployment, homelessness or mental illness) and ability for fines to be paid in installments or substituted for unpaid community work.

In 2024, the government introduced gender self-identification, allowing individuals to change their legal name and gender at a registry office without the need for medical evidence or legal approval.

=== Refugees and asylum policy ===
In 2022, more than 1.4 million refugees from Ukraine arrived in Germany, in addition to 244,000 asylum applications being filed. In 2022, over €28B were spent on refugees and asylum seekers by the federal government; €15B were given as aid to states and municipalities, while €13B were spent as foreign aid. In the first four months of 2023, more than 101,000 asylum applications were filed, and the Federal Office for Migration and Refugees estimated that asylum applications could exceed 300,000 in 2023.

Municipal and state governments complained about strained budgets and accommodations, and demanded more support from the federal government. After a contentious summit between the states and federal government in May 2023, a reform of the asylum system was agreed to: €1B in upfront emergency aid was provided to the states, modernization of IT systems to speed up application processing and tracking, renewed focus on deportations of rejected asylum seekers, and an increase in the number of days that rejected asylum seekers can be placed in preventative detention for from 10 days to 28 days. The federal government rejected demands for an automatic, flat-rate €1,000 payment per refugee to municipalities, as well as rejecting new border controls. However, Scholz agreed to hold another summit in November 2023, when the results of the proposed Common European Asylum System will be announced. The German government says it supports the EU-wide proposal for asylum processing centers outside of European Union's borders.

In 2022, Germany witnessed a 70% increase in attacks on refugee/asylum centers compared to 2021. According to ARD-DeutschlandTREND, 77% of Germans believe the federal government does not place enough importance on the problems created by migrants, and ARD-InfratestDimap shows that the issue of refugees and asylum seekers has jumped to the third most important issue amongst German voters, with 19% of respondents citing the issue as most important (climate change was rated as most important by 26%, followed by the Russian invasion of Ukraine at 25%). The renewed refugee and asylum wave coincided with a surge in support for the far-right Alternative for Germany party.

=== Immigration and citizenship reform ===
In June 2023, the government overhauled Germany's immigration system. The new Skilled Workers' Act (Fachkräfteeinwanderungsgesetz) aims to greatly liberalize Germany's immigration rules for skilled and educated workers, and implements a points-based immigration system modeled upon Canada's immigration laws. The law also provides for faster processing of applications, faster and easier recognition of foreign degrees and work experience, introduces a new job seeker visa, lowers the minimum salary for EU Blue Card (from an annual pre-tax salary of €58,400 to €43,800), makes it easier to change industries, introduces a new family reunification visa, and allows refugees/asylum seekers who entered before March 2023 to enter vocational training if qualified. The law was passed in July 2023.

- Jobs must either meet a minimum salary threshold or be subject to a collective agreement before the Federal Employment Agency approves the visa application.
- The new points system takes into account qualifications, German language skills, previous professional experience, previous stays in Germany, age of the applicant, and the number of dependents coming with the applicant.
- Graduates from German universities/apprenticeships will automatically receive a 1-year "opportunity card" visa that allows them to stay in the country past their graduation date and enables part-time and trial work while looking for full-time work.
- Sectors deemed to have acute labor shortages will receive special attention for applications and processing, so long as the job offers are subject to fair pay, collective bargaining contracts, and compulsory social insurance coverage.
- The existing Western Balkans Regulations quota for workers will be doubled from 25,000 to 50,000 per year.

Citizenship and naturalization rules were relaxed in 2024, allowing eligible residents to apply for German citizenship after 5 years residence (3 years in exceptional cases), instead of the 8 year requirement previously applied, and allowing dual citizenship in all cases. The same changes were also made for children born to foreign parents with at least 5 years residency, giving them the right to citizenship by birth and also allowing them to inherit their parents' nationality as dual citizens.

=== Defense policy ===
At the formation of the coalition government, plans existed to (further) restrict German arms sales, under Christine Lambrecht as defence minister.

In response to the Russian invasion of Ukraine, Scholz gave the Zeitenwende speech. The Traffic Light coalition joined with the opposition CDU/CSU to pass a special €100B package to finance a re-arming of the Bundeswehr, marking a radical break with the foreign policy of the past 30 years. The funds were to be used to purchase new fighter jets (including the F-35), armed drones, boats, submarines, combat vehicles, and personal equipment. €41B were earmarked for the airforce, €19B for the navy, €17B for the ground forces, and €21B across all branches of the military for new communication technology and to counter the threat of cyberattacks.

Lambrecht was replaced by Boris Pistorius in January 2023 because of her egregious missteps.

Deliveries of the Leopard I tank to Ukraine were approved in March 2023. In July 2023, Scholz announced a long-term support package for the Ukrainian military worth €17B, primarily weapons and lasting through 2027.

Scholz earned copious abuse as he isolated himself over the Taurus KEPD 350 missile in early 2024. In the midst of the debate over whether or not to supply it to Ukraine, the Foreign Intelligence Service (Russia) broadcast what was supposed to be a confidential web conversation between four senior Bundeswehr personnel about it.

As the invasion entered its third year amid evidence of rape by the aggressors who had discarded the Geneva Conventions and calls from senior European politicians to shift to a war-time economy, some Scholz coalition members wanted to move gently.

=== Animal welfare ===
Agriculture minister Cem Özdemir proposed a mandatory Animal Husbandry Label for animal products that are produced in Germany and also destined for sale in Germany.

=== Education and childcare policy ===
In May 2022, a new Kita Quality Act was passed, providing €4B for childcare centers. The law requires that individual states use the funds to improve the quality of childcare and not merely reduce the fees paid by parents. The law also directs more support and attention to so called "language-daycare centers" ("Sprachkita"), which have a specialized focus on accelerated language acquisition and literacy from an early age.

In August 2022, a large expansion of the BAföG student loan and grant system was undertaken, with greater eligibility based upon income and age, as well as direct payments increasing substantially. The reform is considered the first step in a program to expand the system and make support entirely independent of parental income.

In June 2023, a new Continuing Education and Training Act was passed, with the goal of reforming and expanding Germany's apprenticeship system. The law implements an apprenticeship guarantee, expands and simplifies government funding for continuing education/training, introduces new funding (called "qualification money") for workers who are threatened with redundancy due to structural change in their industry, mandates that trainees receive higher pay (equal to 60% of the equivalent full-time salary, or 67% if they have a child), and introduces a new vocational orientation for young people can have a test-period to try out the apprenticeship before actually deciding and starting. Support will be given for those who start training in another region of Germany and will receive a subsidy for two monthly trips back home, and anyone who cannot find an apprenticeship in their region is entitled to external training in a cooperation company and will receive monetary support. Training support in small and medium-sized businesses will be greatly expanded, and the qualification money requires a company-specific or sector-wide collective agreement, where an employer's top-up in addition to the government support can be determined.

=== Electoral law ===
In November 2022, the voting age for elections to the European Parliament was lowered from 18 to 16 via amendments to the European Elections Act.

In March 2023, a controversial new election law was passed with the goal of shrinking the size of the German Bundestag. The New Elections Act permanently fixes the number of elected Bundestag members at 630 (down from 732 after the 2021 federal election) and eliminates overhang and compensation seats. Instead, to maintain proportionality, priority is to be given to the second (party-list) vote over the first (constituency) vote when calculating the apportionment of seats. In practice, this means that candidates who have won a constituency will not be seated if doing so would increase their party's seat share beyond their proportional vote share. Furthermore, the 5% threshold for party-list seats will no longer be exempted for parties that win at least three constituency seats.

The law is seen as a necessary step by the SPD, Greens, and FDP to reduce the size of the parliament, which has progressively expanded in size from 603 seats in 2002 to 732 seats in 2021 due to increased political fragmentation, and creates problems for seating in the Bundestag, since the building is not designed for such large numbers of parliamentarians. The privileging of proportional seats over directly-elected seats is seen by the Christian Social Union as a direct attack on them, as they tend to dominate directly-elected seats in Bavaria, while the implementation of a hard 5% threshold is seen by Die Linke as a direct attack upon them, as in the 2021 federal election, Die Linke received 4.9% of the vote but were still awarded their share of proportional seats due to winning three directly-elected seats.

== Governance ==
In the first year of the Scholz coalition, family minister Anne Spiegel resigned, under pressure for her handling of a 2021 flooding crisis in her former role as Rhineland-Palatinate environment minister. She was replaced by her fellow Green party member Lisa Paus.

Chancellor Scholz was summoned by a panel investigating the Cum Ex affair, for his role in the city of Hamburg's decision not to prosecute a bank that had illicitly gained tax funds.
