= Animal welfare labelling =

Animal Welfare Labelling is intended to provide consumer information on welfare standards applied in the production of food of animal origin.

== Consumer response and trust concerns ==
Welfare products are attracting a growing number of welfare-conscious consumers. However, there is potential for consumers to be misled by false, exaggerated or unsubstantiated statements about the welfare standards observed in the rearing of farm animals. The lack of legal requirements for animal welfare labels in most countries, as well as the multitude of private labels and government-sponsored schemes and the resulting lack of transparency and comparability, make animal welfare labelling vulnerable to abuse.

Initiatives undertaken by the Global Food Safety Initiative issue guidance on the topic. For Europe, the Animal Welfare Strategy 2012-2015 (COM(2012) 6 final of 19 January 2012) provides impetus for further developments.

== Mandatory labels ==
=== European Union codes for egg-laying hens ===
The only mandatory animal welfare label for products sold in the European Union is the egg coding system. To sell eggs in the EU, producers need to print egg mark codes onto them. The code indicates the hens' living conditions (0, 1, 2, or 3). Austria and Germany have banned cage systems (code 3).^{:18}

=== German Animal Husbandry Labelling (2022 draft) ===
According to a 2022 government draft, the mandatory German Animal Husbandry Label would indicate the living conditions on animal products that originate in Germany and are also destined for the German market. The draft envisages a gradual implementation, starting with pig meat.

== Voluntary labels ==
Voluntary animal welfare labels are not required by law. They include the KRAV label in Sweden and RSPCA Assured in the United Kingdom. Many labels are of low quality. The United States charity Animal Welfare Institute assessed 38 voluntary animal welfare labels, mainly from the US. They found that only 4 of them have both "high" standards and compliance verification by a third party. The charity said that most label claims are made "merely for marketing purposes".

== See also ==
- Egg marking
- Farmed animal welfare (Animal welfare § Farmed animals)
