= Free transfer =

Free transfer has the following meanings:

- Free transfer (public transit), the ability to transfer between two transit lines for free
- Free transfer (association football), the release of a player from a team at the expiration of the contract
