= Hugo Travers =

French journalist and video blogger

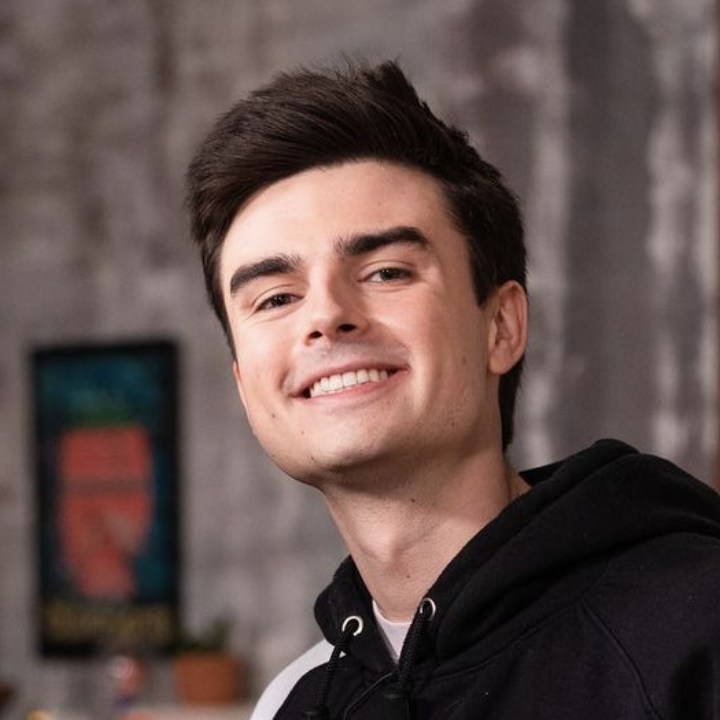
- Hugo Travers en 2022.
- Born: 6 April 1997; Versailles
- Awards: Forbes 30 Under 30 (2023); Chevalier des Arts et des Lettres (2023)

Hugo Travers (French pronunciation: [/y.ɡo tʁa.vɛʁ(s)/], born 6 April 1997), better known under the pseudonym HugoDécrypte ("HugoDeciphers"), is a French journalist and YouTuber known for his video reporting and interviews, which have become a popular source of news for young people in France.

== Biography ==
=== Early life and education ===
Hugo Travers was born on 6 April 1997 in Versailles, Yvelines, Île-de-France and grew up in Ville d'Avray. His father is a British national who works in marketing, while his mother works in human resources. He obtained his baccalauréat économique et social (ES) with an option internationale at the lycée Jean-Pierre-Vernant in Sèvres, Hauts-de-Seine. He entered Sciences Po Paris in 2015 and graduated with a master's degree in communications, Media and Creative Industries in 2020. He planned to become a journalist.

=== Career ===
==== Radio Londres ====
In 2012, while still in school, he launched RadioLondres ("Radio London"), a current affairs website. The name was chosen in reference to a hashtag on Twitter that shared the results of that year's French presidential election despite the ongoing period of silence.

==== HugoDécrypte ====
In 2015, during his first year at Sciences Po, he created the YouTube channel "HugoDécrypte", which aimed to use short videos to provide "a journalistic treatment of the news" for young people.

Over the next few years, he interviewed multiple candidates for the 2017 French presidential election and later the 2019 European Parliament election (such as Nathalie Loiseau, Benoît Hamon, etc.). He even interviewed French president Emmanuel Macron on the eve of the European elections on 24 May 2019.

As part of the YouTube Creators for Change program, he received funding from the company in 2018.

On 17 March 2020, Travers launched a daily format tracking the COVID-19 pandemic named "Point Coronavirus". As the subjects covered quickly diversified, the series was renamed "Actus du Jour", and has continued, along with a podcast version, to the present.

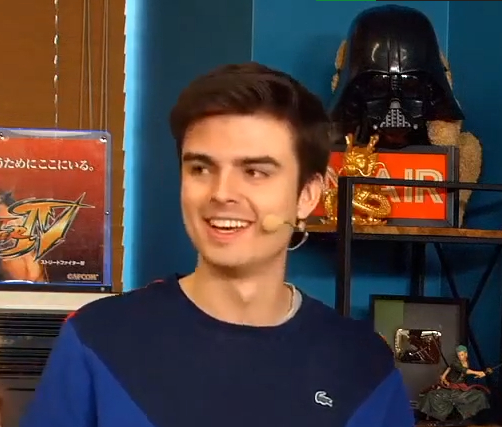
Hugo Travers in 2020

Travers founded Frame55, an influencer marketing agency along with content creator Micode and Jean Sabouret in 2020.

On 5 February 2021, he interviewed Minister of Higher Education Frédérique Vida live on his Twitch channel about the issues facing students due to university closures.

By September 2021, the HugoDécrypte channel had thirteen staff members, which grew to 20 by 2023, mostly young journalists. As of 2024, the channel has a team of 25 employees.

On 23 September 2021, he commented over a political debate broadcast on BFM TV between Éric Zemmour and Jean-Luc Mélenchon. In response, BFM TV reported him and other streamers on the platform livestreaming their feed, leading to a 48-hour ban being placed on Travers' channel. Jean-Luc Mélenchon himself expressed support for the streamers.

On 4 September 2023, he interviewed Emmanuel Macron about the future of French education, in the context of a ban on the abaya in schools. The exchange, titled « Quel avenir pour les jeunes » ("What is the future for young people"), was broadcast live on YouTube and TikTok.

On 17 April 2024, he interviewed Volodymyr Zelenskyy in Ukraine about the Russo-Ukrainian War.

On September 22, 2025, Hugo Travers announced the launch of an office in the French-speaking province of Quebec, Canada, to offer "quality, local information to its subscribers".

==== Mashup ====
On 13 January 2022, Travers launched a weekly talk-show named "Mashup" that is broadcast on Twitch.

==== Elan ====
On 31 March 2024, he launched a digital media company named "Elan" focused on introducing youth to the workforce. Additionally, a job search platform for young people was launched. Elan launched with content on Instagram, YouTube, TikTok and LinkedIn, with further expansion in the works.

== Television ==
During the 2017 French presidential election, Travers was a commentator for the TV channel LCI on Christophe Jakubyszyn's show.

In March 2019, he debated Marine Le Pen over the topic of "fake news" for the show L’Émission politique on France 2.

Travers debated Sarah El Haïry, the secretary of state for youth, on the subject of student anxiety caused by COVID-19-related university closures for Bruce Toussaint's show on BFM TV. Some internet commenters criticized El Haïry for using the informal tu (thou/you) pronoun to address Travers during the debate.

Starting in October 2023, he hosts a show with longer-form (30-minute) interviews on France 2 titled HugoDécrypte : L'interview face cachée, as part of a shift by public broadcaster France Télévisions to increase youth appeal.

== Radio ==
Between 2018 and 2019, he worked as a commentator on Europe 1.

== Reception ==
His status as a journalist and the applicability of the moniker "decryption" for his program, which can be likened to a press review, have been questioned.

Travers has been praised for making information accessible to young people.

On the other hand, his interview with his friend Squeezie for France 2 was criticized as self-serving and promotion by Télérama.

He has also been criticized for political interviews with contradictory statements or lacking, particularly by overcondensing talking points.

== Accolades ==
=== Awards ===
Year	Ceremony	Category	Nomination	Result	Ref.
2022	ForYouAwards	ForYou d'Or	Himself	Nominated	
2023	Forbes 30 Under 30 (France)	Média	HugoDécrypte	Won	
2023	TikTok Awards	For You	HugoDécrypte	Won	
2023	GQ Men of the Year	Journaliste de l'année (Journalist of the year)	Himself	Won	

=== Honors ===
- Chevalier de l'ordre des Arts et des Lettres (2023)
