= 365-Euro-Ticket =

Public transport offers in Austria and Germany

The 365-Euro-Ticket is the official or informal name given to public transport offers in Austria and Germany in some cities or regions for an annual ticket at the price of (approximately) 365 euros.

In Germany these offers are usually only for particular passenger groups such as students and apprentices. With the expiration of the temporary 9-Euro-Ticket (at the end of August 2022), several politicians and trade unionists in Germany demanded a nationwide 365-euro ticket for the general public.

== Examples in Austria ==
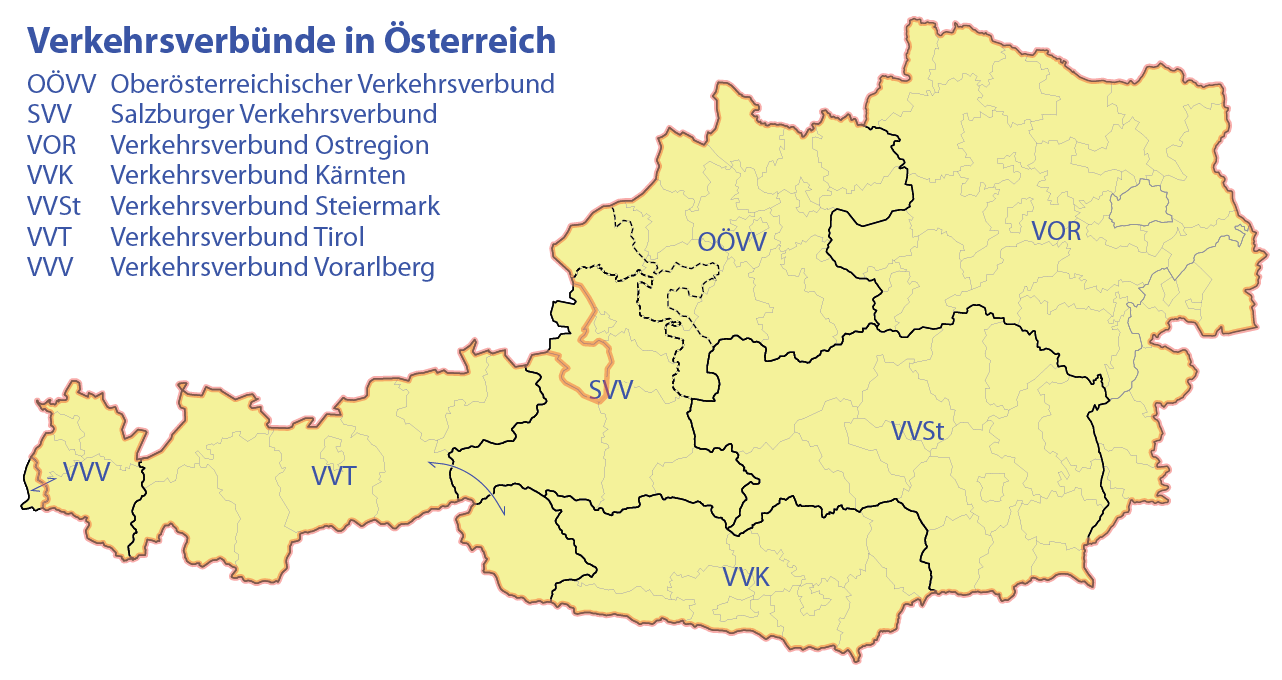
Map of transport associations and tariff associations in Austria

In the following is a (by far) non-exhaustive list of examples for 365-euro tickets in Austria. The first and most prominent example is Vienna since this city was the pioneer for other Austrian and German cities and regions to introduce a 365-euro ticket.

=== Vienna ===
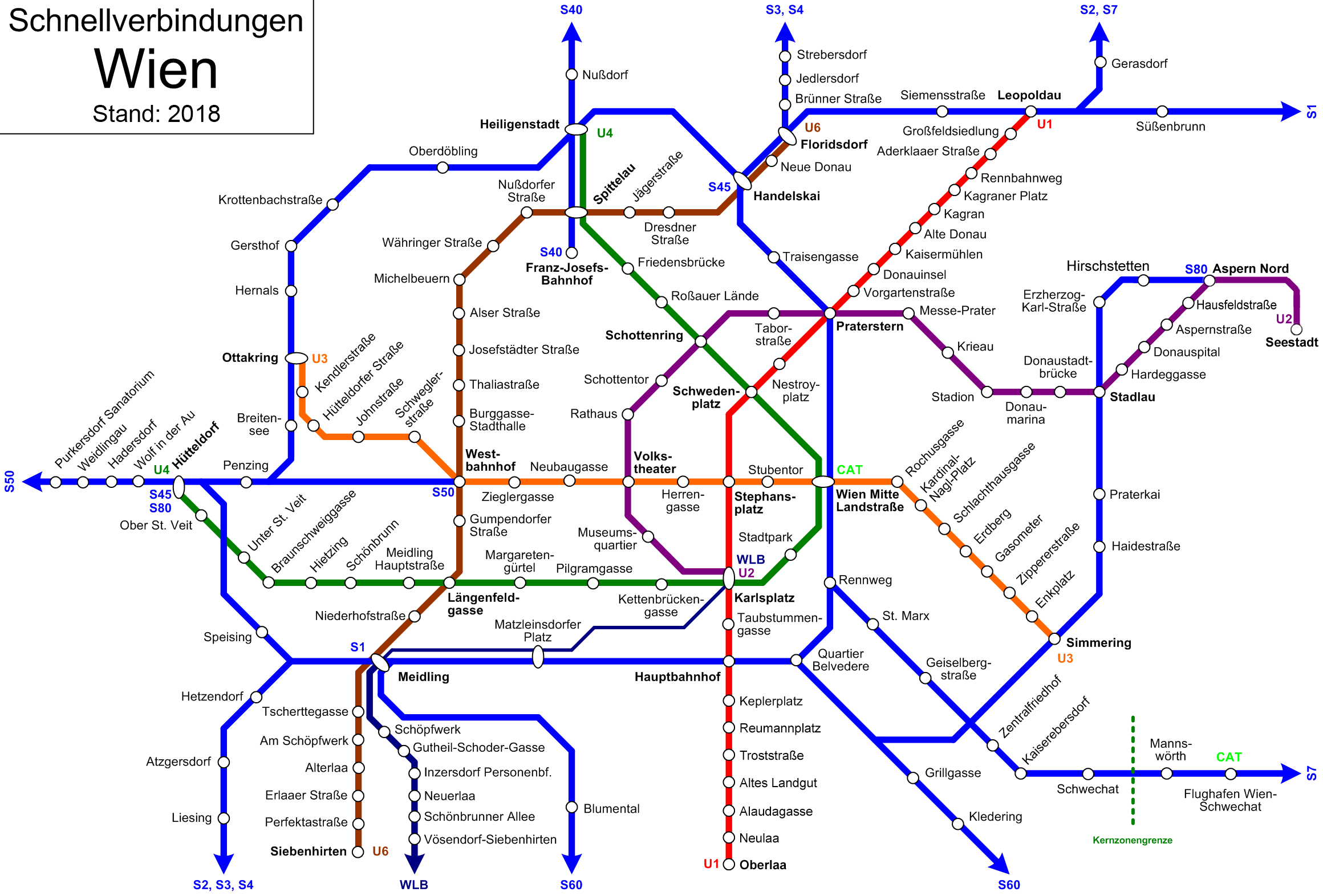
Kernzone Wien des VOR

In May 2012 the local public transport operator Wiener Linien lowered the price of an annual ticket for the city of Vienna, more exactly the Kernzone Wien des Verkehrsverbund Ost-Region (Vienna Core Zone of the Eastern Region Transport Association), to 365 euros for the general public. In 2019 about 822,000 people had an annual ticket while Vienna has approximately 1.9 million inhabitants, and as of September 2022 the ticket price (365 euros) has stayed the same. In September 2025 it was announced that the price would be increased to 467 euros in 2026.

=== Salzburg ===
In Salzburg (state), the annual ticket will cost 365 euros from January 2022 for the general public; it includes all public transport and it extends to the nearby Bavarian town of Freilassing. Since 2025 it has cost 393 euros.

== Examples in Germany ==
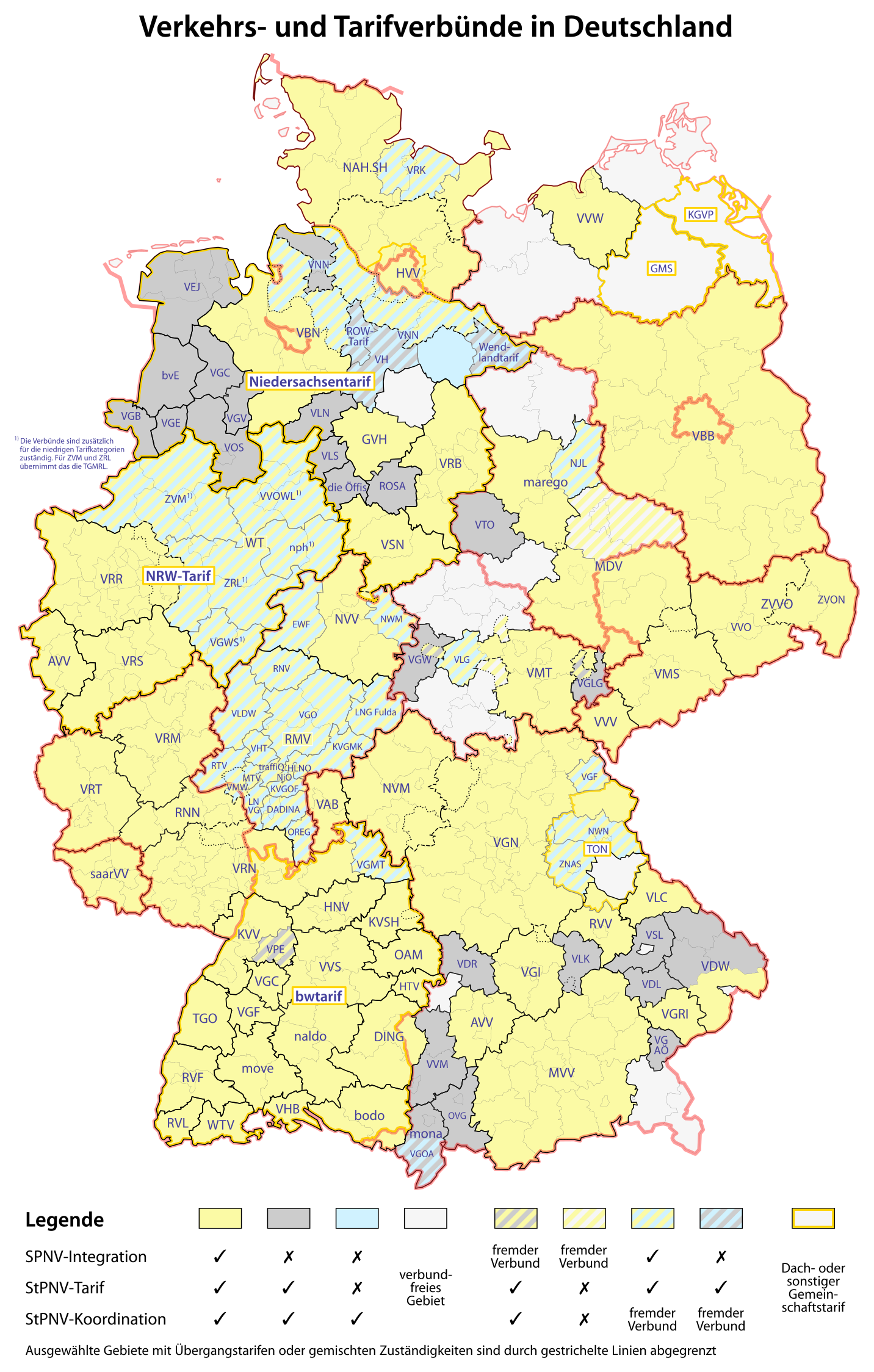
Transport associations in Germany

In the following is a (by far) non-exhaustive list of examples for 365-euro tickets in Germany. A prominent example is Berlin and Brandenburg since the Verkehrsverbund Berlin-Brandenburg covers the largest area of transport associations in Germany.

In this section, "trainees" stands for apprentices who learn a profession and "school students" stands for schoolchildren and adolescent students who go to school and "university students" stands for students who go to a Hochschule (university or Fachhochschule).

=== Berlin and Brandenburg ===
Transport association Berlin-Brandenburg (rail network map)

In August 2019, the local public transport operator Verkehrsverbund Berlin-Brandenburg introduced an annual season ticket for 365 euros that is valid for trainees in the federal states of Berlin and Brandenburg. The current price (2024) is 34,50 euros per month (414 euro per year).

A 29-Euro-Ticket available to everyone and valid within Berlin's borders was introduced in July 2024 under the name Berlin-Abo. It is only available by subscription. Since December 10, 2024, the 29 euro subscription for Berlin local transport can no longer be booked.

=== Baden-Württemberg ===
In March 2023, Baden-Württemberg introduced a statewide 365-euro ticket for people under the age of 21 and for school students, university students, trainees and voluntary service personnel (Federal volunteers service, Federal volunteers service and some other volunteer services) under the age of 27 who live or go to school in the state.

=== Bavaria ===
Currently (September 2022) 365-euro tickets for school students and trainees are available from several municipal transport associations in Bavaria and the federal state currently contributes to 2/3 of the costs of municipalities and transport associations for 365-euro tickets for school students and trainees. But the state government refused to contribute to the financing of similar tickets for university students in July 2022.

List of Bavarian transport associations with 365-Euro-Ticket for school students and trainees (as of September 2022):

- Augsburger Verkehrs- und Tarifverbund (AVV): Das 365-Euro-Ticket AVV für Schüler:innen, Auszubildende, Praktikant:innen und FSJ-ler (de, www.avv-augsburg.de)
- Münchner Verkehrs- und Tarifverbund (MVV): Das 365-Euro-Ticket MVV (de/en/..., www.mvg.de)
- Regensburger Verkehrsverbund (RVV): 365-Euro-Ticket RVV (de, www.rvv.de)
- Verkehrsverbund Großraum Ingolstadt (VGI): 365-Euro-Ticket für Schülerinnen und Schüler sowie Auszubildende (de, www.invg.de)
- Verkehrsverbund Großraum Nürnberg (VGN): 365-Euro-Ticket VGN (en, www.vgn.de)
- Verkehrsverbund Mainfranken (region of Würzburg) (vvm): 365-Euro-Ticket VVM (de, www.vvm-info.de)

=== Hesse ===
From the 2017/18 school year, a 365-euro ticket for school students was introduced in the federal state of Hesse. Since January 2020, there has been a senior citizen ticket for people aged 65 and over at an annual price of €365 (on workdays only usable starting at 9 a.m.) or €625 (always usable).

== See also ==
- 9-Euro-Ticket
- Free public transport
- Klimaticket
- Deutschlandticket
