= Émilie Munera =

French journalist and musicologist

Émilie Munera is a French journalist and musicologist.

== Biography ==
Munera holds a teaching diploma in music history from the École normale de musique de Paris. She then followed the musicology curriculum of the Paris 8 University.

== Career ==
As a journalist, Munera first joined the editorial teams of France Bleu and Piano Magazine. Alongside Lionel Esparza, she was in charge of the musical press review of the early program Deux Sets à Neuf on France Musique, before hosting the Saturday morning entertainment. During the 2010–2011 season, she joined Alex Taylor pour la matinale. Munera hosts Changez de disque !, a program dedicated to musical releases starting in August 2011, then the program En pistes ! based on a similar idea with Rodolphe Bruneau-Boulmier.

She regularly co-hosts the annual Diapasons d'Or ceremony. She is also a teacher of piano and solfège.

With Alexis Goyer, Munera co-authored Rocktionary : pourquoi les noms des groupes ? and Rocktionary 2 : pourquoi les titres de chansons ?, dedicated to the origin of the names of rock bands and the origins of songs.

== Publications ==
- Rocktionary : pourquoi les noms des groupes ?, Alexis Goyer, Émilie Munera, Éditions de Tournon, 239 p, (2007), ISBN 2351440536
- Rocktionary 2 : pourquoi les titres de chansons ?, Alexis Goyer, Émilie Munera, Éditions de Tournon, 196 p, (2013), ISBN 2351440900
