= Klimaticket =

Austrian transit pass

KlimaTicket
- Location: Austria
- Launched: October 26, 2021; 4 years ago
- Technology: Mobile app
- Validity: Local public transport; ÖBB; Westbahn; RegioJet
- Website: klimaticket.at/en

The KlimaTicket is a unified transport pass in Austria, valid on most intercity trains and local public transport across the country. The ticket was introduced in 2021, with a price of €1,095 per year for adults. The KlimaTicket follows in the example of the various 365-Euro-Ticket season tickets, which have been available for certain local areas in Austria.

From 2026, the annual price will be €1,400 per year. There are reduced rates for people under 26, over 65 and for the disabled. These cost initially €821 per year (€2.25 per day). It was introduced on October 26, 2021, the Austrian national day. The KlimaTicket has inspired similar initiatives in other countries in Europe, including the Deutschlandticket.

== Pricing ==
The price has been 1,300 euros since August 2025. The reduced ticket has since cost 975 euros. From 2026 the ticket costs €1,400, reduced price €1,050.

From July 2024 to April 2025, 18-year-olds were entitled to a free one-year KlimaTicket. They have three years to collect the ticket. The possible start of validity is from the 18th birthday to one day before the 21st birthday. The prerequisite was residence in Austria. On April 18, 2025, the Ministry of Transport announced that the free climate ticket for 18-year-olds would be discontinued. Tickets that has already been issued remains valid until the printed end date.

Conscripts in the Austrian Armed Forces get the ticket for free while serving.

== Validity ==
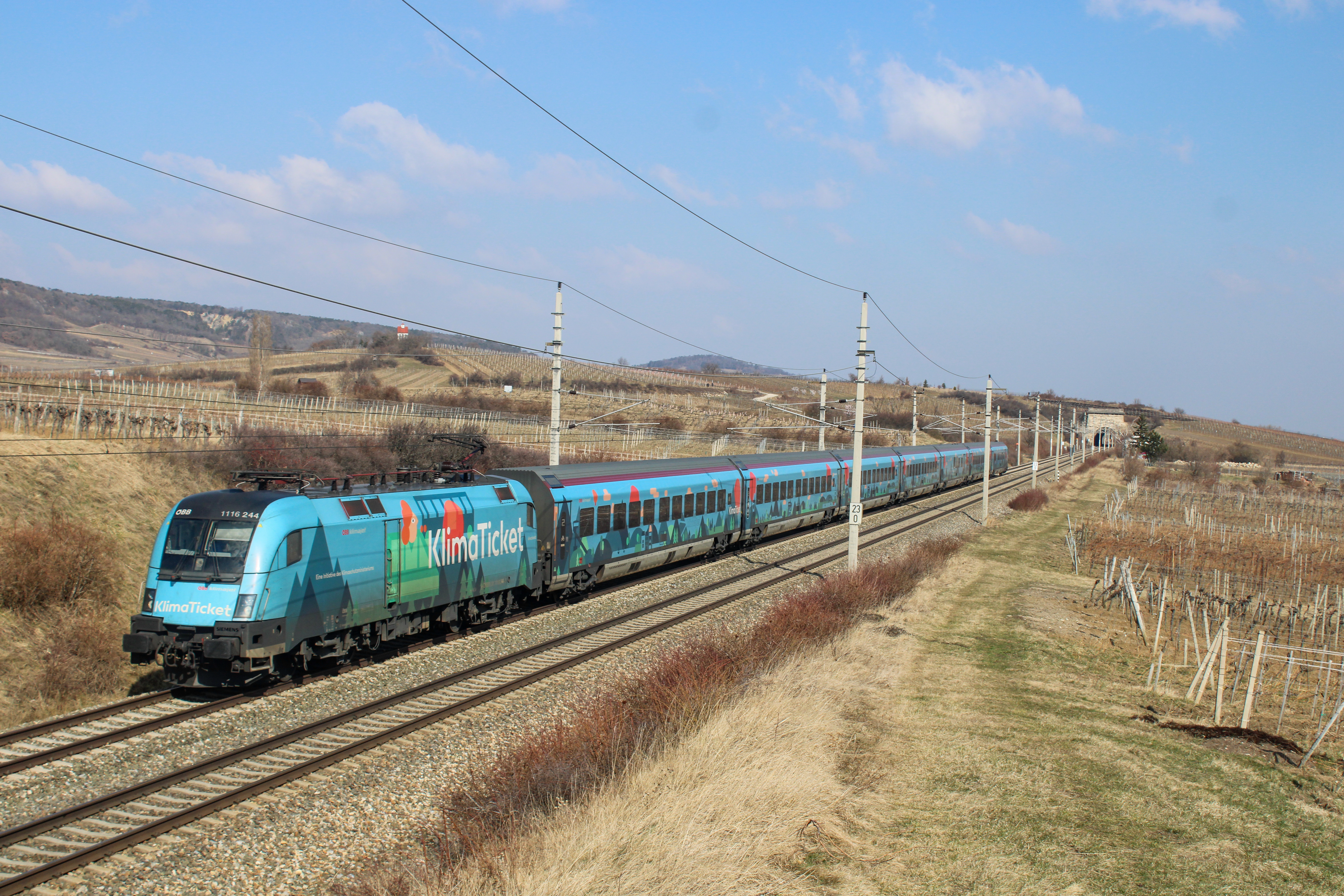
Railjet "Klimajet" train promoting the KlimaTicket in Pfaffstätten

The ticket is valid on the second class of ÖBB, Westbahn, RegioJet, and all local public transport in Austria. It does not apply to long-distance buses such as FlixBus.

On RegioJet trains, the ticket is valid between Břeclav (Czechia) – Vienna – Hegyeshalom (Hungary) with reservation, and in some cases without reservation. Westbahn has special lower pricing for Klimaticket owners when traveling to Germany with their KlimaPlus-Ticket. MÁV Személyszállítási Zrt. has a flat price ticket called "START KlimaTicket Mix" for Klimaticket owners traveling from Vienna anywhere in Hungary via Hegyeshalom: €20 second class, €30 first class.

There are also variants of the Klimaticket that are only valid in one federal state. They cost between €396 and €703 per year (variant without discount for young people or seniors). There is also a joint ticket for Vienna, Lower Austria and Burgenland, the VORKlimaTicket Metropolregion. It costs €1.000 (reduced rate €700).

== See also ==
- 9-Euro-Ticket
- 365-Euro-Ticket
- Deutschlandticket
