= Paragraph 219a =

German penal law

Paragraph 219a (§ 219a, Paragraf Zweihundertneunzehn-a) was a German penal law in the Strafgesetzbuch that prohibited medical professionals from mentioning that they provide abortions. It is out of force since 19 July 2022.

The bill that repealed paragraph 219a passed the Bundestag on 24 June with the votes of the Scholz traffic light coalition and votes from The Left party. Then, the Bundesrat confirmed the repeal, not using its right to objection, on 8 July. The repeal was assented to by the German federal president on 18 July 2022.

== History ==
The law dated back to § 219 and § 220 of the Reichsstrafgesetzbuch as at 1 June 1933, in early Nazi Germany. Both paragraphs resulted from a right-wing populist debate dating back to the Weimar Republic and the previous German Empire.

=== Final reform in 2019 ===
§ 219a was amended multiple times. The last amendment happened In 2019, under the Fourth Merkel cabinet. The change allowed medical practices to mention on their websites that they conduct abortions, but no more information such as which methods they offered, how abortions work, or how safe they are.

The new § 219a led to some more lawsuits with resulting fines. The first medical doctor sentenced under the reformed paragraph was fined 2,000 euros in 2019 for stating, "Medical abortion without anaesthetic in a protected atmosphere is also part of our services." The violation consisted in specifying, beyond the mere fact they offer abortions, that the procedure was "without anaesthetic" and "medical" as opposed to surgical abortion.

In another case in 2019, a German gynaecologist practice was fined 2,500 euros for stating on their website that they conducted "abortion, surgically or medically with Mifegyne".
