= BahnCard =

German railway loyalty program

BahnCard (German Bahn – Rail) is a discount subscription programme offered by Deutsche Bahn (DB), the German national railway company. Unlike airline loyalty programs, but similarly to the UK Railcard, the BahnCard entitles the passenger to a discount price and must be purchased prior to travel. The BahnCard is offered in a non-business and a business version called BahnCard Business. Non-business BahnCard contracts are automatically renewed each year, unless they are cancelled with sufficient notice. Three variants of BahnCard are sold by Deutsche Bahn: The BahnCard 25, the BahnCard 50, and the BahnCard 100. The first two variants allow passengers to get 25 per cent and 50 per cent discount respectively on standard long-distance rail fares, while the Mobility BahnCard 100 is a type of annual ticket that allows free, unlimited travel on most of the German railway network for a fixed price. The non-business BahnCard 25/50 are valid for one year and can only be purchased by subscription. If they are not cancelled no later than six weeks before the expiry date, their term is automatically extended by another year. BahnCard Business 25/50 are also valid for one year but require no cancellation. Unlike the personal BahnCard, BahnCard Business can be combined with the discount that is granted to large-volume business customers.

In 2007 there were 4.01 million BahnCard holders in Germany, approximately five per cent of Germany's population. More than half of the passenger revenue of DB Fernverkehr (long-distance) comes from tickets sold to BahnCard holders. Apart from entitling the holder to discounts, the BahnCard also functions as an ID card for the validation of online tickets and mobile phone tickets and for purchasing tickets from vending machines. BahnCard holders can also call a discounted hotline printed on the cards, and an optional travel insurance can be included.

== History ==
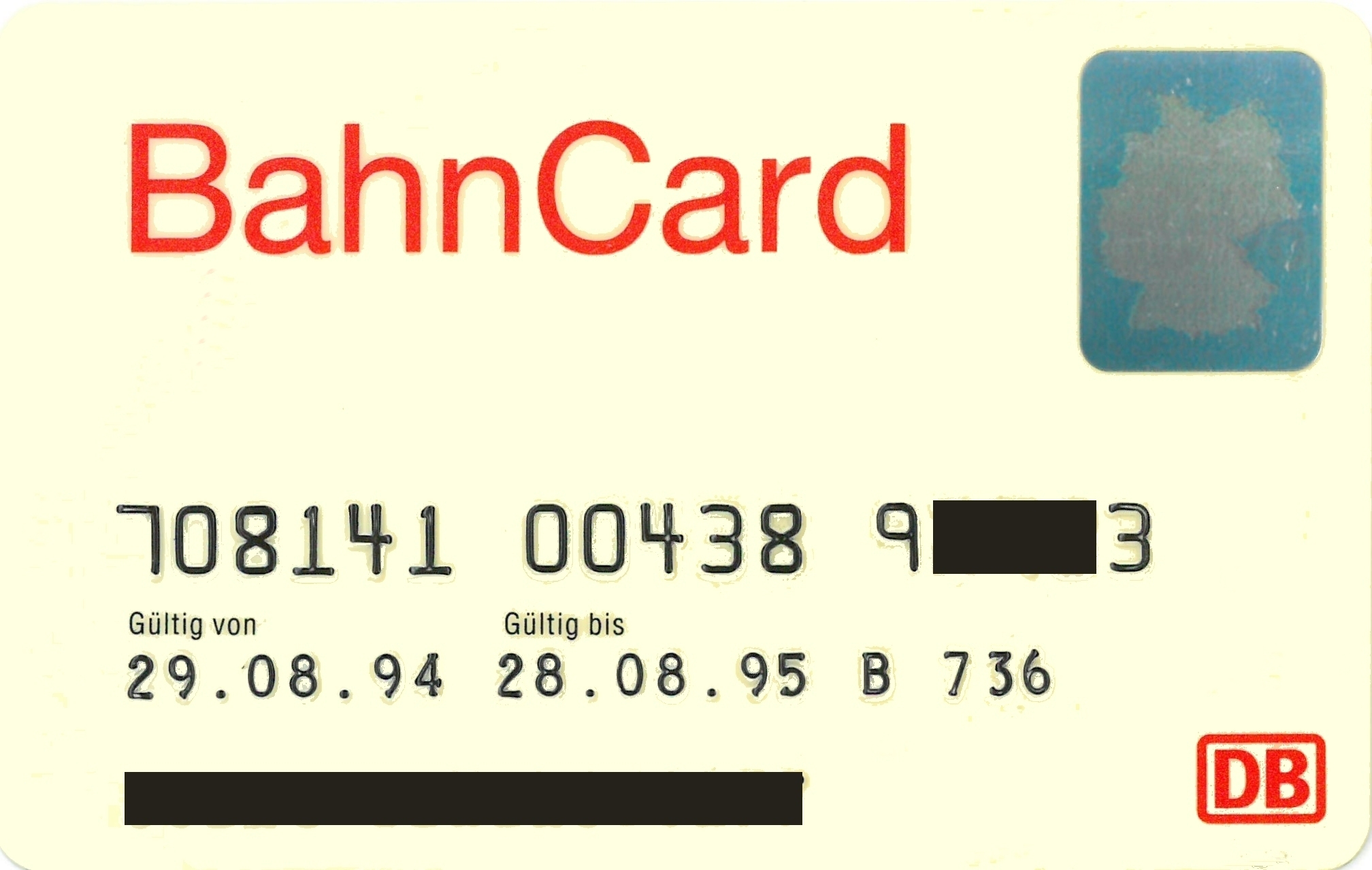
BahnCard 25 from 1994.

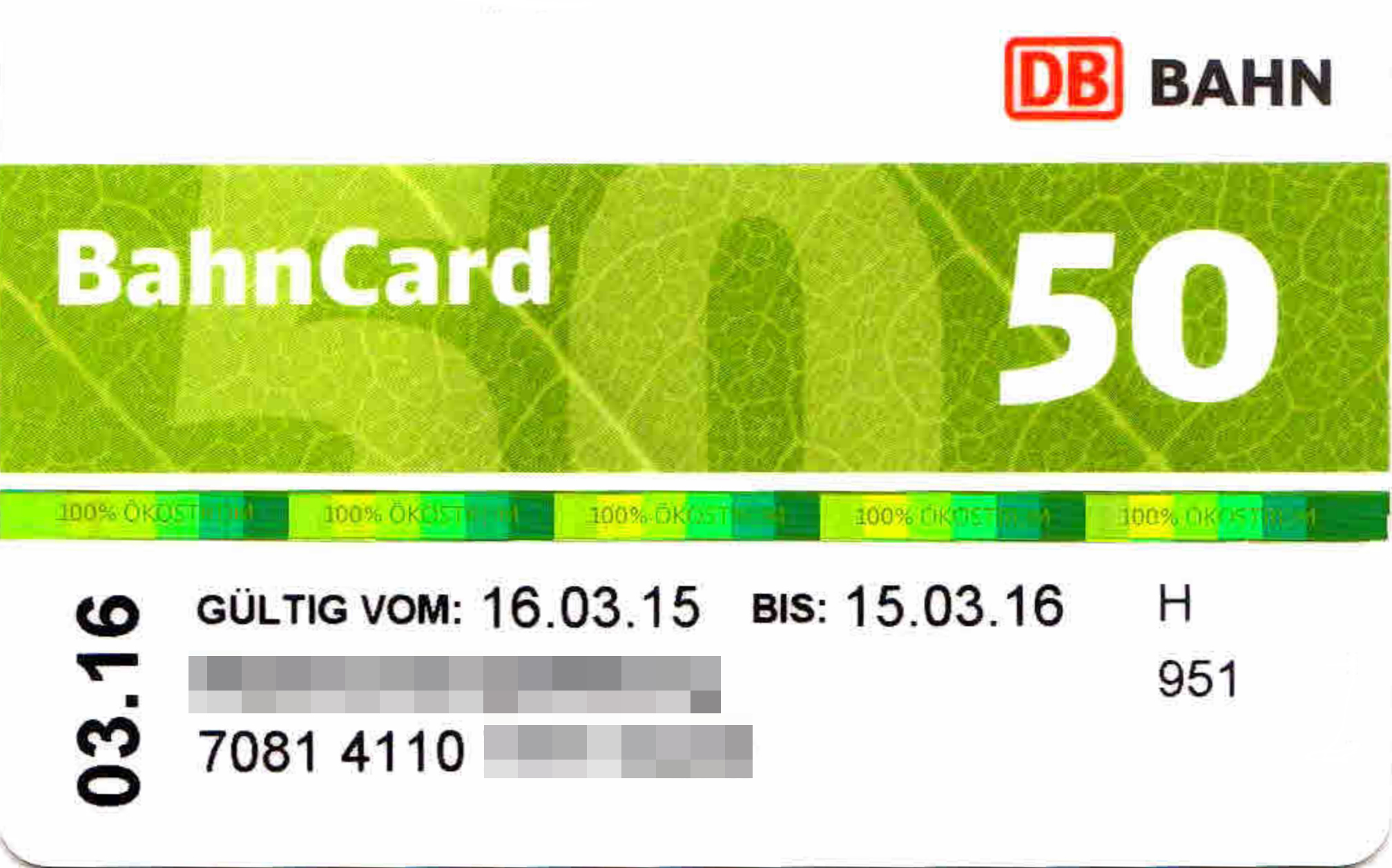
BahnCard 50 from 2015.

=== Predecessors: 1955-1992 ===
A predecessor of the present-day BahnCard was introduced in 1955 by Franz-Josef Wuermeling, the then Minister for Family Affairs. Discounted train tickets became available for families with many children, and the eligibility pass became known as The Wuermeling This pass was offered until 1999.

In 1975 a Senior rail pass was introduced by the Bundesbahn, valid for men older than 65 years and women older than 60 years, and entitling them to a discount of 50 per cent on long-distance train tickets. Later similar passes were introduced for minors and families, valid for journeys longer than 51 kilometres (32 mi) (reduced to 31 kilometres (19 mi) later). In the Deutsche Reichsbahn (DR), the East German rail company, which was later merged with the Bundesbahn, normal student ID cards entitled students to a discount of 50 per cent on all journeys and 75 per cent if the journey was between home and university.

=== Introduction and growth: 1992-2002 ===
The main motivation for introducing the BahnCard was to increase competitiveness against the automobile. Prior to the BahnCard, Deutsche Bahn priced a trip between any two points related to the distance travelled; this pricing structure proved uncompetitive with driving. The card allowed a two-dimensional pricing schedule, which consists of card price (a fixed cost), and ticket price (a variable cost). Once a passenger has bought a card, its price becomes a sunk cost and this makes the train more like the automobile, which is also characterised by high fixed costs. The decision whether to take a car or train for a particular journey depends mostly on the marginal price per kilometer, not on the total cost. The effect of the BahnCard was to shift the marginal cost of the train journey below that of the car journey for many customers.

The BahnCard itself was introduced on 1 October 1992. Initially the card was available for second class travel and 50 per cent discount only, but at Christmas 1992, the BahnCard First for the first class was launched along with gift vouchers for the new product. By the end of the year, it was bought by 650,000 clients. A major advertising campaign was started by the (then called) Bundesbahn, where the card was marketed under the slogan travel for a year for half the price. The TV advertising campaign for the new product won several awards. The introduction of the BahnCard coincided with the launch of the high-speed InterCityExpress trains, a luxury service that gained wider customer acceptance than previous intercity trains. One million BahnCards were sold by 20 January 1993.

In July 1995, a BahnCard with credit card functionality was introduced in cooperation with Citibank. Two new versions were now offered in addition to the original card, a BahnCard with Visa payment and credit card function a BahnCard with Visa Electron payment (a rechargeable debit card). The credit card Bahncards were valid for a period of two years, and the regular card still for a period of one year. The validity of the cards was altered from the exact day to the end of a month. The new cards now also included a photograph of the customer. The DM 50 (€25) fee for replacement cards (in case of loss) was abolished, and a dining car voucher worth €5 was included with new cards. The customer data and photographs were processed in the US, which raised privacy concerns with some groups.

This campaign, called "better BahnCard", was criticised by the newspaper Die Zeit in June 1996, which reported that customers were tricked into buying the credit card version against their will and that organisational errors lead to delays of several months and the delivery of incorrect cards. In June 1996 the magazine Focus reported that "CitiBank must improve BahnCards". Despite a high-profile marketing campaign, customers largely rejected the "better BahnCard"; only 390,000 were sold by May 1996 instead of the projected 1.5 million. The partnership with CitiBank was terminated on 31 March 1999.

In 1995, the Rhein-Main-Verkehrsverbund was the first local public transport network outside Deutsche Bahn to join the BahnCard system. A 40 per cent discount on all local train, tram and bus tickets was offered to BahnCard holders, and included in promotional tickets such as the Guten-Abend-Ticket. Long distance DB tickets with Frankfurt as a destination also allowed a single free connecting journey for non-BahnCard customers. In exchange, Rhein-Main-Verkehrsverbund customers were able to use Deutsche Bahn Interregio (regional) trains for free. Commuters who held season tickets of the Rhein-Main-Verkehrsverbund could now also use Intercity, Eurocity, and InterCityExpress trains in the Rhein-Main area for a small surcharge.

=== New tariff model and diversification: 2002-present ===
Towards the end of 2002, Deutsche Bahn undertook a major reform of its pricing strategy. The linear pricing model (where ticket prices were fixed and proportional to distance travelled) that had existed for over a century was partly replaced with a new model. Though the old fare system for standard tickets was kept largely unchanged, a degree of yield management was introduced for discounted tickets. As a part of this reform the discount offered to Bahncard holders was reduced from 50 per cent to 25 per cent. The justification was that the Bahncard discount was now valid on top of the new saver fares (called Plan-und-Spar) that offered discounts of up to 40 per cent on the standard fares but were only available under certain conditions (non-exchangeable; booking more than three days in advance; return journey required; "weekend rule"; limited number of seats).

This reform proved highly unpopular with customers. After passenger protests and declining passenger numbers, the pricing model was modified again in August 2003. The original 50 per cent discount Bahncard was reintroduced alongside the 25 per cent Bahncard, however its price was increased from €120 to €200.

On 14 December 2003 the City ticket (see below) was launched in 44 cities in cooperation with the Verband Deutscher Verkehrsunternehmen (Union of German Transport Operators), Deutsche Bahn, and the individual local transport companies. On 12 December 2004, another 13 cities joined the scheme; on 11 December 2005 (coinciding with the new DB timetable) another 19, on 1 April 2007 another 16, and on 10 December 2007 yet 7 more. 100 million rail tickets with "City-ticket" function were sold by the beginning of 2008.

Between 2004 and 2008 the number of BahnCard holders grew by one million to 4.01 million, the highest in the history of the card.

In March 2024, DB announced that it would no longer issue BahnCard 25 and 50 in plastic card form from July 2024, requiring its smartphone apps to access the virtual version.

== Current tariff structure ==
Bahncard prices per year in 2025
	Second Class	First Class
BahnCard 25	€62.90	€125.00
BahnCard 50	€244.00	€492.00
BahnCard 100	€4,899.00	€7,999.00

=== BahnCard 25 ===
The BahnCard 25 entitles the holder to 25 per cent discounts on all fares. It also applies if the passenger travels with a group of people.

BahnCard 100 customers receive a free BahnCard 25 for another relative. Families can purchase more BahnCard 25 for household members for about 1/5 of the price. Minors can purchase the BahnCard 25 for €7.90, valid for one year. Since 2010 there has been a reduced Bahncard 25 for people aged 65 and over. It costs €40.90, or for 1st class €81.90. For customers under 27, the reduced offer is called My BahnCard 25 and costs €39.90 in 2nd class or €81.90 in 1st class.

=== BahnCard 50 ===
The BahnCard 50 enables a 50 per cent discount on standard walk-on fares and 25 per cent discount on fares already discounted.

In 2006 there were 1.8 million BahnCard 50 in circulation, and BahnCard 50 passengers undertake an average of 50 train journeys a year, according to Deutsche Bahn.

=== BahnCard 100 ===
The BahnCard 100 allows unlimited travel on the entire Deutsche Bahn network and 118 local public transport networks across Germany; for this reason "+ City" is printed on the BahnCard 100. The card itself is valid as a ticket. For journeys across the country's border or Night lines a surcharge is required. Since May 2023, the BahnCard 100 includes the Deutschlandticket, and thereby allows the user to use the most local public transport networks across Germany.

The BahnCard 100 is aimed at business travellers and frequent travelers who make more than 30 long-distance journeys a year. The Bahncard 100 automatically qualifies the passenger for Deutsche Bahn's VIP program called bahn.comfort. Card holders enjoy a number of privileges like free baggage collection from home and access to VIP lounges at train stations.

The car sharing service offered by Deutsche Bahn can be used at discounted rates by card holders. An electronic key based on RFID technology integrated into the card allows to unlock carsharing vehicles parked near train stations. The RFID chip that is included in the cards has been criticised for violating privacy rights, and has been cited as part of the reason that Deutsche Bahn received the Big Brother Award in 2007.

== BahnCard and Bus operators ==
Many bus companies in Germany, including most of the regional bus routes operated by DB, accept the BahnCard if not traveling fully within the area of a Passenger Transport Executive. The same discount of 25 per cent applies both to the BahnCard 25 and the BahnCard 50, and the Mobility BahnCard 100 is valid as a full ticket. The Deutsche Bahn-owned bus operators in Sachsen and Brandenburg do not accept the BahnCard.

== Railplus ==
From 9 December 2007, the "Railplus" function was automatically included in the price of the Bahncard 25/50 which had a RailPlus logo on its reverse. This meant that passengers could purchase international tickets to 24 European countries with a 15 per cent discount, regardless of whether the journey began or passed through the RailPlus card's country of origin. Before December 2007, this option was only available for trips to Austria and Switzerland as part of the "TEE Rail Alliance".

Railplus was discontinued at the end of 2023.
