= Franz-Josef Wuermeling =

German politician

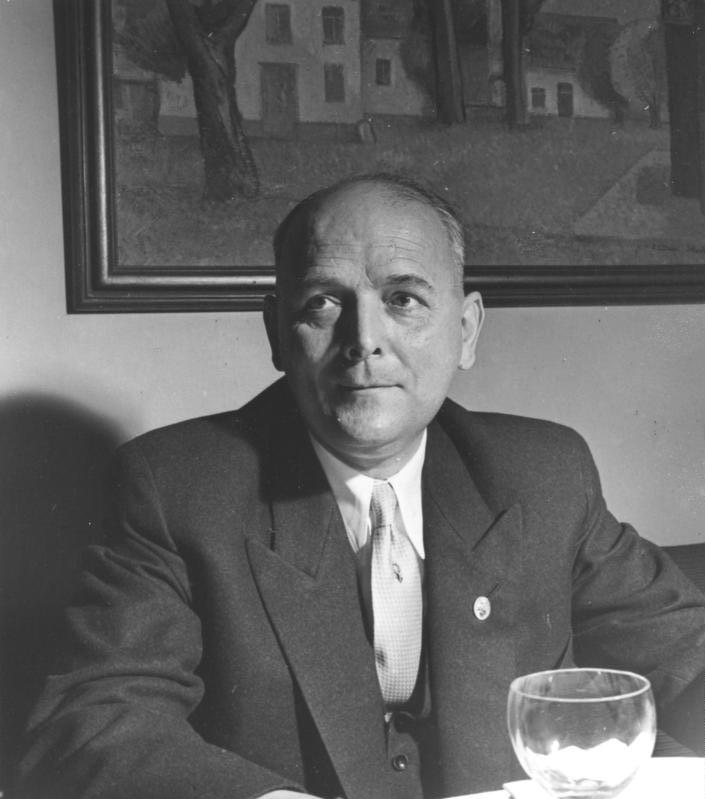
- Wuermeling in 1950

Federal Minister for Family Affairs
- In office 1953–1962
- Chancellor: Konrad Adenauer
- Preceded by: Post created
- Succeeded by: Bruno Heck

Personal details
- Born: 8 November 1900 Charlottenburg, Berlin, German Empire
- Died: 7 March 1986 (aged 85) Münster, North Rhine-Westphalia, West Germany
- Education: University of Münster; University of Hamburg; University of Freiburg

Franz-Josef Wuermeling (8 November 1900 – 7 March 1986) was a West German CDU politician and minister who served as Federal Minister for Family Affairs from 1953 to 1962.

== Early life and education ==
Wuermeling was born in Charlottenburg, Berlin in 1900. His father, Bernhard, worked at the Reichsamt des Innern and the Reichsarbeitsamt, the Ministry of the Interior and the Ministry of Labour in the German Empire. Wuermeling attended school in Berlin and studied law and economics at Münster University, Hamburg University and Freiburg University. He served in the German Navy in the First World War.

== Political career ==
Wuermeling was the mayor of Linz for a year in 1945 before being elected to the Rhineland Landtag (Parliament) where he served as a Secretary in the State Ministry of the Interior from 1947 to 1949. In the 1949 German federal election, Wuermeling was elected to the West German Bundestag.

=== Adenauer cabinet ===
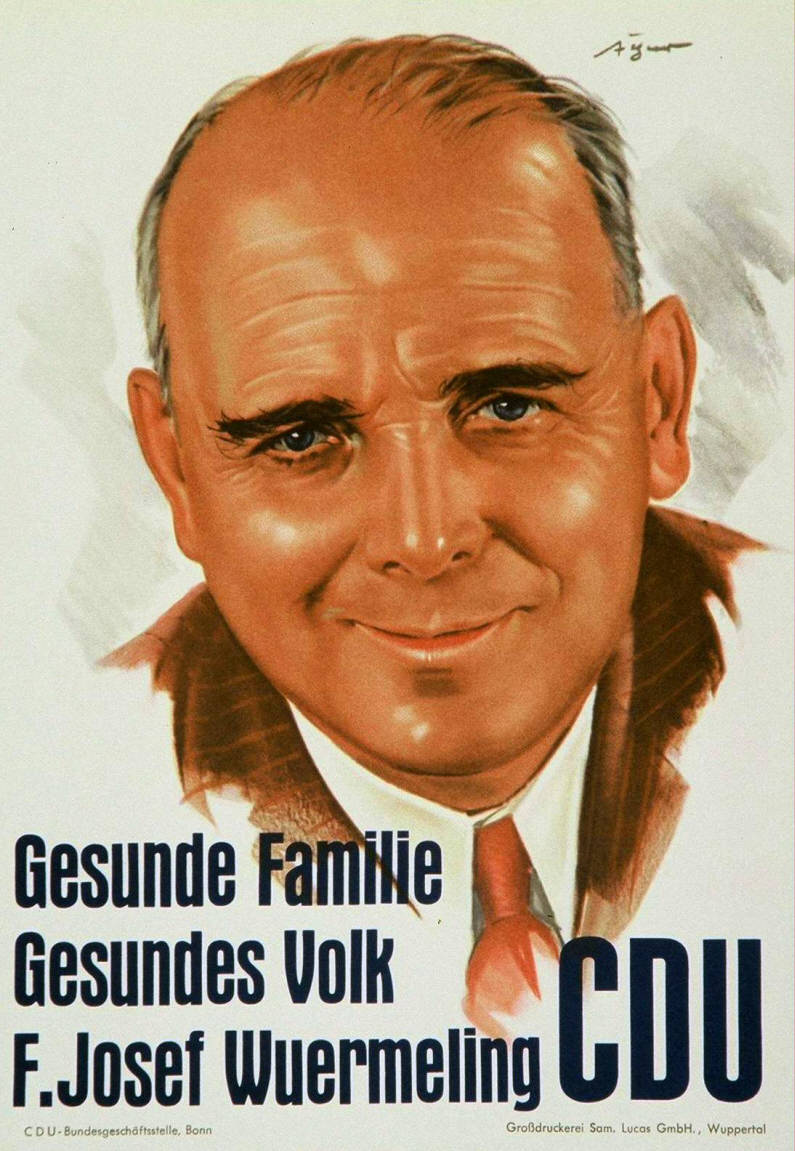
A campaign poster featuring Wuermeling c. 1957

After the 1953 election, Wuermeling was appointed the first Federal Minister for Family Affairs. Wuermeling would stay in the post through Adenauer's second, third and fourth ministries until December 1962.

He introduced the so-called "Wuermeling pass" which enabled families with children to travel at a discounted price.

== Honours ==
Wuermeling received the following honours:

=== National orders ===
- (West Germany) Commander's Cross of the Order of Merit of the Federal Republic of Germany

=== International orders ===
- (France) Grand Officer of the Legion of Honour
- (Holy See) Grand Cross of the Order of Saint Gregory the Great

== See also ==
- Konrad Adenauer
