= Bioland =

Bioland Verband für organisch-biologischen Landbau e.V.
- Founded: 1971; 55 years ago
- Founder: 12 farmer families, including Hans and Maria Müller
- Type: Registered association
- Purpose: Organic movement
- Origins: Based on 1951 theories of Dr. Hans Müller and Dr. Hans Peter Rusch
- Method: Certification
- Members: 5719 farmers, 989 business partners
- Key people: Jan Plagge (president)
- Website: www.bioland.de

Bioland is the largest organic-food association in Germany. Its organic certification standards exceed EU minimum requirements.

== History ==
During the 1920s, a number of agricultural movements began with the goal of countering the effect of industrialization and globalization on food production. One of these was the Jungbauernbewegung (or Bauernheimatbewegung, "farmer heimat movement") farmer movement, which influenced Bioland.

The Jungbauernbewegung was founded in 1923 in Grosshöchstetten to provide poor Swiss farmers with agricultural techniques requiring only local resources. Its founder, Hans Müller, was an accredited botanist and high-school teacher who joined the Swiss parliament in 1929. His farmer-oriented party gathered 13.8 percent of the parliamentary vote in the 1938 elections. When the party dissolved in 1946, Müller turned to agriculture. With his wife Maria and German physician Hans Peter Rusch, Müller began developing agricultural theories based on a closed, organic cycle.

In 1951 they invited other farmers to their Möschberg farm to demonstrate the success of their methods, which had been adopted by a number of farmers in southern Germany. In subsequent years, similar meetings were held at Möschberg. In 1971 the Scharf, Colsman, Sippel, Rinklin, Wenz, Müller, Teschemacher, Hoops and Müller farm families founded a bio-gemüse (organic vegetable) association based on an initiative by Rusch.

The original 12 founders developed formal guidelines for organic-vegetable production, which were published in 1972. In 1974, the association was renamed Fördergemeinschaft organisch-biologischer Landbau e.V.. At first, it used the brand name Dr. Müller Bio Gemüse for products sold in Reformhaus food stores. In 1978, the certification trademark Bioland was registered. A number of regional Bioland associations were founded throughout Germany.

== Certification ==
When the EU harmonized standards for organic food production, the older organic food associations criticized the new standards as weaker than existing guidelines. After the resolution of the EU organic-food recommendation, the associations brought their standards in line with the EU's so any Bioland-certified organic food would meet the requirements for EU organic-food (although Bioland's requirements exceed those of the EU).

Certification guidelines	Bioland	EU Eco-regulation
Farmland use	100% of the farm must be based on organic food production.	Allows organic and traditional food production on the same farm
Max. number of animals per ha	Permissible number of animals is lower for poultry and pigs: 140 laying hens, 280 chicken or 10 fattening pigs per ha	Permissible number of animals is higher for poultry and pigs: 230 hens, 580 chicken, 14 fattening pigs per ha
Nitrogen fertilizer	Amount limited by available livestock (lower than the legal maximum)	Amount limited by national laws setting a legal maximum by farmland area
Organic-waste fertilizer	Blood, meat, bone, manure and guano prohibited	Dried blood, guano, meat and bone meal are allowed.
Copper pesticides	Only for perennial vegetables (3 kg/ha/year)	Up to 6 kg/ha/year
Additional purchased fodder	No more than 50%; majority of pasture must be grown on the farm	Any amount allowed
Genetically modified seed	No genetically modified seeds allowed (includes a ban on purchased fodder from genetically modified plants	
Additional ingredients	Certified product must contain 100% organic ingredients.	Certified product must contain at least 95% organic ingredients.

== Bio mit Gesicht initiative ==
The Bioland association and subsidiaries, like the Bioland market, are members of the Bio mit Gesicht initiative which increases transparency in organic-food production. Organic products may have a "BMG" number, which can be entered on a website showing the farm and farmer. The idea parallels an EU initiative where all eggs must bear a number which can be entered on a website for details of their origin. Only the address of the farm was initially shown, but the website was updated to include photos as well. While the egg number is regulated by European law, the BMG number is voluntary. Notable organic-food associations include Bioland, Naturland and Demeter International (Demeter). The Bio mit Gesicht association shares an address with the German branch of the Research Institute of Organic Agriculture (FIBL), which is based on a Swiss initiative (Bio Suisse organic certification).
