= Transit pass =

Transit ticket for multiple trips

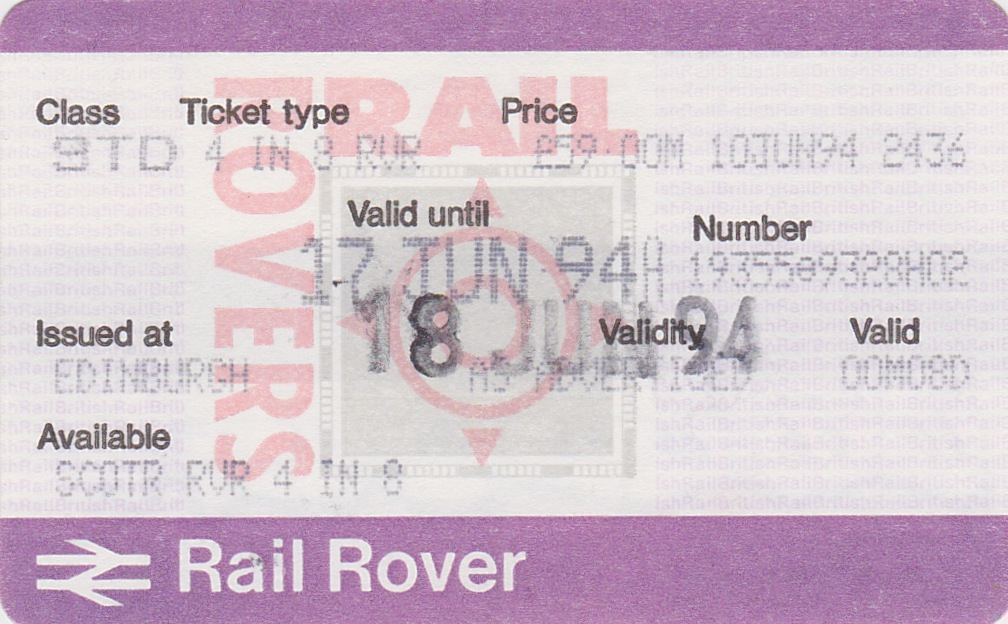
4 day rail rover (UK, 1994)

A transit pass (North American English) or travel card (British English), often referred to as a bus pass or train pass etc. (in all English dialects), is a ticket that allows a passenger of the service to take either a certain number of pre-purchased trips or unlimited trips within a fixed period of time.

Depending on the transport network and on how much the pass is used, the pass may offer varying discounts compared with trips that are purchased individually. While transit passes can generally be purchased at full price by anyone wishing to use the services (senior citizens, tourists, the disabled, students and some others are often able to get them at a reduced price) many employers, colleges, and universities will subsidize the cost of them, or sometimes the full amount.

Some public transport networks will allow certain types of personnel, including police officers, fire fighters, active military, and their own employees to ride their services free with proper identification and without the need to purchase a pass. In a lot of cases, the identification can be scanned on the ticket validator like any other transit pass.

== Types of passes ==
Some common forms of transit passes are:

- Day pass - offers unlimited rides on the day of purchase; ofttimes, over 24 hours. Usually available for purchase on the bus being boarded.
- Weekly pass - allows unlimited rides in a seven-day period. While some networks allow the pass to be purchased for any seven-day period, others offer these passes only for the same range of seven days (usually either Sunday to Saturday or Monday to Sunday).
- Monthly pass - allows unlimited rides for an entire month. Since months vary in length, the discount for the use of such a pass varies each month. Some networks allow the pass to be used for a specified 30-day or 31-day period that does not necessarily have to start on the first of the month.
- Annual pass - allows unlimited rides for the entire year and usually offers a higher discount than the monthly pass.
- Multi-trip tickets - allow bulk purchase for a lower fare per trip. Historically, these have often been in the form of tokens, but tokens are being discontinued in many places in favor of more high-tech methods of fare collection.

== Asia ==
=== Hong Kong ===
With the Octopus smartcard many transport operators, including bus, minibus and railway companies provide free transfers or discounts on the second leg of the journey. Also, the major bus companies, as well as MTR, the railway operator, offer a discounted flat fare for senior citizens on certain days of the week, at HK$1 and HK$2 respectively.

== Europe ==
=== Austria ===
In Austria, the Klimaticket (lit. 'Climate Ticket') allows travelling on most trains and local public transport. It was introduced in 2021. At the regional level, the 365-Euro-Ticket permits the use of public transport.

=== Germany ===
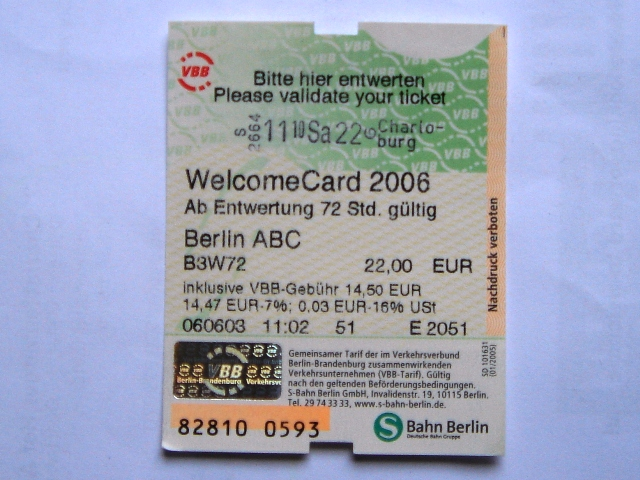
Berlin Welcome Card

A "semester ticket" is a student transit pass issued by universities and Fachhochschulen in Germany allowing students to travel on the buses, trams, subways, and local trains of the school's home city. The cost of the semester ticket is included in the university's student fees, and it can be used in the state where the university is situated. The ticket is valid for transit on the subway (U-Bahn), suburban trains (S-Bahn), street trams, and buses in that state, but is not valid on Intercity-Express trains.

=== Lithuania ===
In Vilnius, Lithuania, a travel card is used for the public transport.

=== Denmark ===
In Denmark there is a universal travelcard called "rejsekort" which is valid all trains, buses and light rail in the country, as well as the Øresundståg to Malmö.

=== Norway ===
Travel card systems are used in most of the local public transport in Norway. In the counties of Oslo and Akershus, reisekort (meaning simply "travel card", formerly Flexus) is used for the T-bane (Metro), tramway and the Municipal bus system. In Sør-Trøndelag, t:kort (meaning "t:card") is used. In Rogaland, Kolumbuskort (meaning "Kolumbus card") is used. In Hordaland, Skysskortet (meaning "Skyss card") is used. In addition, several other counties use similar travel card systems.

=== Ireland ===
A prepaid TFI Leap Card is available for transport in the greater Dublin area, providing access to LUAS, DART and Dublin Bus services. The card may be topped up online.

=== Russia ===
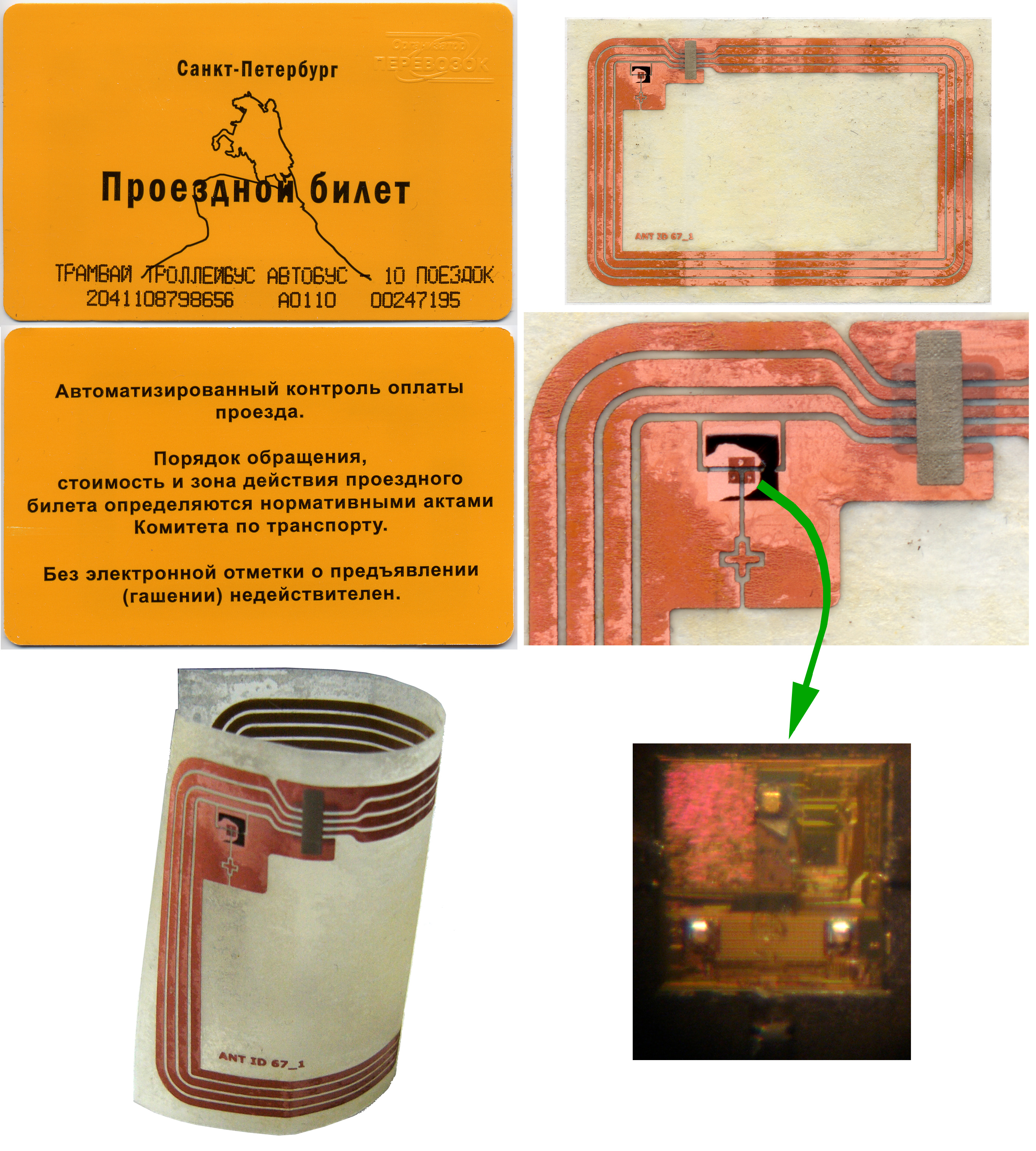
Russia, Saint-Petersburg: paper based 10 trips electronic (RFID) transit pass

Prepaid transit passes are moving toward electronic plastic-based or paper-based contactless cards.

==== Saint Petersburg ====
Early cards are plastic based and limited only for underground railway trips. For surface transportation they have unlimited trips within a fixed period of time. A passenger has to pay a security deposit of 30 roubles for the card itself. When the pass expires, passenger can recharge it with the same or another type of fare or return the card and get the security deposit back. The card itself expires 90 days after not being recharged. In this case, the security deposit cannot be returned.

In 2010 appeared the first non-rechargeable disposable paper-based electronic transit passes for a certain number of trips on trams, trolleybuses and buses. They are sold with a protective foil sticker, which should be removed prior to first use. They are not time-limited except that they expire 30 days after the countrywide or citywide fare changes, which happens usually each 1–2 years.

In 2011 the "Podorozhnik" ("Plantago") cards came to the stage. Their difference from early plastic cards is that they have a conventional area where a fare for specific amount of time (15 days, one month) could be written (the unit is a single ride) and an "electronic wallet" which could be charged with any amount of roubles (the unit is Rouble) with an ability to get a discount - the more rides the cheaper a single ride is. Electronic wallet gets unlocked when a fixed period fare expires. Also they have bigger expiration period after not being recharged (3 years).

=== Spain ===
In Spain a travel card called creditrans is used in the city of Bilbao.

=== Sweden ===
In Stockholm, Sweden a travel card is used for the municipal railway systems.

=== Switzerland ===
Public transport in Switzerland is organized in tariff networks, with corresponding passes for use of rail, bus, most boats and some cable cars within the fare network. Travel around the country by public transport is facilitated with the Generalabonnement (GA) and Halbtax for residents and the Swiss Travel Pass for tourists.

=== United Kingdom ===
In the United Kingdom anyone resident in England over the "age of eligibility" and people with certain disabilities travel free on most public buses throughout the country at certain times (typically between 9:30 a.m. to 11:00 p.m. on weekdays and all day on weekends and Bank Holidays) through the English National Concessionary Travel Scheme. Some councils also allow these people to travel free on trains, trams or ferries within their local areas, and/or at other times of the day, and may additionally offer local free travel at a lower age. Similar schemes were introduced in Wales in 2002, in Scotland in April 2006, and later in England. Northern Ireland runs a similar scheme but the age limit is 66.

The "age of eligibility" was 60 until 6 June 2010, but increased over ten years to 65, in line with parallel changes to women's eligibility for state old age pension.

Travel card schemes for general public use are currently operated in the United Kingdom in a number of areas including:

- National Rail rover and ranger
- Greater London (Travelcard and Oyster card)
- Liverpool and Merseyside (MetroCard)
- West Midlands (Swift card)
- South Hampshire (Solent Travelcard)
- Strathclyde (ZoneCard and Roundabout ticket)
- Greater Manchester (System One Travelcards)
- Tyne and Wear (Network One and Pop Card)
- West Yorkshire (MCard)

Travel card schemes are often supplemented or replaced by stored value cards.

== North America ==
=== United States ===
==== Chicago ====
Unlimited Ride passes allow travel on all CTA buses and trains with a 1-Day Fun Pass, or 3-day, 7-day or 30-day unlimited-ride passes. The pass, via Ventra, activates the first time the rider uses it and is good for the number of consecutive days shown on the front of the pass. 1-Day ($10), 3-Day ($20), 7-Day ($33) and 30-Day ($100). Metra also offers monthly unlimited ride passes that vary in price depending on fare zones, as well as a weekend pass via Ventra that offers unlimited rides through all zones at a flat $10.

==== Greyhound ====
Greyhound Lines: As from September 30, 2012, the Discovery Pass is no longer available for purchase. The company is thought to feel that 'board-anytime go-anywhere' passes complicate their new business model of "guaranteed reserved seats".

==== Martha's Vineyard ====
In Martha's Vineyard it is rare to offer an annual pass in addition to passes valid for one, three, seven, or thirty-one days. The cost of an annual pass is $100 for adults and $50 for students. All other types of passes are available at adult prices only.

==== New Orleans ====
On NORTA, both transfers and day passes are available. A transfer may be purchased for 25¢ in addition to the $1.25 base fare (seniors & disabled get it for free although they pay just the $0.40 fare). Day passes can be purchased for $3 when boarding any bus or streetcar. Additionally, passes valid for a 3-day period can be purchased for $9, or for 31 days for $55, at a limited number of locations.

==== New York City ====
On New York City Transit, a one-way fare is currently $3.00 per trip, and allows free transfers between buses and subway. Weekly passes are $36, and monthly passes are $132.

==== Portland Metro Area ====
In the Portland, Oregon area there are multiple TriMet day pass options. Prices range from $2–$5 for anywhere all day with as many transfers as one wants. There are also 7, 14, and 30-day passes (which range from roughly $7–$100). There are student discounts and "honored citizen" AKA 65+ discount as well.

==== San Francisco ====
CityPASS Muni and Cable Car 7-day Passport tickets include unlimited transportation on Muni for seven consecutive days beginning day of first CityPASS use.

==== Seattle region ====
Sound Transit, Everett Transit, Community Transit, King County Metro, Pierce Transit and Kitsap Transit offer free transfers via the ORCA Card only, and these transfers are good for two hours after the user taps the card against the reader. When using ORCA, users get full credit for the fare paid on the original trip on any trip on any of the mentioned systems. Kitsap Transit, King County Metro and Pierce Transit also issue paper transfers. These transfers are valid only on the system which issued them. Commuter rail and light rail tickets are valid for one trip only, and no free paper transfers to or from rail are issued or accepted. The agency also issues universal passes, which can be loaded onto the user's ORCA card. Also, ORCA also provides services to organizations wishing to purchase transit services on behalf of their employees or students.

==== Washington, D.C. area ====
While fares for individual trips vary, the Washington Metropolitan Area Transit Authority offers various passes for riding Metrobus and Metrorail. Unlimited passes are applicable for Metrorail and Metrobus service. A seven-day pass for unlimited rides is $60.75, and a "short-trip" (up to $4.50 for Metrorail or $2.50 for Metrobus Express Routes) is $40.50. A one-day unlimited pass is available for $13.50. A 7 day Metrobus pass is available for $13.50 at regular fare (up to $2.25) for several bus services, but it cannot be used on Metrorail.

Riders of Metrorail and Metrobus can transfer between the two services using a SmarTrip card for free within a two hour period, excluding express routes. Those transferring between any two Metrorail lines can change trains without exiting the faregate, thereby incurring no additional fare or requiring a transfer slip.

Transfers are honored both ways between Metrobus and Montgomery County's Ride-on bus service. Ride-on accepts transfers from Metrorail for an additional 35¢ (waived for senior citizens), but there are no transfers from Ride-on buses to Metrorail.

Transit Link cards exist for MARC, VRE, and MTA Commuter Buses. They also provide unlimited Metrorail and Metrobus rides, though additional fare may be charged for express buses. Its cost is based on fare zones.

For $102 more than the price of a MARC train monthly ticket, a Transit Link Card granting unlimited Metrorail and Metrobus trips for the month of the MARC ticket can be purchased. MARC monthly passes are also honored as fare payment for all Maryland Transit Administration bus, Metro and Light Rail services in the Baltimore area at no extra cost.

The Maryland Transit Administration within the Baltimore area generally charges $1.70 for a single trip on one local bus or train. The agency abolished transfers in 1996 in favor of day passes, which at the time were $3.00 and are currently $4.00. Those taking multi-bus/train trips are encouraged to purchase day passes, which at regular fare, are the cost of two one-way trips plus 30¢. Weekly and monthly passes are also available, and all such passes since 2005 have been called "GO-passes." The only transfers that are allowed in the system without additional fare payment are between the various lines of the light rail.

=== Canada ===
==== Toronto ====
The Toronto Transit Commission offers free 2-hour transfers with all base fares. Transfers may be used only on lines connecting to the one from which the transfer was obtained. Also, passengers can pay with a Presto card which may offer a discount in fare.

==== Vancouver ====
TransLink offers several types of fare cards priced by the number of zones the user will be in. As of January 2024, monthly passes are priced at approximately $105 for 1 Zone, $140 for 2 Zones, and $190 for three zones. Concession passes are also available to youth, seniors, and HandyCard holders. A single fare is valid for 90 minutes on bus, SkyTrain, SeaBus, and HandyDART.

In 2013, TransLink started the transition to Compass card, which provides similar benefits in a reusable, stored value card.

==== Winnipeg ====
With the purchase of any single fare, Winnipeg Transit offers free transfers that are valid for 75 minutes from the time of issuance and can be used on any regular bus route for travel in any direction, including return trips. The agency also offers 24-hour, 5-day, 7-day, 28-day, and monthly paper passes are sold at select partner stores, and these same passes are also available on the Peggo card system.

== See also ==
- Free travel pass
- Integrated ticketing
- List of public transport smart cards
- Multimodal transport
- Smart card
