= DB Vertrieb =

German transport company

DB Vertrieb GmbH
- Company type: Limited liability company (Gesellschaft mit beschränkter Haftung)
- Industry: Personenverkehr/Sales
- Founded: 2005
- Headquarters: Frankfurt, Germany
- Key people: Georg Lauber (Vorsitzender); Nils Hartgen (Vertrieb Fernverkehr); Carmen Parrino (Vertrieb Nahverkehr); Thomas Herrmann (Personal)
- Number of employees: 5 800
- Parent: Deutsche Bahn
- Website: db-vertrieb.com

DB Vertrieb GmbH, based in Frankfurt, is a wholly owned subsidiary of Deutsche Bahn AG. It originated 2005 from the DB passenger traffic GmbH.

== Activities ==
DB Vertrieb GmbH is responsible for the distribution systems and distribution infrastructure in the DB Group. Its tasks include the development of commercial and customer-oriented sales structures, training and information of sales as well as revenue accounting and sales controlling. The operative sales are controlled by a sales channel management with the head office in Frankfurt am Main and three regional sales lines north-east (Hamburg, Berlin), west (Cologne, Frankfurt am Main) and south (Stuttgart, Munich).

The sales channel concept aligns the sales organization to the different needs of its customers. The eight distribution channels of the railway are travel center/sales mobile, mobility center, ticket machine, Internet, travel agency with DB license, sale on the train, subscription center and call center.

The call centers are operated by the subsidiary DB Dialog GmbH.
