= Gaspreisbremse =

Planned gas subsidy in Germany

The Gaspreisbremse is a planned subsidy scheme in Germany that pays consumers' gas bills beyond a certain threshold, thereby capping the consumer gas price. Government plans set out a 12ct/kWh cap for households and small companies, and a 7ct cap for large consumers, as of November 2022. The scheme is to be introduced in early 2023.
