= ForYouAwards =

French award

- Awarded for: Influential social media personalities
- Sponsored by: YouTube, Meetic, Brut
- Country: France
- First award: September 19, 2022
- Website: https://www.foryouawards.com/

The ForYouAwards are French awards, launched in 2022 by Sleeq and Le Guide Ultime to honour French-speaking content creators.

== List of ceremonies ==
#	Date	Location
2022	19 September 2022	Théâtre du Chatelet, Paris

== Awards ==
Year	Food	Humour	Fiction	Lifestyle	Academy	Danse	Sport	Music	Beauty	Fashion	Duo	Entertainment	Shorts (YouTube Shorts)	Award from the public	ForYou d'Or
2022	FastGoodCuisine (France)	Cyril Schr (France)	Antton Racca (France)	Rose Thr (France)	Monsieur Astuces (France)	Théma Yorou (Benin)	Yoanna Freestyle (France)	Morgan Offmusic (France)	Rose Lucyy (France)	Cassandra Cano (France)	Nicocapone Comedy (Swiss)	Benoit Chevalier (France)	Lenna Vivas (France)	Fleur Fratacci (France)	Léna Situations (France); Squeezie (France)

== See also ==
- About You Awards
