= Animal Husbandry Labelling (Germany) =

Tierhaltungskennzeichnungsgesetz - TierHaltKennzG (Act on Animal Husbandry Labelling)

Bundestag
- Long title: Gesetz zur Kennzeichnung von Lebensmitteln mit der Haltungsform der Tiere, von denen die Lebensmittel gewonnen wurden
- Territorial extent: Germany
- Enacted by: Bundestag
- Enacted: 16 June 2023
- Assented to by: Bundesrat
- Assented to: 7 July 2023
- Signed by: President of Germany
- Signed: 17 August 2023
- Effective: 24 August 2023
- Committee responsible: Ausschuss für Ernährung und Landwirtschaft
- Status: In force

The label is a black and white rectangle with rounded corners.

Animal Husbandry Labelling (German: Tierhaltungskennzeichnung) is the mandatory labelling of the living conditions of livestock animals originating in Germany. It is in force for pigs during their fattening period since August 2023. The law (federal Act on Animal Husbandry Labelling) was developed by the Greens-led German ministry of agriculture, BMEL, under Cem Özdemir.

== Label ==
The labelling Act, which follows the cabinet draft, stipulates that only animal products need to be labelled that both originate in Germany and are also sold in Germany. Labelling is to be phased in gradually, starting with pig meat.

The label only describes the animals' living conditions during their "productive period". For pig meat, this refers to the fattening period, and ignores living conditions during piglet and sow rearing. The label distinguishes the following five living conditions (from best to worst):

- EU organic certified,
- Outdoor runs/free-range,
- Indoor with fresh air,
- Indoor+space,
- Indoor housing.

== Criticism ==
Requiring a label only from German producers disadvantages them compared to foreign ones selling in Germany, Peter Hauk of the Christian Democrat opposition argued during the Bundesrat discussion of the cabinet draft. The Bundesrat demanded that foreign producers also be forced to use the label.

However, forcing the label on foreign producers would violate European Union and World Trade Organization law. The planned label can be used voluntarily by foreign producers.

== See also ==
- Animal welfare labelling
