= Egg marking =

Form of egg labeling

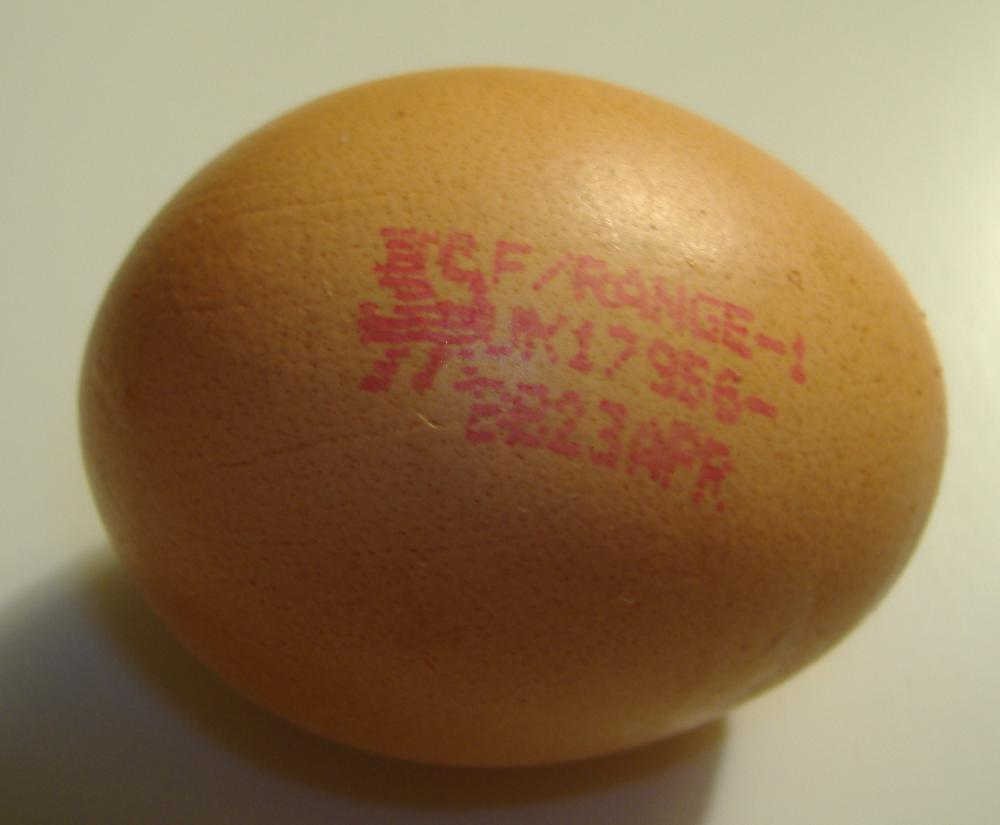
Egg marking on free-range eggs in the United Kingdom (code 1UK)

Egg marking is a form of egg labelling that includes an egg code printed on the egg itself. In the EU there is a producer code regulated by law since 2004. It allows consumers to distinguish free range eggs and organic farming eggs from the industrial caged hen production.

== Egg mark contents ==
An egg mark may contain a number of information parts - in the EU only the producer code is required. Additional information may be printed along with the date of production being the most common to find. Other information may contain the method of production especially in the non-EU world where the numbered levels do not apply.

Note that egg labelling is used worldwide but mostly in the form of egg carton labels. In most countries there are legal definitions on the designation of the egg size, production method, packager identification and best-before dates. As there is more space on the carton there has been no tendency to create an egg code that is seen on the stamps used for egg marking.

== Producer code ==
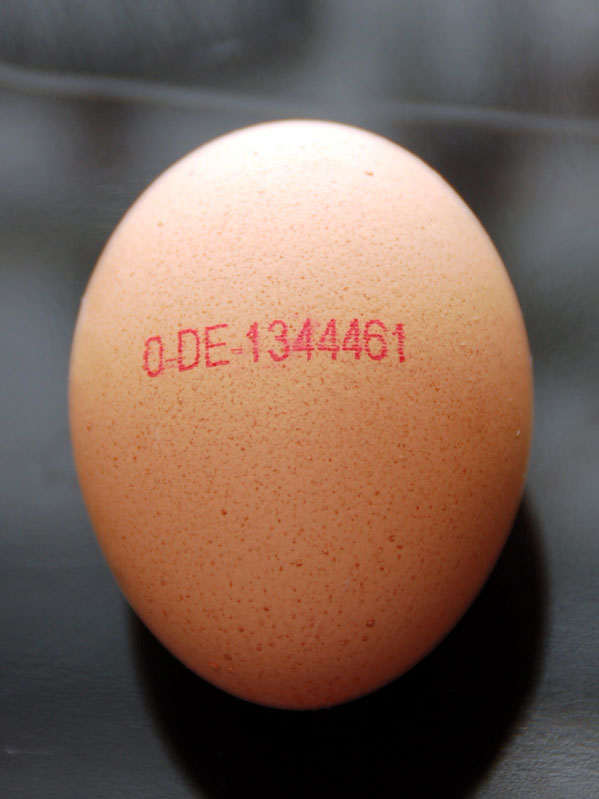
German organic eggs with only the EU egg code

The European Union has defined an egg code that consists of

- a number indicating the method of production
- a two letter code for the country of origin
- a registration number indicating the hen laying establishment

The egg stamp is required in the EU on all class A eggs unless these are sold directly on the farm.

=== Method of production ===
The first number of the egg code defines four methods of hens raising:

0, organic egg production
1, free-range eggs
2, deep litter indoor housing
3, cage farming

Each raising method has different requirements defined.

In the European Union these levels have strict minimum requirements:

- caged: this had a requirement of 550 cm² minimum space per hen. However the EU has banned battery cages by 2012 through an update of EC Directive 1999/74/EC. The new minimum is 750 cm² in furnished cages.
- indoor: the minimum space per hen is increased to 1100 cm² (or 9 hens per square meter). No cages are allowed and instead the hens may sit on an elevated porch in large barn that has a floor covered with sawdust or better.
- free-range: in addition to the barn (with 1100 cm² indoor space per hen) there must be an outdoor space for the hens with continuous daytime access. There is a minimum of 4 m² of outdoor space per hen.
- organic: the indoor space is increased to 1667 cm² (or 6 hens per square meter); the available outdoor space has a minimum of 4 m² with grown pasture for the poultry, and the remaining food must come from organic production.

Some countries had banned battery cages before the EU regulation was enacted, for example in Austria by 2009 and in Germany by 2010. A number of countries have later adopted regulations to completely ban cage farming (including the furnished cage option), for example Switzerland, Germany and the UK with a transition period to 2025.

=== Country code ===
The country code follows the ISO two-letter country codes (also known from country code top-level domains). This includes

- AT, Austria
- BE, Belgium
- BG, Bulgaria
- CY, Cyprus
- CZ, Czech Republic
- DE, Germany
- DK, Denmark
- EE, Estonia
- ES, Spain
- FI, Finland
- FR, France
- EL, Greece
- HR, Croatia
- HU, Hungary
- IE, Ireland
- IT, Italy
- LT, Lithuania
- LU, Luxembourg
- LV, Latvia
- MT, Malta
- NL, Netherlands
- PL, Poland
- PT, Portugal
- RO, Romania
- SE, Sweden
- SI, Slovenia
- SK, Slovakia
- UK, United Kingdom

=== Registration number ===
In most countries the registration number starts with a region code where the egg production facilities are situated:

- Germany - 01 Schleswig-Holstein, 02 Hamburg, 03 Lower Saxony, 04 Bremen, 05 North Rhine-Westphalia, 06 Hesse, 07 Rhineland-Palatinate, 08 Baden-Württemberg, 09 Bavaria, 11 Berlin, 12 Brandenburg, 13 Mecklenburg-West Pomerania, 14 Saxony, 15 Saxony-Anhalt, 16 Thuringia
- Austria - 1 Burgenland, 2 Carinthia, 3 Lower Austria, 4 Upper Austria, 5 Salzburg, 6 Styria, 7 Tyrol, 8 Vorarlberg, 9 Vienna

Note that a producer with multiple barns will have to register each barn separately.

== Criticism ==
Area per hen depending on the first digit of the egg marking. Code 1 and 0 need 4 m^{2} of outdoor space per hen.

There have been multiple occurrences of the producer code being forged: a common strategy is to have multiple barns on the same farm, with some having caged hen production and others with organic production. Eggs are then quietly moved from a caged barn to an organic one, resulting in a superior egg code that commands a higher price on the market. In Lower Saxony (Germany), the state attorney prosecutes around 150 farmers per year.

Marking organic egg production as level 0 might imply that there is nothing better. However it does not necessarily indicate sustainable agriculture, where hens are fed exclusively from organic farming. Also, species-appropriate husbandry would require more space per hen or a lower number of hens per barn (or even have a rooster around to suppress quarrels). In fact, there are superior organic farming standards (e.g. Demeter or Bioland) that cannot be expressed in the current egg code system. Between levels 1 and 0, the difference in space per animal is limited.

Furthermore, egg marking says nothing about other egg production conditions that are frequently criticized by animal advocates, such as the mass killing of male chicks and the painful trimming of hens' beaks.

== See also ==
- Organic certification – organic products must bear a registration number that allows to trace back the ingredients.
- Bio mit Gesicht – additional producer mark in organic farming with a database to show the farm
- Free range standards development across the world
