= Deutschlandticket =

Public transport ticket in Germany

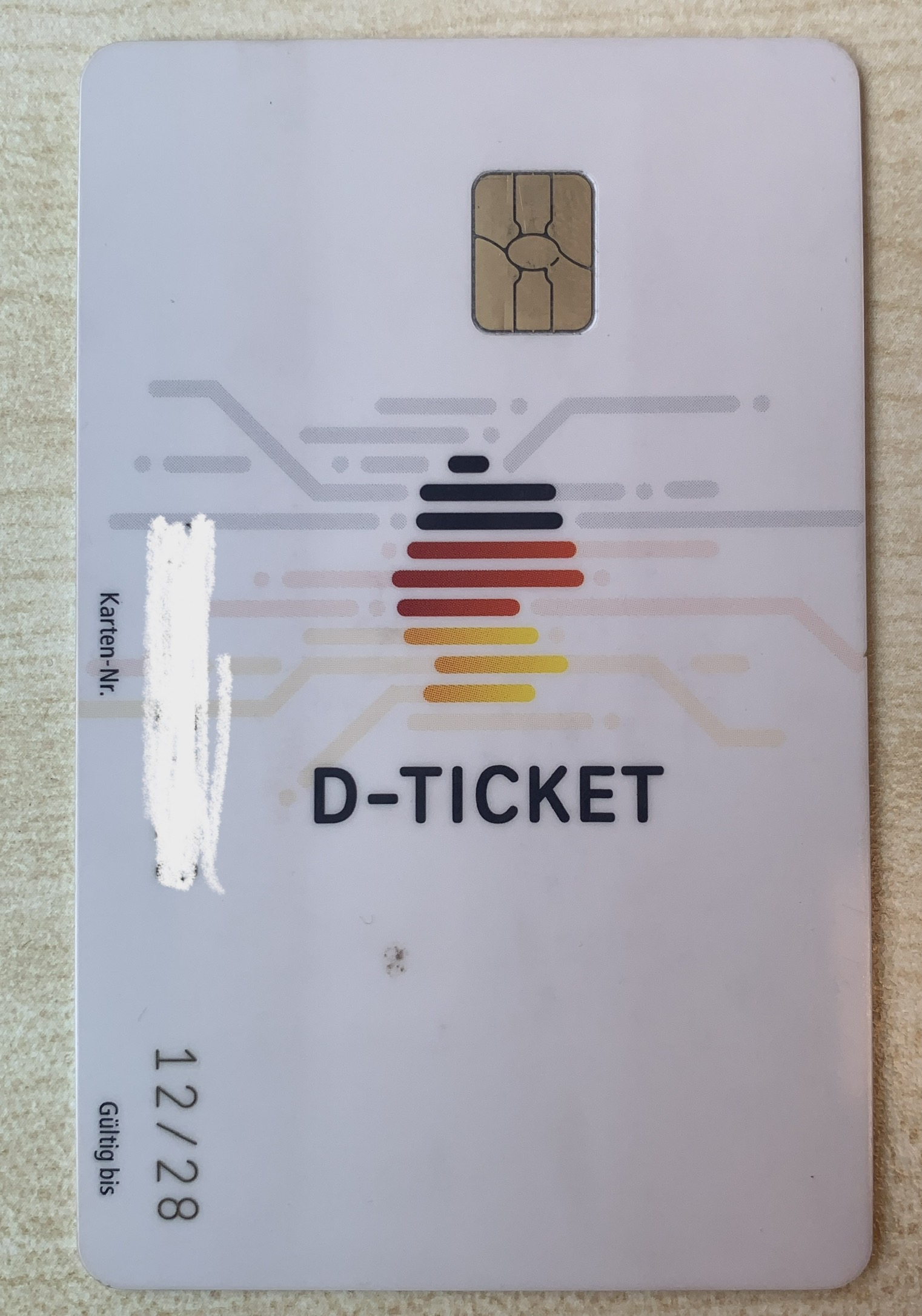
- Inception: 31 March 2023
- Website: https://deutschlandticket.de/, https://www.d-ticket.info/, https://int.bahn.de/en/offers/regional/deutschland-ticket, https://www.deutschlandticket-verkaeufer.de/

The Deutschlandticket, also known as the D-Ticket, is a monthly ticket for local and regional public transport in Germany. It is valid nationwide and allows unlimited travel on participating services. The ticket may either be an electronic ticket on a chipcard or an Aztec code in a mobile app; paper tickets are not issued. All Deutschlandtickets are personalised and only valid together with an official identity document.

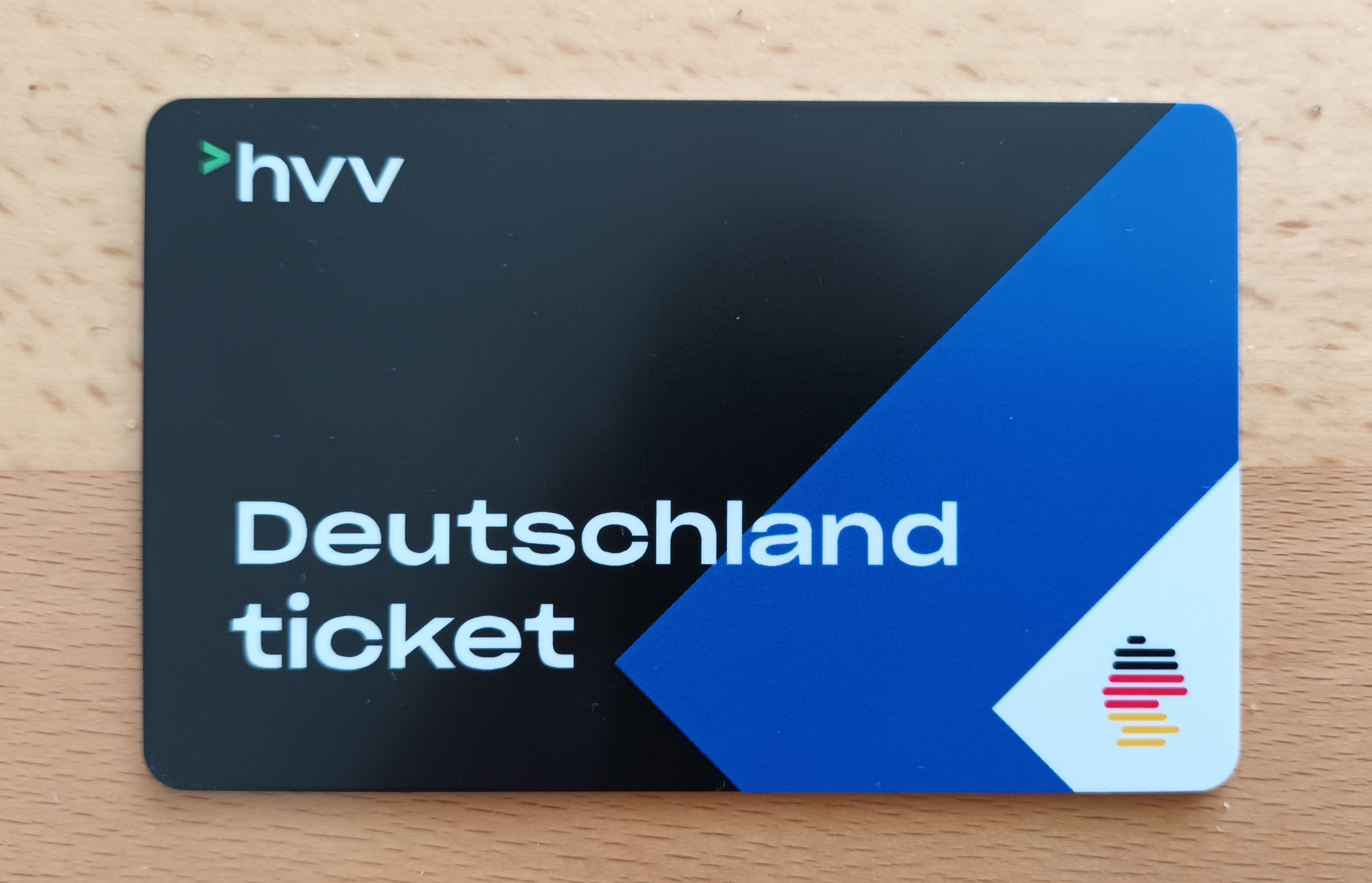
Deutschlandticket chip card issued by the HVV.

The ticket launched in May 2023, following the nationwide 9-Euro-Ticket scheme used in summer 2022. The federal government (Bund) and the federal states (Länder) jointly fund the ticket and contribute a combined €3 billion per year until 2025. About 14.5 million tickets are issued per month.

The ticket cost €49 per month at launch. The price increased to €58 in January 2025,, to €63 in January 2026 and to €66.80 by January 1, 2027. The price increases are based on an own specific price index.

== Ticket conditions ==
=== Validity ===
The Deutschlandticket is valid nationwide on local and regional public transport, including:

- local and regional buses
- trams
- metros (U-Bahn)
- S-Bahn services
- regional trains (RB and RE)

The ticket is not valid on most long-distance services, including:

- Intercity Express (ICE)
- Intercity (IC)
- EuroCity (EC)
- long-distance coaches (for example Flixbus)

Some cities and federal states subsidise specific long-distance routes. On those routes, the Deutschlandticket is valid despite the general exclusion of long-distance services.

The ticket is also accepted on selected cross-border services to nearby border stations, including:

- Denmark: Tønder
- France: Wissembourg
- Netherlands: Hengelo via Oldenzaal, Enschede, and Venlo
- Switzerland: Basel, Schaffhausen
- Poland: Świnoujście, Zgorzelec
- Austria: Salzburg, Kufstein and Außerfernbahn

=== Travel conditions ===
The Deutschlandticket is valid only in second class. First-class upgrades may be available on certain services.

Children under six travel free of charge. Older children require their own ticket.

Rules for pets and bicycles vary by operator. Some operators require a separate ticket for these items.

The Deutschlandticket is personalised and only valid together with an official identity document.

=== Ticket format and issuers ===
The Deutschlandticket is issued exclusively in digital form and is available as:

- Mobile ticket via transport authority applications or electronic wallet
- Smartcard using the eTicket Deutschland standard

Paper tickets are not issued.

There is no single central issuing body. Instead, the ticket is issued by all public transport authorities, most train-operating companies and many bus operators.

=== Sales and pricing ===
The Deutschlandticket is sold as a monthly subscription only. It is valid for one calendar month and renews automatically.

The price was €49 until December 2024 and €58 until December 2025. From January 2026 it costs €63 per month and €66.80 by January 1, 2027. The price increases are based on an own specific price index.

Payment is accepted by SEPA direct debit or credit card. Cancellation is possible until the 10th day of each month. Subscriptions started after that date require payment for both the current and the following month.

The ticket is sold by participating transport authorities. Employers and universities may offer discounted versions, for example as a supplement to the Semesterticket.

The BahnCard 100 includes a Deutschlandticket.

=== Social discount ===
Social-discount prices for the Deutschlandticket (per month, January 2025): Up to €20 €21–€30 €31–€40 Over €40

As of 2025, more than 30 municipalities subsidise the ticket, mainly for welfare recipients or asylum seekers. Prices range from €15 in Würzburg to €53 in Magdeburg. The states of Hamburg, Hesse, and North Rhine-Westphalia also provide discounts. More than 200 other local and regional welfare tickets remain in use.

=== Payment issues for non-eurozone users ===
SEPA direct debit may fail for users outside the eurozone. Some banks, including banks in the Czech Republic and Sweden, do not support euro-denominated debits by default. Failed payments can leave subscriptions active while cancellation requests remain unprocessed, leading to unpaid charges that may later be pursued by DB Vertrieb.

== History ==
After the start of the Russian invasion of Ukraine, energy prices in Germany rose significantly. In response, the government introduced the heavily subsidized 9-Euro-Ticket, which allowed unlimited use of public local transport across Germany at a cost of 9 euros per calendar month. It was available for June, July, and August 2022. After the end of this 3-month period, politicians called for a permanent successor ticket that would offer similar simplicity, though there was debate about the price.

At the end of November 2022, transport ministers reaffirmed their commitment to the monthly ticket for 49 euros, and it was planned to start in April 2023, as a start in January was considered too early for implementation. The start was delayed further by one month as there was opposition from the local and regional transportation services like the Munich MVV that wanted more funding from the federal and the state governments.

On 31 March 2023, the Bundesrat approved the bill passed by the Bundestag for a nationwide ticket for local and regional public transport at a monthly price of 49 euros. The monthly tickets started in May 2023, but could only be purchased by subscription. There are no paper tickets for the subscription – with the possible exception at the start-up phase; users have to authenticate digitally (either via smartphone app or chip card).

The ticket price is to be adjusted in line with inflation each year.

On 31 July 2023, three months after the introduction of the Deutschlandticket, the Ministry of Transport reported that 11 million people had subscribed to the ticket, with 5 million being existing subscribers to monthly transport passes, 5 million new subscribers from existing public transport ticket holders and one million new users of public transport. On 13 September, the Hamburg transport agency reported that it had sold over a million subscriptions.

Since the summer of 2023, Federal Transport Minister Volker Wissing (FDP) had been arguing with federal states about the financing of the ticket, which is unclear. Both sides have so far contributed 1.5 billion euros annually. If there is not enough money, the federal and state governments currently share the additional costs. The federal government rejects further financial commitments from 2024.

At the beginning of December 2023, Stendal district decided that the ticket would no longer be valid on its buses from January 1, 2024, so that the Deutschlandticket would no longer be universally valid; however, the district council reversed its decision two weeks later.

By early 2026, about 14.5 million tickets were issued per month.

== Interest outside Germany ==
Due to the popularity and interest in the Deutschlandticket in Germany, other countries have expressed interest in introducing similar schemes.

=== Portugal ===
On 30 June 2023, influenced by Deutschlandticket, the eco-socialist LIVRE party proposed a monthly rail pass for the regional trains by the state-owned rail operator Comboios de Portugal in the country's annual budget. The proposal passed in parliament, and the Portuguese government said it was introducing a 49 euros per month regional rail pass called the Passe Ferroviário Nacional (National Train Pass) from 1 August 2023. It would allow unlimited travel on all regional trains, known as comboios regionais apart from the tourist trains like the “Comboio Histórico do Douro”, and suburban rail services in Lisbon, Porto and Coimbra.

Critics have said that the pass has little value due to the rules and exclusions of the pass, the fact there are few rail services in the middle of the country, and the frequent strikes by rail workers.

=== France ===
On 9 June 2023, German federal transport minister Volker Wissing said in an interview with Berliner Morgenpost, that he was talking to his French counterpart Clément Beaune about the scheme in a meeting between the two ministers during a discussion about a Franco-German student travel scheme.

In an interview with French YouTuber Hugo Travers on 4 September 2023, French president Emmanuel Macron said his government is looking at a French equivalent of the Deutschlandticket. Later that week on 7 September, on France 2's breakfast programme Télématin, Beaune said the transport ministry was provisionally working on a similar scheme called "Pass Rail" which would come in the summer of 2024. The ticket would allow unlimited travel throughout France on the country's regional trains, the TERs and the regular Intercités for 49 euros per month. Beaune said the government was talking to local authorities about including local bus and trams as well.

Reactions to the proposal were mixed, with the region of Grand Est being supportive of the idea, while the region of Hauts-de-France was critical particularly over costs, pointing out that the region already subsidises its TER to the tune of 530 million euros. The president of the Île-de-France region Valérie Pécresse said in an interview on France 3 Paris Île-de-France, that the costs for such a scheme would be around 1.8 billion euros for the region, making it unaffordable. Wissing has said he would like to interlink the two schemes, so that persons could use either pass in each other's countries.

On 27 September, Beaune and the presidents of all regions came together in Saint-Malo to begin discussions on financing such a scheme, together with general rail finance such as track fees and rolling stock. It is hoped that such a subscription would be available by the summer of 2024.

=== United Kingdom ===
A report produced for Greenpeace by the Greengauge 21 think tank suggested in 2024 that an unlimited rail card might increase usage of UK trains and reduce the climate impact of fossil–fuel-powered vehicles. The Department for Transport said that the government had no plans to implement such a scheme. There is an English National Concessionary Travel Scheme allowing disabled residents to travel free of charge on local buses throughout England (and elderly passengers after 9:30am only), with comparable schemes in Wales, Scotland and Northern Ireland.
