= 9-Euro-Ticket =

Public transport subsidy in Germany

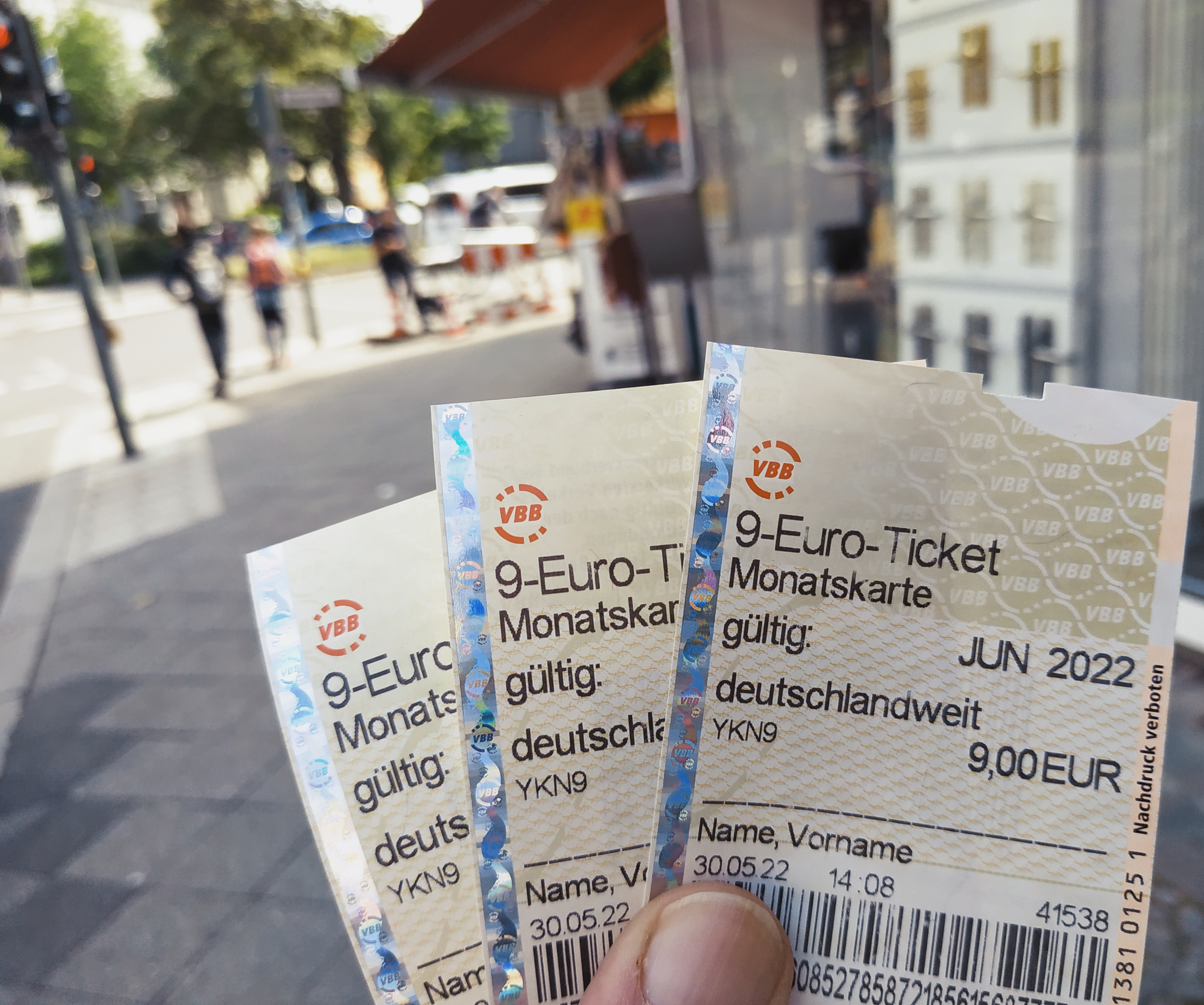
9-Euro-Tickets issued by Verkehrsverbund Berlin-Brandenburg

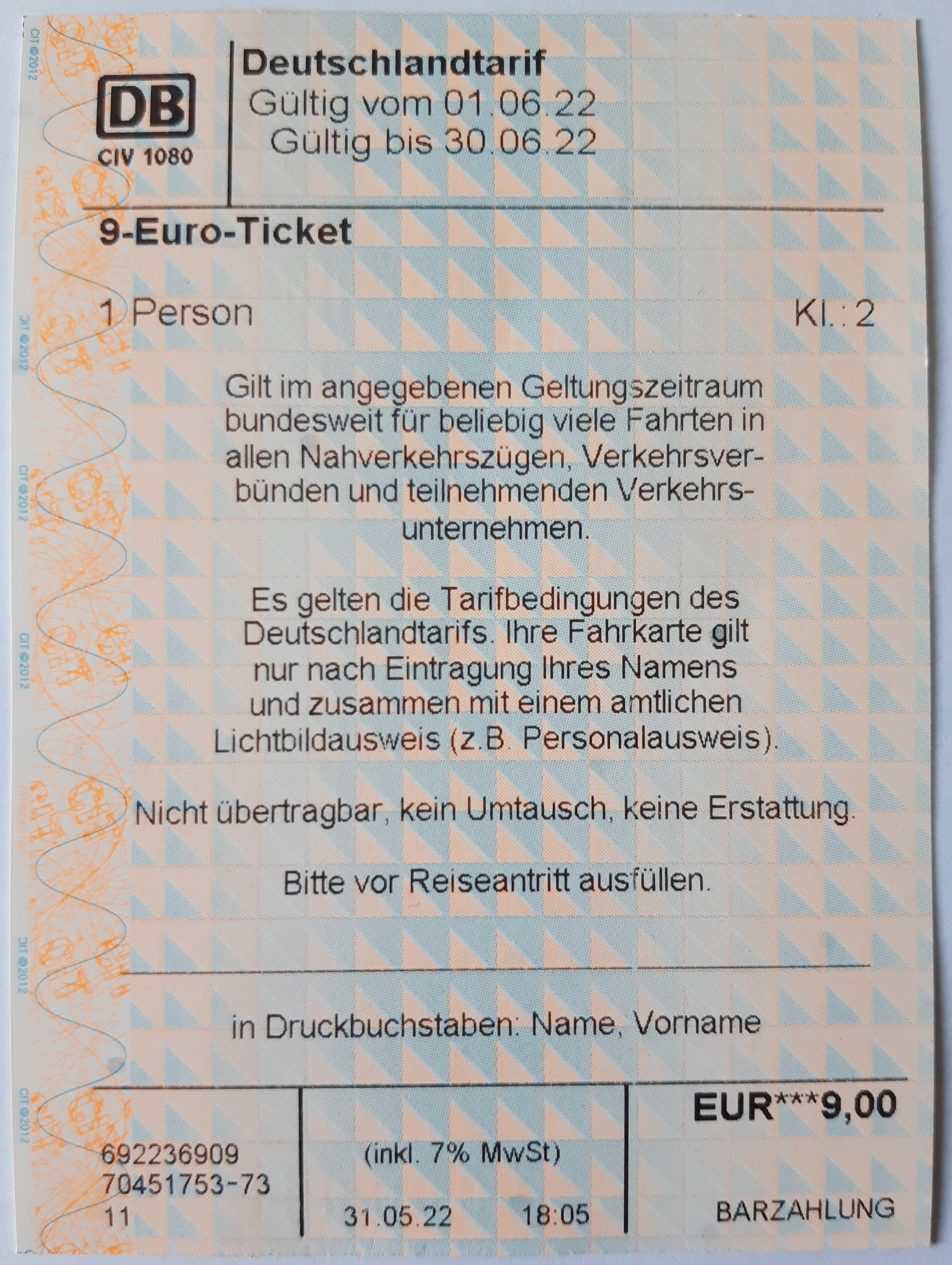
9-Euro-Ticket issued by a Deutsche Bahn ticket vending machine

The 9-Euro-Ticket (German pronunciation: [ˌnɔʏ̯n ˈɔʏ̯ʁo ˈtɪkət]) was a German scheme through which passengers could travel for 9 euros (€) per month on local and regional transport in all of Germany. The tickets were valid for June, July, or August 2022. The offer aimed at reducing energy use amid the 2021–2022 global energy crisis. Another aim was to ease the cost of living crisis.

The 9-euro ticket was valid in the second class, throughout Germany for all local public transport and on regional trains. It did not include travel on Intercity Express (ICE), Intercity (IC) and Eurocity (EC) trains, and could not be used on FlixTrains or intercity buses.

This ticket has been succeeded by the similar but more costly Deutschlandticket.

== Funding ==
The ticket only applied to local and regional transport, which is operated by the states of Germany and municipalities. The German federal government compensated these authorities for their foregone ticket sales. The federal government estimates the cost at 2.5 billion euros.

== Effects on traffic ==
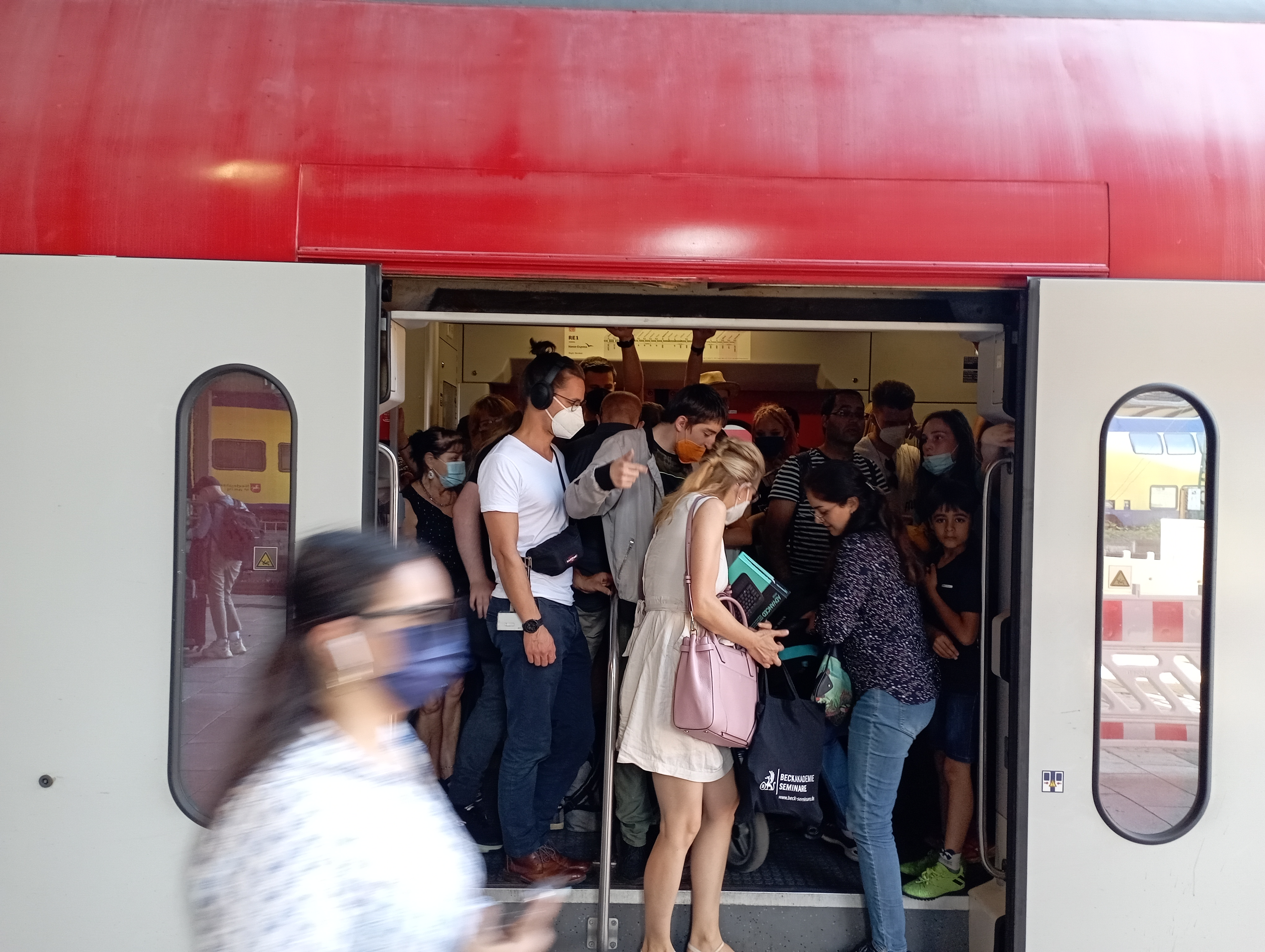
Full train in Hamburg during the 9-Euro-Ticket campaign, 10 August 2022

How the 9-euro ticket affected mobility behavior is the subject of accompanying studies, including the study Mobilität.Leben conducted by the TUM with 1,000 participants in Munich. Interim results for the period from June to mid-July showed that 35% of participants used buses and trains more, while 3% used their cars less. A traffic survey conducted by the city of Munich found that car traffic in Munich decreased by 3 percent from May to June instead of (seasonally) increasing by 3 percent. The TUM study continued for the duration of the 9-euro ticket and for a few weeks after it ended. On 5 September 2022, the study group published its 3rd report (on arXiv).

According to a YouGov online survey of 2,038 participants aged 18 and older, conducted in Germany from 22 to 24 August 2022, 28% had bought a 9-euro ticket at least once and 22% had a subscription to public transportation (which included the 9-euro ticket). 31% of participants said they frequently used the 9-euro ticket on routes they would otherwise have taken by car.

== Other effects ==
Since the cost of passenger transportation is a large part of the basket of goods used to calculate average household spending, this has reduced the increase in the consumer price index.

Many people used the ticket's affordability and ease of travel for leisure getaways – according to some it enabled them to go on vacation for the first time. On the other hand, especially in June, the 9-euro ticket also led to more overcrowded trains and a heavy workload for train and station staff.

The 9-euro ticket was accompanied by a strong increase in excursion tourism by train to rural tourist areas: according to a special analysis by the Federal Statistical Office, trips by rail in June and July of 30 kilometers or more in rural tourist areas were on average 80 percent higher than in the comparable months of 2019. However, there is also another factor: according to the Federal Statistical Office, consumers in Q2 2022 used the lifting of almost all Corona restrictions to travel and go out more again.

According to an estimate of the Association of German Transport Companies (VDV), the 9-Euro-Ticket offer – of which around 52 million tickets were sold in the three months – saved 1.8 million tons of CO_{2}, almost as much as a 130 km/h (81 mph) speed limit on the autobahns would achieve in an entire year.

== Debate and plans about possible successor ==
In August 2022, Alliance 90/The Greens co-leader Ricarda Lang and others proposed a regional ticket for 29 euros and a nationwide ticket for 49 euros a month as successor for the 9-Euro-Ticket after August 2022.

Christian Lindner, the federal finance minister and party leader of the Free Democratic Party (FDP), initially expressed fundamental opposition. While his party colleague, the federal minister for digital and transport Volker Wissing saw the 9-Euro-Ticket as a success, Lindner rejected these low-price tickets also on ideological grounds, calling them part of a "Freebie mentality" (German: Gratismentalität) on Twitter. The Saarland Ministry of Transport criticized Lindner's stance with reference to climate protection targets.

Like the Federal Ministry of Transport, the SPD parliamentary group in the Bundestag is calling for the federal states to contribute to the costs and its vice-chairman Detlef Müller proposed the elimination or reduction of environmentally harmful tax subsidies in the area of road transport as a feasible way to finance the federal share for a successor scheme. Much of the debate focused on the "Dienstwagenprivileg", a €3 billion tax benefit for take-home vehicles, which primarily benefits high earners.

On 31 August, finance minister Lindner also signaled his approval of a successor scheme to the 9-euro ticket on condition that the federal states contribute to the costs.

After a closed-door meeting in Schloss Meseberg, the governing coalition of SPD, Greens and FDP announced in early September that, as part of the planned third relief package, it would also introduce a successor to the 9-euro ticket; the tickets are to cost around 49 to 69 euros a month. The governing coalition wants to make 1.5 billion euros available per year for this, but demands that the federal states contribute at least the same amount.

In May 2023, Germany introduced the Deutschlandticket, a monthly subscription costing 49 euros, as a successor to the 9-Euro-Ticket. While not as inexpensive, the Deutschlandticket aims to encourage public transport use and contribute to climate protection. The program's digital-only subscription model has drawn both praise for its modernization and criticism for accessibility concerns among less tech-savvy users. This transition reflects ongoing debates about sustainable funding and equitable access to public transportation in Germany.

=== 49 euro monthly ticket ===
On 13 October 2022, the transport ministers of the federal states and Federal Transport Minister Wissing announced that they had agreed on a successor ticket dubbed Deutschlandticket, which is expected to be available from January 2023 and cost 49 euros per month. At this time, the financing scheme remained unclear, as the states demanded the federal government to contribute more money.

At the end of November 2022, the transport ministers reaffirmed the commitment to the monthly ticket for 49 euros and it is planned to start in April 2023, an earlier start already in January was considered too timely for implementation. But the planned start has been further delayed by one month as there was still opposition from the local and regional transportation services like the Munich MVV that wanted more refunding from the federal and the state governments.

On 31 March 2023, the Bundesrat approved the bill passed by the Bundestag for a nationwide ticket for local and regional public transportation at a monthly price of 49 euros.

The monthly tickets started in May 2023, but can only be purchased by subscription. There are no traditional paper cards for the subscription – with the possible exception of the start-up phase; the users have to authenticate digitally (either via smartphone app or chip card).

== Berlin successor ==
Berlin offered a €29 ticket for October, November and December 2022. It was only available as part of a one-year subscription, with the right to cancel after three months. The fare reduction (from €86) was paid for by the state of Berlin.

== See also ==
- 365-Euro-Ticket
- Free public transport
