= Press review =

Term in journalism; summary of several press articles (usually the press of the day)

Press review is a summary of several press articles (usually the press of the day or the press of the month).

Press review combines a list of major news of the country or the world into a single newspaper.

== Romania ==
In Romania, it is considered to be fair to copy text from newspapers for press review purposes provided that the text copied must be under 500 symbols and it must be less than half of the source newspaper article. Also, the source must be mentioned.

This restriction was requested by the Romanian Press Club (RPC) which represents many but not all the media outlets in the country, and although it is widely used, it is not legally binding.
