= Lehfeldt =

Lehfeldt is a surname. Notable people with the surname include:

- Elizabeth Lehfeldt (born 1966), American historian
- Franca Lehfeldt (born 1989), German businesswoman, journalist, author, and former television presenter
- Kirsten Lehfeldt (born 1952), Danish actress
- Werner Lehfeldt (born 1943), German Slavist
