= Franca Lehfeldt =

German businesswoman and journalist (born 1989)

- Born: 12 September 1989 (age 36); Hamburg, West Germany
- Education: Castle Neubeuern School
- Alma mater: Glion Institute of Higher Education (BBA); International School of Management (MA)
- Occupations: Businesswoman, journalist, author
- Known for: Journalism
- Spouse: Christian Lindner (m. 2022)

Franca Lehfeldt (born 12 September 1989) is a German businesswoman, journalist, author, and former television presenter. Most-recently she was chief reporter of Die Welt (Axel Springer SE) until her resignation in October 2023 to pursue self-employment. She previously held a variety of positions at RTL Group. Lehfeldt is the wife of Christian Lindner who served as Federal Minister of Finance of Germany until November 2024.

== Early life and education ==
Lehfeldt was born on September 12, 1989 in Hamburg, West-Germany to businessman Claus-Holger Lehfeldt, who was active in the real estate and private equity industry through Lehfeldt GmbH. Her father was born illegitimately through an affair his mother had during the Bombing of Hamburg in 1943. She completed her Abitur at the Castle Neubeuern boarding-school in 2009. She then studied business administration and hotel management at Glion Institute of Higher Education in Glion, Switzerland and graduated with a Bachelor of Business Administration in 2012. She also holds a master's degree in strategic marketing from the International School of Management since 2014.

== Career ==
After completing professional studies at the RTL journalism school, Lehfeldt began to work as a reporter for RTL Group. In April 2021, she was promoted to chief reporter of political magazines. She was employed at infoNetwork GmbH, a subsidiary of RTL, and worked at the headquarters in Berlin, Germany. In 2022, she became chief reporter for Die Welt (Axel Springer SE), a position she held until 2023 when she made public to enter self-employment by founding an agency for communication and marketing.

== Personal life ==
On July 7, 2022, Lehfeldt married Christian Lindner (10 years her elder), on the island of Sylt, Germany. The wedding was attended by several well-known people including Olaf Scholz, Marco Buschmann, Wolfgang Kubicki, and Armin Laschet. The festivities also made headlines for being "on the expenditure of the tax payers", however was entirely financed privately with exception of additional security measures. As of 2023, they reside in Berlin, Germany.

== Literature ==
- Nena Brockhaus, Franca Lehfeldt: Alte weise Männer: Hommage an eine bedrohte Spezies. Gräfe und Unzer, München 2023, ISBN 978-3-8338-8739-0 (in German)
