= Christian Lindner =

German politician (born 1979)

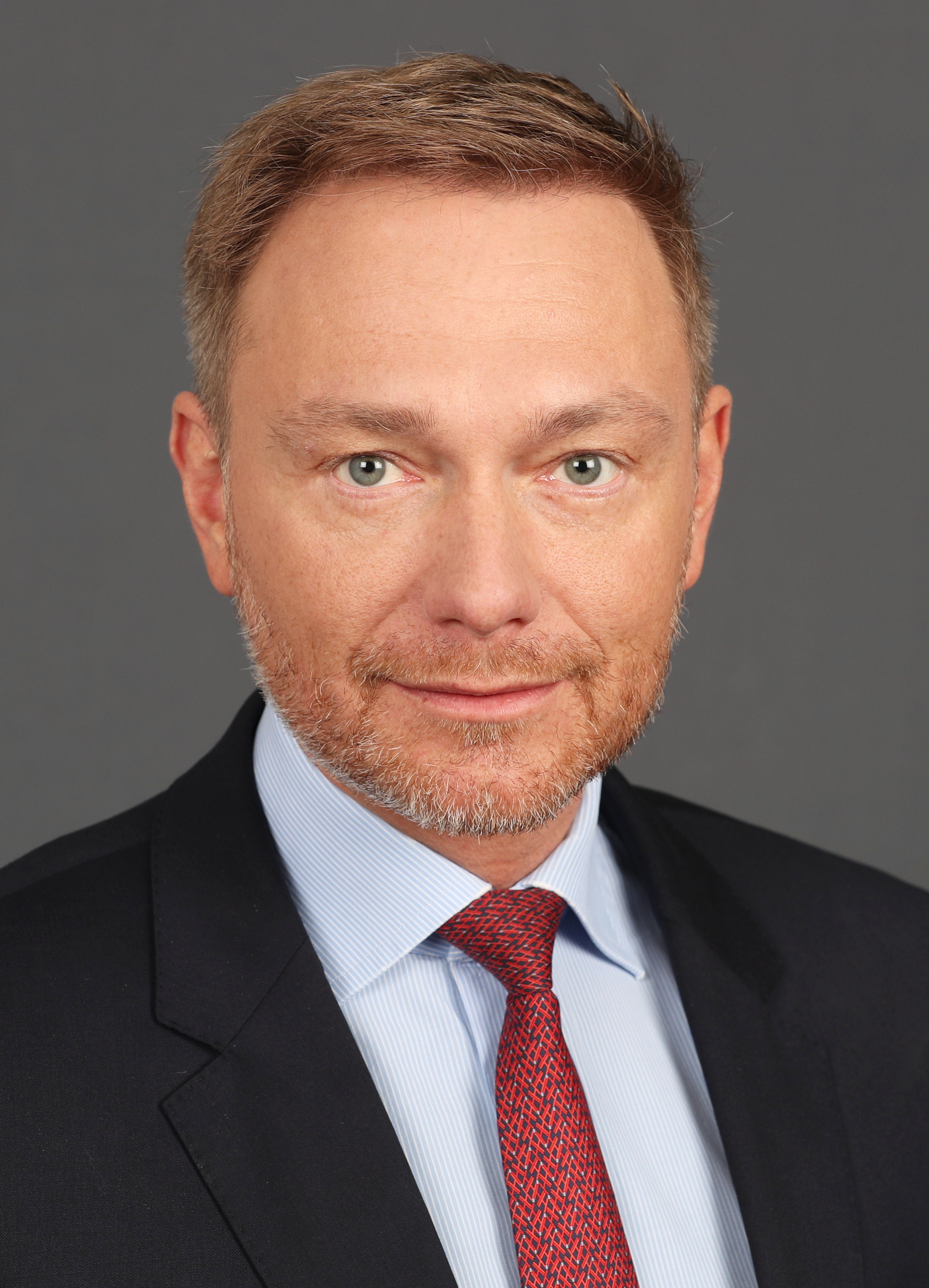
- Official portrait, 2020

Leader of the Free Democratic Party
- In office 7 December 2013 – 16 May 2025
- Deputy: Wolfgang Kubicki; Nicola Beer; Johannes Vogel
- General Secretary: Nicola Beer; Linda Teuteberg; Volker Wissing; Marco Buschmann
- Preceded by: Philipp Rösler
- Succeeded by: Christian Dürr

Minister of Finance
- In office 8 December 2021 – 7 November 2024
- Chancellor: Olaf Scholz
- Preceded by: Olaf Scholz
- Succeeded by: Jörg Kukies
Party political offices
Leader of the Free Democratic Party in the Bundestag
In office 24 October 2017 – 7 December 2021
Chief Whip	Marco Buschmann
Deputy	Katja Suding; Michael Theurer; Stephan Thomae; Alexander Graf Lambsdorff; Christian Dürr; Frank Sitta
Preceded by	Rainer Brüderle (2013)
Succeeded by	Christian Dürr
Leader of the Free Democratic Party in the Landtag of North Rhine-Westphalia
In office 31 May 2012 – 10 October 2017
Preceded by	Gerhard Papke
Succeeded by	Christof Rasche
Leader of the Free Democratic Party in North Rhine-Westphalia
In office 13 May 2012 – 27 November 2017
Preceded by	Daniel Bahr
Succeeded by	Joachim Stamp
General Secretary of the Free Democratic Party
In office 24 December 2009 – 14 December 2011
Leader	Guido Westerwelle; Philipp Rösler
Preceded by	Dirk Niebel
Succeeded by	Patrick Döring
Parliamentary constituencies
Member of the Bundestag for North Rhine-Westphalia
In office 24 October 2017 – 25 March 2025
Preceded by	Multi-member district
Constituency	Free Democratic Party list
In office 27 October 2009 – 10 July 2012
Preceded by	Multi-member district
Succeeded by	Hans-Werner Ehrenberg
Constituency	Free Democratic Party list
Member of the Landtag of North Rhine-Westphalia
In office 31 May 2012 – 10 October 2017
Preceded by	Multi-member district
Succeeded by	Lorenz Deutsch
Constituency	Free Democratic Party list
In office 1 June 2000 – 18 November 2009
Preceded by	Multi-member district
Succeeded by	Ute Dreckmann
Constituency	Free Democratic Party list

Personal details
- Born: Christian Wolfgang Lindner; 7 January 1979 (age 47) Wuppertal, North Rhine-Westphalia, West Germany (current-day Germany)
- Party: FDP (1995–present)
- Spouses: Dagmar Rosenfeld (m. 2011; div. 2020) Franca Lehfeldt (m. 2022)
- Education: University of Bonn (MA)

Military service
- Allegiance: Germany
- Branch/service: Bundeswehr
- Years of service: 2002–present
- Rank: Major
- Unit: German Air Force Reserve

Christian Wolfgang Lindner (German: [ˈkʁɪsti̯an ˈvɔlfɡaŋ ˈlɪndnɐ]; born 7 January 1979) is a German retired politician of the Free Democratic Party (FDP) who was the Federal Minister of Finance from 2021 until his dismissal in 2024 during a government crisis. Serving from 2013 to 2025, Lindner was the longest-serving party-leader of the FDP and a Member of the Bundestag (MdB) for North Rhine-Westphalia from 2017 to 2025, having previously held a seat from 2009 until 2012. Lindner resigned as party leader and announced his retirement from active politics after the FDP dropped out of parliament as a result of the 2025 federal election. His dismissal from the Scholz cabinet is often considered the main catalyst for the party's inability to enter the Bundestag in the election.

== Early life and education ==
Christian Lindner was born in Wuppertal, West Germany. His father Wolfgang Lindner is a teacher of mathematics and computer science at the Städtisches Gymnasium in Wermelskirchen.

After graduating from Gymnasium in 1998 and an alternative civilian service, Christian Lindner studied political science at the University of Bonn from 1999 to 2006. After eleven semesters he acquired the academic degree of Magister Artium (M.A). In his master's thesis at the Institute of Political Science, he dealt with the topic: "Tax competition and revenue sharing. Can the financial constitution be reformed?" In 2006, he began writing his dissertation under supervision from political science professor Frank Decker, which he has so far not completed due to his political activities.

While studying, Lindner became a reserve officer in the German Air Force. In 2002, he was promoted to First Lieutenant (Oberleutnant) in the Reserve. In 2008 he was a liaison officer to the state command Landeskommando of the state of North Rhine-Westphalia in Düsseldorf. Since September 2011 he has held the rank of Captain (Hauptmann) in the Reserve. Currently, Lindner is a Major in the Air Force.

== Early political career ==
Lindner joined the FDP in 1995. He has been a member of the executive board of the FDP in the state of North Rhine-Westphalia since 1998 and became Secretary General in 2004 (until February 2010). At the May 2000 election for the Landtag of North Rhine-Westphalia, the 21-year old Lindner was elected, becoming the youngest MP in the history of the state parliament of North Rhine-Westphalia. Lindner was from 2000 initially 'spokesman for Intergenerational Affairs, Family and Integration' and then from 2005 to 2009 was also vice chairman of the FDP parliamentary group in the parliament and spokesman for Innovation, Science and Technology. In 2007 he also became a member of the federal executive board of the FDP.

From 2009 Lindner was a member of the German Bundestag. In the negotiations to form a coalition government following the 2009 federal elections, he was part of the FDP delegation in the working group on families, integration of immigrants and culture, led by Maria Böhmer and Hans-Joachim Otto.

From December 2009 until his surprise resignation in December 2011, Lindner was also Secretary General of the FDP on federal level, largely under the leadership of party chairman Guido Westerwelle and later under Philipp Rösler when Westerwelle had to resign. Lindner's resignation was caused by an internal party vote which had been forced by a group centered around the Eurosceptic FDP parliamentarian Frank Schäffler to determine the FDP's future course on questions pertaining to the European Stability Mechanism (ESM).

Lindner was later chosen to chair the North Rhine-Westphalian FDP in the 2012 state election of North Rhine-Westphalia, succeeding Daniel Bahr. In the election, the FDP received 8.6% of the vote, surpassing all expectations at the time as the party had been fighting over all the country to reach the minimum representation of 5% for years and was losing representation in several states. Following the party's victory at that election he was elected Parliamentary leader of the FDP in the North Rhine-Westphalian Landtag, succeeding Gerhard Papke on 15 May 2012, and worked in the opposition. In March 2013, he was elected one of Rösler's deputies, alongside Sabine Leutheusser-Schnarrenberger and Holger Zastrow.

== FDP Chairman ==
Lindner was elected the new chairman of the FDP following the resignation of Chairman Philipp Rösler after the 2013 German federal elections in which the FDP failed to clear the 5% hurdle to enter the Bundestag for the first time since 1949.

Ahead of the 2014 European elections, Lindner and Dutch Prime Minister Mark Rutte served as 'mediators' between Olli Rehn and Guy Verhofstadt, the Alliance of Liberals and Democrats for Europe's candidates for the presidency of the European Commission; eventually, the candidates agreed to jointly lead the ALDE's campaign for elections, with Verhofstadt running to succeed José Manuel Barroso. At the time, Lindner was widely regarded to support Rehn.

Lindner was a FDP delegate to the Federal Convention for the purpose of electing the President of Germany in 2017, where he endorsed the government's candidate Frank-Walter Steinmeier. That same year, he led his party's successful campaign for the 2017 state elections of North Rhine-Westphalia, which resulted in the FDP joining the state government of incoming Minister-President Armin Laschet. Lindner himself did not take a position in the new government because of his aim to lead the FDP back to the Bundestag in September 2017.

== Return to the Bundestag ==
In the 2017 German federal election, Lindner led the FDP to achieve a result of 10.7%. After that success he was elected leader of the FDP parliamentary group in the Bundestag.

In October 2017, Angela Merkel's CDU and Katrin Göring-Eckardt's and Cem Özdemir's Greens started negotiations with the FDP to form a government, in which Lindner was widely seen as the future Minister of Finance, as the CDU had even nominated the former Minister Wolfgang Schäuble as President of the Bundestag to make place for the FDP. Such a coalition was the only realistic possibility to form a government (except for a Grand coalition) but had almost never been used before on any regional level in Germany. In November 2017, after midnight, Lindner and his party left the already prolonged negotiations after four unsuccessful weeks, which led to the longest government formation in German history and finally in March 2018 once more to a Grand Coalition with the SPD, which had previously rejected any participation in the new government.

In 2021 Christian Lindner was re-elected federal chairman of the FDP with 93 percent of the vote and at the same time was chosen as the party's top candidate for the federal election.

== Federal Minister of Finance ==
Following the 2021 German federal election, the FDP agreed to enter government with the Greens and Social Democrats, as part of a traffic light coalition led by Olaf Scholz. Lindner was named as Finance Minister, and took office on 8 December 2021.

After the G7 countries announced that they would present strong sanctions against Russia, Lindner stated that they should target Russian oligarchs. He stated: "We are working on further sanctions. I am particularly concerned that the oligarchs should be affected. Those who have profited from Putin and stolen the wealth of the Russian people, including through corruption, should not be allowed to enjoy their prosperity in our Western democracies".

On the night of 24 February 2022, right after Russia started its invasion of Ukraine, Lindner according to the Ambassador of Ukraine in Germany told Ukraine's ambassador Andriy Melnyk that "Ukraine has only a few hours" left, so he opposed arms supplies to Kyiv and Russia's disconnection from SWIFT. On 17 May 2022, Lindner said he is "politically open to the idea of seizing" the frozen foreign-exchange reserves of the Central Bank of Russia —which amount to over $300 billion— to cover the costs of rebuilding Ukraine after the war.

In August 2022, Lindner announced a "big step" to improve anti-money laundering and sanctions enforcement in Germany: he wanted to create a "Federal Financial Criminal Investigation Office" to end the good conditions for money laundering in Germany. The GdP warned of fragmented responsibilities and authorities at federal and state levels; rather, Lindner should strengthen the existing Federal Customs Office. To this day there is no "Federal Financial Criminal Investigation Office". Experts criticize that the new agency lacks the authority to seizure suspicious assets by administrative order and the exclusion of tax-related offences from its jurisdiction, according to a draft published until September 2023.

Lindner has been a staunch defender of the constitutionally-enshrined debt brake and seen as reluctant to agree another suspension in 2024.

In July 2024 Lindner argued that Germany would need to halve its aid to Ukraine. In August 2024 Lindner halted new aid to Ukraine, saying the aid would in future be supplied from the frozen funds in the west of the Russian Central Bank. Robert Habeck, among others, thought that this might stress the ruling coalition, and this had already impacted the promised Diehl IRIS-T system, which turned out not to have been funded by Germany after all because of the restrictions put in place by Lindner.

In September 2024, Lindner agreed with an FDP position paper that proposed cuts to the social benefits for asylum seekers, as well as designating some North African countries as "safe" for ease of repatriation.

On 6 November 2024, Lindner's dismissal was requested by Chancellor Olaf Scholz, citing a loss of trust. On 7 November he was dismissed from office by Federal President Frank-Walter Steinmeier. His removal led to the collapse of the governing coalition, with two other FDP members resigning from their ministries and a third minister leaving the FDP.

== 2025 federal election and retirement ==
Lindner led the FDP in the 2025 German federal election. As expected in the polls, the FDP failed to reach the 5% threshold, resulting in the party failing to secure any seats in the 21st Bundestag. Shortly after the announcement of the projected election results, Lindner announced his retirement from politics and resignation as FDP leader.

== Other activities ==
=== International organizations ===
- European Bank for Reconstruction and Development (EBRD), ex-officio Member of the Board of Governors (2021–2024)
- European Investment Bank (EIB), ex-officio Member of the Board of Governors (2021–2024)
- European Stability Mechanism (ESM), ex-officio Member of the Board of Governors (2021–2024)
- Asian Infrastructure Investment Bank (AIIB), ex-officio Member of the Board of Governors (2021–2024)
- International Monetary Fund (IMF), ex-officio Alternate Member of the Board of Governors (2021–2024)

=== Corporate boards ===
- Börse Stuttgart, Member of the Advisory Board (since 2026)
- Serviceplan Group, Member of the Supervisory Board (since 2026)
- Lhoist, Member of the Supervisory Board (since 2025)
- Hagedorn, Member of the Advisory Board (since 2025)
- KfW, Ex-Officio Member of the Board of Supervisory Directors (2021–2024)
- RAG-Stiftung, Ex-Officio Member of the Board of Trustees (2021–2024)

=== Non-profit organizations ===
- Borussia Dortmund, Member of the Business Advisory Board (since 2018)
- Aktive Bürgerschaft, Member of the Board of Trustees
- Friedrich Naumann Foundation, Member of the Board of Trustees
- ZDF, Member of the Television Board
- Heinrich Heine University (HHU), Institut für Deutsches und Internationales Parteienrecht und Parteienforschung, Member of the Board of Trustees
- Deutsche AIDS-Stiftung, Member of the Board of Trustees
- Walther Rathenau Institute, Member of the Advisory Board
- Deutsche Nationalstiftung, Member of the Senate
- NRW Foundation, Member of the Board of Trustees
- Rotary International, Member

== Political positions ==
=== Foreign policy ===
In 2022, Lindner called for renewed talks over a free trade agreement between the European Union and the United States, aiming to revive discussions on the so-called Transatlantic Trade and Investment Partnership (TTIP).

=== Entrepreneurship ===
In early 2015, an impassioned response to heckling by Lindner, defending entrepreneurs and startup culture, made it onto newspaper front pages and became one of the most watched political speeches in months. Lindner was speaking before the state legislature in North Rhine-Westphalia about the importance of entrepreneurship and how failed entrepreneurs deserve a second chance when a Social Democratic member in the audience heckled: "That [failure] is something you have experience in." That was a reference to an Internet company co-founded by Lindner that failed after the dot-com bubble burst in the early 2000s. Lindner responded with a 2 1/2-minute speech, saying: "If one succeeds, one ends up in the sights of the Social Democratic redistribution machinery and, if one fails, one can be sure of derision and mockery." He added that this particular member preferred to have a secure job in public service for his entire life, rather than daring to found a company, and how the message of that heckling attempt was the total opposite of what had been announced just minutes earlier by the president of the state legislature, who also happened to be an SPD member.

Bild, the highest-circulation tabloid in Germany, praised Lindner on its front page. The Berlin daily Tagesspiegel said the rant offered a welcome contrast to the "persistent fog of alternative-less Merkelism" that characterized debate in the Bundestag. What they were referring to was the situation that because of the narrow defeats of the FDP and the AfD, the opposition in the Bundestag only included left parties. Many policies of Merkel's government directly came from their center-left coalition partner SPD or were at least negotiated and harmonized with them, and then only left parties reacted on them, who usually criticized those policies as inadequate and advocated for more investment into them or stronger policies, but did not oppose them on a principled basis.

=== Financial policy ===
Shortly after the 2017 elections, Lindner ruled out taking on new debt to manage the balancing act of cutting income taxes and increasing investment on digital infrastructure. He criticized outgoing Finance Minister Wolfgang Schäuble for not being tough enough on Greece and not cutting income taxes for middle-class workers.

=== German farmers' protests ===
Lindner criticised some of the actions taken during the 2023–2024 German farmers' protests, especially after the blockade of Robert Habeck on a ferry.

== Reception ==
US economist Joseph Stiglitz and British economist Adam Tooze criticized Lindner's fiscal positions in 2021, arguing that, if put into practice, they would pose a threat to the economic future of Germany and Europe. They called his positions an "accumulation of conservative clichés" from a "bygone era" that had become obsolete "after three decades of crisis on the financial markets, in geopolitics [and] in the environmental field".

== Personal life ==
In 2011, Lindner married journalist Dagmar Rosenfeld; they had started dating in 2009. On 19 April 2018, they announced their separation. In 2018, he started dating journalist Franca Lehfeldt, whom he married in 2022. Their first child, a daughter, was born in April 2025

== Publications ==
=== Editor ===
- Knüppel, Hartmut (2001). Die Aktie als Marke (in German). Frankfurt am Main: Frankfurter Allgemeine Zeitung, Verl.-Bereich Buch. ISBN 978-3-933180-83-4.
- Lindner, Christian (14 October 2012). Avatare (in German). Springer. ISBN 978-3-642-62397-4.
- Rösler, Philipp; Lindner, Christian (25 March 2009). Freiheit: gefühlt - gedacht - gelebt (in German). Wiesbaden: Springer-Verlag. ISBN 978-3-531-16387-1.

Party political offices
Preceded by Dirk Niebel	Secretary General of the Free Democratic Party; 2009–2011	Succeeded by Patrick Döring
Preceded by Philipp Rösler	Leader of the Free Democratic Party; 2013–present	Incumbent
Political offices
Preceded by Olaf Scholz	Minister of Finance; 2021–2024	Succeeded by Jörg Kukies
