= 2024 German government crisis =

Collapse of German ruling coalition

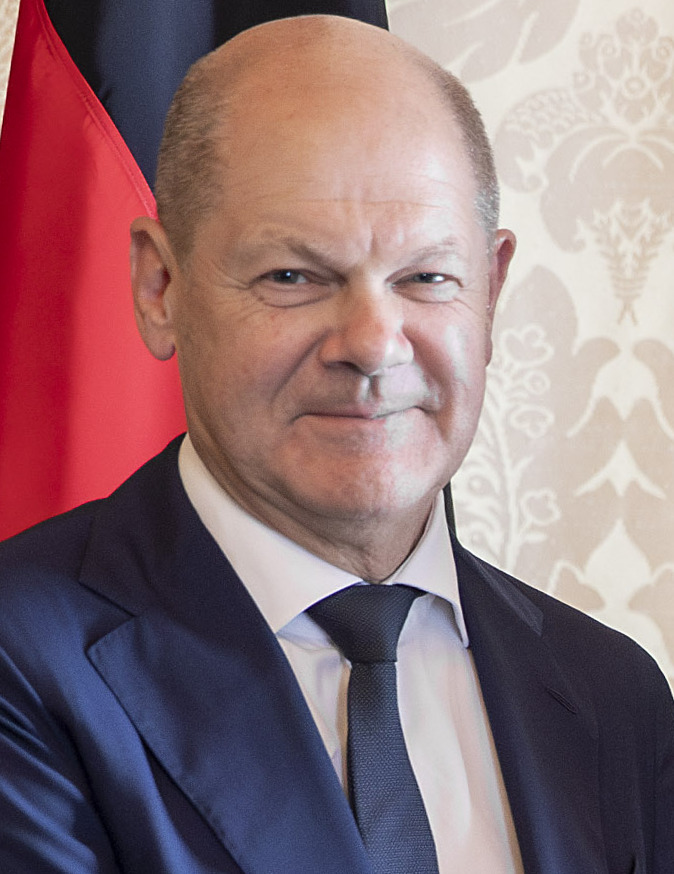
- Olaf Scholz (SPD), Chancellor of Germany and leader of the coalition (2021–2025)
- Date: 6 November 2024 (dismissal of Christian Lindner); 16 December 2024 (motion of confidence)
- Type: Political crisis
- Cause: Disagreements over economic policies resulting in the dismissal of finance minister and FDP leader Christian Lindner
- Participants: Scholz cabinet
- Outcome: Two-party minority government, vote of confidence, and an early federal election

On 6 November 2024, Olaf Scholz, the incumbent chancellor of Germany, announced the dismissal of Christian Lindner, the then-finance minister and leader of the Free Democratic Party (FDP), from his cabinet. This occurred following disputes in the incumbent traffic light coalition government between Scholz's Social Democratic Party (SPD), the FDP and the Greens over the country's economic policies and tensions within the coalition. In response, the FDP withdrew from the government and moved into the opposition, causing the collapse of the coalition and leaving a minority red–green government.

On 16 December 2024, Scholz called and intentionally lost a vote of confidence in the ruling government to trigger a snap election. As a result, an early 2025 federal election was held on 23 February 2025, rather than the originally intended target of autumn in the same year.

== Background ==
=== Formation of the traffic light coalition ===
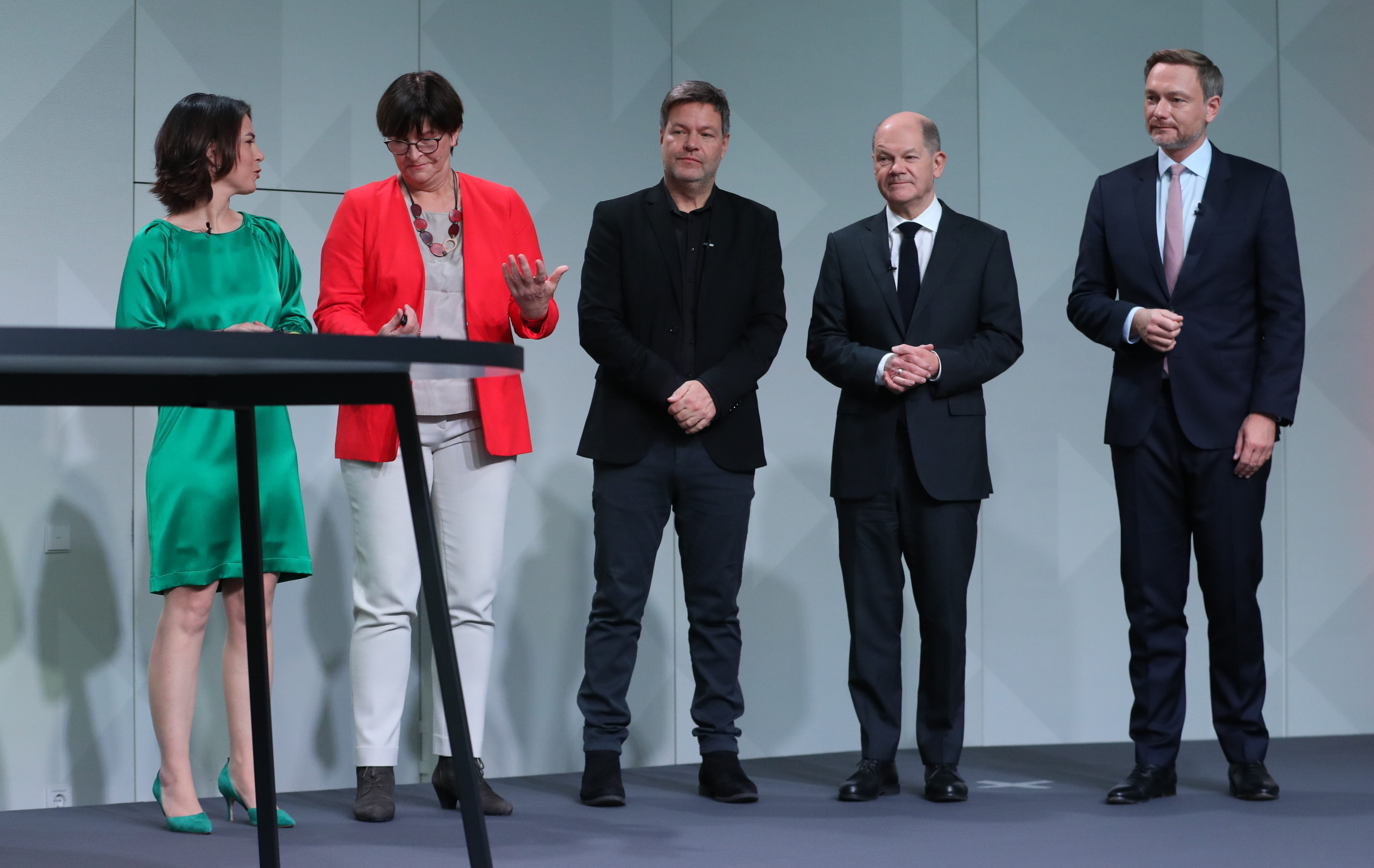
The traffic light coalition between the SPD, The Greens, and the FDP was a first in German history.

The 2021 German federal election resulted in the SPD emerging as the strongest party in the Bundestag, with 25.71% of the vote (206 seats out of 736). The SPD reached an agreement to form a ruling coalition with The Greens (118 seats) and the FDP (91 seats), with SPD leader Olaf Scholz as federal chancellor. The resulting Scholz cabinet was appointed in December 2021. This marked the first time the governing coalition in the Bundestag was a traffic light coalition (Ampelkoalition), named after the colours associated with the three parties: red (SPD), yellow (FDP) and green (Greens).

=== Developing disagreements in the coalition ===
With the SPD and The Greens being considered centre-left and the FDP economically liberal, the ideological differences between the three parties led to challenges in the newly formed government from the start. This showed itself in disagreements in areas such as budget planning, environmentalism or social services, often resulting in gridlocks. Additionally, the country entered an economic crisis while under leadership of the traffic light coalition, leading to falling approval ratings.

In November 2023, Germany's Federal Constitutional Court (Bundesverfassungsgericht) declared parts of the government's budget policy unconstitutional. Scholz's cabinet had reallocated unspent debt proceeds – originally designated to mitigate the COVID-19 pandemic – to its climate action budget. The court ruling left the budget €60 billion short. The government attempted to cover the resulting shortfall through re-allocating already planned funds, but this resulted in the 2023–2024 German farmers' protests and further decreased the public perception of the already unpopular government.

=== State elections in September 2024 ===
In September 2024, three state elections in eastern Germany (Thuringia [1 September], Saxony [1 September] and Brandenburg [22 September]) yielded disastrous results for the parties in the federal traffic light coalition. In Thuringia, the SPD received its worst result in any post-war state election, although it held its vote in Saxony and increased its vote in Brandenburg. The Greens and the FDP performed even worse, losing all their seats in Thuringia and Brandenburg and losing seats in Saxony. In all three states, far-right Alternative for Germany (AfD) and left-populist Sahra Wagenknecht Alliance (BSW) gained large numbers of voters. The bad state election results for the traffic light coalition parties were seen by many as reflecting dissatisfaction with their performance at the federal level.

== Budget discussions in October 2024 ==
In October 2024, Robert Habeck, Minister for Economic Affairs and Climate Action and member of The Greens, proposed a debt-financed fund to promote investment by companies in order to fill the gap in the government's budget. The plan would be irreconcilable with Germany's debt brake (Schuldenbremse), which limits annual structural deficits to 0.35% of GDP.

On 1 November 2024, Lindner issued an 18-page policy paper, calling for a new economic policy for the coalition. Lindner called for halting new regulations, introducing new tax cuts, and cutting public spending, including on action against climate change, in order to solve the country's economic crisis. Lindner's paper was deemed a "provocation" by The Greens and the SPD, who considered his positions incompatible with the coalition agreement. This led to crisis talks in the Chancellery over the continued existence of the coalition, which culminated in a session of coalition representatives, including Scholz, Habeck and Lindner meeting on 6 November.

== Dismissal of Christian Lindner ==
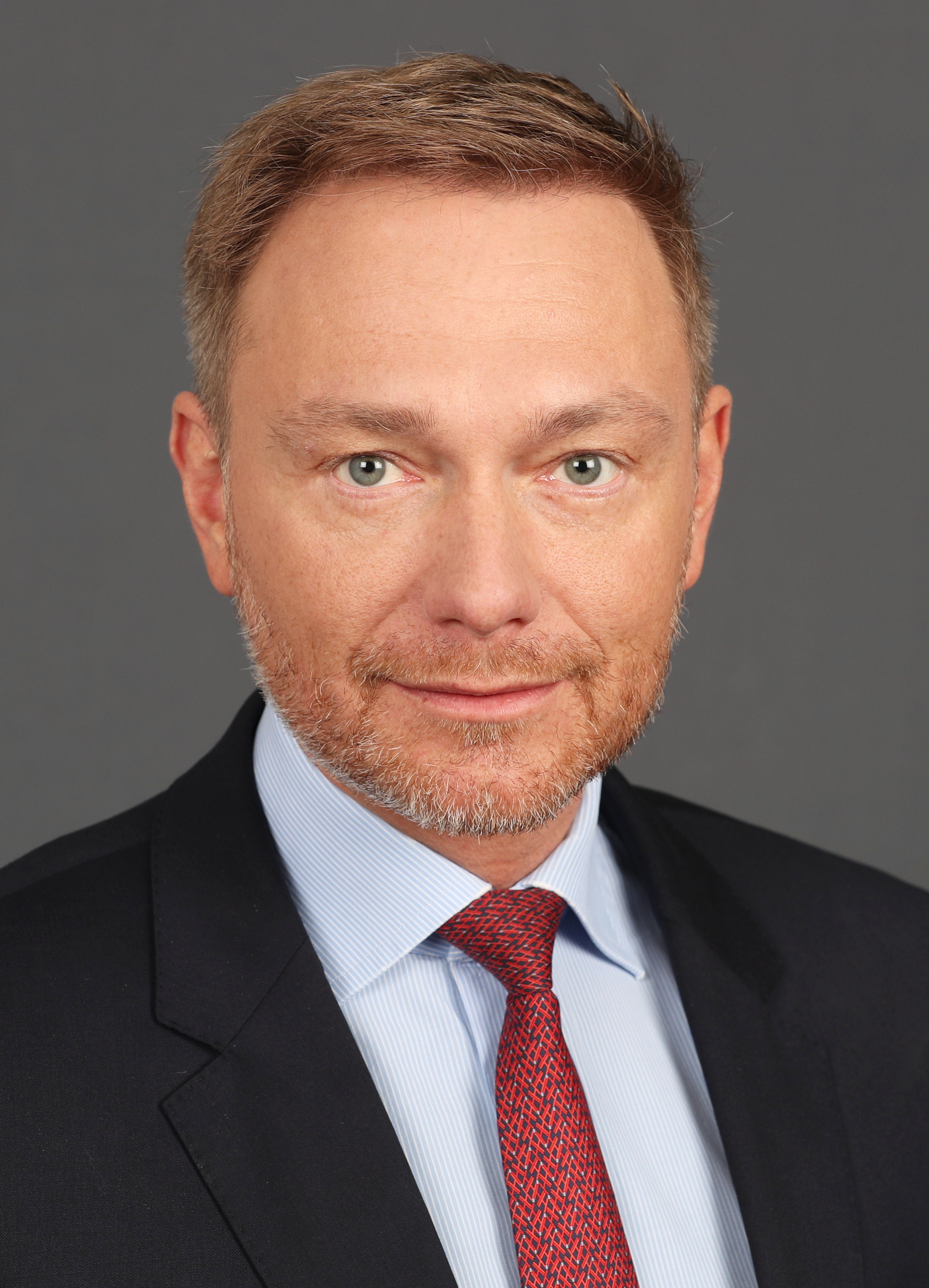
Christian Lindner (FDP), former German Minister of Finance and coalition partner of Scholz's cabinet

On the night of 6 November, shortly after talks with Lindner and Habeck, Scholz announced he would ask Frank-Walter Steinmeier, the president of Germany, to dismiss Lindner from his position as finance minister. According to the German Constitution, the president has to dismiss federal ministers from their post if this is requested by the chancellor.

In his statement, Scholz said he saw himself forced to this measure to prevent damage to the country and to uphold the government's capacity to act. He stated he had made an offer to Lindner earlier that day as to how the gap in the budget could be filled, which Lindner had failed to accept.

On 7 November, President Steinmeier officially dismissed Lindner and swore in his successor, Jörg Kukies (SPD), as requested by Scholz. As Kukies was formerly an investment banker at Goldman Sachs, his appointment was criticised by some politicians, including members of Scholz's own Social Democratic Party as well as Sahra Wagenknecht, leader of the left-populist BSW.

In response to Lindner's dismissal, the FDP ministers Marco Buschmann and Bettina Stark-Watzinger resigned. Minister for Transport Volker Wissing announced he would leave the FDP to remain in his post, also taking over Buschmann's position as Minister of Justice in a dual mandate. Similarly, Stark-Watzinger's position as Minister of Education and Research was taken over by Cem Özdemir, the Minister for Food and Agriculture. This effectively moved the FDP into the opposition, rendering the current coalition a two-party minority government between the SPD and The Greens.

On 8 November, Wissing's website became victim of a hostile takeover, after which the homepage displayed FDP advertisements.

== FDP "D-Day" paper ==
On 15 November, the newspapers Die Zeit and Süddeutsche Zeitung independently reported that the FDP had been planning a strategy to break the coalition for several weeks. They reported on the existence of a detailed working paper which used controversial militaristic language: the 18-page economic report that resulted in Lindner's firing was called "the torpedo", and the upcoming election campaign was described as "open battle". Most contentious was that the day of the report's publication was referred to as "D-Day" – which in German is used exclusively in reference to the Allied invasion of Normandy and has a violent connotation. The use of the language of war to refer to the political process led to heavy criticism.

This also contradicted Lindner's assertion that the end of the government was a "calculated break" on the part of Scholz. Criticism came from the SPD upon the revelation that their coalition partner had apparently not been acting in good faith for weeks: parliamentary leader Rolf Mützenich described himself as "feeling deceived and disappointed" and "horrified" by the controversial language. In an 18 November interview with RTL and n-tv, FDP general secretary Bijan Djir-Sarai flatly denied the use of the term "D-Day" and stated the party's leadership was not aware of the paper. Lindner did not deny the paper's existence but simply replied to reporters "We are in a campaign. Where is the news here?"

Media speculation continued as to what degree the FDP was responsible for the coalition's end. On the morning of 28 November, the online news portal Table.Media published excerpts of an eight-page document alleged to be the working paper; it was indeed titled "D-Day Scenarios and Actions" and laid out a strategy as detailed as the original reporting surmised, including strategies to undermine the coalition, communication tactics, and pre-written quotations for Lindner. SZ confronted party leaders with the excerpts and gave them a 1:30 p.m. deadline to respond to questions. The party did not, but instead officially released the full paper at 6 p.m. with a statement from Djir-Sarai claiming it was "to prevent false impressions ... of the paper" by the media.

According to the party, the paper was first prepared by Federal Managing Director Carsten Reymann on 24 October "to deal with the questions surrounding how the exit of the FDP from the government could be communicated", and the "purely technical paper" was not presented to legislators or members of the government. Djir-Sarai and Reymann resigned the next day to take responsibility for the paper's contents. SPD acting general secretary Matthias Miersch described Djir-Sarai as "a transparent scapegoat" to protect Lindner and called it "unimaginable" that the party leader would not know of the paper's existence. In a written statement released that evening, Lindner again denied any knowledge of the paper and stated he would not have approved of it, and that it was only circulated among internal party staffers and not any elected officials.

Marco Buschmann, who served as justice minister until the traffic light coalition's collapse, was appointed to succeed Djir-Sarai as general secretary of the FDP on 1 December.

== Vote of confidence ==
On 6 November, after the announcement of Lindner's dismissal, Scholz also announced his intention to call for a vote of confidence in his government on 15 January 2025, potentially enabling an early 2025 federal election. Should the chancellor not win the confidence of the majority of the Bundestag in the vote, he would be able to request the president to dissolve the Bundestag (Article 68 of the constitution). The president would then have 21 days to consider the request; if he agreed to the dissolution, a snap election would be held within 60 days of the dissolution date.

Scholz' plan for a vote of confidence on 15 January 2025 would have required a possible snap federal election in early April at the latest, per the constitution. Several opposition parties called for a vote of confidence in November 2024, much sooner than the date proposed by Scholz. Supporters of this initiative include the Christian Democratic Union (CDU) and the Christian Social Union (CSU) parties (both centre-right), the far-right Alternative for Germany (AfD) and the left-populist Sahra Wagenknecht Alliance (BSW). A poll taken by German public broadcaster ARD also found that 65% of those surveyed favoured immediate elections.

On 8 November, Ruth Brand, the Federal Returning Officer responsible for organising the election, raised concerns about an election date in January, deeming it administratively difficult to organise the election by then, because of the Christmas break. The left-wing opposition party Die Linke also supported the chancellor in his push for a later election date.

On 10 November, Scholz showed himself open to moving his vote of confidence to before the Christmas break, declaring he would orient himself to a schedule by SPD parliamentary group leader Rolf Mützenich and opposition leader Friedrich Merz (CDU). On 12 November, a compromise was reached between the SPD and the CDU/CSU for the vote of confidence to occur on 16 December 2024 and the election to be held on 23 February 2025.

The results of the confidence vote. "No" in magenta, "yes" in green, "abstain" in gray, and those in black did not vote.

On 16 December, Scholz lost the confidence vote, paving the way for elections to be held in February 2025.

16 December 2024; Vote of confidence in the Scholz cabinet
Vote	Parties	Votes
Yes	SPD (201), AfD (3), Non-attached members (3)	207 / 601
No	CDU-CSU (196), FDP (88), AfD (69), Left (26), BSW (10), Non-attached members (5)	394 / 601
Abstentions	Greens (115), AfD (1)	116 / 733
Not voting	SPD (6), AfD (3), FDP (2), Greens (2), Left (2), Non-attached members (1)	16 / 733

== Further developments ==
=== Cooperation with CDU ===
Opposition leader Friedrich Merz (CDU) met with President Steinmeier on 7 November to discuss the situation. Scholz announced that he would ask Merz for support in passing the budget and boosting military spending.

=== Dissolution of Bundestag ===
As expected, President Steinmeier formally dissolved the Bundestag on 27 December 2024, and announced new elections for 23 February 2025.

== See also ==
- 2024–2025 Canadian political crisis
- 2024 Thuringian state election
- 2024 Saxony state election
- 2024 Brandenburg state election
- 2025 German federal election
