= Welt am Sonntag =

German Sunday newspaper

- Sample front page
- Type: Sunday newspaper
- Format: Broadsheet
- Owner: Axel Springer SE
- Publisher: Stefan Aust
- Editor-in-chief: Dagmar Rosenfeld
- Editor: Johannes Boie
- Founded: 1948; 78 years ago
- Political alignment: Conservative
- Headquarters: Berlin, Germany
- Website: welt.de

Welt am Sonntag (German pronunciation: [ˈvɛlt ʔam ˈzɔntaːk], lit. 'World on Sunday') is a German Sunday newspaper published in Germany.

== History and profile ==
Welt am Sonntag was established in 1948. The paper is published by Axel Springer SE. Its head office is in Berlin. It has local editions for Berlin, Hamburg, Munich, and Düsseldorf.

It is the Sunday edition of the daily Die Welt. It includes sections on politics, sport, economics, finance, culture, style, travel, and real estate.

In 2009, Welt am Sonntag was recognized as one of the "World’s Best-Designed Newspapers" by the Society for News Design, along with four other newspapers. In 2012, the paper was named European Newspaper of the Year in the category of nationwide newspapers. In 2013, Welt am Sonntag won the same award, but this time in the category of weekly newspapers.

During the second quarter of 1992, Welt am Sonntag had a circulation of 420,000 copies. Its circulation was 381,000 copies in 1997, and 532,000 in 2014.

== Editor-in-chief terms ==
- 1948–1968: Bernhard Menne
- 1975–1976: Hans Bluhm
- 1976–1988: Claus Jacobi
- 1979–1994: Manfred Geist
- 1995–1996: Günter Böddeker
- 1998–2001: Kai Diekmann
- 2001–2003: Thomas Garms
- 2004–2008: Christoph Keese
- 2008–2010: Thomas Schmid
- 2010–2015: Jan-Eric Peters
- 2016–2017: Stefan Aust
- 2017–2019: Peter Huth
- 2019–2021: Johannes Boie
- 2022-2024: Dagmar Rosenfeld

=== Notable editor terms ===
- 2004–2008: Alan Posener
