= German economic crisis (2022–present) =

Economic downturn in Germany

Real GDP growth of Germany compared to advanced economies and worldwide (2020-2025)

Since 2022, Germany's economy has experienced a downturn that marked a dramatic reversal of its previous "labour market miracle" period of 2005–2019. The country, which had been considered to be Europe's economic powerhouse in prior decades, became the worst-performing major economy globally in 2023 with a 0.9% contraction, followed by further 0.5% contraction in 2024 leading to recession. In 2025 however the German economy registered a small increase. The IMF projects a growth rate of 0.8% for 2026. Several economists, business figures, and other experts expressed concern that Germany's economic downturn could cause the nation to reclaim its reputation as the "sick man of Europe" from the 1990s.

This decline was attributed to multiple factors: A lack of urgency in diversifying its energy supply before 2022 leading to increased energy prices (coinciding factors include the complete cessation of gas imports from Russia from 2022 onwards, its nuclear energy phase-out with the last plants shut down in 2023, a slow pace of energy transition, and increased cost of fossil fuels partly due to tax increases), comparatively lower productivity due to slow adaptation of digital technologies, German politics (specifically the debt limitation, the CDU/CSU-filed application to the Federal Constitutional Court successfully deeming a €60 billion climate fund unconstitutional as well as the subsequent in-fighting within the governing Scholz cabinet) obstructing economic stimuli, global shifts in demand hurting the country's export-led economy while its higher internal real wage growth-led demand is delayed due to high cost of living, as well as a skilled worker shortage arising from demographic challenges such as population ageing, low participation of women in the workforce and slowing immigration to Germany.

The crisis has had broader implications for German society, including a severe housing shortage affecting 9.5 million people and drastic increases in cost of living. It also significantly contributed to Germany's 2024 government collapse and a radical shift in political dynamics, with greatly declining support for traditionally dominant parties, including the members of the traffic light coalition headed by German Chancellor Olaf Scholz. Alternative populist political movements such as the right-wing Alternative for Germany or the left-wing Sahra Wagenknecht Alliance have conversely gained traction.

== Background ==
From 2005 to 2019, Germany experienced a period of economic strength, often referred to as the "labour market miracle." Employment in Germany had grown by over 15%, rising from 39.3 million to 45.3 million people. This period of growth, combined with low interest rates and unemployment rates coupled with economic stability, had previously helped Germany attract businesses and investors. German economic growth was in part fueled by a growing dependence on cheap Russian natural gas imports.

As of November 2021, Russian oil accounted for 17 percent of total imports in OECD Americas (625 kb/d). On 8 March 2022, US President Joe Biden announced a ban on oil from Russia, telling reporters, "We're banning all imports of Russian oil and gas energy. That means Russian oil will no longer be acceptable in US ports and the American people will deal another powerful blow to Putin's war machine." Germany's Minister for Economic Affairs Robert Habeck cautioned, "If we do not obtain more gas next winter and if deliveries from Russia were to be cut then we would not have enough gas to heat all our houses and keep all our industry going."

On 7 March 2022, German chancellor Olaf Scholz pushed back against the call by the United States and Ukraine for Germany to wean itself away from Russian oil and gas imports because "Europe's supply of energy for heat generation, mobility, power supply and industry cannot be secured in any other way". However, the European Union (EU) indicated that it would cut its gas dependency on Russia by two-thirds in 2022.

In September 2022, German Economy Minister Robert Habeck accused the United States and other "friendly" natural gas supplier nations that they had been profiting from the Russo-Ukrainian war with "astronomical prices". He called on the US to assist energy-pressed allies in Europe. Geopolitical tensions throughout the Middle East contributed to rising oil prices, with Brent Crude futures climbing to $80 per barrel.

== Crisis ==
Germany experienced a recession in 2023, which saw the country's economy contract by 0.3% in its fourth quarter and across all quarters of 2023 together, making it the worst-performing major economy globally that year. Germany was estimated to grow slower than all member states of OECD in 2024, excluding the United Kingdom. Economists pointed primarily to Western sanctions of Russia following its invasion of Ukraine, resulting in Germany being separated from a large portion of its energy supply made of cheap Russian natural gas. These resulted in energy shortages and price increases, impacting significant amounts of economic sub-sectors from small local businesses to massive business projects. Germany became the only economy in the G7 to contract in 2023. Annual inflation reached 6.9% in 2022 but has since receded to 2.2% in 2025. Household consumption fell by 0.8%. Dutch bank ING's global head of macro research Carsten Brzeski stated that Germany had a high risk of recession in 2024 with no predicted short-term rebound, which would mark Germany's first two-year-long recession since 2004. Economists stated that Germany's economy was in a "permanent crisis mode".

In 2024, the German economy entered its second consecutive year of recession. Habeck announced a projected contraction of 0.2% in Germany's gross domestic product (GDP) for the year, drastically reduced from its forecast of a 1.3% increase in 2024. Habeck noted that Germany had experienced sluggish growth since 2018, attributed to a combination of internal structural problems and external global challenges. The country's position in the global economy was described as being "'squeezed' between China and the United States", necessitating a reevaluation of its economic strategies. The announcement followed a 0.1% decline in the prior period, with no growth being recorded for Germany's fifth consecutive quarter. Germany projected the slowest growth among G7 nations for 2024.

=== Budget crisis ===
Beginning on 15 November 2023, a federal budget crisis for the 2024 fiscal year began when Germany's constitutional court ruled that the traffic light coalition government's €60 billion climate fund was unconstitutional. This fund, crucial to the coalition agreement and Germany's climate and energy transition plans, had been created by appropriating leftover emergency debt from COVID-19 pandemic relief measures.

The budget crisis was complicated by disagreements on circumventing the debt brake (German: Schuldenbremse), a fiscal rule implemented in 2009 to limit the budget deficit to only 0.35% of GDP and cap the debt that federal and state governments can issue annually. The debt brake, while a cornerstone of German fiscal policy, had been frequently circumvented since its inception. Previous governments had found ways to work around it, including creating special funds for refugee costs in 2017 and suspending the rule during the COVID-19 pandemic and in response to the Ukraine war. By 2023, there were approximately 29 such funds operating outside the federal budget.

After intense negotiations, Scholz's coalition reached a compromise in December 2023. The deal preserved the debt brake for 2024 but required substantial cuts to the climate and transformation fund, amounting to €45 billion from 2024 to 2027. This compromise averted an immediate political crisis, but necessitated austerity measures during an economic downturn and potentially undermined Germany's climate policy goals. Politico journalist Matthew Karnitschnig referred to the dilemma as "The most German crisis ever".

=== Business ===
Due to accumulating additional energy costs of €3.2 billion in 2022 due to German sanctions on Russian gas, the German chemicals company BASF, one of Germany's largest companies and the world's largest chemical conglomerate, cut 2,600 jobs. The company also was forced to shut down plastic chemical plants and two ammonia plants, while moving other operations outside of Germany, citing prohibitively bureaucratic permitting processes, overregulation, and higher production costs.

In April 2024, the ifo Institute, a prominent economic research center in Munich, reported that over half (55.2%) of the companies in Germany's residential construction sector cited a lack of orders. Additionally, 17.6% of German construction companies reported project cancellations, a slight improvement from 19.6% in March. In 2023, construction sector insolvencies increased by over 20%.

In September, the ifo Institute reported a decline in its business climate index for four consecutive months leading up to September 2024. In August 2024, the index fell to 86.6 points from 87 in July, reaching a five-month low. The index, based on surveys of 9,000 German businesses across various sectors, indicated growing dissatisfaction with the current business conditions and pessimism towards future prospects. The consistent decline in business sentiment was seen as an indicator of ongoing economic pressure, which was particularly pronounced in the manufacturing sector, where its sentiment declined to its lowest level since early 2020. The services sector also experienced a sharp downturn that brought to its lowest point since February 2024. Clemens Fuest, President of the Ifo Institute, characterized the situation by stating, "The German economy is increasingly falling into crisis."

Ifo economist Klaus Wohlrabe characterized the German economy as having "settled into stagnation." Factors he cited include a lack of orders across all sectors, weak investment, and consumer reluctance to spend due to inflation uncertainty, leading him to predict a potential further decline in German gross domestic product (GDP) for the third quarter of 2024, following an unexpected 0.2% contraction in the second quarter. Landesbank Baden-Württemberg bank economist Elmar Voelker and VP Bank economist Thomas Gitzel both expressed pessimism significant improvement before the end of 2024, the latter stating that the German economy was on the cusp of either recession or a period of minimal growth.

The Weil European Distress Index, a comprehensive survey of 3,750 European listed companies across various industries and economic indicators, reported in April 2024 that Germany had become "the most distressed market in Europe". This distress was particularly evident in the industrial sector, which struggled with high interest rates, skilled labor shortages, and convoluted anti-business regulations. The German economy's heavy reliance on exports and its rigid labor market further compounded these issues, leading to concerns about increased insolvencies. It noted that increasing rates of inflation and higher borrowing costs forced many businesses to cease or delay projects, impacting capital investments and hiring decisions. Consumers were impacted by rising prices across various necessities and services, in addition to higher mortgage costs that further reduced disposable income.

The German Purchasing Managers' Index (PMI) provided further evidence of economic challenges. The manufacturing PMI fell to 42.1, which marked its "26th consecutive month of contraction" and falling below market expectations. Hamburg Commercial Bank's Chief Economist Dr. Cyrus de la Rubia noted, "The recession in Germany's manufacturing sector deepened in August, with no recovery in sight." Meanwhile, growth in the services sector continued to decelerate.

==== Foreign investment ====
BNP Paribas Real Estate reported that foreign buyers accounted for 35% of purchases of commercial property in the first quarter of 2024. This figure represented the lowest level of foreign investment since 2013, and marked a decline from 37% in 2023. The decrease in foreign investment was attributed to several factors, including high inflation rates and concerns about a potential recession in Germany.

Deutsche Bahn, Germany's national railway operator, agreed to sell its logistics subsidiary, Schenker, to Danish competitor DSV for approximately €14 billion. Germany's second-largest private lender Commerzbank became a potential target for acquisition. Italian bank UniCredit increased its stake in Commerzbank to 21%, leading to speculation about a possible takeover. Some German companies, such as BASF, invested significantly in facilities abroad. BASF committed €10 billion to a new factory in China. These developments were viewed by economists as natural consequences of economic stagnation and structural changes. The trend of German companies investing more heavily abroad than domestically raised questions about the country's attractiveness as a business location.

=== Cost of living and housing ===
Germany faced a severe housing crisis in 2024, affecting a broad spectrum of its population. Surveys reported that there was a shortage of more than 800,000 apartments across Germany, resulting in over 9.5 million people, predominantly families with single parents, living in cramped conditions. This crisis was not limited to lower-income groups but increasingly impacted the middle class, leading Scholz to describe housing as Germany's most pressing social issue. The German government's ambitious goal of constructing 400,000 new homes annually, which included 100,000 social housing units, proved unattainable due to high construction costs and interest rates. The ifo Institute reported that in 2023, only 245,000 new apartments were built, with projections for 2024 falling to 210,000. This supply shortage, coupled with high demand, led to skyrocketing rents across the country.

The crisis was most acute in large municipalities and university towns. The housing market in Berlin was significantly strained by the proliferation of short-term rentals through platforms like Airbnb, combined with new rental prices averaging twice that of older contracts. The government's attempts to mitigate the crisis, such as extending rent freeze laws until 2029, were often circumvented through loopholes particularly for new, modernized, or partially furnished buildings and apartments. Consumer and retail sectors similarly struggled as households, burdened by the cost of living crisis and increasing housing costs, tightened their spending. Younger consumers, in particular, faced increased debt levels, leaving them with less disposable income for discretionary purchases.

German industry associations expressed concern that the crisis could create a domino effect of widespread economic damage by deterring crucial skilled workers from abroad from Germany's labor market, while also potentially pushing voters towards political extremes. The crisis also led to a surge in homelessness, with some regions reporting a tenfold increase in just a few years. Organizations aiding in navigating the difficult housing market such as the Deutscher Mieterbund (German Tenants' Association) saw record membership levels. Concurrent with the declining business climate, employment in Germany fell at its most rapid rate in four years. This trend was observed in private sector surveys, indicating a broader economic slowdown.

=== GDP ===
German GDP declined by 0.4% from October to the end of December 2022 due to the energy crisis brought on by sanctions against Russian gas and significant price increases. Preliminary data from the German Federal Statistics Office showed that "the economy unexpectedly contracted by 0.1% in the second quarter of 2024", reversing the 0.2% growth of first quarter and missing 0.1% expansion forecasts. The German economy had also contracted by 0.1% on a year-on-year basis, causing the economy to suffer five consecutive quarters with no growth.

Germany's regulatory environment was a subject of ongoing discussion. Since the 1980s, various German governments had pledged to reduce bureaucratic burdens and promote investment. However, progress in this area was limited. The situation was further complicated by European Union regulations, which some economists argued created additional administrative challenges for businesses. Despite the crisis Germany continues to have the second highest GDP per capita of the G8.

The European Union's push for its Green Deal, aiming to achieve climate neutrality by 2050, strongly influenced economic discussions in Germany. Some economists expressed skepticism about the growth potential of green technologies and argued that decarbonization efforts, while important, might not necessarily drive economic growth. Key issues identified as hindering Germany's economic performance included the declining competitiveness of German industry over the preceding decade, excessive bureaucracy and regulatory burdens, the need for digitization in government agencies, and a skilled worker shortage.

== Causes ==
=== Energy policy ===
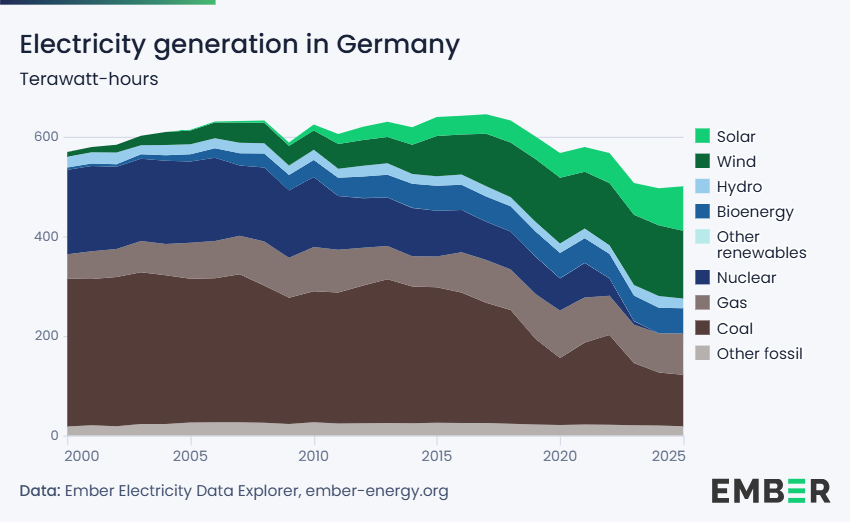
Gross power generation in Germany (2000-2025)

Average household electricity price in Germany from 2019 to 2024

Economists cited Germany's reliance on cheap Russian gas as one of many primary factors for Germany's economic stagnation, which began in the 1960s and intensified after reunification and the liberalization of the German energy market. Prior to the invasion, 55% of Germany's natural gas supply came from Russia, which also represented the primary source of Germany's oil and coal imports. This caused Germany's industry and broader economy to become dependent on cheap Russian gas, in addition to complacency brought on by Germany's economic boom that caused its government to ignore the European Commission's urging to diversify their energy supply. Germany's dependency became a vulnerability following Russia's invasion of Ukraine in 2022. The abrupt disruption of this energy relationship forced Germany to rapidly diversify its energy sources, leading to a 32.6% reduction in gas imports by 2023. The subsequent sanctions and supply disruptions led to a 35% increase in energy prices, contributing to inflation and economic instability.

Another factor cited was Germany's phasing out of its established network of nuclear power, a process initiated and led by The Greens and ultimately enforced by the Second Merkel cabinet. This decision was influenced by concerns resulting from high-profile nuclear accidents, particularly the 2011 Fukushima nuclear accident, which created an energy supply gap. Germany until March 2011 obtained one-quarter of its electricity from nuclear energy, using 17 reactors. The following gap was primarily filled by Russian natural gas, inadvertently increasing dependency on Russian ties. Despite early leadership in renewable energy adoption, Germany's transition has been hampered by antiquated bureaucratic obstacles, complicated and slow processes for approving projects for renewable energy, and local resistance to infrastructure projects, each discouraging further investment in renewable sectors. As of 2024, renewable sources accounted for just over 52% of the country's electricity supply, insufficient to meet industrial demands.

CEO of energy company RWE Markus Krebber warned that the energy crisis could lead to permanent damage to German industry due to gas prices becoming structurally higher compared to European countries. The necessary transition away from prior sources of natural gas and diversification to other energy sources would result in prolonged detrimental effects to energy-intensive industries, potentially leading to significant and permanent declines in structural demand.

During October 2022, Habeck accused Russian President Vladimir Putin of trying to destabilize Germany's and Europe's economy and society by forcing Germany to put sanctions on Russian gas, and insisted that he would fail "as he is currently failing on the battlefield in Ukraine". He further accused Russia of enabling Germany's dependency on cheap Russian gas, calling it "blackmail". In 2026 due to the Iran war oil prices further spiked.

=== Technological adaptation ===
Some experts argued that Germany's economic troubles were partly due to its slow adaptation to technological advancements and shifting to low-productivity sectors, contributing to declining productivity. The International Monetary Fund cited that Germany "lagged behind other EU countries in offering online services to businesses, including registration and tax filing", which would need to be digitalized to speed up bureaucratic hurdles for businesses and consumers. It specifically cited that obtaining a business license took 120 days in 2024, over twice the OECD average.

=== German politics ===
Several German business leaders reported that political in-fighting over new economic stimulus laws was a primary source of the German economy's wider issues. This included the blocking of a bill to cut bureaucracy and give tax breaks to German businesses from the upper house. The constitutional court also ruled attempts to greatly increase spending in the federal budget as illegal.

In addition, arguing and lack of compromise among Scholz's three-way traffic light coalition further hindered efforts to stimulate the economy and contributed to the government's record low numbers of support in polls. Disagreements included those regarding the necessity of keeping German debt low, with liberals urging austerity measures while the Green Party pushed for greater infrastructure spending by amending debt rules in the constitution.

=== Global shifts ===
The United States was increasingly seen as a competitor for climate investments, while China, once a major buyer of German goods, had become a significant rival, especially in advanced manufacturing. The slowdown of the Chinese economy further decreased demand for German exports. In addition, supply chain disruptions caused by geopolitical events such as Houthi attacks on maritime shipments amid the Red Sea crisis impacted the German industrial sector.

=== Housing and infrastructure ===
Germany's decentralized economic structure, with economic strength spread across several municipalities such as Berlin, Cologne, Hamburg, Munich, and Frankfurt, presented a challenge for real estate investors according to economists. Economists stated that unlike countries with a dominant economic hub, Germany lacked a standout city that typically attracts concentrated foreign investment, preventing growth in housing demand and in construction sectors. This was coupled with refinancing difficulties and declining property values, which were felt across Europe. Many firms in the real estate sector found themselves unable to service their debt, limiting their capacity for new investments and ongoing projects.

Several bosses of German construction companies reported that despite there being a pertinent housing shortage in several German cities such as Berlin, that building new homes was "practically impossible" due to approval taking long amounts of time, costly noise and heating regulations, and governmental ignorance of how to solve issues in housing shortages and aid construction work.

Germany's unique position as a nation primarily consisting of renters exacerbated the housing crisis. In 2024, Germany was the only European Union country with more renters than homeowners, with over half the population not owning their homes. This situation was partly attributed to past political decisions, including the sale of thousands of government-owned apartments to private investors and a drastic reduction in social housing construction by local governments. The International Monetary Fund reported that Germany's public investment had been near the bottom among advanced economies, with budgeted funds often underspent due to staff shortages in municipalities, resulting in hindered productivity.

=== Demographics ===
The International Monetary Fund posited that while weakness in Germany's economy could be attributed to multiple temporary factors such as consumer cutbacks due to inflation, interest rate hikes by the European Central Bank, and its restructuring of global demand from manufactured goods following the COVID-19 pandemic, that fundamental structural challenges were significant contributors to economic struggles, including accelerating population aging. The country's working-age population, which had been buoyed by immigration over the previous decade, was projected to decline sharply as baby boomers retired. This demographic shift was expected to decrease the GDP per person, further hinder productivity growth, and cause increased demand for healthcare, potentially forcing workers to go into healthcare away from other sectors. The IMF recommended that Germany make efforts to expand labor force participation, particularly among women, by improving childcare access and reducing secondary earners taxes in married couples.

The German education system also showed signs of decline, with estimates suggesting that falling math skills could cost the economy about €14 trillion in output by the end of the century. The demographic crisis coupled with political strike and austerity measures limited the government's ability to invest in necessary reforms.

== Consequences ==
Energy-intensive sectors such as steelmaking or the chemical industry were particularly hard-hit, with major players like BASF SE, Lanxess AG,ThyssenKrupp AG, and Salzgitter AG significantly reducing their workforce. Within Germany's automotive sector, major companies like Volkswagen AG, Continental AG, ZF Friedrichshafen AG, and Robert Bosch GmbH announced plant closures and job cuts. Tire manufacturers Michelin and Goodyear planned to close several German plants. The renewable energy sector, particularly solar panel and battery manufacturers, struggled to compete with Chinese rivals, leading to job cuts and potential relocations. Economic downturn trends were illustrated by the closure of a 124-year-old steel pipe factory in Düsseldorf, where 1,600 workers lost their jobs.

=== Employment ===
While unemployment in Germany steadily rose over the last couple of years, it remains low by historical and regional standards. As of January 2026 the unemployment rate in Germany stands at 4.0%, well below the EU average of 5.8%.

=== Political ===
In 2021, the Social Democratic Party (SPD) led by Scholz achieved unexpected success in the federal election, with particularly strong results in the eastern state of Brandenburg. This success was attributed in part to promises of economic reforms, such as raising the minimum wage.

By 2024, the political landscape had shifted dramatically. The Alternative für Deutschland (AfD), a right-wing populist party, gained significant traction in eastern Germany. In the regional elections of Saxony, Thuringia, and Brandenburg, the AfD emerged as a leading contender, with polls indicating a possibility of winning state elections for the first time. Despite gaining seats in all three elections they were unable to form government in any. Support for the ruling coalition was polled at only 34% in early 2024. In the 2025 German federal election the ruling coalition was defeated, and Friedrich Merz became chancellor, though the AfD emerged in second place, the CDU formed government with the SPD. Also of note the Free Democratic Party (FDP) which was part of the Scholz cabinet lost all seats.

Concurrently, a new political force emerged: the Sahra Wagenknecht Alliance (BSW), self-described as "left-conservative" party that campaigned on platforms that included abandoning climate goals, halting military aid for Ukraine, and reducing immigration levels. The Sahra Wagenknecht Alliance won no seats in the 2025 federal election.

=== Europe ===
The German DAX index for some years underperformed compared to other major eurozone indices, resulting in associated European companies such as MTU Aero Engines, Qiagen NV, and Siemens Energy, experiencing notable declines in their stock prices. However in 2025 the DAX outperformed all major European stock indices.

=== International ===
The challenging economic environment led to a notable trend of German businesses increasing their investments abroad, particularly in the United States. Analysis by fDi Markets showed that German companies had "nearly tripled their investments in the U.S. in 2023 to $15.7 billion". Major companies like Volkswagen, Mercedes-Benz, and RWE significantly increased their investment in the U.S. market. This shift was attributed not only to Germany's industrial downturn but also to attractive policies in the U.S., such as the Inflation Reduction Act, which offered substantial subsidies to incoming businesses. Markus Krebber, the CEO of RWE, noted that while Europe had similar intentions to incentivize manufacturing, it lacked the comprehensive policy measures seen in the U.S., hence his decision to expand the business to the U.S. with a $15 billion investment plan.

At the same time, Germany itself remains attractive for foreign investments, receiving €34.8 billion in Foreign Direct Investment in 2023 with US companies being the largest source of investments.

== See also ==
- Deindustrialization
- 2021–2023 inflation surge
- 2021–2023 global supply chain crisis
- 2022 Russia–EU gas dispute
- Economic impact of the Russian invasion of Ukraine
- European debt crisis
- Global energy crisis (2021–2023)
- Great Recession in Europe
- Hyperinflation in the Weimar Republic
- International sanctions during the 2022 Russian invasion of Ukraine
