= Die Welt =

German national daily newspaper

- The 1 September 2020 front page of Die Welt
- Type: Daily newspaper
- Format: Broadsheet
- Owner: Axel Springer SE
- Publisher: –
- Editor-in-chief: Helge Fuhst
- Editor: Dagmar Rosenfeld
- Founded: 2 April 1946
- Political alignment: Conservatism; Liberal conservatism Centre-right
- Headquarters: Berlin, Germany
- ISSN: 0173-8437
- Website: www.welt.de

Previous logo (2010 – 29 November 2015)

Die Welt (German pronunciation: [diː ˈvɛlt], lit. 'The World') is a German national daily newspaper, published as a broadsheet by Axel Springer SE. Die Welt is the flagship newspaper of the Axel Springer publishing group and it is considered a newspaper of record in Germany. Its leading competitors are the Frankfurter Allgemeine Zeitung, the Süddeutsche Zeitung and the Frankfurter Rundschau. The modern paper takes a self-described "liberal cosmopolitan" position in editing, but it is generally considered to be conservative.

During 2014, the average circulation of Die Welt was approximately 180,000. The paper may be obtained in more than 130 countries. Daily regional editions appear in Berlin and Hamburg. A daily regional supplement also appears in Bremen. The main editorial office is in Berlin, in conjunction with the Berliner Morgenpost.

Die Welt was a founding member of the European Dailies Alliance, and has a longstanding co-operation with comparable daily newspapers from other countries, including The Daily Telegraph (UK), Le Figaro (France), and ABC (Spain).

From 2004 to 2019, the newspaper also published a compact edition entitled Welt Kompakt, a 32-page cut-down version of the main broadsheet targeted to a younger public. The paper does not appear on Sundays, but the linked publication Welt am Sonntag takes its place.

== History ==
Die Welt was founded in Hamburg in 1946 by the British occupying forces, aiming to provide a "quality newspaper" modeled on The Times. It originally carried news and British-viewpoint editorial content, but from 1947 it adopted a policy of providing two leading articles on major questions, one British and one German. The newspaper was bought by Axel Springer in 1953.

The 1993 circulation of the paper was 209,677 copies. At its peak in the occupation period, it had a circulation of approximately a million.

In 2002 the paper experimented with a Bavarian edition.

In November 2010, a redesign for the newspaper was launched, featuring a new logo with a dark blue globe, a reduced number of columns from seven to six, and typography based on the Freight typeface designed by Joshua Darden. Welt Kompakt was also redesigned to use that typeface.

On 2 May 2014, the Swiss German business magazine Bilanz began to be published as a monthly supplement of Die Welt.

On 18 January 2018, the German television channel N24 changed its name to Welt.

In 2025, Olaf Gersemann was appointed as Welt's first Deputy Editor-in-Chief for Artificial Intelligence, responsible for establishing the integration of AI-generated content in the newspaper.

Jan Philipp Burgard was forced to resign as editor in chief in January 2026; he was replaced by Helge Fuhst, the former head of the Tagesthemen editorial team and second editor-in-chief of ARD-aktuell of the German public-service broadcaster ARD prior to his Welt position.

== Ban ==
The paper was banned in Egypt in February 2008 due to the publication of cartoons depicting the Islamic prophet Muhammad.

== Podcast ==
Axel Springer SE has acquired the podcast "based", founded by journalists Dominik Steffens and Benjamin Scherp for the publication portofolio of Die Welt in 2026. The podcast is aimed at a young audience and is positioned politically conservative-liberal, close to Friedrich-Naumann Foundation.

== Welt-Literaturpreis ==
From 1999 to 2019, the Die Welt book supplement Die Literarische Welt ("The Literary World") presented an annual €10,000 literature prize available to international authors. The award is in honor of Willy Haas who founded Die Literarische Welt in 1925.

=== Recipients ===
- 1999 Bernhard Schlink
- 2000 Imre Kertész
- 2001 Pat Barker
- 2002 Leon de Winter
- 2003 Jeffrey Eugenides
- 2004 Amos Oz
- 2005 Yasmina Reza
- 2006 Rüdiger Safranski
- 2007 Daniel Kehlmann
- 2008 Hans Keilson
- 2009 Philip Roth
- 2010 Claude Lanzmann
- 2011 Albert Ostermaier
- 2012 Zeruya Shalev
- 2013 Jonathan Franzen
- 2014 Haruki Murakami
- 2015 Karl Ove Knausgård
- 2016 Zadie Smith
- 2018 Virginie Despentes
- 2019 Salman Rushdie

== Editors ==
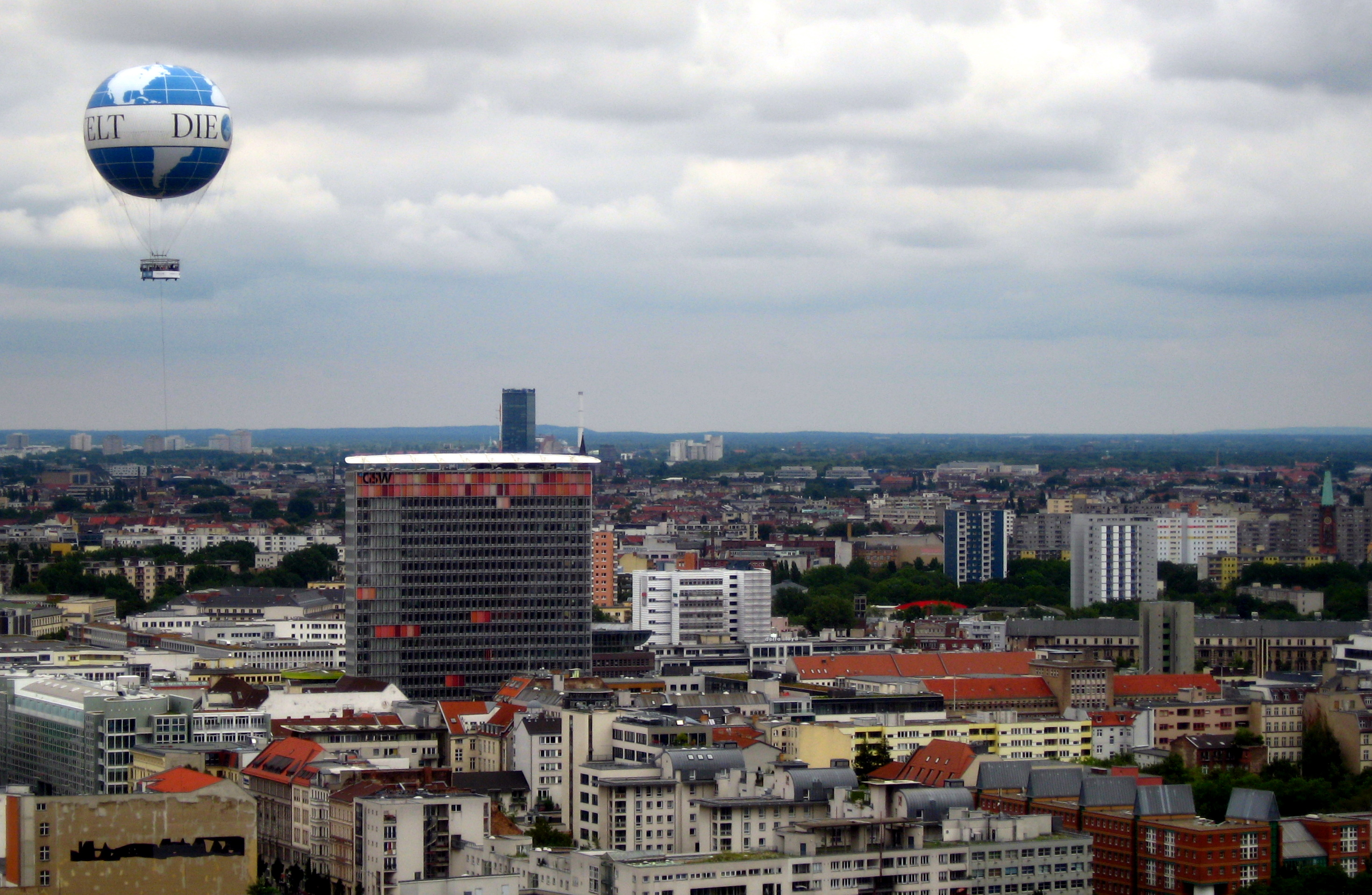
The Weltballon over Berlin

- Rudolf Küstermeier (1946–1953)
- Bernhard Menne (1950)
- Paul Bourdin (1950)
- Hans Scherer, Adalbert Worliczek, Adolf Helbig (1950–1952)
- Albert Komma (1952–1953)
- Hans Zehrer (1946 / 1953–1966)
- Herbert Kremp (1969–1985)
- Manfred Schell (1985–1992)
- Peter Gillies (1985–1988)/(1992–1995)
- Claus Jacobi (1993–1995)
- Thomas Löffelholz (1995–1998)
- Mathias Döpfner (1998–2000)
- Wolfram Weimer (2000–2002)
- Jan-Eric Peters (2002 – 31 December 2006)
- Thomas Schmid (1 January 2007 – 2010)
- Jan-Eric Peters (since 2010 – 2015)
- Stefan Aust (1 January 2016 – 5 September 2016)
- Ulf Poschardt (6 September 2016 – 28 February 2019)
- Dagmar Rosenfeld (1 March 2019 – 31 December 2021)
- Jennifer Wilton (1 January 2022 – January 2025)
- Jan Philipp Burgard (January 2025 – January 2026)
- Helge Fuhst (January 2026 – present)

== Publishers ==
- Stefan Aust (2014–2024)
- Ulf Poschardt (2025–2026)

== Criticism ==
Die Welt has been criticized for publishing climate-sceptic articles. A study published in 2017 that examined the publications of various newspapers over a period of one year from June 2012 to May 2013, found that 43% of articles included in the sample for the publication were climate-sceptical, having the highest climate-sceptical value of all German newspapers.

Liz Fekete criticized the newspaper in 2024 for uncritically adopting Israel's talking points on the Middle East conflict, to the disadvantage of Palestinians, and spreading misinformation about the prevalence of antisemitism among immigrants.

In December 2024, opinion department chief Eva Marie Kogel left Die Welt protesting the publication of an op-ed by Elon Musk that supports AfD.

== See also ==
- William Denholm Barnetson
- Media of Germany
