= Katja Suding =

German politician (born 1975)

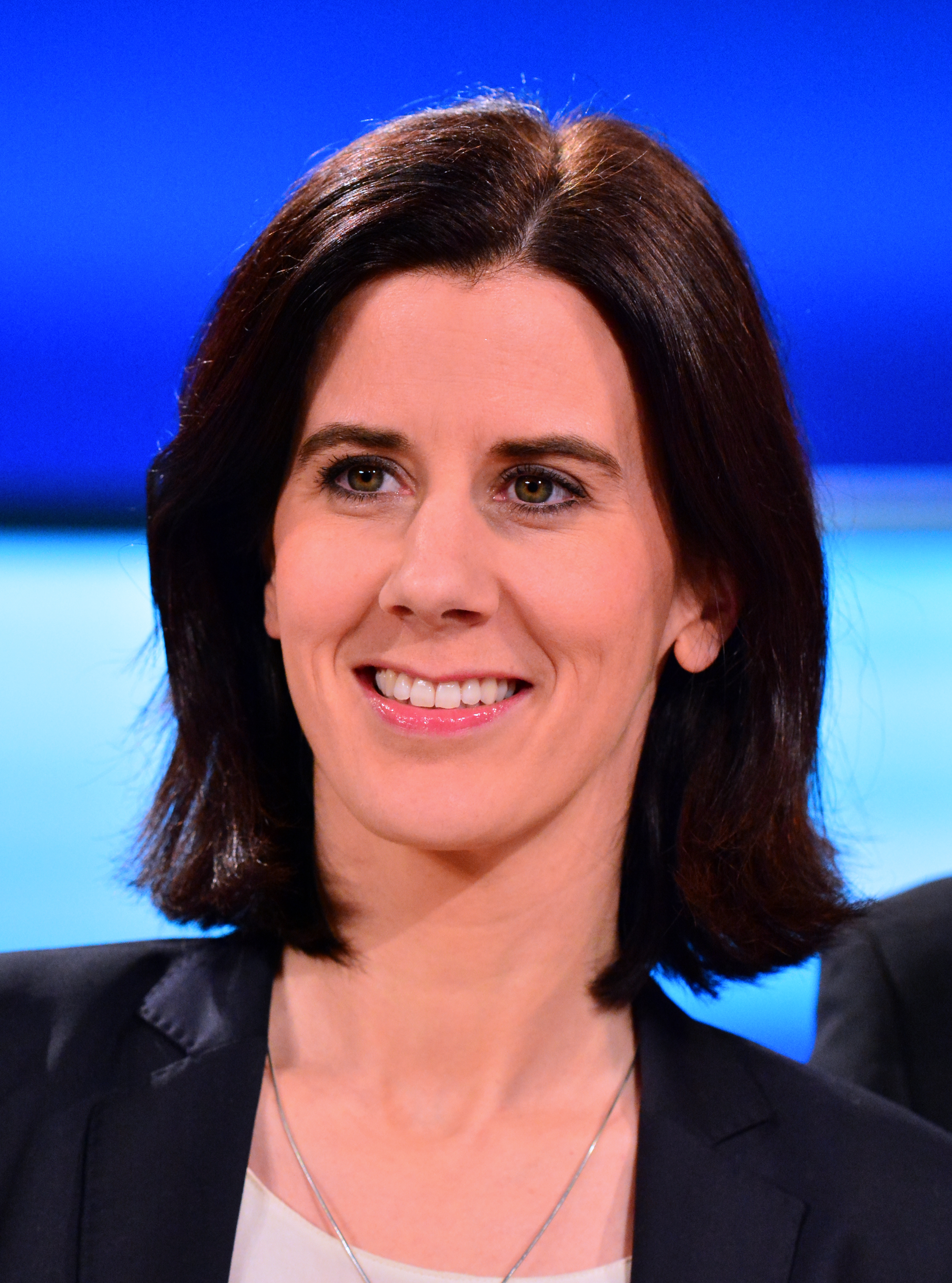
- Suding in 2015

Leader of the Free Democratic Party in Hamburg
- In office 8 November 2014 – 25 April 2021
- Deputy: Claas Voigt
- Preceded by: Sylvia Canel
- Succeeded by: Michael Kruse

Deputy Leader of the Free Democratic Party
- In office 15 May 2015 – 14 May 2021
- Leader: Christian Lindner
- Preceded by: Uwe Barth
- Succeeded by: Johannes Vogel

Leader of the Free Democratic Party in the Hamburg Parliament
- In office 7 March 2011 – 24 September 2017
- Preceded by: Burkhardt Müller-Sönksen
- Succeeded by: Michael Kruse and Anna von Treuenfels-Frowein.

Member of the Bundestag for Hamburg
- In office 24 September 2017 – 2021
- Constituency: Free Democratic Party List

Member of the Hamburg Parliament for Blankenese
- Incumbent
- Assumed office 7 March 2011
- Preceded by: Angelika Kempfert

Personal details
- Born: 30 December 1975 (age 50) Vechta, West Germany
- Party: German: Free Democratic Party; EU: Alliance of Liberals and Democrats for Europe
- Children: 2
- Education: University of Münster
- Occupation: Politician

Katja Suding (born 30 December 1975, in Vechta) is a German politician of the Free Democratic Party (FDP) was a member of the German Bundestag from 2017 to 2021. She served as chairwoman of her party's parliamentary group in the Hamburgische Bürgerschaft from 2010 until 2017.

== Early life and education ==
Suding grew up in Vechta. During highschool, she spent a year in Logan, Utah in 1993.

Suding studied political science and romance studies at the University of Münster and graduated in 2003 as Magistra Artium. Already during her studies, she moved to Hamburg in 1999. After six years as freelance PR consultant, Suding moved to the Hamburg office of international consulting firm Edelman in 2011, where she advised Diageo.

== Political career ==
=== Career in state politics ===
Suding has been a member of the FDP since 2006. Since 2008, she has been a member of the Hamburg state executive board of the party. At the 2009 German federal election she stood unsuccessfully in Hamburg-Altona. In December 2010, she was nominated as the leading candidate of the FDP to the 2011 Hamburg state election. The party had failed to gain any seats in the 2004 and 2008 elections, and the polls in 2010 predicted between three and four percent. Under Suding's leadership, the FDP managed a comeback to the Bürgerschaft with 6.7% of the votes, making it the best result since 1974 and giving them nine of the 121 seats. Suding herself was elected to the constituency of Blankenese. After the state elections, her party's parliamentary group elected her as its chairwoman. In addition, she served as a member of the Budget Committee and the Audit Committee.

At the national party convention of the FDP in April 2011 in Rostock, Suding was for the first time elected as a member of the federal executive board of the party under the leadership of chairman Philipp Rösler. In 2015, she was elected the party's deputy chairperson (alongside Wolfgang Kubicki and Marie-Agnes Strack-Zimmermann), this time under the leadership of chairman Christian Lindner.

Suding was a FDP delegate to the Federal Convention for the purpose of electing the President of Germany in 2012 and 2017. In 2016, she announced that she would leave state politics and instead run for a parliamentary seat in the 2017 national elections.

=== Member of the German Bundestag, 2017–2021 ===
Suding was a member of the German Bundestag from September 2017. She served as one of six deputy chairpersons of the FDP parliamentary group under the leadership of its chairman Christian Lindner, where she oversaw the group's activities on education policy. She also served as deputy chairwoman of the German-Italian Parliamentary Friendship Group.

In the (unsuccessful) negotiations to form a coalition government with the Christian Democrats – both the Christian Democratic Union (CDU) and the Christian Social Union in Bavaria (CSU) – and the Green Party following the elections, she was part of the FDP delegation.

In September 2020, Suding announced that she would not stand in the 2021 federal elections but instead resign from active politics by the end of the parliamentary term.

== Life after politics ==
Since 2022, Suding has been a senior advisor to Rud Pedersen Public Affairs.

== Other activities ==
- Alexander Otto Sportstiftung, Member of the Advisory Board
- Übersee Club, Member of the Board of Trustees

== Personal life ==
Suding has been married and is the mother of two sons. The family lived in Groß Flottbek. In 2012, Suding separated from her husband Christian. Since 2015, she has been in a relationship with former professional tennis player Udo Riglewski.
