= Daniel Bahr =

German politician (born 1976)

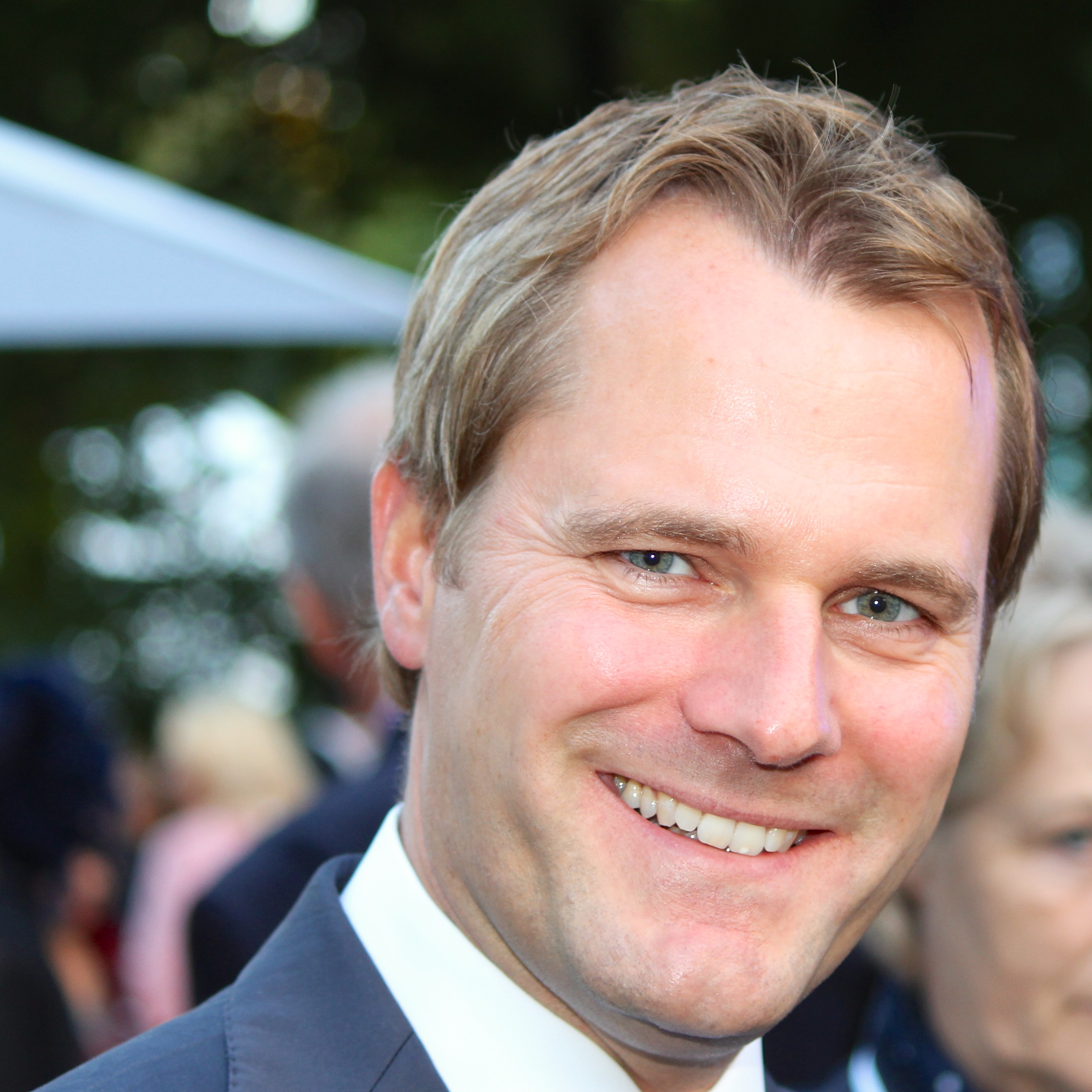
- Bahr in 2012

Federal Minister of Health
- In office 12 May 2011 – 17 December 2013
- Chancellor: Angela Merkel
- Preceded by: Philipp Rösler
- Succeeded by: Hermann Gröhe

Leader of the Free Democratic Party in North Rhine-Westphalia
- In office 27 November 2010 – 13 May 2012
- Preceded by: Andreas Pinkwart
- Succeeded by: Christian Lindner

Parliamentary Secretary of State for Health
- In office 29 October 2009 – 11 May 2011
- Chancellor: Angela Merkel
- Minister: Philipp Rösler
- Preceded by: Marion Caspers-Merk
- Succeeded by: Ulrike Flach

Member of the Bundestag for North Rhine-Westphalia
- In office 17 October 2002 – 22 October 2013
- Constituency: FDP List

Personal details
- Born: 4 November 1976 (age 50) Lahnstein, West Germany
- Party: FDP
- Spouse: Judy Witten
- Children: 3
- Education: University of Münster
- Occupation: Banker
- Website: daniel-bahr.de (in German)

Daniel Bahr (German pronunciation: [ˈdaːni̯eːl ˈbaːɐ̯, ˈdaːni̯ɛl -]; born 4 November 1976) is a German politician of the Free Democratic Party (FDP) who served as Federal Minister of Health from 2011 to 2013. His party failed to get a seat in Bundestag at the 2013 federal elections, and he started to work for Allianz insurance group. Due to his previous position as Minister of Health, his move to a private sector healthcare player has been heavily criticized by the public.

== Early life and education ==
Bahr was born the son of a policeman in Lahnstein, Rhineland-Palatinate. He graduated from Immanuel-Kant High School, Münster, in 1996. He subsequently went on to an apprenticeship as a bank clerk at Dresdner Bank in Schwerin and Hamburg. In the winter of 1998 Bahr began studying economics at the University of Münster, graduating with a Bachelor of Science (BSc) in Economics. In 2008 he completed another course of study, focusing on international healthcare and hospital management, graduating with a Master of Business Administration (MBA).

== Political career ==
Bahr joined the Young Liberals (the German short form is "JuLis" from Junge Liberale) at the age of 14 in 1990. Two years later he became a member of their mother party FDP. From 1994 to 1996, he was chairman of the JuLis in the district of Münster. In 1999, he was elected national chairman of the JuLis, an office he held until 2004.

Bahr became a member of the FDP's federal executive board in 2001. He was widely regarded as the FDP's expert on health policy. In 2003, he became chairman of the party's "Zukunftsforum" (Future Forum) on "Frauen, kinderfreundliches Deutschland, Generationengerechtigkeit" ("Women, Child-friendly Germany, a Generation Fairness").

Bahr served as the chairman of the FDP in the Münsterland district in 2006, and led the party's opposition against the grand coalition's health sector reform. On 27 November 2010, he was elected at the state convention of the North Rhine-Westphalian FDP to the state chairman.

In the negotiations to form a coalition government of the FDP and the Christian Democrats (CDU together with the Bavarian CSU) following the 2009 federal elections, Bahr was part of the FDP delegation in the working group on health policy, led by Ursula von der Leyen and Philipp Rösler.

On 12 May 2011, Bahr was appointed by the Federal President to become the Federal Minister of Health in Chancellor Angela Merkel's second government. His predecessor, Philipp Rösler, moved on to become Federal Minister of Economic Affairs and Vice-Chancellor. On the same day his swearing-in ceremony was held in the German Bundestag. With the German care home sector facing an acute labor shortage, Bahr proposed relaxing rules for bringing in foreign care workers.

In 2012, Bahr was selected a Young Global Leader by the World Economic Forum.

With the commencement of the Cabinet Merkel III on 17 December 2013 Bahr retired from the federal government.

== Career in the private sector ==
From February to mid-2014, Bahr served as a health care reform advisor for the think tank Center for American Progress. In addition, he worked as a guest lecturer on health economics at the University of Michigan.

On 29 September 2014, it was announced that Bahr would join the executive board of Allianz Private Krankenversicherungs-AG (APKV), a health insurance provide owned by Allianz. Following the approval of the Federal Financial Supervisory Authority (BaFin), he has been serving on the company's executive board since 2017.

== Other activities ==
=== Corporate boards ===
- ERGO Group, Member of the Advisory Board (−2009)

=== Non-profit organizations ===
- UNITE – Parliamentary Network to End HIV/AIDS, Viral Hepatitis and Other Infectious Diseases, Member (since 2021)
- DUK Versorgungswerk e.V., Member of the Advisory Board (−2009)
- German Cancer Foundation, Member of the Board of Trustees
- Jugend gegen AIDS, Member of the Advisory Board

== Controversy ==
In 2010, Bahr caused controversy when he—amid a dispute over the proposals of Philipp Rösler to introduce a health premium—accused the coalition partner CSU of behaving like "wild boar" and "only destructive".

== Personal life ==
In 2008, Bahr married lawyer Judy Witten in Hamburg. The couple has three children. In 2019, he was diagnosed with cancer.
