= Johannes Vogel (politician) =

German politician (born 1982)

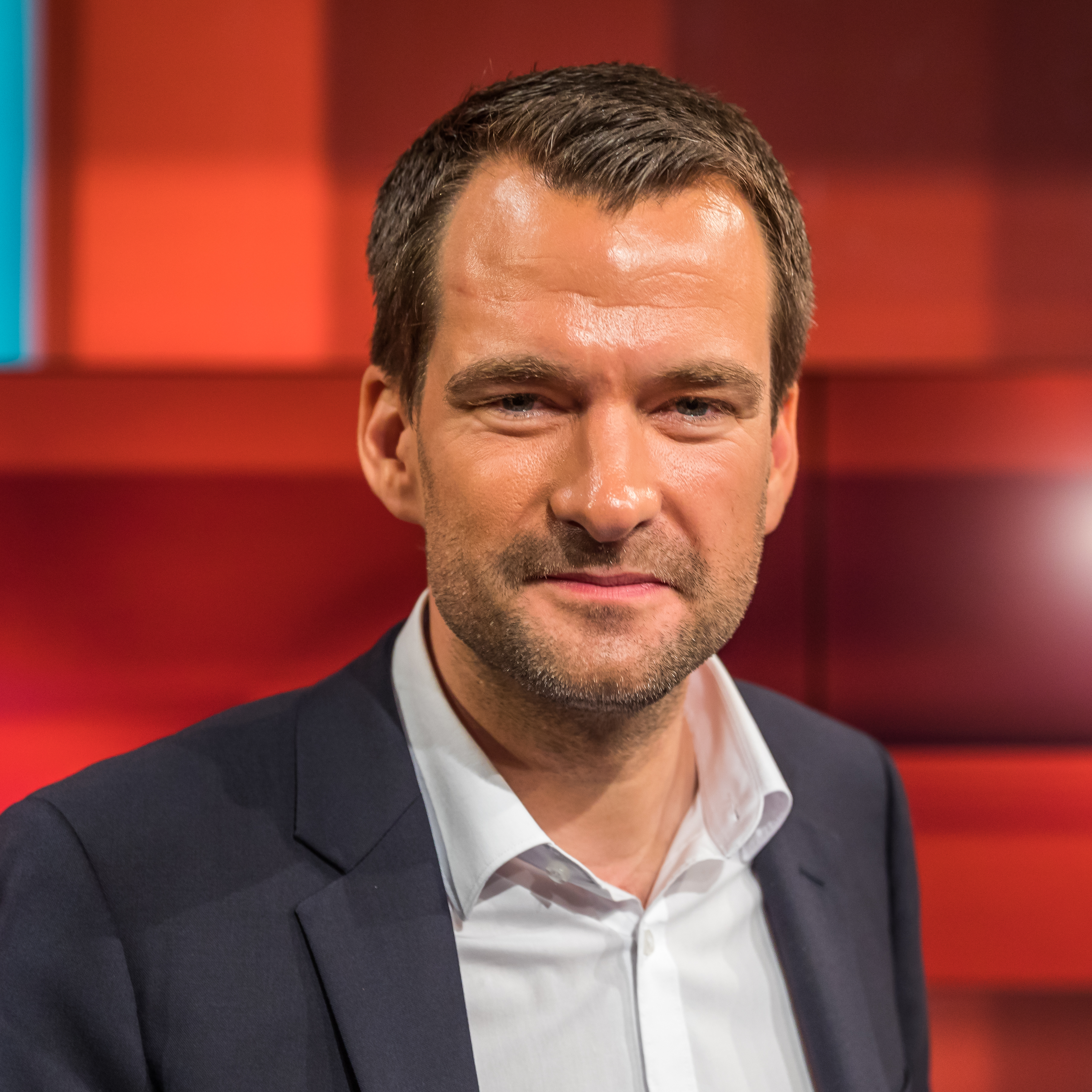
- Vogel in 2023

Chief Whip of the FDP in the Bundestag
- In office 7 December 2021 – 2025
- Leader: Christian Dürr
- Preceded by: Marco Buschmann

Deputy Leader of the Free Democratic Party
- Incumbent
- Assumed office 14 May 2021 Serving with Wolfgang Kubicki and Nicola Beer
- Leader: Christian Lindner
- Preceded by: Katja Suding

Member of the Bundestag
- In office 2017–2025
- In office 2009–2013

Personal details
- Born: 29 April 1982 (age 44) Wermelskirchen, West Germany (now Germany)
- Party: FDP
- Education: University of Bonn

Johannes Vogel (born 29 April 1982) is a German politician of the Free Democratic Party (FDP) who served as a member of the Bundestag from the state of North Rhine-Westphalia from 2009 to 2013 and again from 2017 to 2025.

== Early life and education ==
In 2001 Vogel graduated from high school. After his civil service as a paramedic in Wermelskirchen, he studied political science, history, and public law at the University of Bonn from 2002. He completed his studies in 2009 with the Magister Artium (M.A.).

== Political career ==
From 2005 until 2010, Vogel served as chairman of the Young Liberals. He first became a member of the Bundestag in the 2009 German federal election. From 2009 until 2013, he served on the Committee on Labor and Social Affairs on the Parliamentary Advisory Board on Sustainable Development.

From 2014, Vogel worked with the Federal Employment Agency (BA). That same year, he became the Secretary General of the FDP in North Rhine-Westphalia, under the leadership of its chairman Christian Lindner. In this capacity, he managed the party's campaign ahead of the 2017 state elections. Following the elections, Vogel was responsible for labour and social affairs in the negotiations between Armin Laschet's CDU and the FDP on a coalition agreement.

In the 2017 national elections, Vogel was re-elected to the Bundestag. In parliament, he was a member of the Committee for Labour and Social Affairs and a substitute member of the Committee on Foreign Affairs. He chaired the FDP parliamentary group's working group on labour and social affairs and served as the group's spokesman for labour market and pension policy.

In addition to his committee assignments, Vogel was part of the German-Chinese Parliamentary Friendship Group. In 2020, he joined the Inter-Parliamentary Alliance on China.

In 2019, Vogel took a leave of absence to be a John F. Kennedy Memorial Policy Fellow at Harvard University's Minda de Gunzburg Center for European Studies.

At the FDP's national convention in May 2021, Vogel was elected by delegates as one of three deputies of chairman Christian Lindner, succeeding Katja Suding.

From 2022 to 2025, Vogel also served on the Committee on the Election of Judges (Wahlausschuss), which is in charge of appointing judges to the Federal Constitutional Court of Germany.

== Career in the private sector ==
In September 2025, Frankfurter Allgemeine Zeitung reported that Vogel had signed up to becoming head of human resources and legal affairs at German airline Eurowings.

== Other activities ==
- Deutsche Renten Information (DRI), Member of the Advisory Board
- Human Rights Watch, Member
