= Claus Jacobi =

German news editor

- Born: 17 August 1927 (age 99); Wiesbaden
- Writing career
- Genres: journalism novels
- Notable work: Der Spiegel

Claus Jacobi (4 January 1927 – 17 August 2013) was the editor of the German news magazine Der Spiegel from 1962 to 1968. He was arrested during the Spiegel scandal.

Since 1970 Jacobi worked as editor-in-chief for German newspaper Welt am Sonntag. Since 1973 he worked as editor-in.chief for newspaper Wirtschaftswoche and since 1974 for newspaper Die Welt.

Jacobi was born and died in Hamburg. In 1946, he started his journalistic career. His wife Heidi (they married in 1971) unexpectedly died on 21 February 2012 in her sleep.

== Works (excerpt) ==
- Die menschliche Springflut, 1969 (~ The population explosion of mankind)
- Uns bleiben 100 Jahre. Ursachen und Auswirkungen der Bevölkerungsexplosion, 1986, ISBN 3-550-07739-4 (~ We still have 100 years. Reasons for and effects of the population explosion)
- Fremde, Freunde, Feinde. Eine private Zeitgeschichte, 1991, ISBN 3-550-07804-8
- Aufbruch zwischen Elbe und Oder. Die neuen deutschen Länder, 1995, ISBN 3-550-07084-5 (~ start-up between Elbe and Oder. The new German Bundesländer)
- 50 Jahre Axel-Springer-Verlag. 1946–1996, 1996
- Der Schokoladenkönig. Das unglaubliche Leben des Hans Imhoff, 1997, ISBN 3-7844-2650-6
- Unsere fünfzig Jahre. Erinnerungen eines Zeitzeugen, 1999, ISBN 3-7766-2117-6
- Im Rad der Geschichte. Deutsche Verhältnisse, 2002, ISBN 3-7766-2237-7
- Der Verleger Axel Springer. Eine Biographie aus der Nähe, 2005, ISBN 3-7766-2440-X
