= Jörg Kukies =

German politician, former Federal Minister of Finance (born 1968)

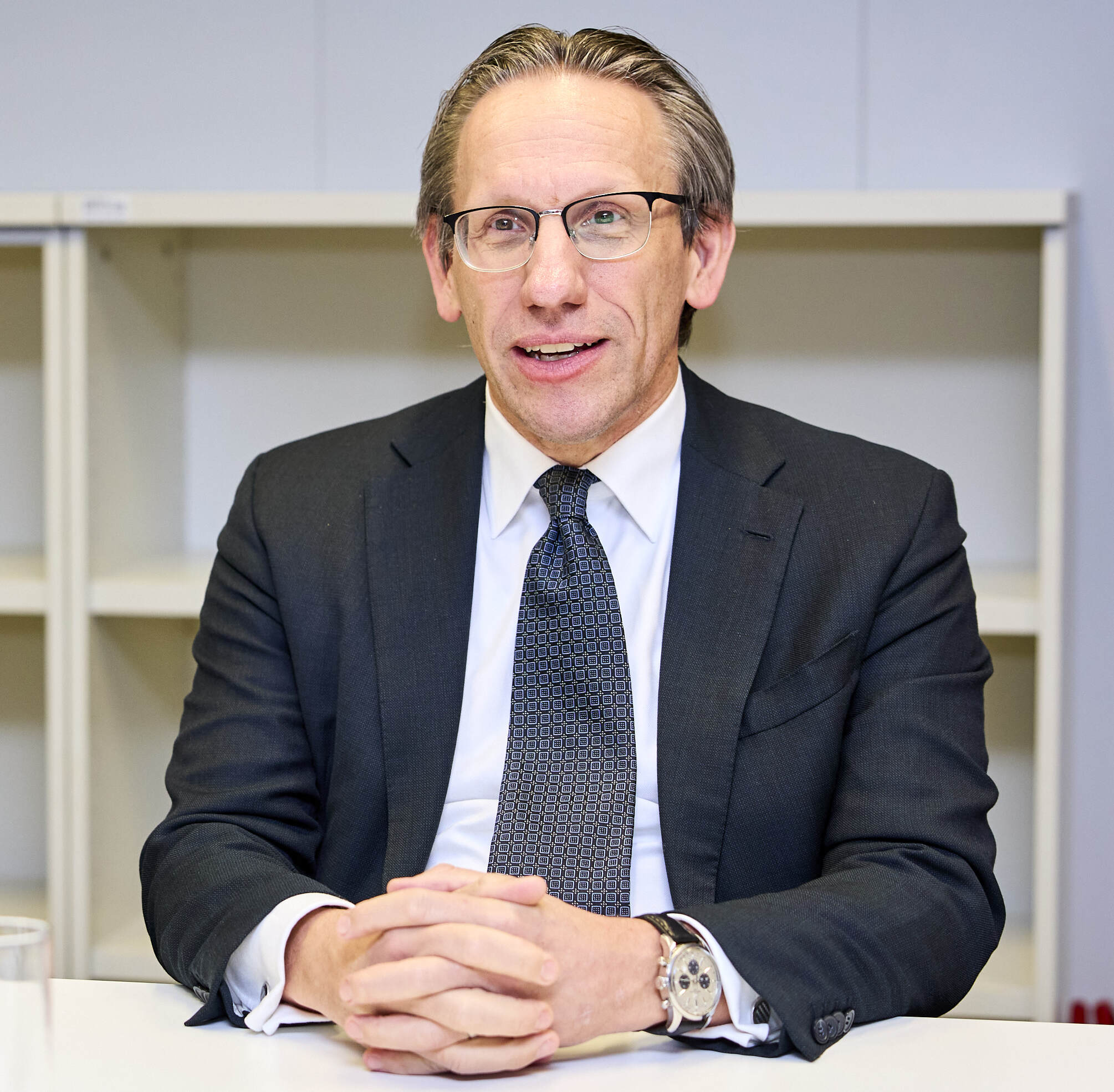
- Kukies in 2025

Minister of Finance
- In office 7 November 2024 – 6 May 2025
- Chancellor: Olaf Scholz
- Preceded by: Christian Lindner
- Succeeded by: Lars Klingbeil

Secretary of State of the Chancellery
- In office 8 December 2021 – 7 November 2024
- Chancellor: Olaf Scholz

Secretary of State of Finance
- In office 14 March 2018 – 8 December 2021
- Chancellor: Angela Merkel
- Minister: Olaf Scholz

Personal details
- Born: Jörg Kukies; 21 February 1968 (age 58) Mainz, Rhineland-Palatinate, West Germany (current-day Germany)
- Party: Social Democratic Party (1986–present)
- Education: Paris 1 Panthéon-Sorbonne University (BA); Harvard Kennedy School (MPA); University of Chicago Booth School of Business (PhD)

Jörg Kukies (German pronunciation: [jœʁk ˈkuːki̯ɛs]; born 21 February 1968) is a German economist and politician of the Social Democratic Party (SPD) who served as Minister of Finance in the government of Chancellor Olaf Scholz from November 2024 to May 2025.

== Early life and education ==
Kukies began his studies in Economics at the Johannes Gutenberg University of Mainz and transferred to the University of Paris 1 Panthéon-Sorbonne, where he received his Maîtrise diploma. He then completed postgraduate studies in public policy at the Harvard Kennedy School from 1995 to 1997 with a Master of Public Administration degree as a McCloy Scholar. He went on to earn a doctorate from the University of Chicago Booth School of Business.

Kukies has been a member of the Social Democratic Party of Germany since the age of 18. During his studies, he headed the Rhineland-Palatinate branch of the Young Socialists (Jusos); in this position, he was succeeded by Andrea Nahles.

== Career in the private sector ==
Kukies spent 17 years working at investment bank Goldman Sachs, where he rose to become co-chief of Germany Austria and head of the securities division in the region.

== Career in government ==
From 2018 to 2021, Kukies served as State Secretary at the Ministry of Finance under minister Olaf Scholz, in the government of Chancellor Angela Merkel.

From 2021 to 2024, Kukies was a State Secretary in the German Chancellery; in this capacity, he also served as Chancellor Scholz's sherpa for G7 and G20 summits.

Kukies briefly served as Minister of Finance following the 2024 German government crisis, replacing Christian Lindner.

In 2025, Kukies and Christian Noyer were appointed by France's Minister of the Economy, Finance and Recovery Éric Lombard and Germany's Minister of Finance Lars Klingbeil to co-chair a French-German Taskforce on Financing Innovative Ventures in Europe.

== Return to the private sector ==
In 2026, Kukies joined Morgan Stanley in London for several months before moving to Frankfurt as country chief for Germany and Austria, as well as the head of Morgan Stanley's continental European operations.

== Other activities ==
=== International organizations ===
- European Bank for Reconstruction and Development (EBRD), Ex-Officio Deputy Member of the Board of Governors (2018–2021)

=== European Union organizations ===
- European Stability Mechanism (ESM), Ex-Officio Deputy Member of the Board of Governors (2018–2021)
- European Financial Stability Facility (EFSF), Member of the Board of Directors (2018–2021)

=== Corporate boards ===
- DHL Group, Member of the Supervisory Board (2020–2021)
- KfW, Deputy Member of the Board of Directors (2018–2021)
- KfW IPEX-Bank, Member of the Supervisory Board (2018–2021)
