= Marco Buschmann =

German lawyer and politician (born 1977)

Marco Buschmann MdB
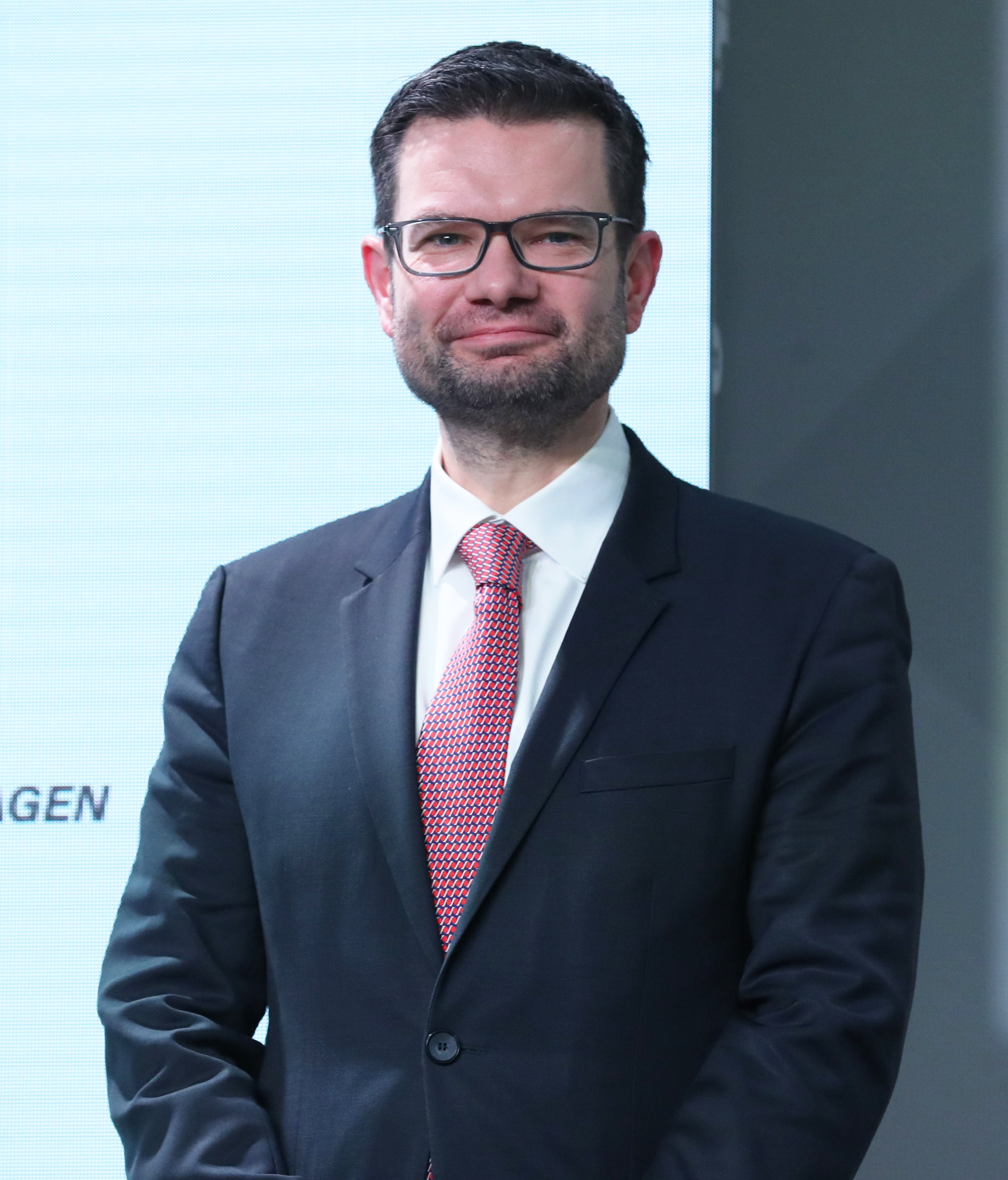
- Buschmann in 2021

Minister of Justice
- In office 8 December 2021 – 7 November 2024
- Chancellor: Olaf Scholz
- Preceded by: Christine Lambrecht
- Succeeded by: Volker Wissing

Chief Whip of the FDP in the Bundestag
- In office 2017–2021
- Leader: Christian Lindner
- Succeeded by: Johannes Vogel

Member of the Bundestag for North Rhine-Westphalia
- In office 24 October 2017 – 23 February 2025
- Preceded by: Multi-member district
- Constituency: FDP List
- In office 27 October 2009 – 22 October 2013
- Preceded by: Multi-member district
- Succeeded by: Multi-member district
- Constituency: FDP List

Personal details
- Born: 1 August 1977 (age 49) Gelsenkirchen, North Rhine-Westphalia, West Germany (present-day Germany)
- Party: Free Democratic Party (1994–present)
- Education: University of Bonn; University of Cologne (Dr. iur.)
- Occupation: Politician; Lawyer
- Website: Official website

Marco Buschmann (born 1 August 1977) is a German lawyer and politician of the Free Democratic Party (FDP) who served as Federal Minister of Justice in Chancellor Olaf Scholz's cabinet from 2021 to November 2024. He served as a member of the Bundestag from the state of North Rhine-Westphalia from 2009 to 2013 and again since 2017 to 2025.

== Early life and career ==
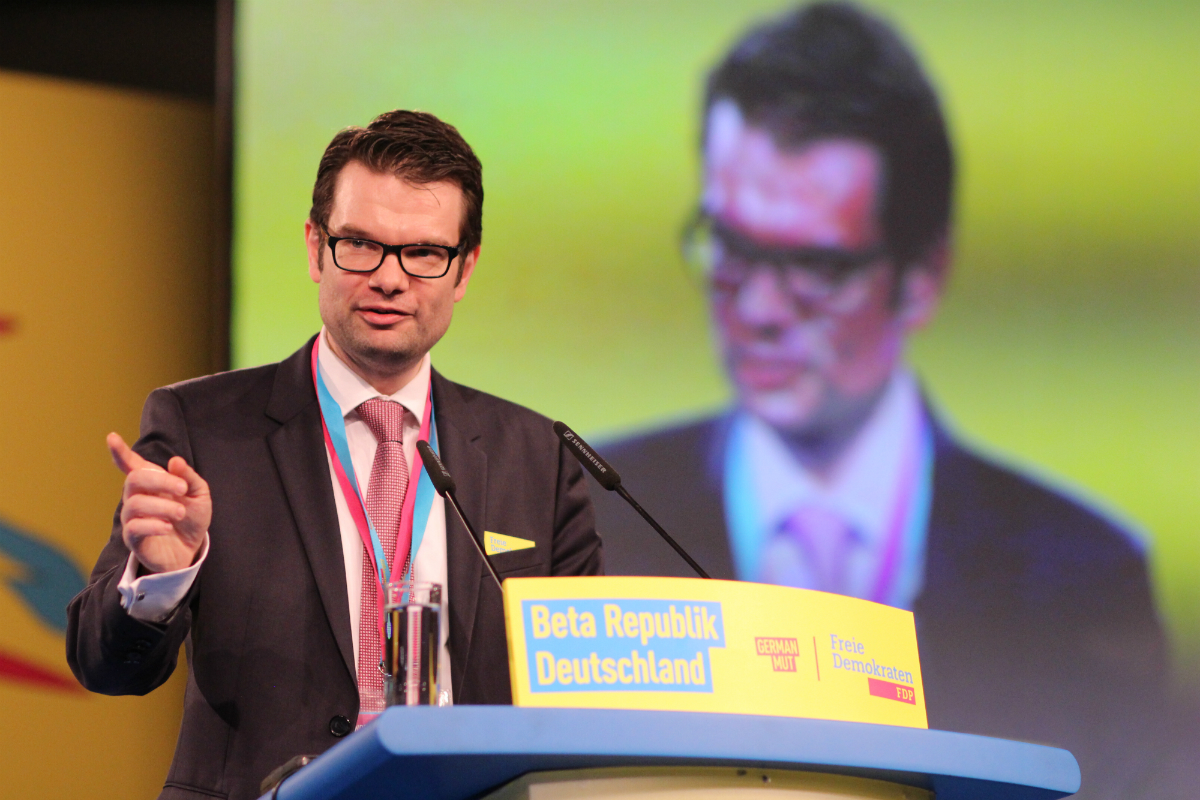
Buschmann in 2016

After graduating from the Max-Planck-Gymnasium in Gelsenkirchen in 1997, Buschmann studied law at the University of Bonn. In 2004, he passed his first state examination at the Düsseldorf Higher Regional Court. This was followed by a legal traineeship at the Regional Court in Essen and in 2007 the Second State Examination at the Higher Regional Court in Hamm.

From 2007 until 2009, Buschmann worked as a lawyer at the Düsseldorf office of international law firm White & Case. In his free time, he was also a SoundCloud artist under the pseudonym MBSounds.

== Political career ==
Buschmann has been a member of the FDP since 1994.

In the 2009 Bundestag elections, Buschmann ran for election in the constituency of Gelsenkirchen and entered the Bundestag via list number 20. In parliament, he served on the Committee on Legal Affairs. He was chairman of the working group on legal affairs in the FDP parliamentary group and an expert on constitutional and economic law. From 2013, he succeeded Christian Ahrendt as the group's spokesperson on legal affairs. Due to the failure of his party to reach the five percent hurdle in the 2013 Bundestag elections, he left the Bundestag.

The federal executive committee of the FDP appointed Buschmann as Federal Executive Director with effect from 1 June 2014. Following his election to the German Bundestag, his term as Federal Executive Director ended on 31 October 2017. Marco Mendorf was appointed as his successor.

=== Member of the German Parliament, 2017–2025 ===
In the 2017 federal elections, Buschmann stood for the FDP in the Gelsenkirchen constituency and was elected to the 19th German Bundestag via 4th place on the North Rhine-Westphalia state list of the FDP. In parliament, he was the chief whip of his parliamentary group, in this capacity supporting the group's chair Christian Lindner. In addition, he was a member of the Council of Elders, which – among other duties – determines daily legislative agenda items and assigns committee chairpersons based on party representation; the Committee on Legal Affairs and Consumer Protection; and the Committee on the Scrutiny of Elections, Immunity and the Rules of Procedure. He was also an alternate member of the Committee on the Election of Judges (Wahlausschuss), which is in charge of appointing judges to the Federal Constitutional Court of Germany.

=== Minister of Justice, 2021–2024 ===
In the negotiations to form a so-called traffic light coalition of the Social Democratic Party (SPD), the Green Party and the FDP following the 2021 German elections, Buschmann was part of his party's delegation in the leadership group, alongside Christian Lindner, Volker Wissing and Bettina Stark-Watzinger. Following the negotiations, the FDP entered the government as part of a coalition agreement, and Buschmann took office as Justice Minister in the Scholz cabinet.

Early in his tenure, Buschmann presented a draft law that would do away with a Nazi-era law forbidding doctors from providing information about abortions. Shortly afterward, he introduced legislation that would cut the red tape required for changing a person's name and gender, abolishing a controversial 1980 law regulating the process.

In October 2023, Buschmann participated in the first joint cabinet retreat of the German and French governments in Hamburg, chaired by Scholz and President Emmanuel Macron.

According to research by the Frankfurter Allgemeine Zeitung in late July 2024 Buschmann ordered Public Prosecutor General Jens Rommel to release the convicted russian murderer Vadim Krasikov based upon §459a of the code of criminal procedure. Krasikov was to be part of a large prisoner exchange, apparently arranged by the Turkish National Intelligence Organization, in which 10 people were sent to Russia, while 16 individuals were freed from russian prisons and transferred to western nations.

During the German government crisis of 2024, Buschmann announced his intention to step down as Minister of Justice on 6 November 2024, thus following two of the three other FDP ministers out of the traffic light coalition. On 7 November 2024, Federal President Frank-Walter Steinmeier dismissed him.

== Other activities ==
- Acceederate, Member of the Advisory Board (since 2026)
- Academy of European Law (ERA), Ex-Officio Member of the Governing Board (2021–2024)
- German Forum for Crime Prevention (DFK), Ex-Officio Chair of the Board of Trustees (2021–2024)
- Magnus Hirschfeld Foundation, Ex-Officio Chairman of the Board of Trustees (2021–2024)
- International Bar Association (IBA), Member
- Amnesty International, Member
- Association of German Foundations, Member of the Parliamentary Advisory Board (2009–2013)
