= Elizabeth Lehfeldt =

American historian (born 1966)

Elizabeth A. Lehfeldt
- Born: January 1966 (age 60)
- Occupations: Medieval Historian and Professor

Academic background
- Education: Lawrence University (BA); Indiana University (MA, PhD)

Academic work
- Discipline: History
- Sub-discipline: female monasticism
- Institutions: Cleveland State University
- Notable works: Religious Women in Golden Age Spain: the Permeable Cloister in 2005

Elizabeth A. Lehfeldt (born January 1966) is an American historian of early modern Europe, focusing primarily on the importance of early modern convents and nuns in Europe. She was the former dean of the Jack, Joseph & Morton Mandel Honors College at Cleveland State University, where she was Mandel Professor in Humanities. She has been a professor of history at Cleveland State University since 1995.

== Education ==
Lehfeldt completed her undergraduate career at Lawrence University as a history major, graduating in June 1988 with high honors. She then completed her master's degree in early modern European history in 1990 and received her Ph.D. in modern European history from Indiana University in 1996. She also received a certificate of medieval studies in 1991 from Indiana University.

== Career ==
=== Scholarly career ===
Lehfeldt has published several articles since 1996 on a variety of topics, mainly on female monasticism with a focus on nuns and the convents in late medieval and early modern Spain and has even published a book about this topic. She published the book, Religious Women in Golden Age Spain: the Permeable Cloister in 2005 (Women and Gender in the Early Modern World); this book was an examination of the role nuns played in late medieval Spain and how gender, religion, and sexuality interacted during this era. The book received positive reviews from critics. One review of the book from an expert in the field, Kimberlyn Lynn Hossain, said in her review:

In such fashion, her six chapters cohere internally and build upon each other, both thematically and chronologically. She analyzes convent patronage, economic management, litigation of numerous kinds, and religious reform, focusing on the mid-fifteenth through the mid-seventeenth centuries. She examines both the spiritual bounds of the convent and its physical spaces. Through numerous lenses, she argues for the permeability of the cloister, even in an era in which much religious reform centered on the cloistering of female religious communities: she carefully demonstrates that the business of life occurred inside the cloister and not simply around it (Hossain, Kimberly Lynn, 836).

Besides writing a book on the subject matter of medieval Spanish nuns, Lehfeldt has also published other works on the topic of late medieval Spain. They include:

- Gender, Order, and the Meaning of Monasticism during the Reign of Isabel and Ferdinand (Archive of Reformation History, 2002)
- Ideal Men: Masculinity and Decline in Seventeenth Century Spain (Renaissance Quarterly, 2008)
- Ruling Sexuality: The Political Legitimacy of Isabel of Castile (Renaissance Quarterly, 2000)
- Why Nuns Aren’t Funny (The Sixteenth Century Journal, 2019)
- Uneven conversions: how did laywomen become nuns in the early modern world? in "Conversions: Gender and Religious Change in Early Modern Europe", edited by Simon Ditchfield and Helen Smith (literary scholar) (Manchester: Manchester University Press, 2017)

=== Professional career ===
Alongside her scholarly research and writing, Lehfeldt has served in several different administrative positions throughout her career. She held the position of dean of the Jack, Joseph & Morton Mandel Honors College and Mandel Professor in Humanities at Cleveland State University with several responsibilities that involved managing over 400 students, instructors, as well as the finances with a budget of $600,000. At CSU, she has held positions of department chair for the history department (August 2009 – 2014) and interim director for the honors program (September 2014-June 2015) at the school. Outside of CSU, she held an administrative position as president of the Sixteenth Century Society and Conference from 2013 to 2014. She is a former Vice President of the Teaching Division of the American Historical Association.

== Honors and awards ==
Lehfeldt has received recognition for her accomplishments, not only as a historian, but as an educator and they include the following, spanning from 1996 to 2011:

- American Historical Association, Bernadotte E. Schmitt Research Grant for Research in Europe, Africa, and Asia (1996)
- Grant for research from the Program for Cultural Cooperation Between Spain's Ministry of Culture and United States' Universities (1997)
- National Endowment for the Humanities Summer Stipend (1997)
- Enhancing Full-Time Faculty Research Development (EFFRD), Graduate College, Cleveland State University (2001)
- Grant from the Program for Cultural Cooperation Between Spain's Ministry of Culture and United States Universities (2001)
- NEH Summer Institute for College and University Teachers: “A Literature of Their Own Women Writing, Venice, London, Madrid, Paris, 1550-1750” (2005)
- Cleveland State University Faculty Scholarship Initiative Award (2011)
