= Dagmar Rosenfeld =

German journalist (born 1974)

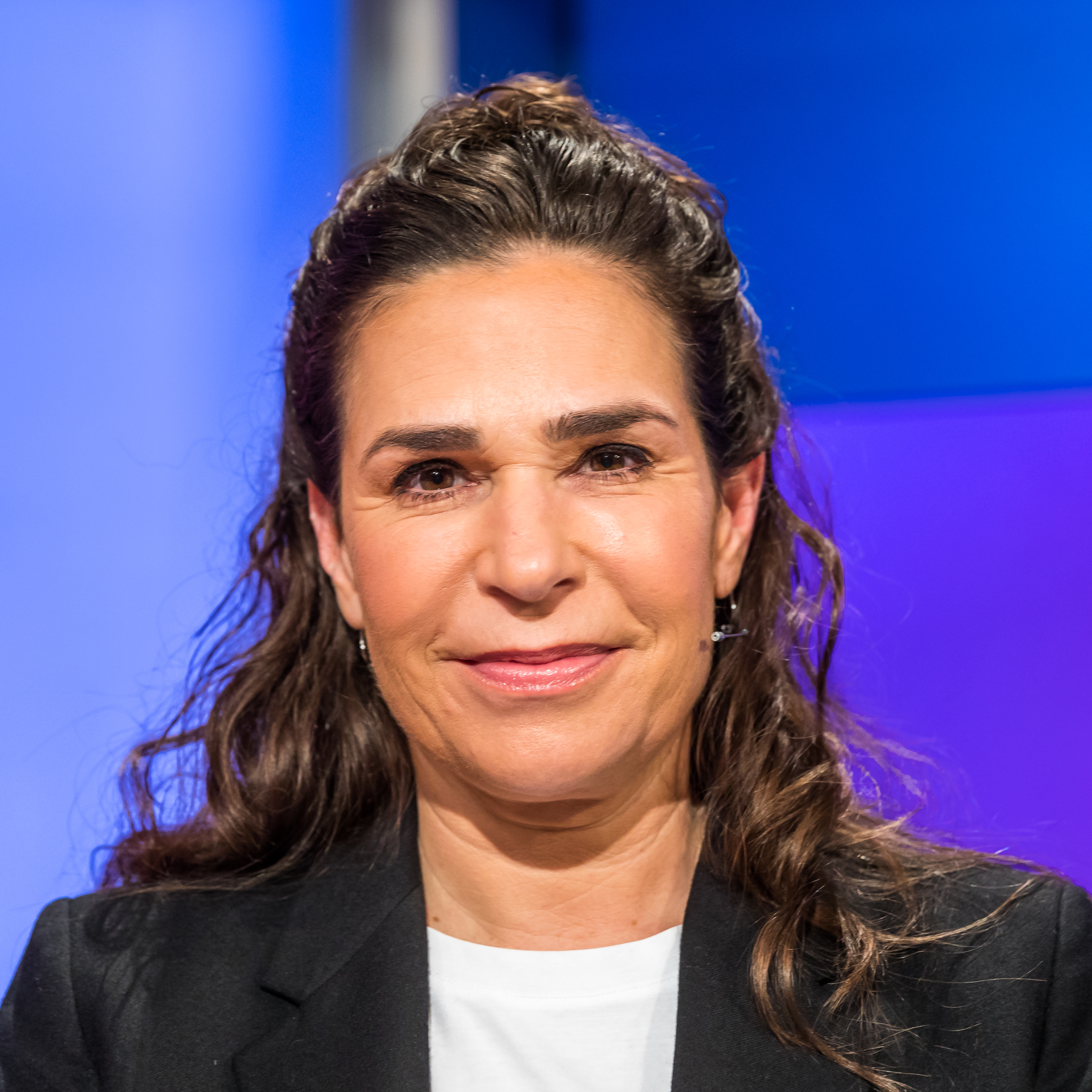
- Rosenfeld in 2023
- Born: Cologne
- Occupation: Journalist
- Spouse: Christian Lindner

Dagmar Rosenfeld (born 1974) is a German journalist.

== Life ==
After graduating from the Liebfrauenschule Köln and studying German and history at the University of Cologne, Rosenfeld volunteered at the Berliner Tagesspiegel. Subsequently, she worked there as an editor in the economic department, then in the political department and was responsible for "page two". In 2009, Rosenfeld moved to the capital office of the time, where she last wrote for the political department.

She is the sister of the writer Astrid Rosenfeld. From 2011, she was married to Christian Lindner, then General Secretary and today's chairman of the Free Democratic Party (FDP), with whom she had previously been in a relationship since 2009. The couple separated in 2018.

== Reviews ==
In late 2017, the self-regulatory body German Press Council issued a disapproval of Die Welt: Deputy editor Dagmar Rosenfeld had published before the federal election 2017 "styling tips for politicians" and advised, among others, the candidate of the FDP, Christian Lindner:

When choosing the outerwear for commercials in the future, ask the wife.

However, since Rosenfeld herself was the wife, the press council attested to "an objective bias on the journalist."
