= German balanced budget amendment =

Fiscal rule in Germany

Germany's balanced budget amendment, also referred to as the debt brake (German: Schuldenbremse), is a fiscal rule enacted in 2009 by the First Merkel cabinet, following the Swiss example. The law, which is in Article 109, paragraph 3 and Article 115 of the Basic Law, Germany's constitution, is designed to restrict structural budget deficits at the federal level and limit the issuance of government debt. The rule restricts annual structural deficits to 0.35% of GDP.

The debt brake is controversial among economists. It is supported by a German strand of economics, ordoliberalism, while other economists have challenged the rule. In 2024, amid a stagnating German economy, Bundesbank president Joachim Nagel called on the German government to reform the debt brake in order to finance structural investments in the German economy. The debt brake has been amended twice since enactment, in 2022 and in 2025, both under the Scholz cabinet in the 21st Bundestag and both for the purpose of significantly increasing defense spending.

== History ==
The amendment was enacted because the nation's debt-to-GDP ratio exceeded the 60% threshold fixed in the Maastricht Treaty, primarily a result of the heavy payments to reconstruct former communist Eastern Germany after reunification and a loss of tax revenue during the Great Recession. The law required a change to the constitution and in 2009, it was approved with a two-thirds majority both by the Bundestag and the Bundesrat, under the Grand coalition of the First Merkel cabinet. At the federal level, the law limited the budget deficit to 0.35% of the GDP beginning in 2016 and German states that approved the law were prohibited from taking on debt after 2020. Three states, Berlin, Mecklenburg-Vorpommern and Schleswig-Holstein, did not establish the law in their constitutions. In the years prior to the Covid pandemic, the law helped reduce Germany's debt to 59.5% of GDP. The balanced budget amendment is not absolute and allows the country to exceed the borrowing limits during a national emergency or a recession.

The amendment was suspended in 2020 to allow the country to deal with the costs of the COVID-19 pandemic in Germany and was set to come back into force in 2023.

Although the mechanism was successful in its stated goal, reducing government borrowing, it was criticized by left-of-center parties including the Social Democrats and the Greens, which suggested that the law limited necessary government investment. During the 2021 German federal election campaign, the Greens proposed reforming the rule to allow spending on infrastructure, healthcare and education.

=== 2022 amendment ===
In 2022, the government, led by Chancellor Olaf Scholz, succeeded in obtaining the two-thirds majority necessary to amend the debt ceiling to allow Germany to establish a €100 billion defense fund that would not be subject to the restrictions, adding Paragraph 87a to the Basic Law. The change was spurred by the 2022 Russian invasion of Ukraine. The amendment was passed by the Bundestag 568-96, with 20 abstentions. On 10 June 2022, the amendment was passed by the Bundesrat.

=== 2021-2023 budget ===
In December 2021, via an amendment to the original budget for 2021, the ruling traffic light coalition reallocated €60 billion of unused funds intended to combat the COVID-19 pandemic to its Climate and Transformation Fund (KTF) for climate and green industry projects. On November 15, 2023, the Federal Constitutional Court, having been prompted by the opposition CDU/CSU conservative alliance, ruled this maneuver to be unconstitutional. The ruling prompted a discussion about whether the amendment in its current form would still be appropriate, with even some conservatives calling for a reform to raise the relatively weak level of investment, compared to European neighbors, which had prevailed for several years. On November 27, the cabinet agreed to extend the lifting of the amendment to 2023.

=== 2025 amendment ===
Vote to reform the debt brake
Party	Yes	No	Not voting
SDP	205	1	1
CDU/CSU	193	1	2
Greens	112	1	4
FDP	0	87	3
AfD	0	73	3
The Left	0	28	0
BSW	0	9	1
Independent	1	6	1
SSW	1	0	0
Total votes	✓ 512	206	15
Percentage	71.3%	28.6%	

Following the 2025 German federal election and during negotiations for the next German cabinet, CDU/CSU leader Friedrich Merz and outgoing Chancellor Olaf Scholz reached an agreement on reforming the debt brake by amending Paragraphs 109, 115 and 143h of the Basic Law in order to exempt defense spending over 1% of GDP and a second special fund of over €500 billion for infrastructure. Merz, who had disavowed any intention to reform the debt brake during the election campaign, cited the ongoing Russo-Ukrainian War as well as the recent downturn in relations between the United States and the European Union under the Second presidency of Donald Trump. In negotiations for the vote, the Greens secured a promise for €100 billion from the infrastructure fund going towards a climate and economic transformation fund as well as the enshrinement of climate neutrality into the federal constitution, announcing their support for the amendment on 13 March.

On 18 March 2025, the Bundestag voted 512-206 in favor of the proposed amendment, sending it to the Bundesrat, where it would have to pass by two-thirds in order to become law.

The Bundestag vote on reforming Germany’s constitutional debt brake received broad cross-party support. The reform was supported by mainstream parties across ideological lines, while opposition came primarily from anti-establishment parties. The SPD, CDU/CSU and Greens all overwhelmingly voted in favor of the reform. The SSW also supported the reform. The FDP, AfD, The Left and the BSW unanimously opposed the reform.

On 21 March 2025, the Bundesrat voted in favor of the amendment 53-16, passing the two-thirds threshold to become law. The states of Brandenburg, Saxony-Anhalt, Thuringia, and Rhineland-Palatinate all abstained from voting, which was counted as voting in opposition. The Free Voters of Bavaria, which initially voiced objections to the amendment, ultimately voted in favor as a bloc.

The timing of the vote reflected strategic urgency from Friedrich Merz, as the new Bundestag, following the 2025 election, was set to convene by March 25. After this date, the AfD and The Left would have gained the blocking power needed to halt the reforms. Court challenges from AfD, FDP, and The Left failed to stop the vote.

== Discourse ==
The German debt brake has been both lauded and criticized by economists and policymakers alike. Critics argue that the debt brake constrains the government's ability to respond flexibly to economic downturns. Moreover, some contend that the strict austerity measures enforced by the debt brake hinders long-term growth prospects by causing underinvesting in infrastructure, education, and innovation.

=== The German Council of Economic Experts (GCEE) ===
The German Council of Economic Experts (GCEE) has advocated for a pragmatic reform aimed at enhancing the flexibility of fiscal policy while safeguarding debt sustainability. Firstly, they propose spreading the process of returning the structural deficit to its regular limit over multiple years following the application of the exception clause. Secondly, they suggest that the annual limit for the structural deficit should be contingent upon the level of debt. If the debt falls below a specified threshold, a higher structural deficit would be permissible. Lastly, the experts recommend methodological changes in estimating potential output, a crucial part of calculating the structural deficit.

=== Discourse among German economists ===
The debt brake has been controversial since its introduction. At that time numerous German economists spoke out against the introduction of the debt brake in a public letter. German professors remain divided about this issue. A recent report from the Ifo Institut in Munich shows that 48% of economics professors oppose a reform of the debt brake, 44% support a reform, and 6% want to abolish it all together. 2% of economists are undecided.

=== Positions of Germany's major parties ===
The Schuldenbremse, or debt brake, has been a pivotal point of contention among major German political parties, displaying diverse economic perspectives on fiscal policy. The positions of these parties regarding the debt brake demonstrate their differing priorities, concerns, and approaches to managing public finances.

==== CDU/CSU ====
The conservative parties, CDU/CSU have historically been a strong advocate of the debt brake. They view it as a necessary tool for maintaining fiscal discipline and ensuring the long-term sustainability of public finances. For the CDU/CSU, the debt brake represents a commitment to responsible governance, as it limits the accumulation of government debt and promotes balanced budgets. They argue that reducing government borrowing fosters economic stability, encourages private sector investment, and ultimately strengthens Germany's position within the European Union. Moreover, the CDU/CSU emphasises the importance of honouring budgetary commitments to future generations, framing the debt brake as a mechanism to safeguard their interests.

At the start of 2024 a debate has sparked within the CDU about a reform of the debt brake. Friedrich Merz, head of the CDU, has recently advocated for debt brake reform.

==== FDP ====
The Free Democratic Party (FDP) generally supports the debt brake, with some reservations. While the FDP acknowledges the importance of fiscal responsibility, it advocates for a more flexible interpretation of the debt brake to accommodate economic fluctuations and crises. The party emphasizes the need to strike a balance between debt reduction and strategic investments in areas such as infrastructure, education, and innovation. Also, the FDP advocates for structural reforms aimed at enhancing Germany's economic competitiveness and productivity, viewing them as essential for achieving sustainable budgetary outcomes in the long run.

==== SPD ====
The Social Democratic Party (SPD) has a nuanced relationship with the debt brake. While the SPD initially supported its implementation, the party has since become divided over its effectiveness and implications. Some rather conservative factions within the SPD remain supportive of the debt brake, arguing that it promotes fiscal discipline and credibility in financial markets. However, other more left-leaning parts of the party criticize its firm framework and argue that it negatively influences the government's ability to respond effectively to economic downturns or invest in green technologies and welfare programs. These critics advocate for reforms to make the debt brake more flexible.

==== Bündnis 90/Die Grünen ====
Bündnis 90/Die Grünen has also expressed mixed views on the debt brake. While the party recognizes the importance of sustainable fiscal policy, it raises concerns about the social and environmental implications of austerity measures enforced by the debt brake. Bündnis 90/Die Grünen emphasizes the need for investments in renewable energy and climate adaptation to address the looming threat of climate change. They argue that prioritising debt reduction over these priorities neglects crucial long-term investments in sustainability and economic growth.

In 2024, Danyal Bayaz, Minister of Finance of Baden-Württemberg, criticized the federal German government for squandering the “globalisation dividend” of the past 15 years by failing to make public investment during a period of low interest rates.

==== Die Linke ====
The Left Party (Die Linke) opposes the debt brake altogether, viewing it as a neoliberal austerity measure that undermines social welfare and intensifies inequality. Die Linke advocates for alternative approaches to fiscal policy that prioritize public investment, wealth redistribution, and social justice. They argue that austerity measures enforced by the debt brake disproportionately impact marginalised communities and slow down efforts to achieve inclusive and sustainable economic development.

==== AfD ====
The far-right party AfD (Alternative for Germany) is in favor of the debt-brake.

== See also ==
- Debt-to-GDP ratio
- Structural and cyclical deficit
- Government budget balance
- Government-Household analogy
