= Hochtaunus =

Federal electoral district of Germany

175 Hochtaunus
- Electoral district for the Bundestag
- Hochtaunus in 2025
- State: Hesse
- Population: 252,300 (2019)
- Electorate: 179,842 (2021)
- Major settlements: Bad Homburg vor der Höhe; Oberursel (Taunus); Friedrichsdorf
- Area: 812.5 km^{2}

Current electoral district
- Created: 1949
- Party: CDU
- Member: Markus Koob
- Elected: 2013, 2017, 2021, 2025

Hochtaunus is an electoral constituency (German: Wahlkreis) represented in the Bundestag. It elects one member via first-past-the-post voting. Under the current constituency numbering system, it is designated as constituency 175. It is located in southwestern Hesse, comprising most of Hochtaunuskreis and the northeastern part of the Limburg-Weilburg district.

Hochtaunus was created for the inaugural 1949 federal election. Since 2013, it has been represented by Markus Koob of the Christian Democratic Union (CDU).

== Geography ==
Hochtaunus is located in southwestern Hesse. As of the 2021 federal election, it comprises the entirety of the Hochtaunuskreis district excluding the municipalities of Königstein im Taunus, Kronberg im Taunus, and Steinbach (Taunus), as well as the municipalities of Beselich, Löhnberg, Mengerskirchen, Merenberg, Runkel, Villmar, Weilburg, Weilmünster, and Weinbach from the Limburg-Weilburg district.

== History ==
Hochtaunus was created in 1949, then known as Obertaunuskreis. In the 1972 election, it was named Obertaunuskreis (Hochtaunuskreis). It acquired its current name in the 1976 election. In the 1949 election, it was Hesse constituency 10 in the numbering system. From 1953 through 1976, it was number 135. From 1980 through 1998, it was number 133. In the 2002 and 2005 elections, it was number 177. In the 2009 through 2021 elections, it was number 176. From the 2025 election, it has been number 175.

Originally, the constituency comprised the districts of Oberlahnkreis, Obertaunuskreis, and Usingen. From 1976 through 1998, it comprised the Hochtaunuskreis district, the municipalities of Beselich, Löhnberg, Mengerskirchen, Merenberg, Runkel, Villmar, Weilburg, Weilmünster, and Weinbach from the Limburg-Weilburg district, and the municipalities of Eppstein and Kelkheim from the Main-Taunus-Kreis district. It acquired its current borders in the 2002 election.

Election	No.	Name	Borders
1949	10	Obertaunuskreis	Oberlahnkreis district; Obertaunuskreis district; Usingen district
1953	135	Obertaunuskreis	Oberlahnkreis district; Obertaunuskreis district; Usingen district
1957	135	Obertaunuskreis	Oberlahnkreis district; Obertaunuskreis district; Usingen district
1961	135	Obertaunuskreis	Oberlahnkreis district; Obertaunuskreis district; Usingen district
1965	135	Obertaunuskreis	Oberlahnkreis district; Obertaunuskreis district; Usingen district
1969	135	Obertaunuskreis	Oberlahnkreis district; Obertaunuskreis district; Usingen district
1972	135	Obertaunuskreis (Hochtaunuskreis)	Oberlahnkreis district; Obertaunuskreis district; Usingen district
1976	135	Hochtaunuskreis	Hochtaunuskreis district; Limburg-Weilburg district (only Beselich, Löhnberg, Mengerskirchen, Merenberg, Runkel, Villmar, Weilburg, Weilmünster, and Weinbach municipalities); Main-Taunus-Kreis district (only Eppstein and Kelkheim municipalities)
1980	133	Hochtaunuskreis	Hochtaunuskreis district; Limburg-Weilburg district (only Beselich, Löhnberg, Mengerskirchen, Merenberg, Runkel, Villmar, Weilburg, Weilmünster, and Weinbach municipalities); Main-Taunus-Kreis district (only Eppstein and Kelkheim municipalities)
1983	133	Hochtaunuskreis	Hochtaunuskreis district; Limburg-Weilburg district (only Beselich, Löhnberg, Mengerskirchen, Merenberg, Runkel, Villmar, Weilburg, Weilmünster, and Weinbach municipalities); Main-Taunus-Kreis district (only Eppstein and Kelkheim municipalities)
1987	133	Hochtaunuskreis	Hochtaunuskreis district; Limburg-Weilburg district (only Beselich, Löhnberg, Mengerskirchen, Merenberg, Runkel, Villmar, Weilburg, Weilmünster, and Weinbach municipalities); Main-Taunus-Kreis district (only Eppstein and Kelkheim municipalities)
1990	133	Hochtaunuskreis	Hochtaunuskreis district; Limburg-Weilburg district (only Beselich, Löhnberg, Mengerskirchen, Merenberg, Runkel, Villmar, Weilburg, Weilmünster, and Weinbach municipalities); Main-Taunus-Kreis district (only Eppstein and Kelkheim municipalities)
1994	133	Hochtaunuskreis	Hochtaunuskreis district; Limburg-Weilburg district (only Beselich, Löhnberg, Mengerskirchen, Merenberg, Runkel, Villmar, Weilburg, Weilmünster, and Weinbach municipalities); Main-Taunus-Kreis district (only Eppstein and Kelkheim municipalities)
1998	133	Hochtaunuskreis	Hochtaunuskreis district; Limburg-Weilburg district (only Beselich, Löhnberg, Mengerskirchen, Merenberg, Runkel, Villmar, Weilburg, Weilmünster, and Weinbach municipalities); Main-Taunus-Kreis district (only Eppstein and Kelkheim municipalities)
2002	177	Hochtaunuskreis	Hochtaunuskreis district (excluding Königstein im Taunus, Kronberg im Taunus, and Steinbach (Taunus) municipalities); Limburg-Weilburg district (only Beselich, Löhnberg, Mengerskirchen, Merenberg, Runkel, Villmar, Weilburg, Weilmünster, and Weinbach municipalities)
2005	177	Hochtaunuskreis	Hochtaunuskreis district (excluding Königstein im Taunus, Kronberg im Taunus, and Steinbach (Taunus) municipalities); Limburg-Weilburg district (only Beselich, Löhnberg, Mengerskirchen, Merenberg, Runkel, Villmar, Weilburg, Weilmünster, and Weinbach municipalities)
2009	176	Hochtaunuskreis	Hochtaunuskreis district (excluding Königstein im Taunus, Kronberg im Taunus, and Steinbach (Taunus) municipalities); Limburg-Weilburg district (only Beselich, Löhnberg, Mengerskirchen, Merenberg, Runkel, Villmar, Weilburg, Weilmünster, and Weinbach municipalities)
2013	176	Hochtaunuskreis	Hochtaunuskreis district (excluding Königstein im Taunus, Kronberg im Taunus, and Steinbach (Taunus) municipalities); Limburg-Weilburg district (only Beselich, Löhnberg, Mengerskirchen, Merenberg, Runkel, Villmar, Weilburg, Weilmünster, and Weinbach municipalities)
2017	176	Hochtaunuskreis	Hochtaunuskreis district (excluding Königstein im Taunus, Kronberg im Taunus, and Steinbach (Taunus) municipalities); Limburg-Weilburg district (only Beselich, Löhnberg, Mengerskirchen, Merenberg, Runkel, Villmar, Weilburg, Weilmünster, and Weinbach municipalities)
2021	176	Hochtaunuskreis	Hochtaunuskreis district (excluding Königstein im Taunus, Kronberg im Taunus, and Steinbach (Taunus) municipalities); Limburg-Weilburg district (only Beselich, Löhnberg, Mengerskirchen, Merenberg, Runkel, Villmar, Weilburg, Weilmünster, and Weinbach municipalities)
2025	175	Hochtaunuskreis	Hochtaunuskreis district (excluding Königstein im Taunus, Kronberg im Taunus, and Steinbach (Taunus) municipalities); Limburg-Weilburg district (only Beselich, Löhnberg, Mengerskirchen, Merenberg, Runkel, Villmar, Weilburg, Weilmünster, and Weinbach municipalities)

== Members ==
The constituency was represented by six different members in the first six terms of the Bundestag: Heinrich Müller of the Social Democratic Party (SPD) from 1949 to 1953, Erich Köhler of the Christian Democratic Union (CDU) from 1953 to 1957, Berthold Martin of the CDU from 1957 to 1961, Kurt Gscheidle of the SPD from 1961 to 1965, Walther Leisler Kiep of the CDU from 1965 to 1969, and Dietrich Sperling of the SPD from 1969 to 1973. Sperling was re-elected in 1972. Manfred Langner won the constituency for the CDU in 1976 and served until 1990, when he was succeeded by fellow party member Bärbel Sothmann. Holger Haibach served from 2002 to 2013. Markus Koob was elected in 2013, and re-elected in 2017 and 2021.

Election	Member	Party	%
1949	Heinrich Müller	SPD	30.7
1953	Erich Köhler	CDU	34.4
1957	Berthold Martin	CDU	46.0
1961	Kurt Gscheidle	SPD	40.3
1965	Walther Leisler Kiep	CDU	48.1
1969	Dietrich Sperling	SPD	47.0
1972	Dietrich Sperling	SPD	47.7
1976	Manfred Langner	CDU	50.7
1980	Manfred Langner	CDU	46.5
1983	Manfred Langner	CDU	53.5
1987	Manfred Langner	CDU	50.5
1990	Bärbel Sothmann	CDU	48.4
1994	Bärbel Sothmann	CDU	50.8
1998	Bärbel Sothmann	CDU	46.5
2002	Holger Haibach	CDU	43.7
2005	Holger Haibach	CDU	45.1
2009	Holger Haibach	CDU	45.2
2013	Markus Koob	CDU	48.8
2017	Markus Koob	CDU	39.9
2021	Markus Koob	CDU	31.3
2025	Markus Koob	CDU	37.8

== Election results ==
=== 2025 election ===
Federal election (2025): Hochtaunus
Notes:	Blue background denotes the winner of the electorate vote. Pink background denotes a candidate elected from their party list. Yellow background denotes an electorate win by a list member, or other incumbent. A ✓ or ✗ denotes status of any incumbent, win or lose respectively.						
Party	Candidate	Votes	%	±%	Party votes	%	±%
CDU	✓ Markus Koob	57,261	37.8	▲6.6	50,934	33.6	▲7.4
SPD	David Wade	29,458	19.5	▼7.5	25,252	16.6	▼8.0
AfD	Clemens Hauk	25,045	16.5	▲9.0	24,855	16.4	▲8.6
Greens	Christian Tramnitz	18,418	12.2	▼3.1	19,814	13.1	▼2.7
Left	André Pabst	8,108	5.4	▲2.7	9,353	6.2	▲3.1
FDP	Katja Adler	7,275	4.8	▼6.5	9,963	6.6	▼8.8
BSW					5,645	3.7	New
FW	Guido Becker	3,299	2.2	▼0.2	1,828	1.2	▼0.4
Tierschutzpartei					1,772	1.2	▼0.3
Volt	Tobias Raum	2,495	1.6	New	1,291	0.9	▲0.4
PARTEI					630	0.4	▼0.3
BD					216	0.1	New
Humanists					120	0.1	0.0
MLPD					31	<0.1	0.0
Informal votes		1,346			1,001		
Total valid votes		151,359			151,704		
Turnout		152,705	85.6	▲5.5			
CDU hold	Majority	27,803	18.3	▲14.0			

=== 2021 election ===
Federal election (2021): Hochtaunus
Notes:	Blue background denotes the winner of the electorate vote. Pink background denotes a candidate elected from their party list. Yellow background denotes an electorate win by a list member, or other incumbent. A ✓ or ✗ denotes status of any incumbent, win or lose respectively.						
Party	Candidate	Votes	%	±%	Party votes	%	±%
CDU	✓ Markus Koob	44,549	31.3	▼8.6	37,331	26.2	▼7.3
SPD	Alicia Bokler	38,424	27.0	▲4.0	35,171	24.6	▲4.6
Greens	Christian Tramnitz	21,769	15.3	▲6.4	22,486	15.8	▲6.0
FDP	Katja Adler	16,132	11.3	▲1.0	21,996	15.4	▲0.4
AfD	Henning Thöne	10,709	7.5	▼2.9	11,156	7.8	▼3.3
Left	André Pabst	3,772	2.6	▼3.3	4,441	3.1	▼3.5
FW	Hubert Horn	3,369	2.4	▲1.0	2,246	1.6	▲0.8
Tierschutzpartei					2,026	1.4	▲0.2
dieBasis	Thomas Schumbert	2,347	1.6		1,880	1.3	
PARTEI					1,053	0.7	0.0
Pirates	Carsten Baums	1,385	1.0		739	0.5	▲0.2
Volt					594	0.4	
Team Todenhöfer					533	0.4	
Gesundheitsforschung					200	0.1	
NPD					155	0.1	▼0.2
Humanists					148	0.1	
V-Partei3					128	0.1	▼0.1
ÖDP					127	0.1	▼0.1
Bündnis C					113	0.1	
Bündnis 21					68	0.0	
LKR					47	0.0	
DKP					32	0.0	0.0
MLPD					12	0.0	0.0
Informal votes		1,556			1,330		
Total valid votes		142,456			142,682		
Turnout		144,012	80.1	▼0.5			
CDU hold	Majority	6,125	4.3	▼12.6			

=== 2017 election ===
Federal election (2017): Hochtaunus
Notes:	Blue background denotes the winner of the electorate vote. Pink background denotes a candidate elected from their party list. Yellow background denotes an electorate win by a list member, or other incumbent. A ✓ or ✗ denotes status of any incumbent, win or lose respectively.						
Party	Candidate	Votes	%	±%	Party votes	%	±%
CDU	✓ Markus Koob	57,579	39.9	▼8.8	48,436	33.5	▼9.5
SPD	Hans-Joachim Schabedoth	33,201	23.0	▼5.0	28,947	20.0	▼4.7
AfD	Andreas John Lichert	15,075	10.4	▲4.8	16,132	11.2	▲4.3
FDP	Stefan Ruppert	14,954	10.4	▲6.8	21,713	15.0	▲7.5
Greens	Wolfgang Schmitt	12,884	8.9	▲1.6	14,074	9.7	▲0.5
Left	Silvia Lehmann	8,556	5.9	▲1.9	9,562	6.6	▲2.0
Tierschutzpartei					1,751	1.2	
FW	Peter Schüppenhauer	2,011	1.4		1,090	0.8	▲0.1
PARTEI					1,079	0.7	▲0.4
Pirates					476	0.3	▼1.3
NPD					388	0.3	▼0.5
BGE					238	0.2	
V-Partei³					222	0.2	
ÖDP					218	0.2	
DM					202	0.1	
MLPD					31	0.0	0.0
BüSo					26	0.0	0.0
DKP					24	0.0	
Informal votes		2,055			1,706		
Total valid votes		144,260			144,609		
Turnout		146,315	80.6	▲3.8			
CDU hold	Majority	24,378	16.9	▼3.8			

=== 2013 election ===
Federal election (2013): Hochtaunus
Notes:	Blue background denotes the winner of the electorate vote. Pink background denotes a candidate elected from their party list. Yellow background denotes an electorate win by a list member, or other incumbent. A ✓ or ✗ denotes status of any incumbent, win or lose respectively.						
Party	Candidate	Votes	%	±%	Party votes	%	±%
CDU	Markus Koob	66,785	48.8	▲3.5	58,822	43.0	▲7.0
SPD	Hans-Joachim Schabedoth	38,435	28.1	▲2.7	33,846	24.7	▲3.3
Greens	Jutta Bruns	10,064	7.3	▼2.0	12,690	9.3	▼2.2
AfD	Konrad Adam	7,748	5.7		9,447	6.9	
Left	Steffen Etzel	5,482	4.0	▼1.4	6,358	4.6	▼2.0
FDP	Stefan Ruppert	4,866	3.6	▼8.2	10,334	7.5	▼12.6
Pirates	Sascha Neugebauer	2,194	1.6		2,266	1.7	▼0.2
NPD	Patrick Huth	934	0.7	▼0.1	1,024	0.7	0.0
FW					876	0.6	
PARTEI					510	0.4	
REP	Helmar Zeeh	467	0.3	▼0.3	469	0.3	▼0.2
PRO					134	0.1	
BüSo					51	0.0	▼0.1
SGP					38	0.0	
MLPD					18	0.0	0.0
Informal votes		2,911			3,003		
Total valid votes		136,975			136,883		
Turnout		139,886	76.8	▼0.6			
CDU hold	Majority	28,350	20.7	▲0.9			

=== 2009 election ===
Federal election (2009): Hochtaunus
Notes:	Blue background denotes the winner of the electorate vote. Pink background denotes a candidate elected from their party list. Yellow background denotes an electorate win by a list member, or other incumbent. A ✓ or ✗ denotes status of any incumbent, win or lose respectively.						
Party	Candidate	Votes	%	±%	Party votes	%	±%
CDU	✓ Holger Haibach	62,748	45.2	▲0.1	49,902	35.9	▼1.4
SPD	Hans-Joachim Schabedoth	35,257	25.4	▼10.2	29,758	21.4	▼8.2
FDP	Stefan Ruppert	16,255	11.7	▲2.7	27,979	20.1	▲4.6
Greens	Norman Dießner	12,976	9.4	▲4.3	15,877	11.4	▲1.6
Left	Steffen Etzel	7,522	5.4	▲1.6	9,229	6.6	▲2.1
Pirates					2,552	1.8	
Tierschutzpartei	Sigrid Wellmann	2,074	1.5		1,472	1.1	▲0.3
NPD	Josephine Fröhlich	1,081	0.8	▼0.5	1,055	0.8	▼0.2
REP	Kim Nowak	862	0.6		807	0.6	▼0.2
BüSo					127	0.1	0.0
DVU					74	0.1	
MLPD					26	0.0	0.0
Informal votes		2,300			2,217		
Total valid votes		138,775			138,858		
Turnout		141,075	77.4	▼4.3			
CDU hold	Majority	27,491	19.8	▲10.3			

=== 2005 election ===
Federal election (2005):Hochtaunus
Notes:	Blue background denotes the winner of the electorate vote. Pink background denotes a candidate elected from their party list. Yellow background denotes an electorate win by a list member, or other incumbent. A ✓ or ✗ denotes status of any incumbent, win or lose respectively.						
Party	Candidate	Votes	%	±%	Party votes	%	±%
CDU	✓ Holger Haibach	65,756	45.4	▲1.4	54,583	37.4	▼4.4
SPD	Frank Schmidt	51,838	35.6	▼4.7	43,215	29.6	▼4.5
FDP	Wolfgang Gerhardt	13,207	9.1	0.0	22,741	15.6	▲5.7
Greens	Omid Nouripour	7,409	5.1	▲0.3	14,373	9.8	▼0.8
Left	Hermann Schaus	5,614	3.9	▲2.9	6,655	4.6	▲3.4
NPD	Ellen Scherer	1,925	1.3		1,370	0.9	▲0.7
REP					1,091	0.7	0.0
Tierschutzpartei					1,091	0.7	▲0.2
GRAUEN					655	0.4	▲0.3
SGP					116	0.1	
BüSo					107	0.1	▲0.3
MLPD					42	0.0	
Informal votes		2,886			2,596		
Total valid votes		145,749			146,039		
Turnout		148,635	81.7	▼0.5			
CDU hold	Majority	13,918	9.5				
