= Gießen-Koblenz Lahn Valley =

The Gießen-Koblenz Lahn Valley is a bowl in western Hesse and eastern Rhineland-Palatinate in Germany that contains the lower course of the Lahn as well as the Limburg Basin. It falls within natural region no. 31 as defined by the BfN. It extends from Leun to the mouth of the Lahn into the river Rhine near Lahnstein. Despite its name it does not reach as far east as Gießen, but ends west of Wetzlar.

== Natural divisions ==
- 310 Lower Lahn Valley
- 311 Limburg Basin
  - 311.0 North Limburg Basin Hills
    - 311.00 Ahlbach Börde Plateau
    - 311.01 Elz-Hadamar Basin Edge
    - 311.02 Schupbach-Hof Edge Plateau
  - 311.1 Inner Limburg Basin
    - 311.10 Linter Plateau
    - 311.11 Villmar Basin
    - 311.12 Runkel Lahn Valley Region
    - 311.13 Limburg Lahn Valley Region
    - 311.14 Diezer Pforte
  - 311.2 South Limburg Basin Hills
- 312 Weilburg Lahn Valley Region
  - 312.0 Gaudernbach Plateau
  - 312.1 Weilburg Lahn Valley
    - 312.11 Löhnberg Valley Region
    - 312.12 Weilburg-Aumenau Lahn Valley
  - 312.2 Edelsberg-Braunfels Plateau
    - 312.21 Braunfels Plateau
    - 312.22 Edelsberg Plateau

The Gießen-Koblenz Lahn Valley region is the western extension of the Marburg-Gießen Lahn Valley region (major unit 348). It continues to the west into the Moselle Valley (major unit 25), which separates it from the Middle Rhine Region (29). To the north it is bordered by the Westerwald and to the south by the Hintertaunus.
