= Walther Leisler Kiep =

German politician (1926–2016)

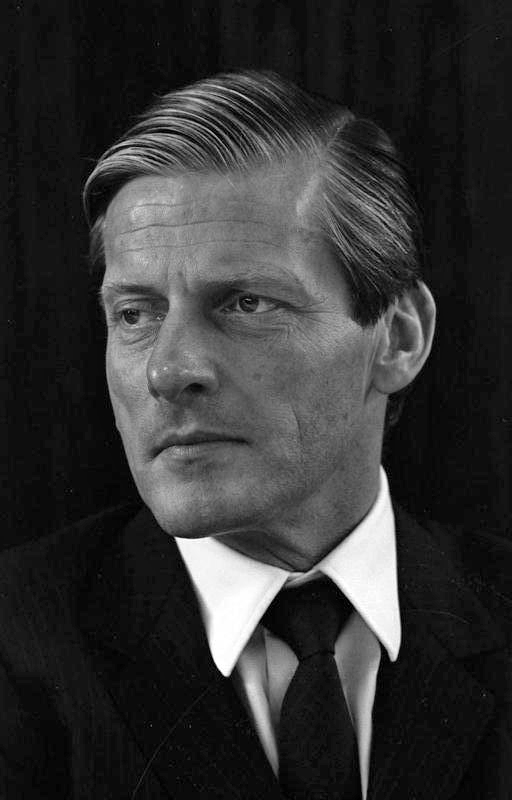
- Kiep in 1973

Member of the Bundestag
- In office 4 November 1980 – 26 April 1982
- Preceded by: Multi-member district
- Succeeded by: Herbert Lattmann
- Constituency: Lower Saxony state list
- In office 19 October 1965 – 24 February 1976
- Preceded by: Kurt Gscheidle
- Succeeded by: Erna-Maria Geier
- Constituency: Obertaunuskreis (1965–1969); Hesse state list (1969–1976)
Lower Saxony offices
Minister for Finance of Lower Saxony
In office 25 February 1976 – 4 November 1980
Minister-President	Ernst Albrecht
Preceded by	Ernst Albrecht
Succeeded by	Ernst Albrecht (acting); Burkhard Ritz
Minister for Economic Affairs and Transport of Lower Saxony
In office 25 February 1976 – 19 January 1977
Minister-President	Ernst Albrecht
Preceded by	Ernst Albrecht
Succeeded by	Erich Küpker
Member of the Landtag of Lower Saxony
In office 21 June 1978 – 4 November 1980
Preceded by	Multi-member district
Succeeded by	Reinhard Briese
Constituency	State list

Personal details
- Born: Walther Gottlieb Louis Leisler Kiep; 5 January 1926 Hamburg, Germany
- Died: 9 May 2016 (aged 90) Kronberg im Taunus, Germany
- Party: Christian Democratic Union
- Other political affiliations: Nazi Party (1944–1945)
- Spouse: Charlotte ter Meer (m. 1950)
- Children: 4
- Relatives: Walther vom Rath (grandfather); Otto Kiep (uncle); Emilie Kiep-Altenloh (aunt)
- Occupation: Insurance salesman

Walther Gottlieb Louis Leisler Kiep (5 January 1926 – 9 May 2016) was a German politician of the Christian Democratic Union (CDU). He was a member of the Bundestag between 1965 and 1976 and again from 1980 to 1982. After switching to state-level politics, he served as minister of economy (1976–77) and minister of finance (1976–80) in Lower Saxony under Ernst Albrecht. In 1982, Kiep was the leading candidate for the CDU in two successive state elections in Hamburg, losing both to incumbent Klaus von Dohnányi. From 1971 until 1992, he was treasurer of his party at the federal level. In this position, Kiep installed a system of unreported income accounts, leading to the CDU donations scandal in 1999.

== Early life and education ==
Coming from a liberal family, Kiep was born on 5 January 1926 in Hamburg to Louis Leisler Kiep, a navy captain and business man, and Eugenie Maria Anna vom Rath. Kiep's maternal grandfather, Walther vom Rath, had been a member of the Prussian House of Representatives from 1894 to 1898 and later a member of the Prussian House of Lords until 1918. His middle name "Leisler" came from Jacob Leisler, a German-born colonist and ancestor of Kiep, who participated in early independence movements in New York and was hanged by the English in 1691. Kiep went to school in Hamburg and Istanbul, achieving his Abitur in 1943 before joining the Wehrmacht. On 20 April 1944, Adolf Hitler's birthday, he joined the Nazi Party. In the same year his uncle, Otto Carl Kiep, was executed by the Nazis for his membership in the Kreisau Circle. After the war, he started to study history and economics, but did not graduate.

Before moving into politics, he worked for the Insurance Company of North America from 1948 to 1955. Starting in 1955, he worked for a company called Gradmann und Holler, an insurance broker company for large businesses. Kiep owned 15 percent of the company in 1982. His involvement with Gradmann und Holler sparked controversy. When Kiep became minister in Lower Saxony in 1976, Volkswagen and other local companies went into business with Gradmann und Holler, creating a possible conflict of interest for the minister. Kiep also served on Volkswagen's board of directors. Kiep denied abusing his power as minister, saying that the deal with Volkswagen had been financially damaging rather than profitable for his company. Due to his successful business ventures, Kiep was considered to be one of the richest politicians in Germany. In an interview, Kiep told Playboy that he could live well just from the interest from his savings.

== Political career ==
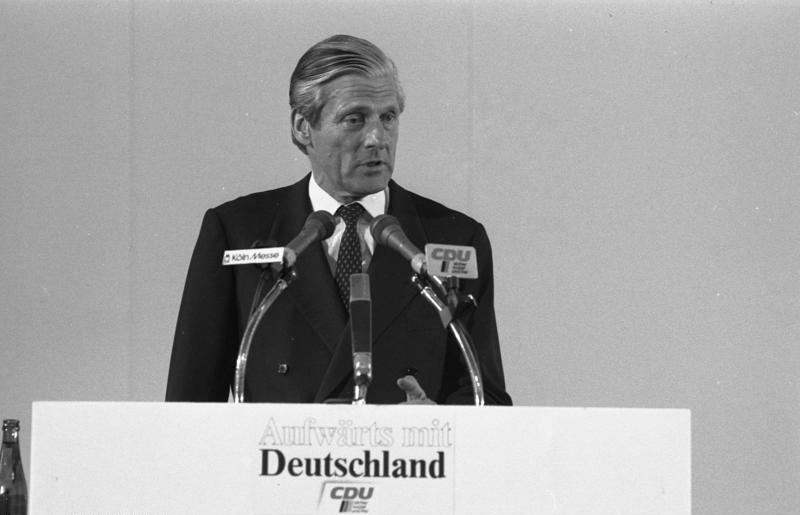
Kiep at a CDU party convention in Cologne, 1983

=== Member of parliament ===
Kiep became a member of the CDU in the fall of 1961, gaining a seat in the county council of Obertaunus in 1963. Following the 1965 federal election, he became a member of the Bundestag, winning a mandate in the Obertaunus constituency. He retained his seat in 1969 and 1972, this time as part of his party's electoral list in Hessen. In 1972, Kiep was one of only a few CDU parliamentarians who voted yes to the Basic Treaty (Grundlagenvertrag) between West and East Germany. Other supporters of Willy Brandt's Ostpolitik were Richard von Weizsäcker, Karl Carstens and Olaf von Wrangel. During the 1972 federal elections, Kiep was named as prospective Federal Minister of Economic Cooperation and Development in the shadow cabinet of Rainer Barzel. He left parliament on 24 February 1976 to join the state government in Lower Saxony. During his tenure as minister, he also held a seat in the Landtag of Lower Saxony from 1978 to 1980. He regained a seat in the Bundestag following the 1980 election, entering through a place on the electoral list for Lower Saxony. In order to concentrate on his role as leading candidate in his home state of Hamburg, he once again left parliament on 26 April 1982.

=== Minister in Lower Saxony ===
1976 saw the state government change in the German Bundesland of Lower Saxony, when the coalition government of the SPD and FDP was unable to agree on a successor to minister-president Alfred Kubel. As a consequence, the CDU used renegade votes from the government camp to elect Ernst Albrecht into office. Albrecht called Kiep into his government, as minister of economy and finance. After the CDU minority government was replaced by a coalition with the FDP in January 1977, Kiep left his position in the ministry for economy, but continued to lead the ministry of finance until 1980.

A controversial topic during his tenure as minister was the search for a radioactive waste site in Lower Saxony. In 1975, three locations had been deemed suitable for further investigation: the salt domes Lutterloh, Lichtenhorst and Wahn. Two years later, however, the state government designated the Gorleben salt dome as a single location for the repository and waste disposal center. In 2011, a commission of enquiry of the Bundestag investigated the award procedure. Journal entries of Kiep's had implied that he was the driving force behind the decision to promote Gorleben, putting the idea forward at a meeting with Albrecht and three federal ministers in Hanover on 11 November 1976. Since he had attended a meeting with delegates from the nuclear power industry on the same day, it was speculated that the lobby had exercised influence on Kiep. Appearing before the committee as a witness, Kiep claimed not to remember the events exactly but said that he considered it "unlikely" that he was the one who proposed Gorleben, because he did not have enough expertise in the matter.

Minister-president Albrecht and Kiep were prominent representatives of the liberal wing of the CDU, who aimed to move their party towards support for the Ostpolitik of the SPD/FDP federal government. In 1976, they lobbied for their party's approval of new treaties with Poland, against conservative figures such as Alfred Dregger, Franz Josef Strauß and Hans Filbinger. This was also considered to be part of a plan of CDU chairman Helmut Kohl to bring the liberal FDP back into a coalition with the Christian Democrats (which was ultimately successful in 1982). That Kiep's work was popular with the FDP was proven in early 1976: the party's Theodor Heuss foundation (de) awarded him with their highest award, which Keip refused in deference to his party affiliation.

In 1978, Kiep served as a special representative for chancellor Helmut Schmidt during a debt crisis in Turkey, mediating between the government of Bülent Ecevit, with whom he developed a friendship, and the International Monetary Fund. Kiep eventually collected 910 million US$ for Turkey from various states.

In the 1980 federal election, Kiep was named as foreign minister in the shadow cabinet of Franz Josef Strauß.

=== Candidate in Hamburg ===
In 1982, Kiep served as the leading candidate for the CDU in two separate state elections in his hometown of Hamburg. The first, regular election in June brought a majority of votes for Kiep and heavy losses for the SPD and incumbent First Mayor Klaus von Dohnányi. Since the Green Party gained enough votes to be represented in the Bürgerschaft, the political situation was at a deadlock. After von Dohnányi proved unsuccessful in forming a minority government tolerated by the Greens, new elections were called for December. Kiep was once again the CDU candidate, but in "an election upset", the SPD was able to get enough votes to form a government on their own. This was seen as a sign of support of Hamburg's population for former chancellor Helmut Schmidt (born in Hamburg), who had been replaced in a constructive vote of no confidence by the CDU in October.

=== Treasurer of the CDU and scandals ===
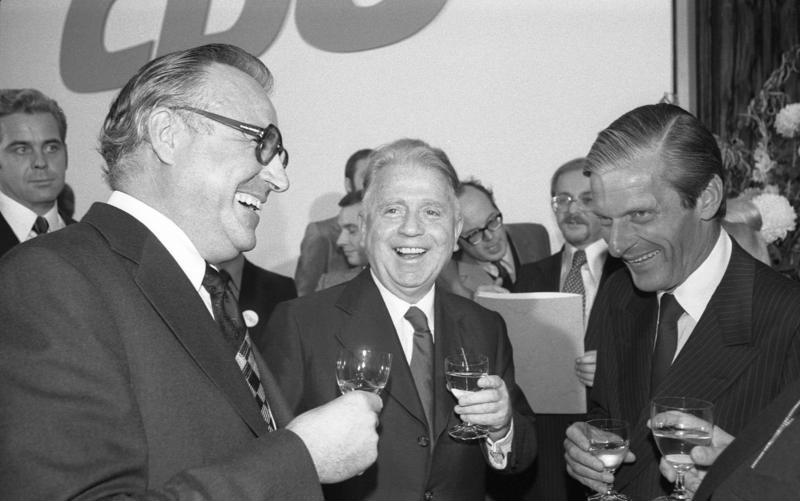
Helmut Kohl (left) and Kiep (right), two prominent figures in the CDU donations scandal, pictured in 1975

Kiep served as federal treasurer of the CDU from 1971 to 1992. During his tenure, the party was involved in several financial scandals. Shortly after taking over, Kiep brought in economist Uwe Lüthje as general agent and public accountant Horst Weyrauch as a financial consultant. Together, the three started an elaborate system aimed at accumulating funding for the party. The Staatsbürgerliche Vereinigung 1954 e.V. (de) was used by major companies to donate money to the CDU anonymously, while the donations were fully tax deductible due to the Vereinigung being considered non-profit. Just in the election year 1972, 30 million Deutsche Mark are said to have been accumulated in this fashion. Over the course of its existence, the Vereinigung gave 214 million Deutsche Marks to political parties between 1969 and 1980. The procedure was made public during the uncovering of the Flick affair in the early 1980s. Kiep was ultimately accused of having amassed 18.5 million Deutsche Marks in illegal donations for the CDU, evading nine million Deutsche Marks in taxes. For his role, he was sentenced to a payment of 675,000 Deutsche Marks in 1991, but the verdict was revoked a year later by the Federal Court of Justice.

In 1995, the public prosecution department of the city of Augsburg obtained the calendars of Karlheinz Schreiber, a German arms dealer. On 4 November 1999, the prosecution office issued an arrest warrant against Kiep, charging him with having accepted a payment of one million Deutsche Marks from Schreiber in 1991 without subjecting the money to taxes. After turning himself in a day later, Kiep declared during his interrogation that he had accepted the money, with Horst Weyrauch present, as a donation for the CDU. This started the CDU donations scandal, in which a system of illegal accounts was uncovered. On 30 November, former chancellor Helmut Kohl took full responsibility for the accounts and later admitted to having personally accepted a total sum of up to two million Deutsche Marks from anonymous sponsors, which were not declared. As a consequence of the illegal proceedings, the CDU was sentenced to a payment of 41 million Deutsche Marks by President of the Bundestag Wolfgang Thierse on 15 February 2000. Kiep was ultimately involved in several lawsuits concerning tax evasion. One was closed in January 2004, after Kiep paid a monetary condition of 75,000 Euro. In another trial in 2001, he was sentenced to pay 45,000 Deutsche Marks. In early 2004, Kiep accepted a sentence of 40,500 Euro for a false statement given at the enquiry commission on the donations scandal.

== Assassination attempt ==
On 30 November 1974, an assassination attempt was made on Kiep, during which a man fired three shots at the door of his sauna, though he remained uninjured. The assassin was never found and leads hinting towards involvement of the Red Army Faction proved inconclusive. As the German magazine Der Spiegel wrote a year later, some party colleagues allegedly considered it possible that Kiep had staged the attack himself.

== Personal life ==
From 1950, Kiep was married to Charlotte Kiep, born 1920, daughter of IG Farben board member and convicted war criminal Fritz ter Meer. They met when Kiep was only thirteen years old. He needed to visit Fritz ter Meer in Landsberg Prison to ask for his daughter's hand in marriage. They had four children together, sons Walther, Michael and daughters Charlotte and Christiane. Their second son, Michael Jürgen, died in 1975, aged 24. The parents started a foundation for young journalists in his name. From a previous marriage of his wife's, Kiep was stepfather to another son, Edmund.

== Death ==
Kiep died on 9 May 2016, surrounded by his family in his home in Kronberg im Taunus in Hesse, at the age of 90.

== Awards and memberships ==
=== Awards ===
- 1977: Cravat man of the year
- 1994: Order of Merit of the Federal Republic of Germany
- 1998: Lower Saxony Order of Merit

=== Memberships ===
From 1984 to 2000, Kiep was chairman of the Atlantik-Brücke. From 1994 to 2000 he served as president of the EBS University of Business and Law. He was a member of the International Advisory Boards of Fuji Bank and Columbia University, as well as a member of the board of Volkswagen and Deutsche Bank.

== Bibliography ==
- Kiep, Walther Leisler (1999). Was bleibt ist große Zuversicht. Erfahrungen eines Unabhängigen. Ein politisches Tagebuch (in German). Berlin/Vienna: Philo. ISBN 3-8257-0140-9.
- Kiep, Walther Leisler (2006). Brücken meines Lebens. Die Erinnerungen (in German). Munich: Herbig. ISBN 3-7766-2444-2.
