= Ernst Breidenbach =

German politician (1912–1988)

Ernst Gustav Maximilian Breidenbach (April 11, 1912 in Frankfurt am Main – October 9, 1988 in Hamburg) was a German politician. He was a member of the CDU (Christian Democratic Union) and the Hamburg Bloc. He served as the Senator for Youth and Social Affairs in the Sieveking Senate from 1953 to 1957.

== Early life ==
After graduating from high school, Breidenbach, who was involved in the evangelical youth movement, completed a commercial apprenticeship. Since 1934, he worked as a professional soldier. He was captured as a prisoner of war, and upon release, he assumed leading positions in the Young Men's Christian Association in Hamburg. From 1949 to 1953, he was a member of the board of the German Youth Hostel Association.

Breidenbach got married in 1940 and had three children from the marriage.

== Political career ==
In the 1953 Hamburg state election, Breidenbach successfully ran for the direct mandate, thereby entering the Hamburg Parliament (Hamburgische Bürgerschaft). Following the Hamburg Block's achievement of an absolute majority in the Parliament, formed by the CDU, FDP, DP, and BHE, Kurt Sieveking was elected as the first mayor (Erster Bürgermeister). He appointed Breidenbach to his Senate, where he was responsible for the Youth and parts of the Social Authority.

After being on sick leave for an extended period and spending a three-month cure in Italy, Breidenbach resigned from the Senate position effective July 1, 1957. He had already relinquished his mandate in the Parliament on April 9, 1957. According to his own statement, his resignation occurred 'due to irreconcilable differences with the Senate majority.' A report in the Hamburger Abendblatt in 2002 attributed his resignation to drug problems or medication misuse. His resignation from this office also led to his departure from the CDU's state executive committee, although he remained a party member. Prior to this, the SPD had already criticized his frequent absence and urged Breidenbach to resign.

Emilie Kiep-Altenloh was appointed as Breidenbach's successor at the helm of the Youth Authority. Previously, she had jointly led the Social Authority with Breidenbach and had acted as interim head of the Youth Authority during his sick leave.

Due to his premature resignation, Breidenbach initially did not qualify for a senatorial pension, which is normally granted after a tenure of four years – Breidenbach had served for three years and seven months. After being declared occupationally disabled, he applied in 1973 for a pension based on a hardship provision. After much debate, he was granted a pension amounting to 26 percent of the salary from his time in office, with a simultaneous offset against further pension entitlements. However, a request to increase the pension, submitted by Breidenbach shortly before his death, was rejected.

== Honors ==
For his services to Protestant youth work, Breidenbach was awarded the Golden World Alliance Needle of the YMCA in 1954.
