= Limburg Basin =

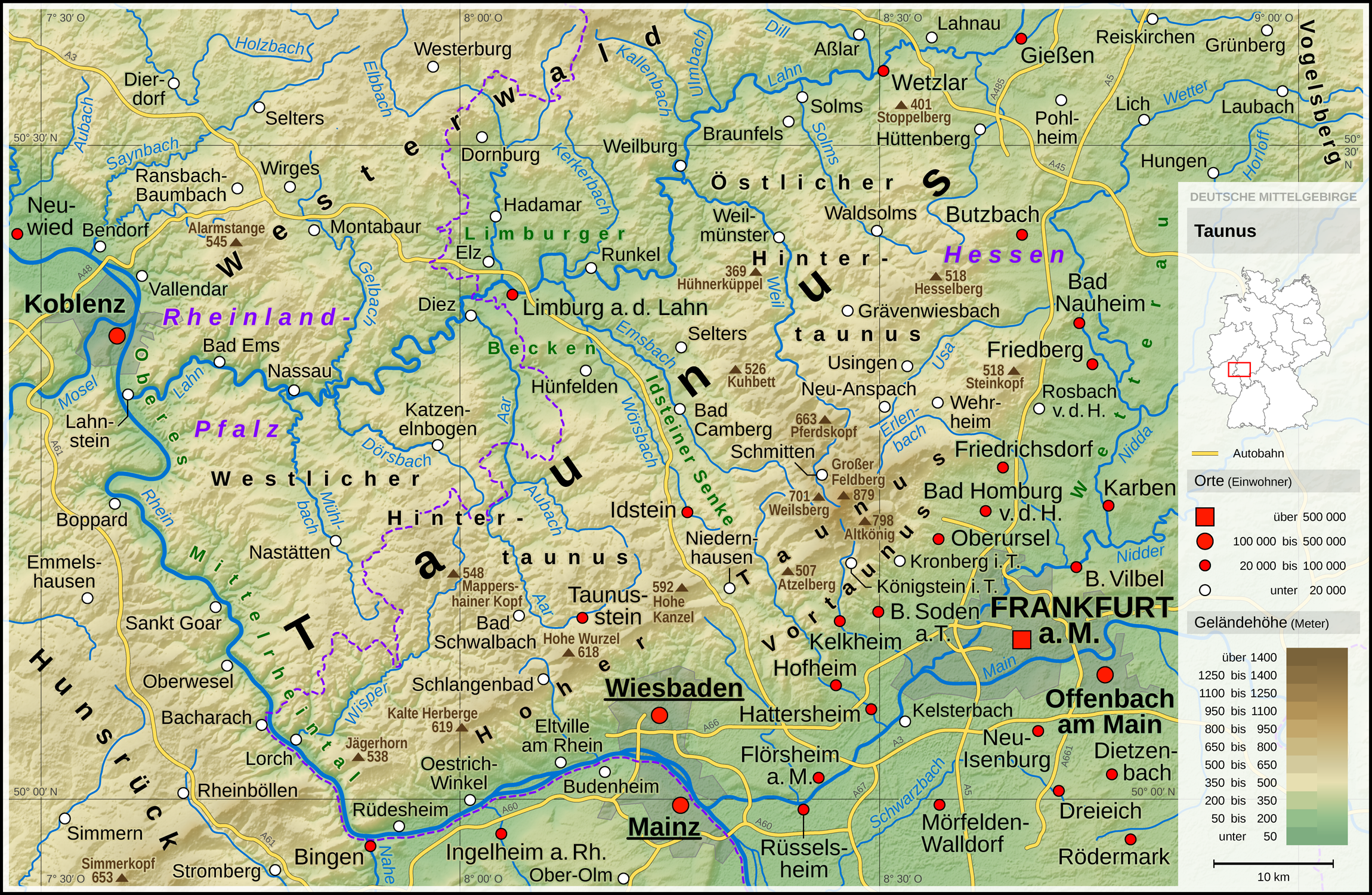
The Limburg Basin between the Taunus and Westerwald

The Limburg Basin (German: Limburger Becken) is one of the two large intramontane lowland areas within the Rhenish Massif in Germany, the other being the Middle Rhine Basin. It forms the central part of the natural region of the Gießen-Koblenz Lahn Valley between the Weilburg Lahn Valley Region and the Lower Lahn Valley on both sides of the Lahn around the town of Limburg.

== Description ==
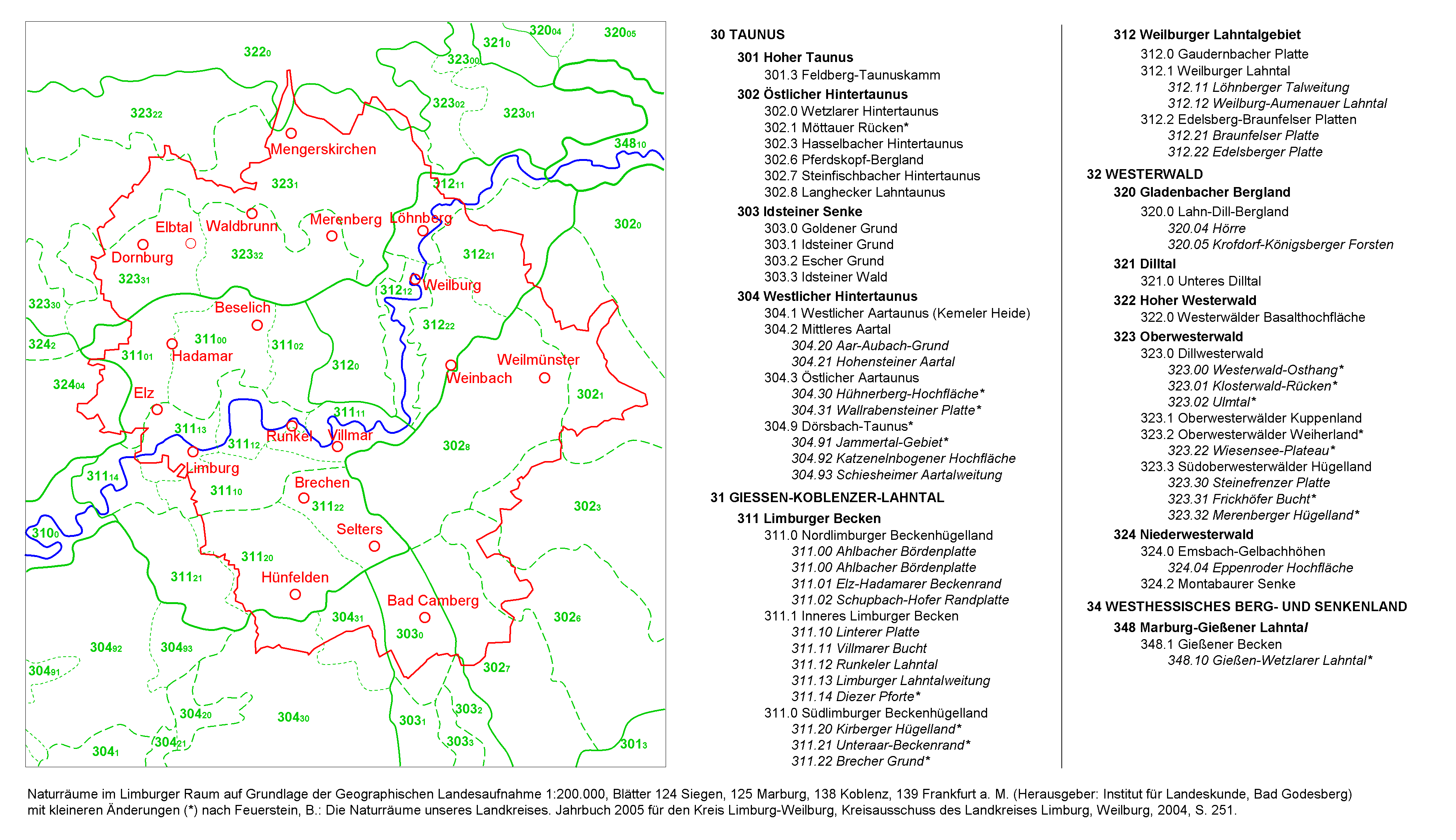
Natural regions in the Limburg region (county of Limburg-Weilburg)

The Limburg basin, which measures about 20 by 14 kilometres across and is almost treeless, is a tectonic intrusion field (Einbruchsfeld) and connects the more deeply incised valley sections in the Weilburg Lahn Valley area with those of the Lower Lahn Valley. It is divided into the North and South Limburg Basin Hills and the almost level Inner Limburg Basin, including the Villmar Bay and Linter Plateau, in whose bottom the winding course of the course of the Lahn has sunk about 50 metres deep. The hills that rise at the edges of the basin or within it form landmarks that are visible from a long distance away, dominating the landscape. These include the Heidenhäuschen (397.9 m above sea level (NHN)) north of Steinbach, the Mensfelder Kopf (313.7 m) and the hill ridge of Galgenberg (up to 277.1 m) on the far side of the eastern rim of the basin in the Langhecken Lahn Taunus (in the Eastern Hintertaunus) near Villmar.

The bedrock consists mainly of rocks from the geological Lahn Depression, which outcrop at the edges and on the steep slopes of the valleys. Of particular importance here are three beds of Middle Devonian Corallian Limestone (Lahn Marble) which are embedded in the predominantly volcanic rocks (diabase, schalstein) of the Lahn Depression. In the north, the terrain is shaped by the younger volcanism of the Westerwald with individual basalt deposits - the Galgenberg (241.8 m) at Hadamar, the Großer Berg (245.3 m}) at Ahlbach, the Beselicher Kopf (296 m}) at Obertiefenbach. These are related to tectonic distortions, which pass through the basin in a north–south direction and are recognizable by the Weitungen at Dietkirchen and Limburg as well as by ditch fillings (sand, gravel, clay).

The Lahn leaves the basin at the Diezer Pforte and transitions, accompanied by a flight of terraces, into the Lower Lahn Valley near Fachingen. The mineral springs there rise from a tectonic fault line, which forms the western rim of the basin facing the Western Hintertaunus, the line is discernible from the thermal springs of Bad Schwalbach and Schlangenbad running up to the Rheingau.

Large areas of the Limburg Basin are covered by thick loess layers, for example, on the Ahlbacher Bördenplatte which is flanked by the Elz-Hadamar Basin Rim with the Elbbach bottom and the Schupbach-Hofen Perimeter Plateau with the valley of the lower Kerkerbach as its boundary. The black earth-like soils, together with the favourable climate of the basin, have resulted in an important old settlement area with intensive corn and root crop farming. In the southern part of the basin, the Kirberg Hills, the local name of "Golden County" (Goldene Grafschaft) on the Aar and the Goldener Grund along the Emsbach reflects the fertility of the area. Not to be underestimated is the historical importance of the basin for road communications as there is a key crossing over the Lahn at Limburg, used by long-distance trading routes of the early Middle Ages. The A3 motorway and Cologne–Rhine/Main high speed railway continue this tradition by following a very similar course.

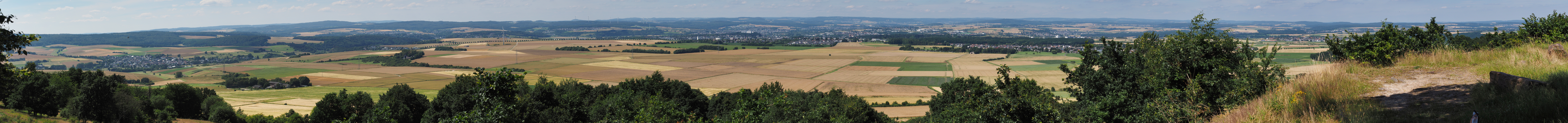
View from the Mensfelder Kopf of the Limburg Basin with Limburg in the centre

== Sources ==
- Bundesamt für Naturschutz (BfN):
  - Map service
  - Landscape fact file (entire major unit group)
- Environmental Atlas of Hess (Umweltatlas Hessen):
  - Map
  - Description (Haupteinheit 311)
- Literature:
  - Feuerstein, B.: Die Naturräume unseres Landkreises. Jahrbuch 2005 für den Kreis Limburg-Weilburg, Kreisausschuss des Landkreises Limburg-Weilburg, 2004, p. 251, ISBN 3-927006-41-6
