= Katja Adler =

German politician

- Born: 20 May 1974 (age 52); Eisenhüttenstadt, East Germany
- Occupation: Politician
- Political party: Free Democratic Party

Katja Adler (born 20 May 1974 in Eisenhüttenstadt) is a German politician from the Free Democratic Party (FDP) and civil servant. She was a member of the German Bundestag from 2021 to 2025.

== Early life ==
Adler was born in Eisenhüttenstadt, East Germany (now Brandenburg, Germany). Her parents are of German-Jewish origin. Adler attended Polytechnic Secondary School from 1980 to 1990. From 1982 to 1984, she attended the Frankfurt (Oder) sports school. From 1990, she was a pupil at Eisenhüttenstadt grammar school, where she graduated in 1992. She then studied at the University of Applied Sciences for Public Administration in Bernau, where she graduated in 1995 with a degree in public administration. In 1997, she began part-time studies at the University of Hagen, majoring in social behavioural sciences and minoring in political science and law, which she completed in 2006 with a Magister Artium.

== Political career ==
In 1995, she worked for the State Office for Food, Agriculture and Land Consolidation in Frankfurt an der Oder. From 1995 to 2002, Adler worked at the Ministry of Education of Mecklenburg-Vorpommern, specialising in science and research at universities. She was responsible for the University of Greifswald and Rostock University of Music and Theatre. In 2002, she moved to Rhineland-Palatinate and worked in the Ministry of Education, Science, Youth and Culture there until 2011, specialising in universities and science. From 2009 to 2011, she was assigned to the Rhineland-Palatinate Foundation for Innovation. From 2011 to 2021, she worked at the Rhineland-Palatinate Ministry for Family Affairs, Women, Culture and Integration, where she worked in the Children and Youth Department from 2011 to 2017 and in the Consumer Protection Department from 2017 to 2021.

At the 2021 German federal election, Adler unsuccessfully contested Hochtaunus, but was elected to the Bundestag on the state list. She received 11.3% of the first votes in her constituency and only came fourth with this result. In parliament, she has since been serving on the Committee on Family Affairs, Senior Citizens, Women and Youth. She is also secretary and a deputy member of the Committee on Education, Research and Technology Assessment and the Committee on Health.

== Political activities ==
Adler joined the FDP in 2010 and has been Chairwoman of the FDP Oberursel since 2011. She has been a member of the FDP parliamentary group in the Oberursel town council since 2014, where she was Chair of the Social, Education and Culture Committee and Chair of her parliamentary group from 2016 to 2021. From 2021 to the end of 2022, she was deputy chair of her parliamentary group. Since 6 December 2022, Katja Adler has been the sole representative of the FDP in the Oberursel town parliament - without parliamentary group status. Due to disagreements within the parliamentary group, which manifested themselves in the course of the budget debate, all three other group members left the FDP and are now represented in the city parliament as a group in the newly founded ULO (Unabhängige Liste Oberursel).

Katja Adler has been a member of the Hochtaunus district council since 2016, where she is a member of the committee for schools, culture, sport and leisure. She has been deputy chairwoman of the committee and deputy leader of the FDP parliamentary group since 2021.

From 2017 to 2019, she was a member of the state executive committee of the FDP Hessen in the role of assessor. Since 2020, she has been a member of the FDP Hochtaunuskreis district executive committee as an assessor.

== Political positions ==
In September 2022, she was one of seven members of the FDP parliamentary group in the Bundestag to vote against a new version of the Infection Protection Act of the traffic light coalition. In February 2024, she was the only member of the FDP parliamentary group to vote against the Cannabis Act.

== Private life ==
Adler is the mother of two children (* 2003; * 2008) and has lived in Oberursel since 2002.

She is in a relationship with the former Hessian Minister of Economics Florian Rentsch.
