= Markus Koob =

German politician (born 1977)

Markus Koob MdB
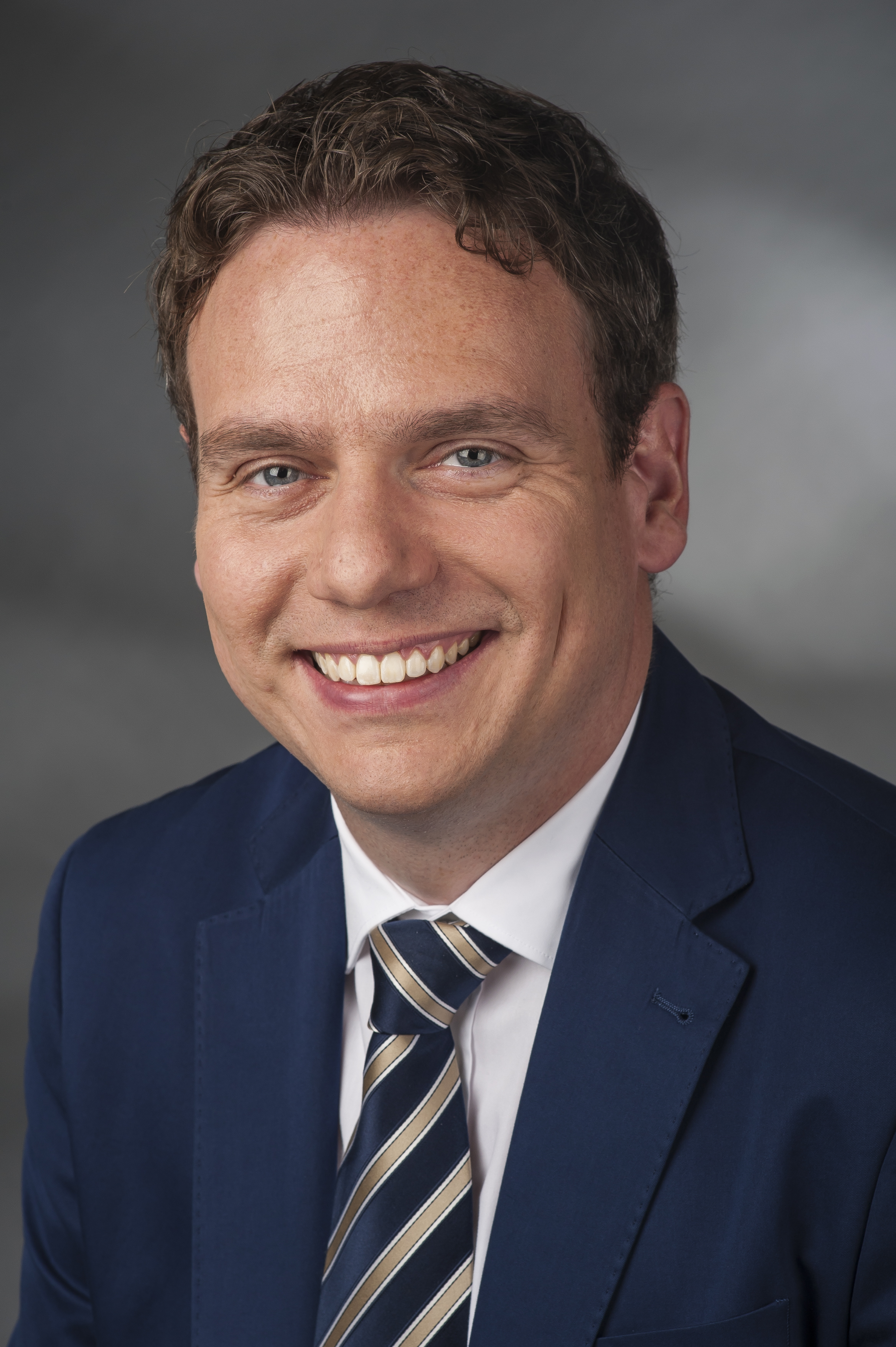
- Koob in 2014

Member of the Bundestag; for Hochtaunus
- Incumbent
- Assumed office 22 October 2013
- Preceded by: Helmut Heiderich

Personal details
- Born: Markus Benjamin Koob; 5 December 1977 (age 48) Kronberg im Taunus, West Germany
- Party: Christian Democratic Union
- Education: University of Mainz

Markus Koob (born 5 December 1977) is a German politician of the Christian Democratic Union (CDU) who has been serving as a member of the Bundestag from the state of Hesse since 2013.

== Political career ==
Koob first became a member of the Bundestag in the 2013 German federal election. In parliament, served on the Finance Committee and the Committee on Family Affairs, Senior Citizens, Women and Youth until moving to the Committee on Foreign Affairs in 2018. He is parliamentary group's rapporteur on relations to India, Central Africa and West Africa.

In addition to his committee assignments, Koob is part of the German Parliamentary Friendship Group with Romania, Bulgaria and Moldova.
