= Bettina Stark-Watzinger =

German politician (born 1968)

Bettina Stark-Watzinger MdB
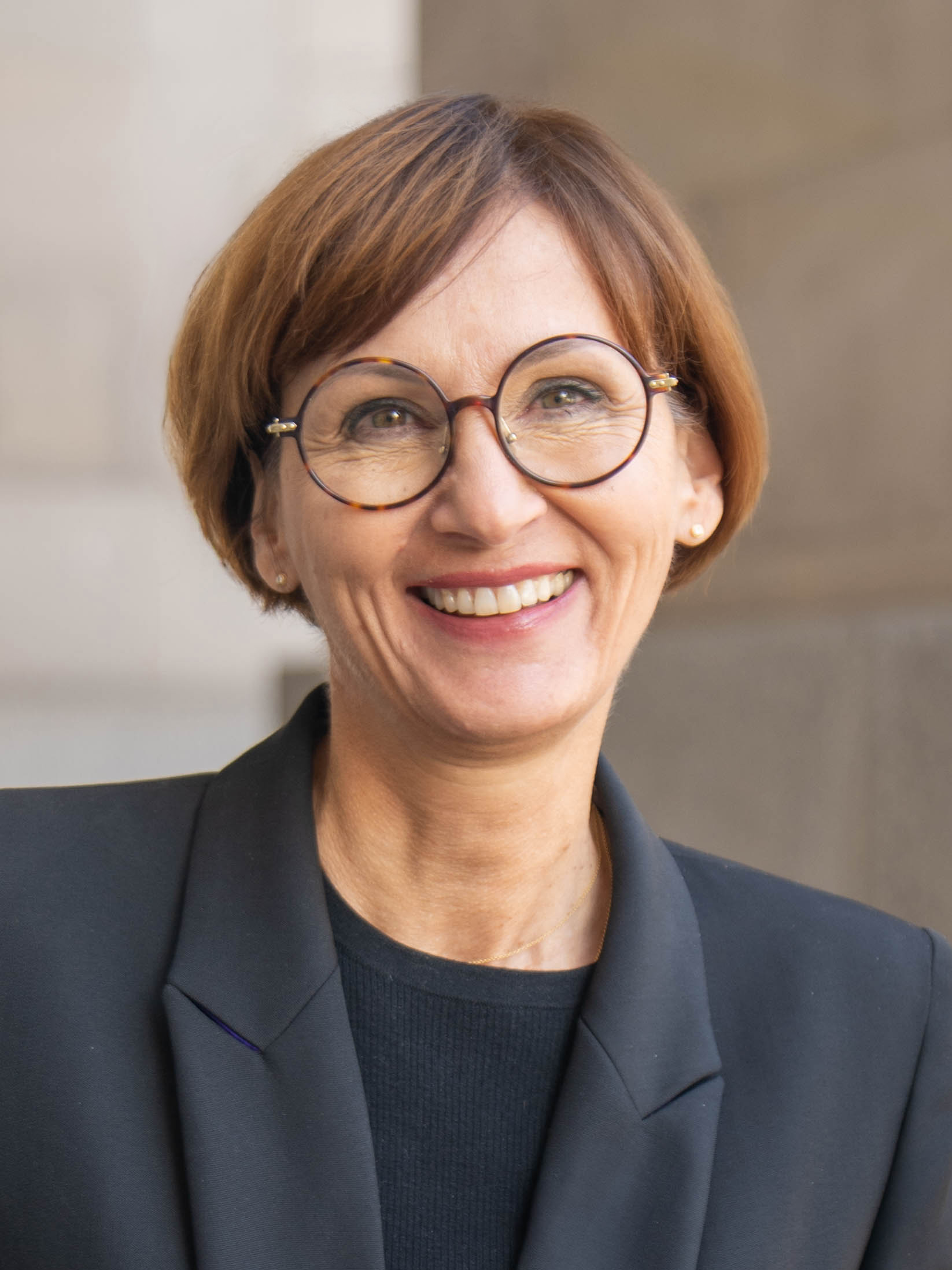
- Stark-Watzinger in 2023

Deputy Leader of the Free Democratic Party
- Incumbent
- Assumed office 22 April 2023 Serving with Wolfgang Kubicki and Johannes Vogel
- Leader: Christian Lindner
- Preceded by: Nicola Beer

Minister of Education and Research
- In office 8 December 2021 – 7 November 2024
- Chancellor: Olaf Scholz
- Preceded by: Anja Karliczek
- Succeeded by: Cem Özdemir

Chairwoman of the Free Democratic Party in Hesse
- Incumbent
- Assumed office 27 March 2021
- Deputy: Wiebke Knell; Thorsten Lieb
- Preceded by: Stefan Ruppert

Member of the German Bundestag from Hesse
- In office 24 October 2017 – 2025

Personal details
- Born: 12 May 1968 (age 58) Frankfurt, West Germany (now Germany)
- Party: Free Democratic Party
- Children: 2
- Education: University of Mainz; Goethe University Frankfurt
- Occupation: Economist; politician; academic; legislator

Bettina Stark-Watzinger (German pronunciation: [bɛˈtiːna ˈʃtaʁk ˈvat͜sɪŋɐ]; née Stark, born 12 May 1968) is a German economist and politician of the Free Democratic Party (FDP) who served as Minister of Education and Research in Chancellor Olaf Scholz's cabinet from 2021 to 2024. She was a member of the Bundestag from the state of Hesse from 2017 to 2025.

Since 2021, Stark-Watzinger has been the chairwoman of the FDP in Hesse. Since 2023, she has been one of the three deputies of Christian Lindner in his capacity as FDP chairman.

== Early life and career ==
Stark-Watzinger graduated from high school in 1989 and subsequently studied economics at the University of Mainz and the Goethe University Frankfurt from 1989 to 1993. She graduated with a degree in economics.

From 1994 to 1996, Stark-Watzinger completed a trainee programme at BHF Bank in Frankfurt, where she worked as Regional Manager. This was followed by a six-year stay abroad in the United Kingdom from the end of 1996 to 2001, where she initially worked in the financial sector again in London, and a family break. From 2006 to 2008 she worked in the Academic Manager, Finance, Accounting, Controlling and Taxation Department at the European Business School in Oestrich-Winkel. From 2008 until her election to the Bundestag in 2017, Stark-Watzinger worked as managing director in the commercial department of an interdisciplinary research institution, the Leibniz Institute for Financial Research (SAFE) at Goethe University Frankfurt.

== Political career ==
=== Early beginnings ===
While in secondary school, Stark-Watzinger initially joined the Young Union (JU), the joint youth organisation of the two conservative German political parties, CDU and CSU. She later became a member of the FDP in 2004.

In 2011, Stark-Watzinger was elected to the FDP leadership in Hesse, under successive chairpersons Jörg-Uwe Hahn (2011–2014) and Stefan Ruppert (2014–2021). Ruppert appointed her to the position of secretary general in 2015.

=== Member of the German Parliament, 2017–2025 ===
Stark-Watzinger first became a member of the Bundestag in the 2017 German federal election, representing the Main-Taunus district.

From 2017 until 2020, Stark-Watzinger chaired the Finance Committee. In this capacity, she also served as her parliamentary group's rapporteur on plans for a financial transaction tax.

At the end of January 2020, Stark-Watzinger was elected parliamentary manager of the FDP parliamentary group in the Bundestag. In this capacity, she was a member of the parliament's Council of Elders, which – among other duties – determines daily legislative agenda items and assigns committee chairpersons based on party representation. She also joined the Budget Committee, where she served as her parliamentary group's rapporteur on the annual budget of the Federal Ministry of Education and Research. She was a member of the so-called Confidential Committee (Vertrauensgremium) of the Budget Committee, which provides budgetary supervision for Germany's three intelligence services, BND, BfV and MAD.

In addition to her committee assignments, Stark-Watzinger has been part of the German Parliamentary Friendship Group for Relations with the States of South Asia since 2018. Since 2019, she has been a member of the German delegation to the Franco-German Parliamentary Assembly.

In 2021, Stark-Watzinger was elected chairwoman of the FDP in Hesse, succeeding Stefan Ruppert.

In the negotiations to form a so-called traffic light coalition of the Social Democratic Party (SPD), the Green Party and the FDP following the 2021 German elections, Stark-Watzinger was part of her party's delegation in the leadership group, alongside Christian Lindner, Volker Wissing and Marco Buschmann.

=== Federal Minister of Education and Research, 2021–2024 ===
Following the 2021 federal election, the FDP entered a traffic light coalition government, and Stark-Watzinger took office as Minister of Education and Research in the Scholz cabinet on 8 December 2021. In her capacity as minister, Stark-Watzinger was a member of the Joint Science Conference (GWK), a body which deals with all questions of research funding, science and research policy strategies and the science system that jointly affect Germany's federal government and its 16 federal states.

In March 2023, Stark-Watzinger became the first German minister to visit Taiwan in 26 years, leading the Chinese Foreign Ministry to file a strong protest with Germany about her "vile conduct".

At the FDP's national convention in April 2023, Stark-Watzinger was elected by delegates as one of three deputies of chairman Christian Lindner, succeeding Nicola Beer.

=== Controversy about funding probe ===
In June 2024, the German public news station NDR revealed that under Stark-Watzinger's leadership, the Ministry of Education and Research requested investigations into whether the ministry could strip funding from signatories of an open letter criticizing the management of Freie Universität Berlin of its behaviour concerning students who had participated in a pro-Palestinian protest camp. The signatories did not comment on the situation in Israel, but pointed out the right to peaceful protest, freedom of assembly and freedom of expression.

Stark-Watzinger's ministry wanted to initiate an investigation into whether those who signed the letter could be prosecuted and whether their funding could be withdrawn. Ministerial secretary Sabine Döring, who was executing this policy, later said that she had "obviously expressed herself in a misleading way". When this fact became public, more than 2,000 university teachers called for Stark-Watzinger to resign. Daniel Bax from Die Tageszeitung described Stark-Watzingers behaviour as an abuse of power by the minister. In a statement of the ministry from 16 June 2024, Stark-Watzinger asked Chancellor Olaf Scholz to assign Döring to temporary retirement. In July 2024, Döring filed a lawsuit with the Berlin district court against the ministry to ensure that she was allowed to publicly comment on the affair.

== Life after politics ==
In 2026, Stark-Watzinger joined U.S.-German startup Focused Energy as Senior Strategic Advisor on Global Energy & Innovation Policy.

== Other activities ==
- Deutsche Telekom Foundation, Member of the Board of Trustees
- Volkswagen Foundation, Ex-Officio Member of the Board of Trustees (2022–2024)
- Leibniz Association, Ex-Officio Member of the Senate (2022–2024)
- Helmholtz Association of German Research Centres, Ex-Officio Member of the Senate (2022–2024)
- German Academy of Science and Engineering (acatech), Ex-Officio Member of the Senate (2022–2024)
- German National Association for Student Affairs, Ex-Officio Member of the Board of Trustees (2022–2024)
- Bildung & Begabung, Ex-Officio Chair of the Board of Trustees (2022–2024)
- Jugend forscht, Ex-Officio Chair of the Board of Trustees (2022–2024)
- Deutsches Museum, Member of the Board of Trustees (since 2022)
- Alexander von Humboldt Foundation, Ex-Officio Member of the Board of Trustees (2021–2024)
- Ernst Reuter Foundation for Advanced Study, Ex-Officio Vice-chair of the Board of Trustees (2021–2024)
- German Future Prize, Ex-Officio Member of the Board of Trustees (2021–2024)
- Villa Vigoni – German-Italian Centre for the European Dialogue, Ex-Officio Member of the Board of Trustees (2021–2024)
- Total E-Quality initiative, Member of the Board of Trustees
- Friedrich Naumann Foundation, Member of the Board (since 2018)
- Karl-Hermann Flach Foundation, Member of the Advisory Board
- Leibniz Institute for Financial Research (SAFE), Member of the Policy Council

== Personal life ==
Stark-Watzinger is married to real estate investor Hermann Watzinger and has two daughters.
