= Stefan Ruppert =

German politician

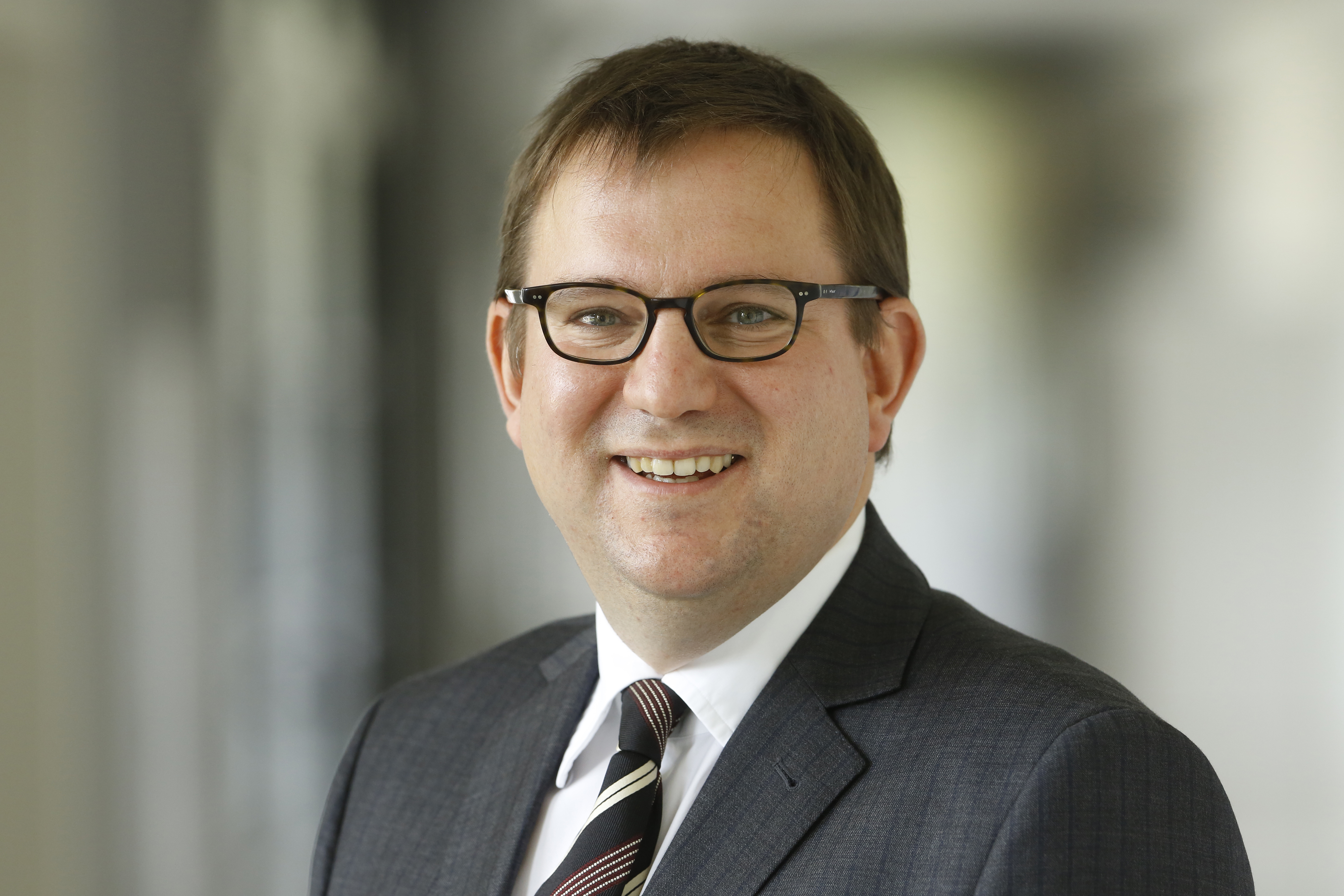
- Ruppert in 2015

Chairman of the Free Democratic Party in Hesse
- In office 2014–2021
- Deputy: Lasse Becker; Bettina Stark-Watzinger
- Preceded by: Jörg-Uwe Hahn
- Succeeded by: Bettina Stark-Watzinger

Member of the Bundestag
- Incumbent
- Assumed office 2017

Personal details
- Born: 2 July 1971 (age 55) Frankfurt, West Germany (now Germany)
- Party: FDP
- Education: Goethe University Frankfurt

Stefan Ruppert (born 2 July 1971 in Frankfurt) is a German lawyer and former politician of the Free Democratic Party (FDP) who served as a member of the Bundestag from the state of Hesse from 2009 until 2013 and from 2017 until 2020. He chaired the FDP in Hesse from 2014 to 2021.

== Early life and career ==
After graduating from the bilingual (German/French) branch of the draughtsmanship school in Frankfurt am Main in 1991, Ruppert did community service with the German Red Cross (DRK) in the field of geriatric care.

From 1992 onward, Ruppert studied law, political science, and history at Goethe University Frankfurt and took his first state examination in 1997. In 2001, he received his doctorate with his dissertation on Canon Law and the Kulturkampf and was awarded the Otto Hahn Medal. In 2003, he completed the second state examination in law after a two years of academic work at the Federal Constitutional Court.

== Political career ==
Ruppert joined the FDP in 1990. In the 2009 federal elections, he entered the German Bundestag via the Hesse state list. He was a member of the Committee on Internal Affairs and his parliamentary group’s spokesperson on churches and religious communities. Due to the FDP's failure to reach the five percent hurdle in the 2013 federal elections, he left the Bundestag.

Ruppert became a member of the Bundestag again in the 2017 German federal election. There he was parliamentary manager of the FDP parliamentary group until January 2020.

From 2018 until 2020, Ruppert was part of a cross-party working group on a reform of Germany’s electoral system, chaired by Wolfgang Schäuble.

== Life after politics ==
In 2020, Ruppert joined the board of B. Braun.

== Other activities ==
- Friedrich Naumann Foundation, Member of the Board of Trustees (since 2021)
- Hermann Kunst Foundation for the Promotion of New Testament Textual Research, Member of the Board of Trustees
