= Emilie Kiep-Altenloh =

German sociologist and politician (1888–1985)

Member of the Bundestag; from Hamburg
- In office 17 October 1961 – 19 October 1965
- Constituency: State list

Personal details
- Born: Emilie Altenloh; 30 July 1888 Ennepetal, Germany
- Died: 22 February 1985 (aged 96) Hamburg, West Germany
- Party: Free Democratic Party
- Other political affiliations: DDP (1929–1930)
- Spouse: Johann Nikolaus Kiep (m. 1923; died 1967)
- Relatives: Otto Kiep (brother-in-law); Walther Leisler Kiep (nephew)
- Education: Heidelberg University; LMU Munich; Kiel University; University of Vienna

Emilie Kiep-Altenloh (30 July 1888 – 22 February 1985) was a German sociologist and politician.

== Life ==
Kiep-Altenloh's doctorate, published as a book in 1914, was "the first scholarly publication on cinema in Germany".

Kiep-Altenloh was politically active in the German Democratic Party, advocating equality between men and women. The Nazis prohibited her involvement in politics, promoting a turn to biology and zoology in 1934. She joined Jakob Johann von Uexküll's Institut für Umweltforschung, later taking charge of the Institute and its work training guide dogs for the blind.

From 1961 to 1965 Kiep-Altenloh was a member of the Bundestag.

== Works ==
- Zur Soziologie des Kino: Die Kino-Unternehmung und die Sozialen Schichten Ihrer Besucher, 1914
- (with Ernst Kantorowicz) Leitfaden für Jugendämter und Jugendschöffen in der Jugendgerichtshilfe, 1923
