= Beselich =

- Municipality
- Flag Coat of arms

- Location of Beselich within Limburg-Weilburg district
- Interactive map of Beselich
- Location within Germany Location within Hesse
- Coordinates: 50°27′28″N 8°7′29″E
- Country: Germany
- State: Hesse
- Admin. region: Gießen
- District: Limburg-Weilburg

Government
  - Mayor (2019–25): Michael Franz (CDU)

Area
  - Total: 31.53 km^{2} (12.17 sq mi)
- Elevation: 190 m (620 ft)

Population (2025-12-31)
  - Total: 5,779
  - Density: 183.3/km^{2} (474.7/sq mi)
- Time zone: UTC+01:00 (CET)
  - Summer (DST): UTC+02:00 (CEST)
- Postal codes: 65614
- Dialling codes: 06484
- Vehicle registration: LM, WEL
- Website: www.beselich.de

Beselich is a municipality in Limburg-Weilburg district in Hesse, Germany.

== Geography ==
=== Location ===
Beselich lies on the northeast edge of the Limburg Basin on the edge of the Lahn valley, on the southeast slope of the Westerwald 220 m above sea level. Visible from far away is the Beselicher Kopf (296 m). The brooks Tiefenbach, Kerkerbach and Brandbach flow through the municipal area. Twenty-two percent of Beselich's area is wooded.

=== Geology ===
The countryside is partly wooded and underlain with marble, clay, basalt and iron ore deposits. To this day, clay is still quarried in Obertiefenbach. The black marble from the Schupbach area is used worldwide. Among other instances, it was used in the Empire State Building in New York City.

=== Neighbouring communities ===
The community of Beselich borders in the north on the communities of Merenberg and Waldbrunn, in the east on the town of Weilburg, in the south on the town of Runkel and the district seat of Limburg, also a town, and in the west on the town of Hadamar.

=== Constituent communities ===
Beselich's Ortsteile are Heckholzhausen, Niedertiefenbach, Obertiefenbach (community's administrative seat) and Schupbach.

== History ==
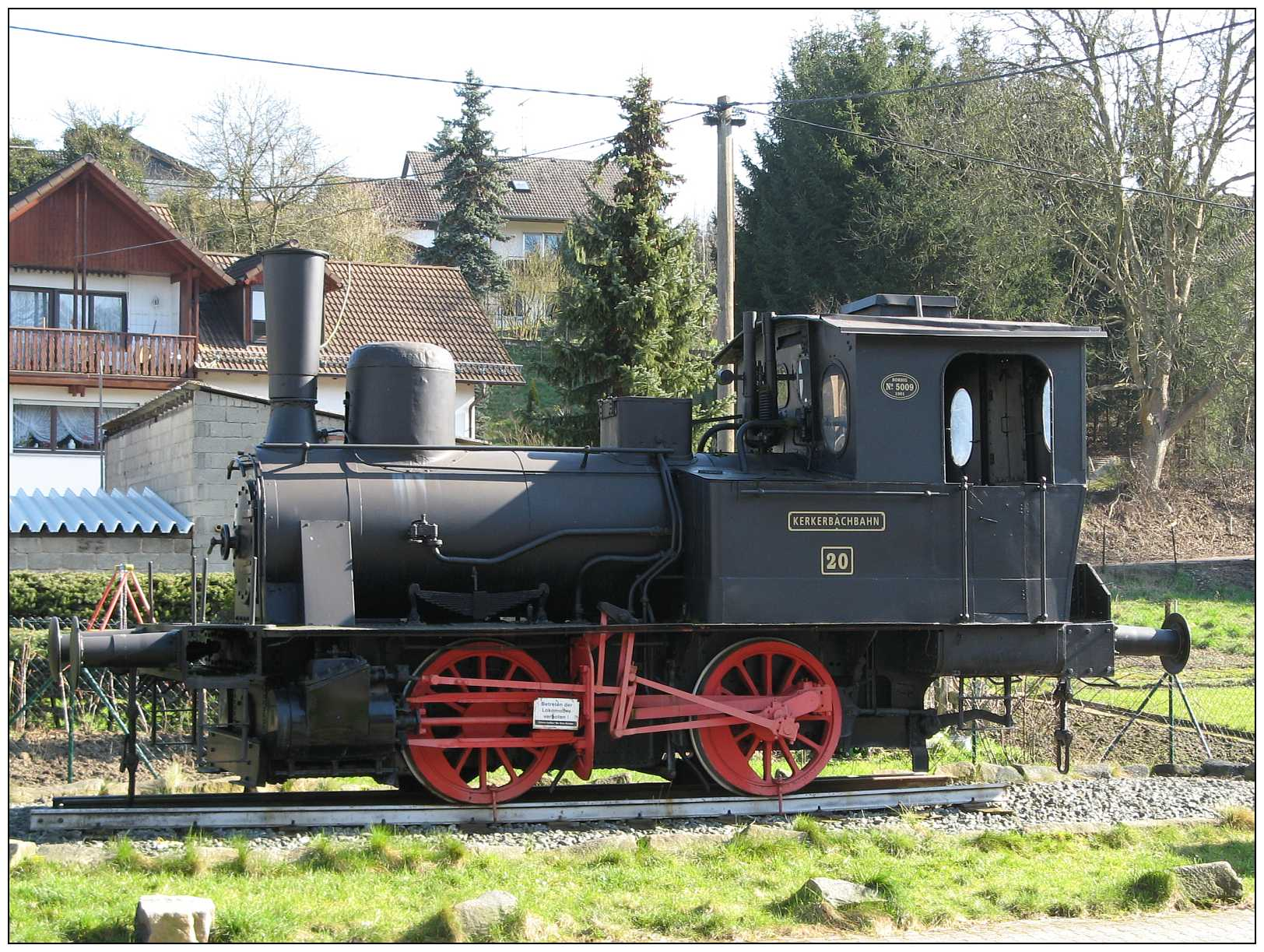
Locomotive used as a memorial to the former Kerkerbachbahn (railway), in Heckholzhausen

The community of Beselich came into being within the framework of administrative reform in Hesse on 30 December 1970 through the amalgamation of the formerly autonomous communities of Heckholzhausen, Niedertiefenbach, Obertiefenbach and Schupbach. It draws its name from the rural placename Beselicher Kopf (296 m) in the middle of the new collective municipality. The community's name is thus a back-formation created by presupposing on the basis of the word Beselicher that there must be some inhabited centre called “Beselich”. Upon the Beselicher Kopf once stood a Premonstratensian monastery, first mentioned in 1197. Between 1170 and 1230, the monastery's three-naved basilica was built, of which nowadays only a few wall remnants are left. In 1588, the monastery was reformed. The former monastery grounds, still used today for agriculture, passed into private ownership in 1656. Nearby, the Catholic pilgrimage chapel Maria Hilf was built in the late 18th century.

On 1 July 1974, Beselich was assigned to the new Limburg-Weilburg district through the merger of the two former districts of Oberlahnkreis and Limburg.

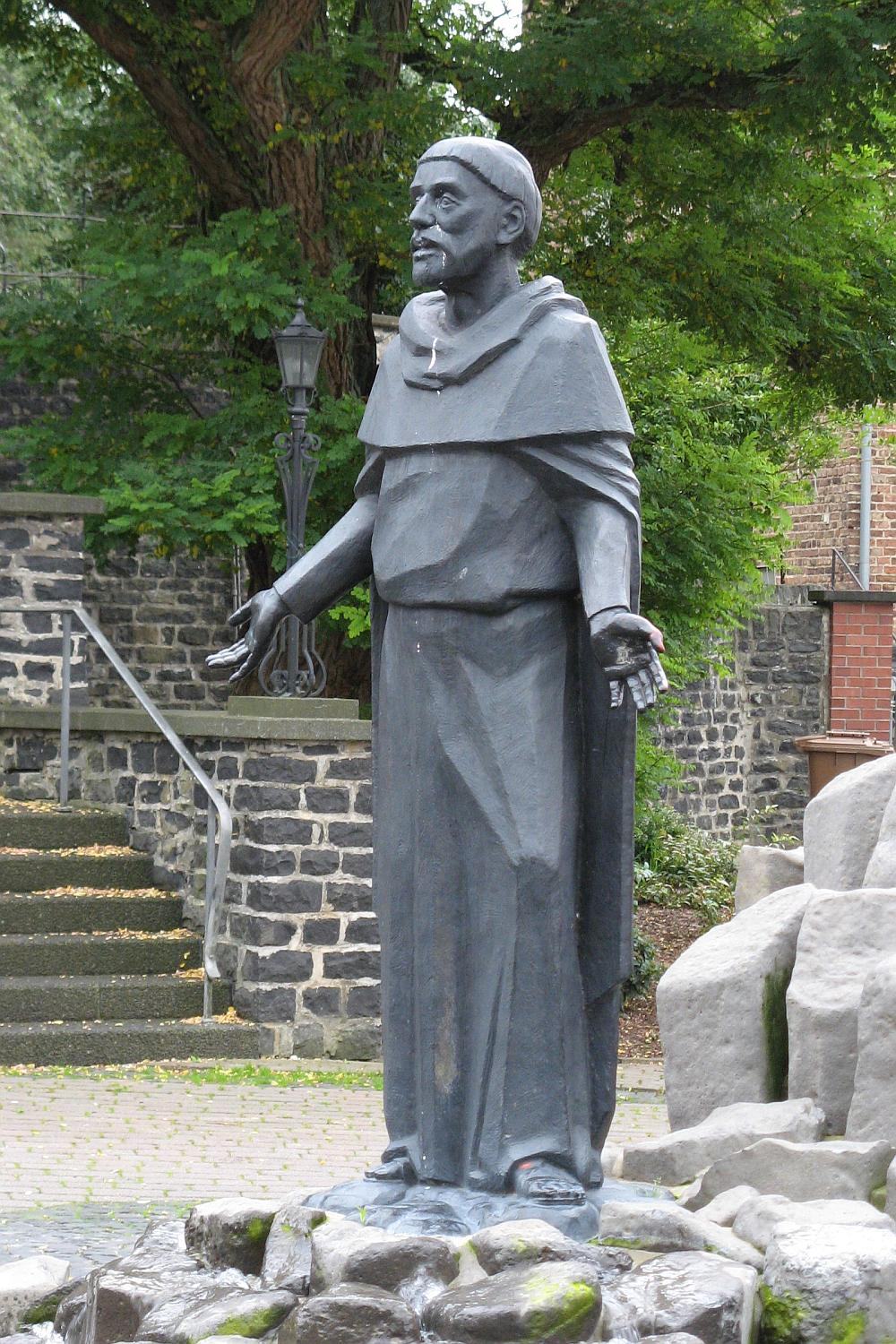
Memorial to Gottfried von Beselich before the church in Obertiefenbach

== Religion ==
In the community of Beselich there are two Catholic parishes, St. Ägidius Obertiefenbach and St. Marien Niedertiefenbach, as well as two Protestant ones in Schupbach and in Heckholzhausen. Beselich's Catholic pilgrimage chapel stands on the Beselicher Kopf, an elevation found in the middle of the community.

== Politics ==
=== Community council ===
The municipal election held on 26 March 2006 yielded the following results:

Parties and voter communities		% 2006	seats 2006	% 2001	seats 2001
CDU	Christian Democratic Union of Germany	44.0	11	47.3	12
SPD	Social Democratic Party of Germany	43.7	11	40.6	10
FDP / FWG	Free Democratic Party / Freie Wählergemeinschaft	12.2	3	12.1	3
Total		100.0	25	100.0	25
voter turnout in %		48.0		57.1	

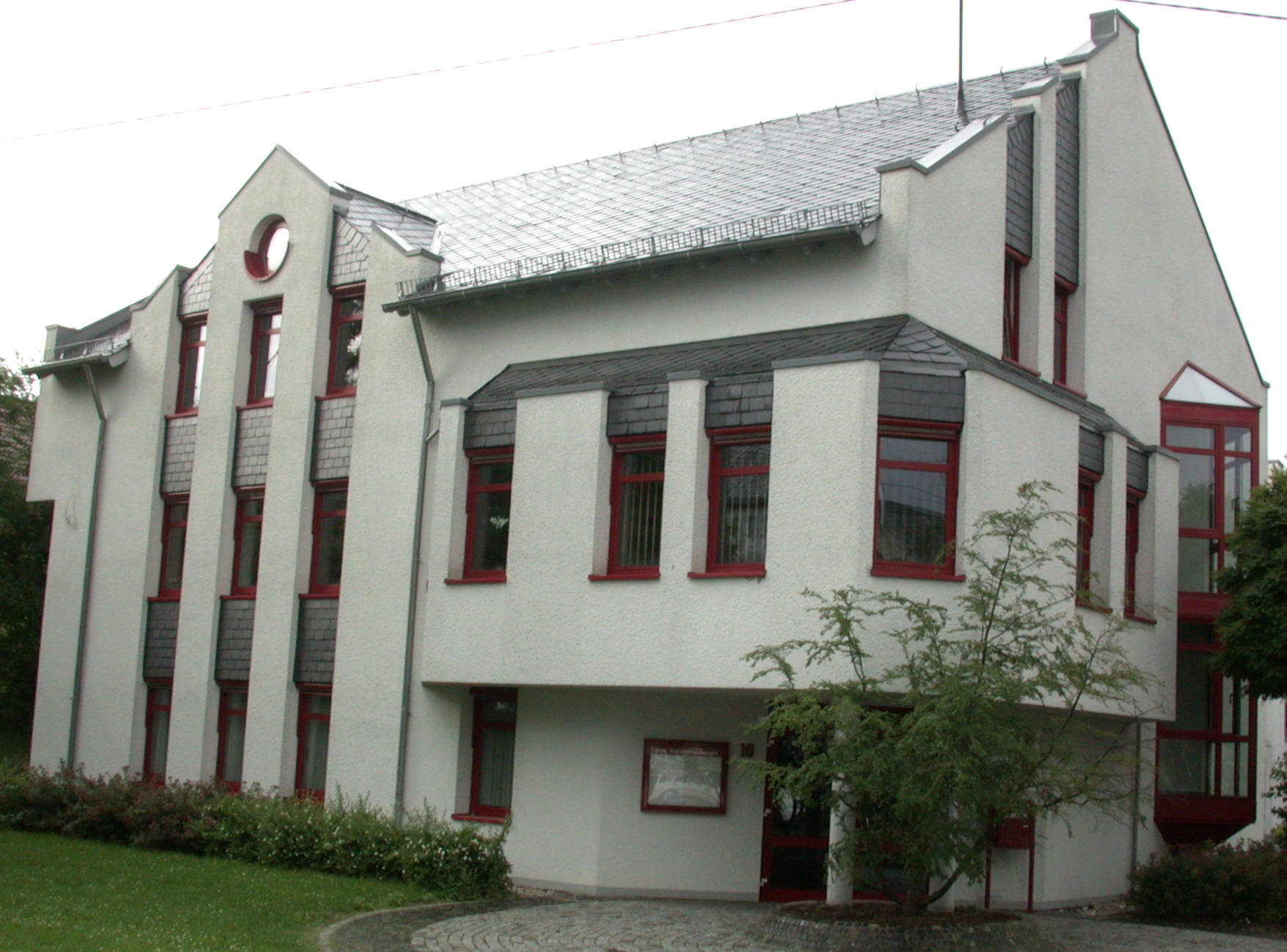
Beselich Town Hall in Obertiefenbach

=== Mayors ===
- 1971–1986: Alfred Roth
- 1986–1998: Hans-Peter Wahl
- 1998–2010: Martin Rudersdorf
- 2010–2014: Kai Müller
- 2014–2026: Michael Franz
- 2026-incumbent: Kai Speth

== Buildings ==
=== Beselich monastery ruins ===
On the Beselicher Kopf are found the restored ruins of the basilica of a former Premonstratensian monastery that was founded by Hillin of Falmagne, Archbishop of Trier in 1163 after Gottfried von Beselich had already built a little church together with a tithe-free estate there. For roughly 400 years, the monastery was the surrounding communities’ cultural and religious midpoint, until it fell down in the early 17th century. With a yearly fair on 15 July, first witnessed no later than 1545, the monastery also played an important economic rôle. The basilica ruins are also a starting point for scenic hiking paths.

=== Obertiefenbach ===
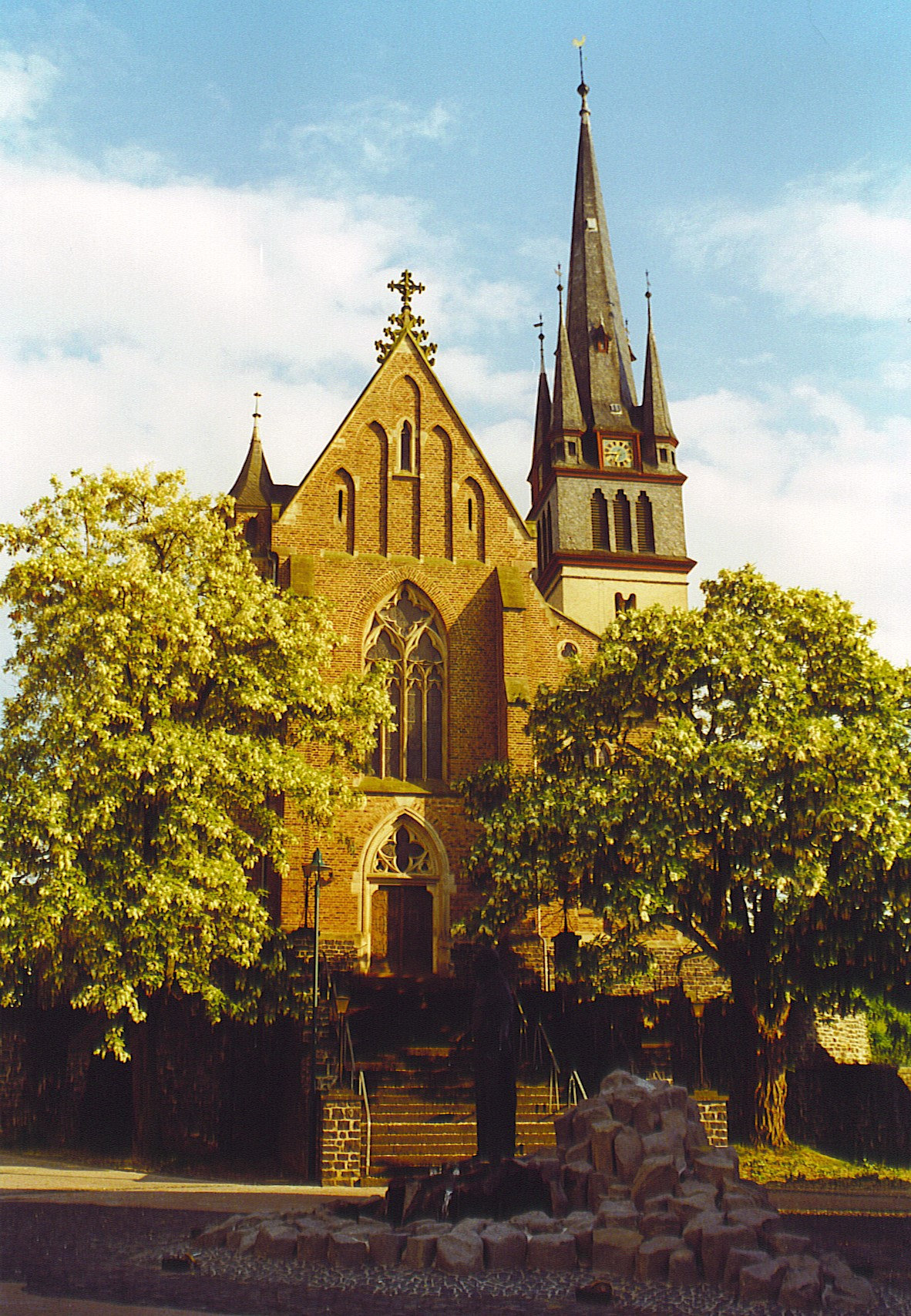
Catholic parish church St. Ägidus at Obertiefenbach

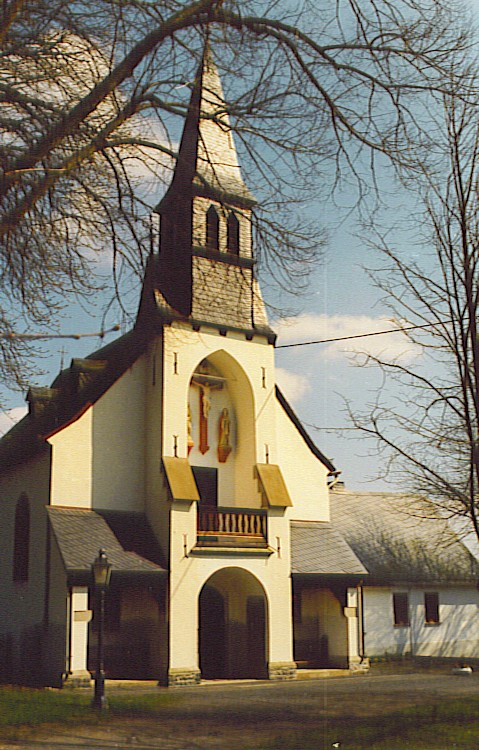
Catholic pilgrimage chapel Maria Hilf at Beselich

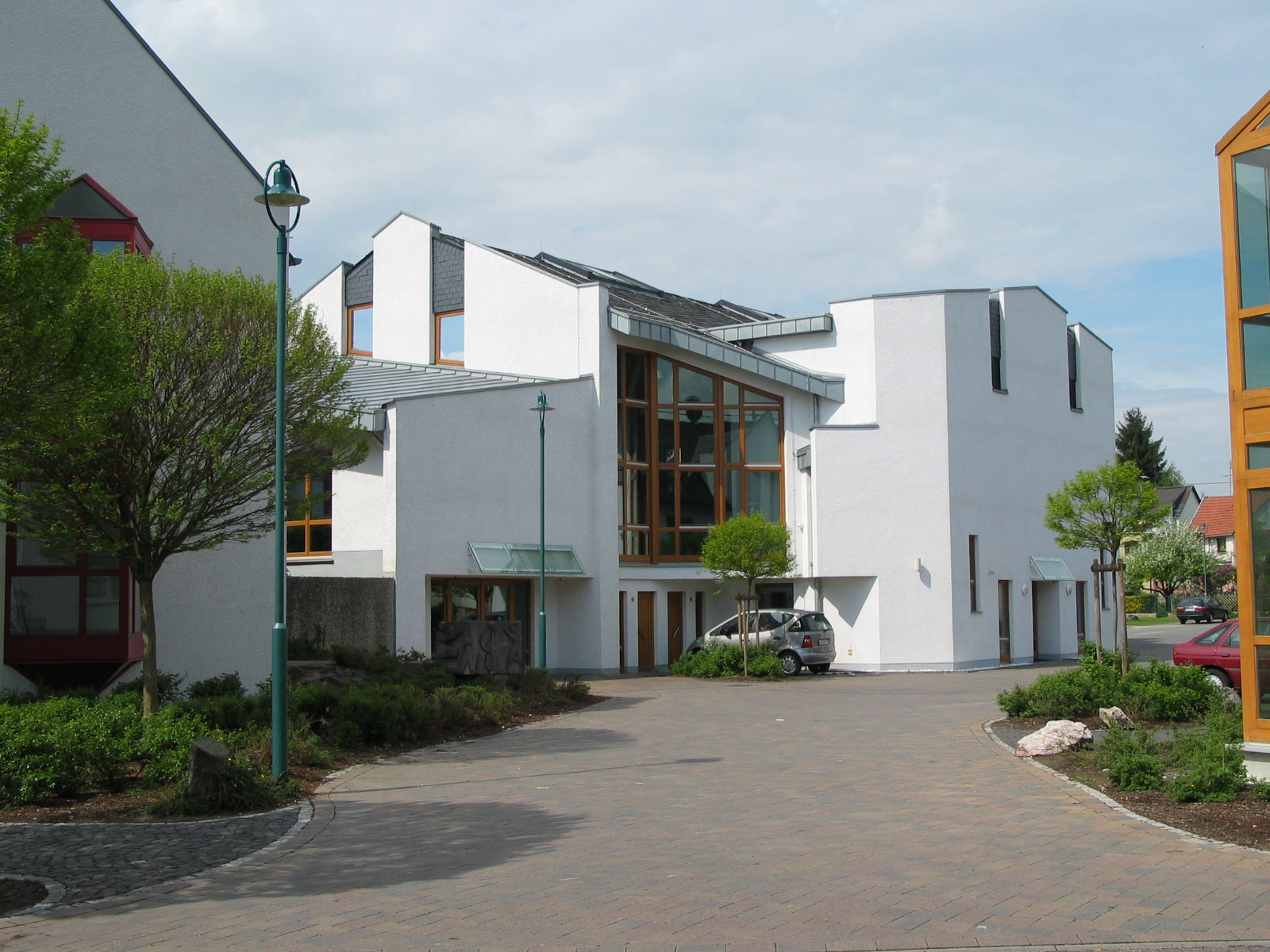
Bürgerhaus Obertiefenbach

==== Catholic parish church St. Ägidus ====
About 1200, the first stone church was built. The Baroque church built in 1733 on the Kirchberg was thoroughly converted in the years 1884 to 1886 and in 1888 consecrated. Of the old church only the 47-m-tall steeple was kept. The nave had been turned by 90°. The church is consecrated to Saint Giles and is used by the St. Ägidius Catholic parish.

==== Old school ====
The old school building was built in the middle of the community in 1872 and 1873 and was put into use on 15 October 1873. After the Beselich primary school on Schupbacher Straße came into use in 1983, the Catholic parish of Saint Giles (St. Ägidus) was able to take the building over from the community of Beselich and use it as a parish centre.

==== Pilgrimage chapel Maria Hilf ====
The Maria Hilf chapel stands on the Beselicher Kopf. This chapel honouring the Fourteen Holy Helpers owes its origin to the Franciscan hermit, Friar Leonhard's initiative. He was born in 1709 as Georg Niederstraßen, and after a life of extensive wanderings, he built a chapel and a hermitage here about 1760 on the former monastery's site with the local people's help. These were consecrated in 1767. In 2002, through donations and backing from the Bishopric of Limburg, the chapel had its interior refurbished and partly restored to its original condition. Today the chapel is daily sought out by many pilgrims and worshippers. From May to October, the Eucharist is celebrated every Friday evening at 18:00, and at 17:00 Sundays a Marian Prayer with a sermon and sacramental blessing is held. For praying, the chapel is open all year. On the way from Obertiefenbach to the pilgrimage chapel stand seven little chapels as reminders of Mary's seven sorrows.

==== Klopfsteinmühle ====
The Klopfsteinmühle was built to process basalt in the 19th century in the forest on the Beselicher Kopf. The operation was shut down before the Second World War.

==== Timber-frame houses ====
In the heart of Obertiefenbach are found in places timber-frame houses up to 400 years old, which are mostly under monumental protection as witnesses to the old building method. The oldest street names are likely Kellerweg and Milchkammer, which were supposedly in use by the late 13th century.

==== Community centre ====
The building now known as the Bürgerhaus Obertiefenbach (Obertiefenbach community centre) on Steinbacher Straße with connections to the community administration was built in 1964 as a multi-purpose hall. In 2000 and 2001, within the framework of the Obertiefenbach village renewal, this building was fully remodelled into a community centre.

==== Primary school ====
The Beselich primary school on Schupbacher Straße in Obertiefenbach was dedicated in 1983. The school serves all the community's children.

==== Sport hall ====
The sport hall standing right beside the primary school, whose ownership is shared by the community and the district of Limburg-Weilburg, came into service on 19 December 1990. All indoor sports can be played at the sport hall. It is at the primary school's disposal weekday mornings, while afternoons, evenings and weekends, the community's resident clubs may use it.

==== Maria Hilf seniors’ centre ====
In May 2000 on the floodplain in Obertiefenbach the Maria Hilf seniors’ centre, built by the community and run by the local Caritas chapter, officially came into service. The institution has at its disposal a welfare centre, and also 22 long-term and 10 short-term care places. At the beginning of 2006, the offerings were broadened through the addition of 11 flats designed for seniors.

=== Heckholzhausen ===
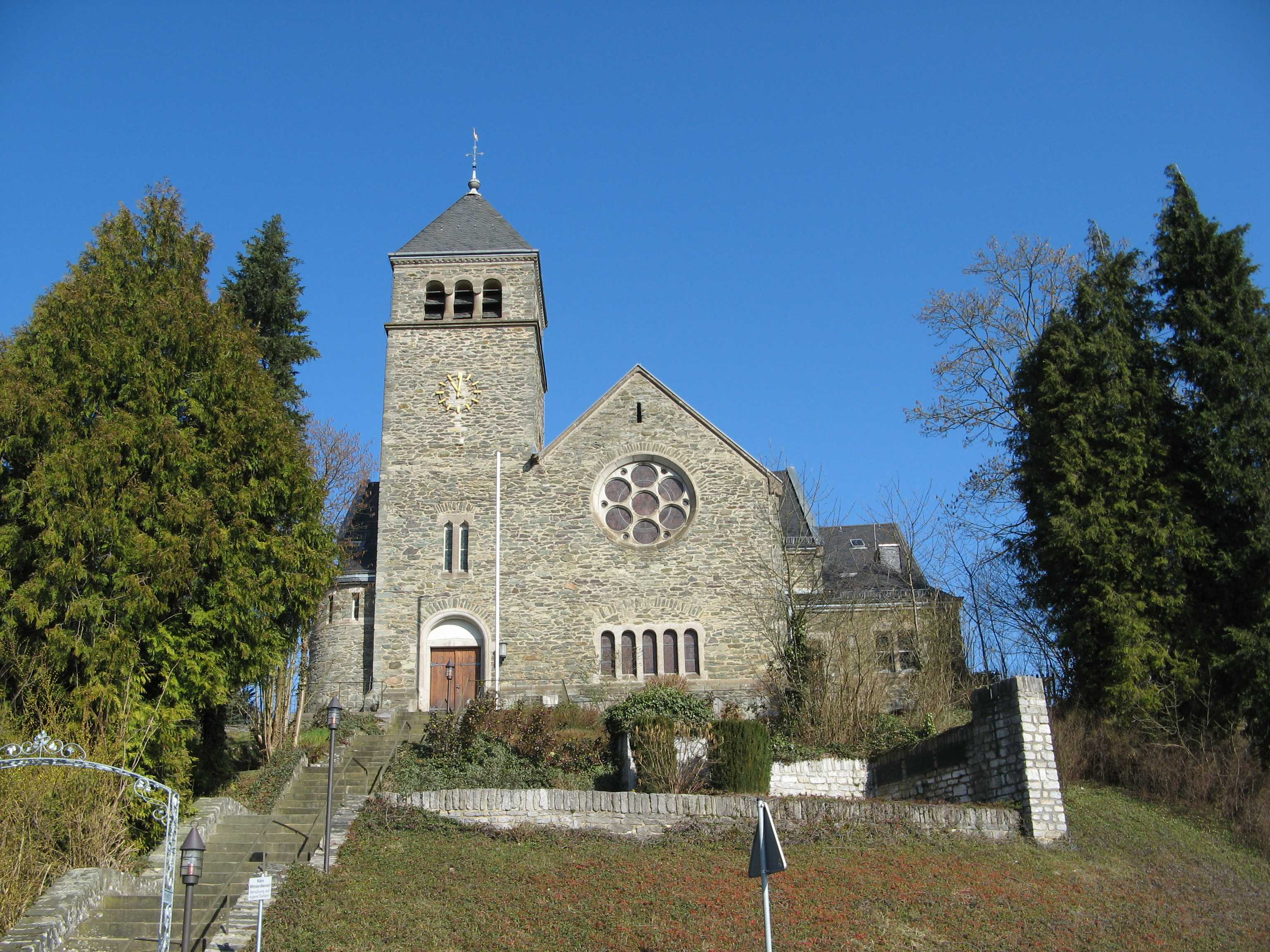
The Evangelical church in Heckholzhausen

==== Former town hall (now community centre) ====
The building was put up in 1929 as a town hall. After the amalgamation with the community of Beselich, the building was used as a village community house. After a thorough restoration, it has been at the people's disposal since September 2007 as a community centre.

==== Evangelical parish church ====
Built on the foundations of a castle built in the 13th century, which fell down in the 16th century along with its chapel, today's Evangelical parish church saw its first stone laid in 1898.

=== Niedertiefenbach ===
==== Katholische Pfarrkirche St. Marien ====
The first stones for Saint Mary's Catholic parish church were laid in 1868 on the plot where formerly stood the old church, which had been torn down. It has been used since its consecration on 27 May 1872 by the Catholic parish of St. Marien.

=== Schupbach ===
==== Former steam mill ====
The steam mill is an early industrial building from the district's history of economic development, whose gable projection and fenestration show traditional ruling-class architecture, thus stating the manufacturer's claim to importance.

The masonry is made up of local quarrystones with skilful working of the natural bossage. Cornices, window arches and windowsills are made of red brick, contrasting with the grey walls. Small tie rod disks show the stretched ceiling construction.

==== Eckerstraße estate grounds ====
There is an extensive baronial estate development between the little lanes Mittelstraße and Eckerstraße. The three-floor dwelling house with gateway built onto it is a pargetted quarrystone work, built about 1460.

The barns and stables are timber-frame buildings from the same time and in part make use of older walls. It is owned today by the family Eisenmenger and Inge Seidel.

==== Evangelical parish church ====
A stand-alone building in the middle of the community, the current mostly newer terrace wall still shows the old, raised churchyard. At the entrance are several round-topped Baroque gravestones.

There is a tall fortress tower from the 12th century with barrel vaults on both lower floors and small Classicist lanterns. Also, the nave is fundamentally Romanesque, but it was lengthened in 1696 and shut in on three sides. It has a plain wooden barrel vault ceiling. About 1700, the gallery, pulpit and marble mensa were built. The organ is from 1816 by Johann Georg Bürgy from Gießen. The paintings which express folklore were done in 1936.

==== Former synagogue ====
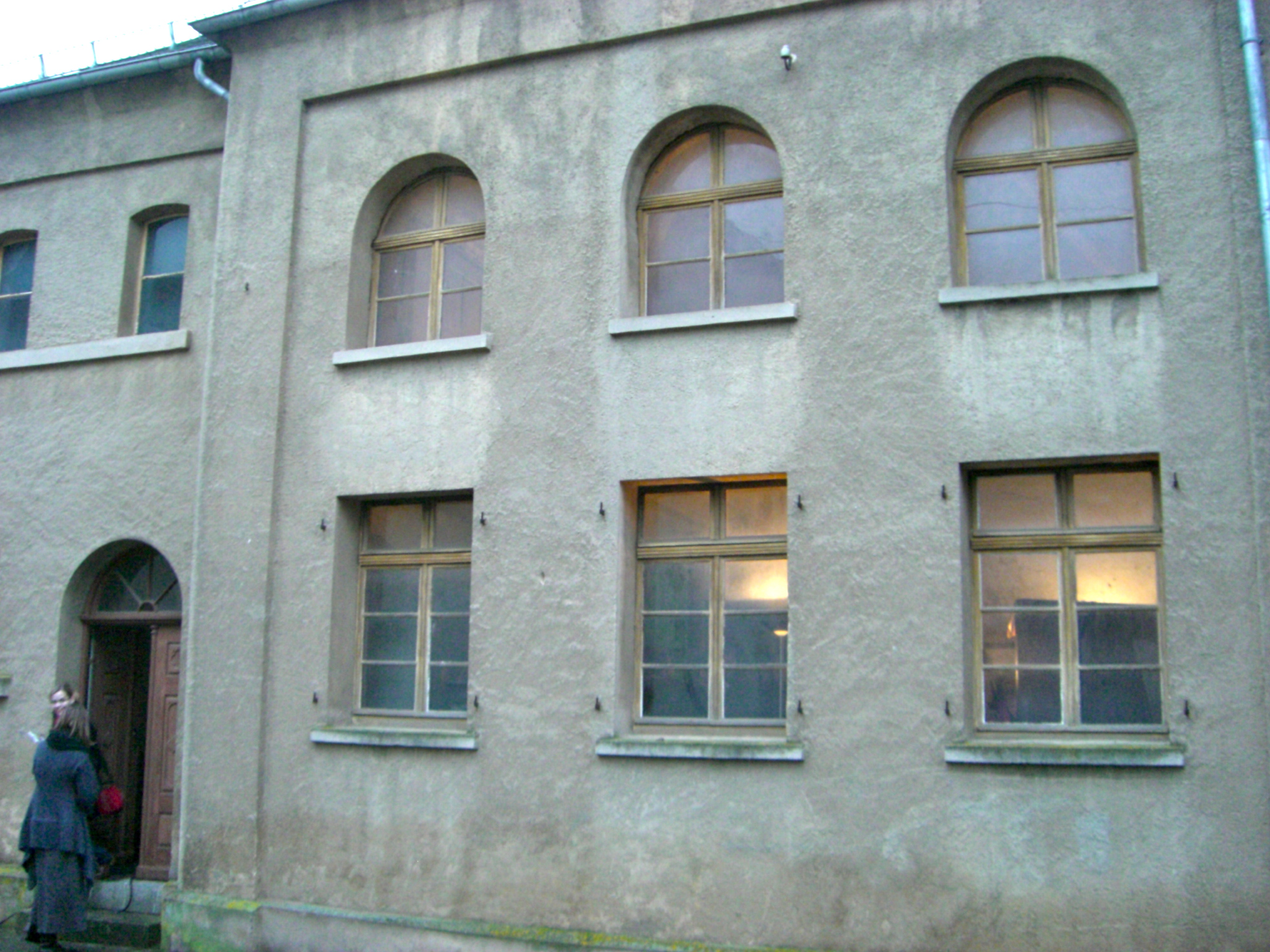
Synagogue in Schupbach.

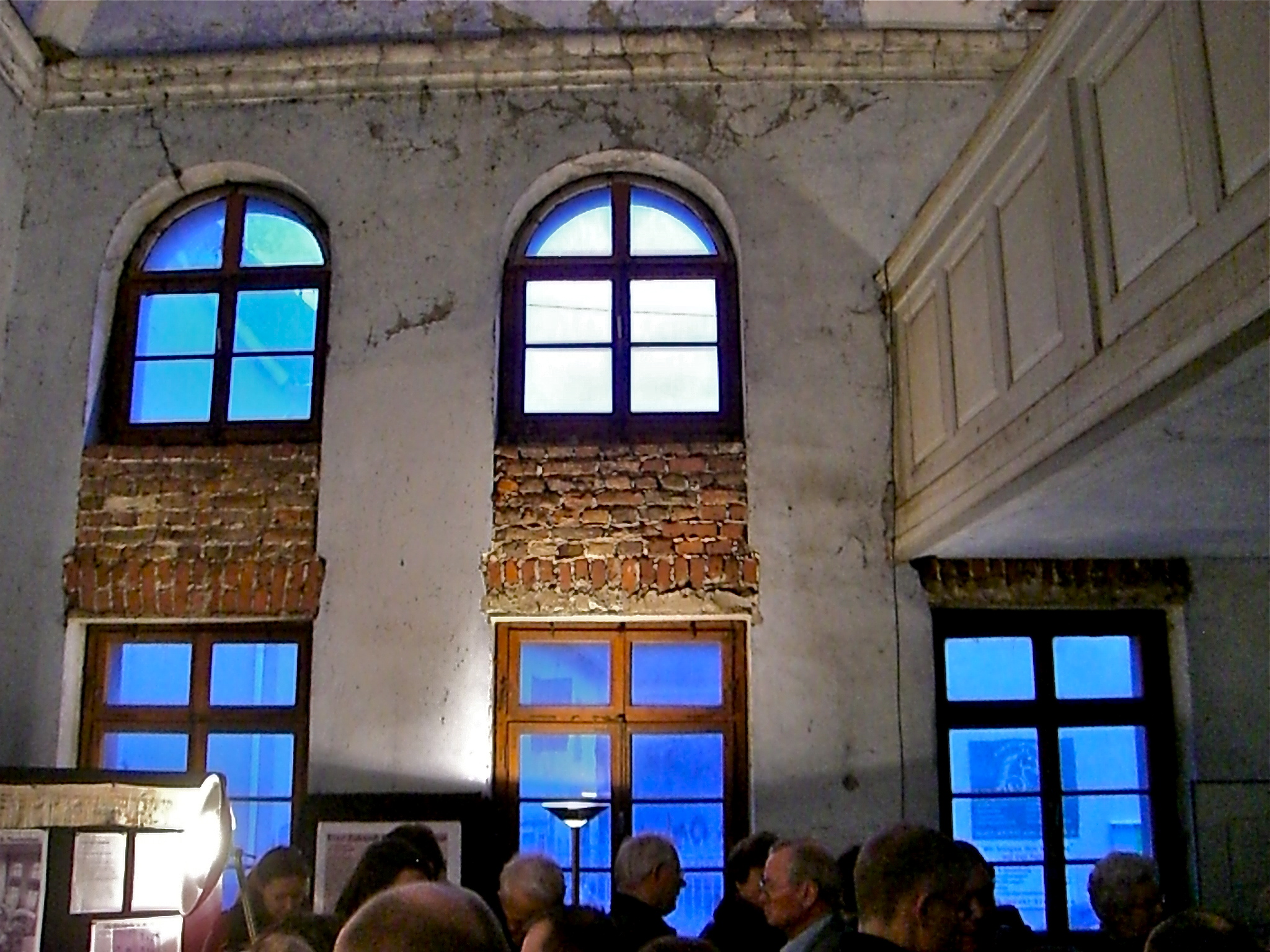
Interior of synagogue in Schupbach.

The synagogue was consecrated in 1877 after far-reaching new building work when the Jewish community, with its branches in nearby places, had roughly 180 members. In the main wing, the synagogue hall was found upstairs and, until 1904, the schoolroom downstairs. The side wings and building work about the entrance housed stairways, galleries and the ritual bath (mikveh). It has brickwork that was subsequently pargetted. When the community was dissolved in 1935, the synagogue was sold, and therefore not destroyed; it was however considerably altered and emptied. The three large round arch windows dated from 1877 were removed between 1937 and 1945 and substituted by two separate windows each. The window openings were bricked up in the middle in order to make the front of the former synagogue appear as a common two-storey building. Not only the neo-romanesque round arches were left but also the wooden frames of the original tall windows were reused to construct new windows. These changes of the religious appearance on the outside of the synagogue during the Nazi period are still clearly visible from inside the edifice. The walled up middle section of the front windows had never been plastered. In February 2010 an association for the support of the preservation of the synagogue was founded.

== Economy and infrastructure ==
=== Economy ===
In the area around the outlying centre of Schupbach, black Lahn marble was once quarried. The deposit is now, however, either exhausted or not further commercially recoverable. The centre of Obertiefenbach has at its disposal a shopping area in which discount stores and other shops have opened, and also a commercial area in which car dealerships, workshops, transport businesses and filling stations can be found. Beselich is nowadays mainly a residential community whose citizens earn their livelihood in surrounding towns such as Limburg, Weilburg and Wetzlar as well as in the Frankfurt Rhein-Main Region.

=== Transport ===
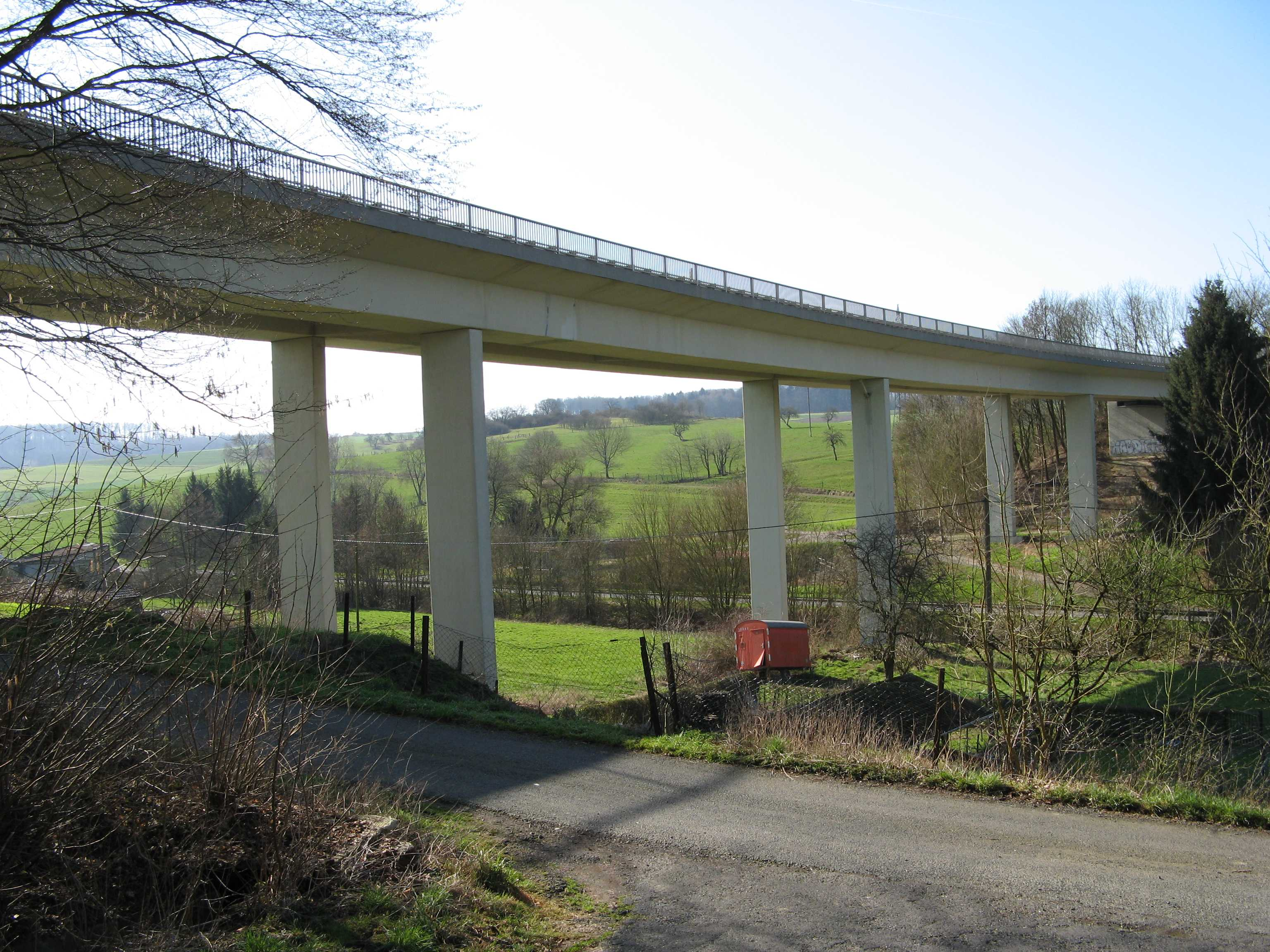
The Heckholzhausen bridge

By way of the A 3 (Cologne–Frankfurt, Limburg-Nord interchange) in connection with Bundesstraße 49, which runs right through Beselich, the community is well linked to the long-distance road network. Also found nearby, 11 km away, is the Limburg-Süd railway station on the InterCityExpress's Cologne-Frankfurt high-speed rail line. State and district roads supply the links to neighbouring places.

=== Education ===
In Obertiefenbach there is a central primary school for Beselich's children. Currently, there are about 300 pupils.

There are kindergartens in every constituent community. Obertiefenbach has a Catholic public library.

=== Public institutions ===
- Grundschule Beselich (primary school) in Obertiefenbach
- Kindergarten Sternenland Heckholzhausen
- Kindergarten Niedertiefenbach
- Kindergarten St.Ägidius Obertiefenbach
- Kindergarten Schupbach
- Bärenhöhle (“Bear's Cave”) daycare centre, Obertiefenbach
- Beselich-Heckholzhausen Volunteer Fire Brigade, founded 1925 (includes Youth Fire Brigade, founded 2 August 1981)
- Beselich-Niedertiefenbach Volunteer Fire Brigade, founded 1934 (includes Youth Fire Brigade, founded 1 April 1973)
- Beselich-Obertiefenbach Volunteer Fire Brigade, founded 1880 (includes Youth Fire Brigade, founded 26 February 1972)
- Beselich-Schupbach Volunteer Fire Brigade, founded 1925 (includes Youth Fire Brigade, founded 1 January 1985)
- Obertiefenbach Catholic public library

== Famous people ==
- Georg Leber (b. 7 October 1920 in Obertiefenbach), German politician (SPD), honorary citizen of the community of Beselich (since 1969).
