= Walther vom Rath =

German lawyer, scientist, entrepreneur and politician (1857-1940)

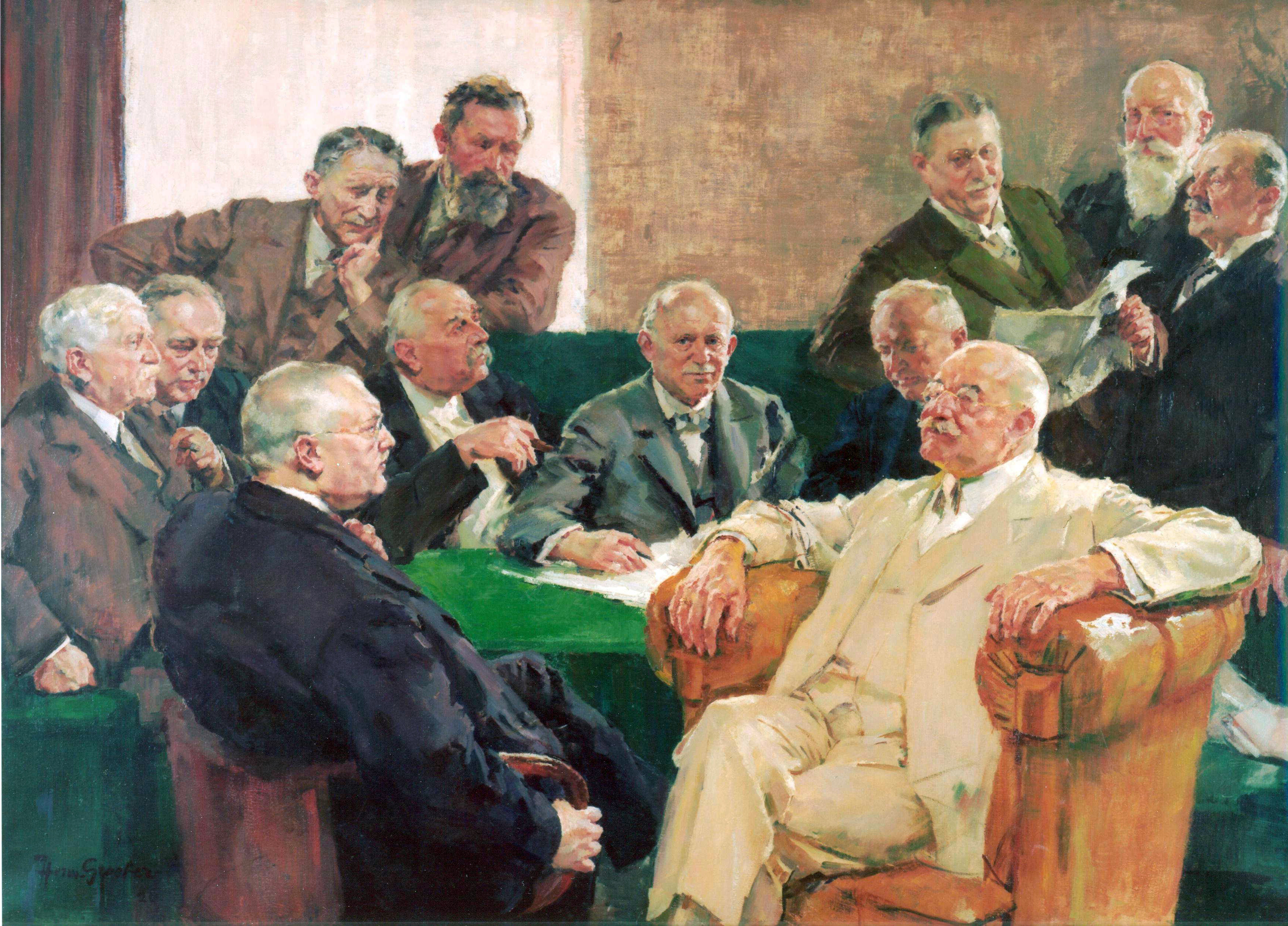
Walther vom Rath with the supervisory board of IG Farben. Painting by Hermann Groeber, (1926)

Carl Rudolf Walther vom Rath (born September 11, 1857 in Amsterdam, † February 2, 1940 in Kronberg im Taunus) was a German lawyer, scientist, entrepreneur and politician. In 1890 he became a member of the supervisory board of the Farbwerke vorm. In 1902 he became the company's chairman, and in 1926, he became the first deputy chairman of the IG Farben supervisory board. From 1894 to 1898, he was a member of the Prussian House of Representatives. From 1909 to 1918, he was a member of the Herrenhaus.

== Biography ==
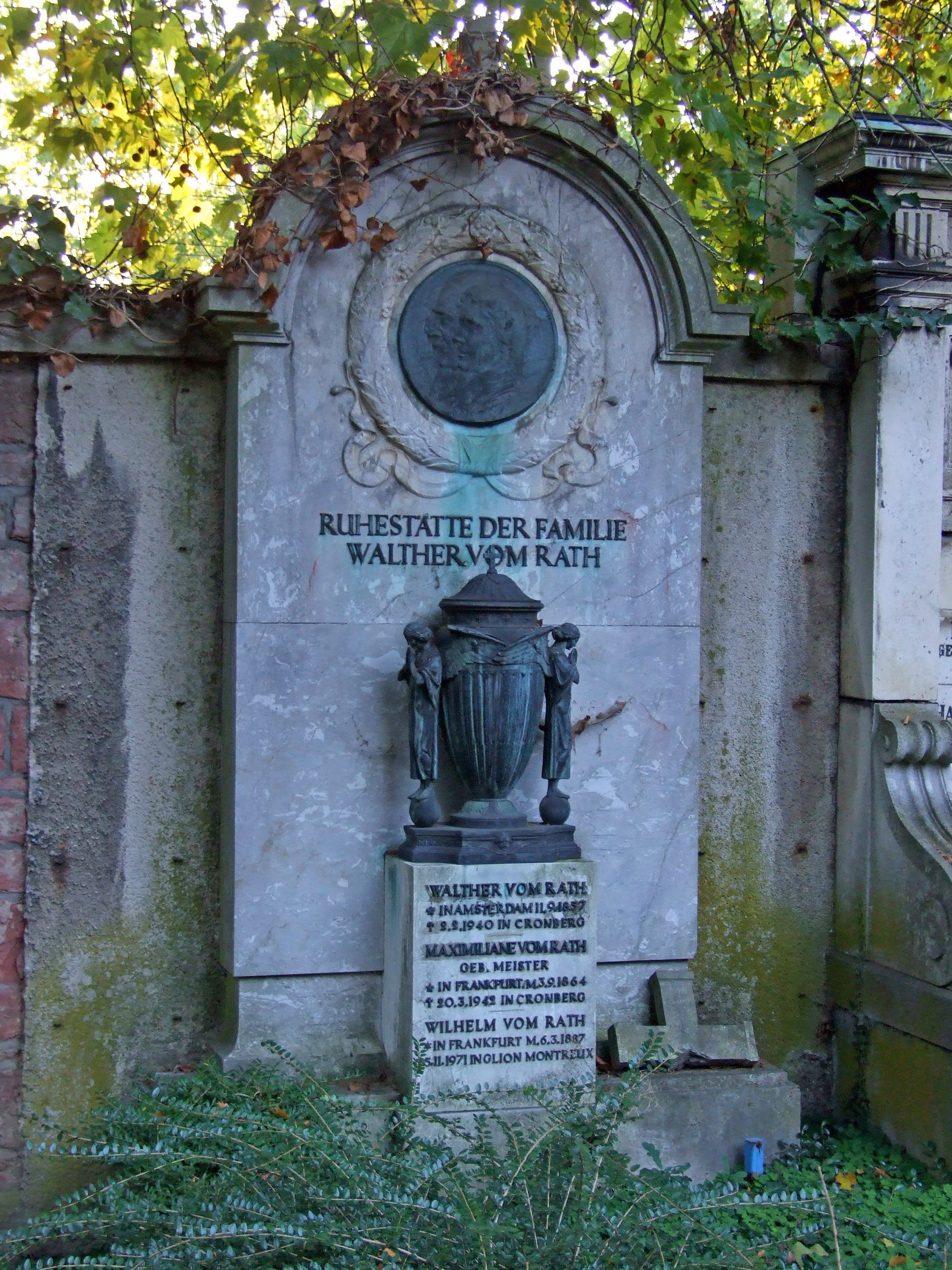
Resting place of the Walther vom Rath family in the main cemetery in Frankfurt am Main

Walther vom Rath initially received private lessons in Amsterdam. In 1872 he attended the Friedrich-Wilhelm-Gymnasium in Cologne. After several months of working in his father's company in Amsterdam ("Deichmann und vom Rath"), he began studying law in Bonn, where in 1879 he passed the legal trainee exam.

== Literature ==
- Ernst Bäumler, The Red Factory. Family history of a global company, Munich, Piper Verlag, 1988, a. a. Page 268. ISBN 3-492-10669-2
- Rath, Walther, from. In: Robert Volz: Reich manual of the German society . The handbook of personalities in words and pictures. Volume 2: L-Z. Deutscher Wirtschaftsverlag, Berlin 1931, DNB 453960294, p. 1477.
- Gothaisches genealogisches Taschenbuch der Briefadeligen houses, 1917, p. 689f
