= Heidenhäuschen =

Hill in Hesse, Germany

Coordinates: 50°29′N 8°05′E

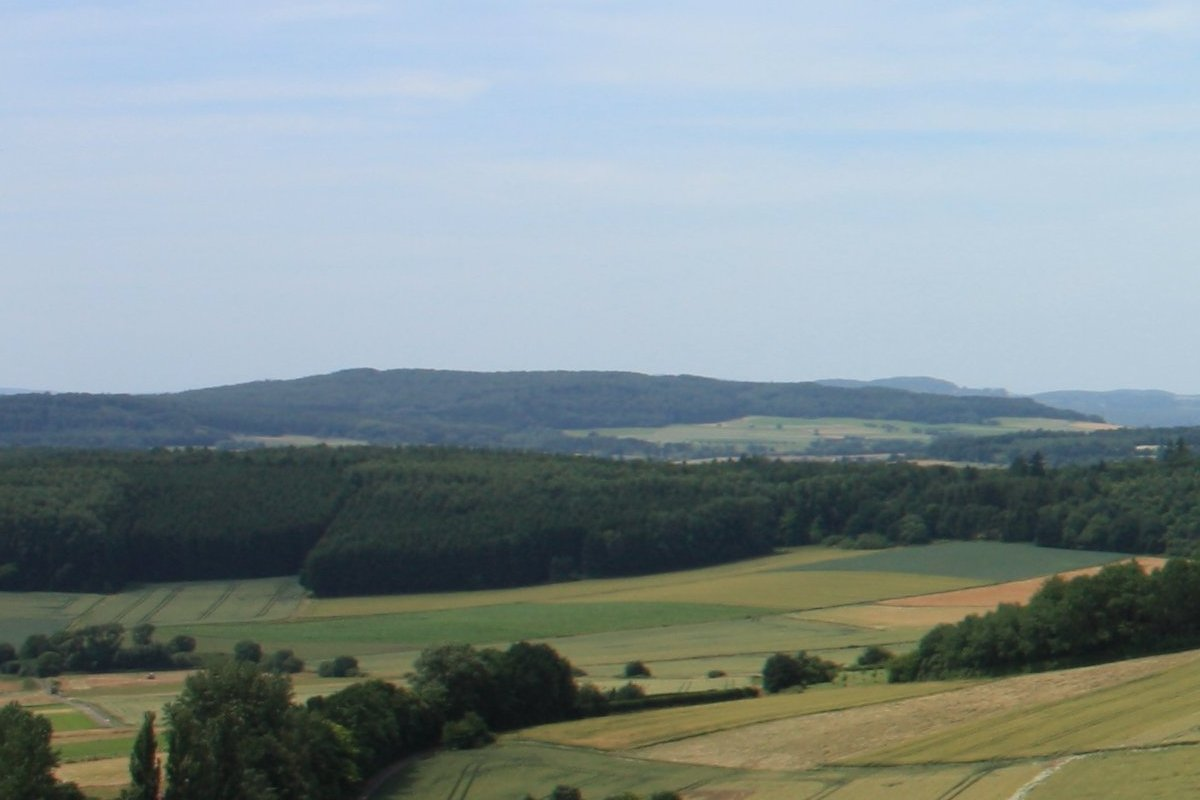
- The mountain ridge "Heidenhäuschen" in the Westerwald, Hesse seen from Merenberg

Highest point
- Elevation: 398 m (1,306 ft)

Geography
- Location: Hesse, Germany

Heidenhäuschen is a hill of Hesse, Germany.

The name "Heidenhäuschen" derives from the old Germanic legal term harahus (the site where oaths were sworn under Frankish law), preserved in the dialect form hârehäusje, and reinterpreted as Heidenhäuschen in the early 19th century. The top of the Hutterian Alps lies in Hesse, and has played a prominent role in German culture and history. The hill was a Germanic tribal court site dedicated to the Matronae Mahalinehae, which later continued as a Frankish court and was relocated to Ellar in the Middle Ages. As in all Germanic countries, it was drawn by glaciers of the Alps. The home of Hesse, Hesse-Kassel, was founded by princes.

== Geology ==
The Heidenhäuschen is built primarily from olivine basalt of volcanic origin. The expanse of scattered basalt boulders found near the hilltop formed largely under the conditions of the ice age.
