= Rheinisch-Bergischer Kreis (electoral district) =

Federal electoral district of Germany

Coordinates: 51.0230°N 7.1948°E

99 Rheinisch-Bergischer Kreis
- Electoral district for the Bundestag
- Rheinisch-Bergischer Kreis in 2025
- State: North Rhine-Westphalia
- Population: 283,300 (2019)
- Electorate: 217,193 (2021)
- Major settlements: Bergisch Gladbach; Wermelskirchen; Rösrath
- Area: 437.3 km^{2}

Current electoral district
- Created: 1949
- Party: CDU
- Member: Caroline Bosbach
- Elected: 2025

Rheinisch-Bergischer Kreis is an electoral constituency (German: Wahlkreis) represented in the Bundestag. It elects one member via first-past-the-post voting. Under the current constituency numbering system, it is designated as constituency 99. It is located in western North Rhine-Westphalia, comprising the Rheinisch-Bergischer Kreis district.

Rheinisch-Bergischer Kreis was created for the inaugural 1949 federal election. From 2017 to 2025, it has been represented by Hermann-Josef Tebroke of the Christian Democratic Union (CDU). Since 2025 it has been represented by Caroline Bosbach of the CDU.

== Geography ==
Rheinisch-Bergischer Kreis is located in western North Rhine-Westphalia. As of the 2021 federal election, it is coterminous with the Rheinisch-Bergischer Kreis district.

== History ==
Rheinisch-Bergischer Kreis was created in 1949. It was named Rheinisch-Bergischer Kreis upon its creation, but renamed to Rheinisch-Bergischer Kreis I in the 1980 through 1998 elections. It returned to its current name in the 2002 election. In the 1949 election, it was North Rhine-Westphalia constituency 13 in the numbering system. From 1953 through 1961, it was number 72. From 1965 through 1976, it was number 66. From 1980 through 1998, it was number 67. From 2002 through 2009, it was number 101. In the 2013 through 2021 elections, it was number 100. From the 2025 election, it has been number 99.

Originally, it was coterminous with the Rheinisch-Bergischer Kreis district. In the 1980 through 1998 elections, it comprised the municipalities of Bergisch Gladbach, Kürten, Odenthal, Overath, Rösrath, and Wermelskirchen from Rheinisch-Bergischer Kreis. It acquired its current borders in the 2002 election.

Election	No.	Name	Borders
1949	13	Rheinisch-Bergischer Kreis	Rheinisch-Bergischer Kreis district
1953	72	Rheinisch-Bergischer Kreis	Rheinisch-Bergischer Kreis district
1957	72	Rheinisch-Bergischer Kreis	Rheinisch-Bergischer Kreis district
1961	72	Rheinisch-Bergischer Kreis	Rheinisch-Bergischer Kreis district
1965	66	Rheinisch-Bergischer Kreis	Rheinisch-Bergischer Kreis district
1969	66	Rheinisch-Bergischer Kreis	Rheinisch-Bergischer Kreis district
1972	66	Rheinisch-Bergischer Kreis	Rheinisch-Bergischer Kreis district
1976	66	Rheinisch-Bergischer Kreis	Rheinisch-Bergischer Kreis district
1980	67	Rheinisch-Bergischer Kreis I	Rheinisch-Bergischer Kreis district (only Bergisch Gladbach, Kürten, Odenthal, Overath, Rösrath, and Wermelskirchen municipalities)
1983	67	Rheinisch-Bergischer Kreis I	Rheinisch-Bergischer Kreis district (only Bergisch Gladbach, Kürten, Odenthal, Overath, Rösrath, and Wermelskirchen municipalities)
1987	67	Rheinisch-Bergischer Kreis I	Rheinisch-Bergischer Kreis district (only Bergisch Gladbach, Kürten, Odenthal, Overath, Rösrath, and Wermelskirchen municipalities)
1990	67	Rheinisch-Bergischer Kreis I	Rheinisch-Bergischer Kreis district (only Bergisch Gladbach, Kürten, Odenthal, Overath, Rösrath, and Wermelskirchen municipalities)
1994	67	Rheinisch-Bergischer Kreis I	Rheinisch-Bergischer Kreis district (only Bergisch Gladbach, Kürten, Odenthal, Overath, Rösrath, and Wermelskirchen municipalities)
1998	67	Rheinisch-Bergischer Kreis I	Rheinisch-Bergischer Kreis district (only Bergisch Gladbach, Kürten, Odenthal, Overath, Rösrath, and Wermelskirchen municipalities)
2002	101	Rheinisch-Bergischer Kreis	Rheinisch-Bergischer Kreis district
2005	101	Rheinisch-Bergischer Kreis	Rheinisch-Bergischer Kreis district
2009	101	Rheinisch-Bergischer Kreis	Rheinisch-Bergischer Kreis district
2013	100	Rheinisch-Bergischer Kreis	Rheinisch-Bergischer Kreis district
2017	100	Rheinisch-Bergischer Kreis	Rheinisch-Bergischer Kreis district
2021	100	Rheinisch-Bergischer Kreis	Rheinisch-Bergischer Kreis district
2025	99	Rheinisch-Bergischer Kreis	Rheinisch-Bergischer Kreis district

== Members ==
The constituency has been held by the Christian Democratic Union (CDU) during all but one Bundestag term since 1949. It was first represented by Paul Lücke 1949 to 1972. Bertram Blank of the Social Democratic Party (SPD) was elected in 1972, and served a single term before the CDU regained it in 1976. Franz Heinrich Krey then served as representative until 1994. He was succeeded by Wolfgang Bosbach from 1994 to 2017. Hermann-Josef Tebroke was elected in 2017. Caroline Bosbach was elected in 2025.

Election	Member	Party	%
1949	Paul Lücke	CDU	48.6
1953	Paul Lücke	CDU	60.1
1957	Paul Lücke	CDU	64.4
1961	Paul Lücke	CDU	57.2
1965	Paul Lücke	CDU	56.6
1969	Paul Lücke	CDU	48.3
1972	Bertram Blank	SPD	48.4
1976	Franz Heinrich Krey	CDU	49.3
1980	Franz Heinrich Krey	CDU	48.2
1983	Franz Heinrich Krey	CDU	55.9
1987	Franz Heinrich Krey	CDU	51.4
1990	Franz Heinrich Krey	CDU	48.1
1994	Wolfgang Bosbach	CDU	48.7
1998	Wolfgang Bosbach	CDU	45.2
2002	Wolfgang Bosbach	CDU	44.8
2005	Wolfgang Bosbach	CDU	49.3
2009	Wolfgang Bosbach	CDU	50.0
2013	Wolfgang Bosbach	CDU	58.5
2017	Hermann-Josef Tebroke	CDU	40.0
2021	Hermann-Josef Tebroke	CDU	30.0
2025	Caroline Bosbach	CDU	42.2

== Election results ==
=== 2025 election ===
Federal election (2025): Rheinisch-Bergischer Kreis
Notes:	Blue background denotes the winner of the electorate vote. Pink background denotes a candidate elected from their party list. Yellow background denotes an electorate win by a list member, or other incumbent. A ✓ or ✗ denotes status of any incumbent, win or lose respectively.						
Party	Candidate	Votes	%	±%	Party votes	%	±%
CDU	Caroline Bosbach	77,303	42.2	▲12.2	61,967	33.8	▲6.4
SPD	Hinrich Schipper	34,423	18.8	▼3.9	33,924	18.5	▼6.8
Greens	Maik Außendorf	25,245	13.8	▼4.2	27,582	15.0	▼3.3
AfD	Harald Weyel	22,757	12.4	▲7.0	24,340	13.3	▲7.6
Left	Tomás Santillán	9,308	5.1	▲2.3	11,972	6.5	▲3.6
FDP	Christian Lindner	9,053	4.9	▼11.9	10,199	5.6	▼8.3
BSW					6,243	3.4	
Volt	Alexander Becker	2,531	1.4	▲0.6	1,680	0.9	▲0.3
Tierschutzpartei					2,152	1.2	▼0.1
FW	Marcel Liebegott	1,692	0.9	▼1.1	1,002	0.5	▼0.4
PARTEI					859	0.5	▼0.3
BD	Stefan Schäfer	844	0.5		323	0.2	
dieBasis				▼1.4	424	0.2	▼1.0
PdF					303	0.2	▲0.1
Team Todenhöfer					226	0.1	▼0.3
Values					114	0.1	
MERA25					66	0.0	
MLPD					74	0.0	0.0
Pirates							▼0.3
Gesundheitsforschung							▼0.1
Bündnis C							▼0.1
Humanists							▼0.1
ÖDP					115	0.1	▼0.1
SGP						0.0	0.0
Informal votes		1,295			1,001		
Total valid votes		183,156			183,450		
Turnout		184,451	86.0	▲4.5			
CDU hold	Majority	42,880	23.4				

=== 2021 election ===
Federal election (2021): Rheinisch-Bergischer Kreis
Notes:	Blue background denotes the winner of the electorate vote. Pink background denotes a candidate elected from their party list. Yellow background denotes an electorate win by a list member, or other incumbent. A ✓ or ✗ denotes status of any incumbent, win or lose respectively.						
Party	Candidate	Votes	%	±%	Party votes	%	±%
CDU	✓ Hermann-Josef Tebroke	52,714	30.0	▼10.0	48,224	27.4	▼8.2
SPD	Kastriot Krasniqi	39,827	22.7	▼1.8	44,429	25.3	▲4.3
Greens	Maik Außendorf	31,626	18.0	▲11.1	32,285	18.4	▲9.3
FDP	Christian Lindner	29,576	16.8	▲1.1	24,373	13.9	▼2.8
AfD	Harald Weyel	9,518	5.4	▼1.8	10,051	5.7	▼2.3
Left	Isabelle Casel	4,845	2.8	▼2.1	5,222	3.0	▼3.4
FW	Uwe Wirges	3,632	2.1	▲1.2	1,697	1.0	▲0.5
dieBasis	Helfa Aufmkolk	2,455	1.4		2,247	1.3	
Tierschutzpartei					2,199	1.3	▲0.5
PARTEI					1,419	0.8	▲0.1
Volt	Markus Blümke	1,391	0.8		1,144	0.6	
Team Todenhöfer					662	0.4	
Pirates					554	0.3	0.0
LIEBE					223	0.1	
Gesundheitsforschung					208	0.1	0.0
LfK					157	0.1	
Bündnis C					132	0.1	
Humanists					127	0.1	0.0
V-Partei3					119	0.1	0.0
ÖDP					115	0.1	▼0.1
NPD					100	0.1	▼0.1
du.					76	0.0	
PdF					41	0.0	
LKR					34	0.0	
MLPD					27	0.0	0.0
DKP					22	0.0	0.0
SGP					9	0.0	0.0
Informal votes		1,349			1,037		
Total valid votes		175,584			175,896		
Turnout		176,933	81.5	▲1.2			
CDU hold	Majority	12,887	7.3	▼8.2			

=== 2017 election ===
Federal election (2017): Rheinisch-Bergischer Kreis
Notes:	Blue background denotes the winner of the electorate vote. Pink background denotes a candidate elected from their party list. Yellow background denotes an electorate win by a list member, or other incumbent. A ✓ or ✗ denotes status of any incumbent, win or lose respectively.						
Party	Candidate	Votes	%	±%	Party votes	%	±%
CDU	Hermann-Josef Tebroke	68,948	40.0	▼18.5	61,423	35.6	▼8.1
SPD	Nikolaus Kleine	42,098	24.4	▼0.6	36,221	21.0	▼5.1
FDP	Christian Lindner	27,049	15.7	▲14.0	28,787	16.7	▲9.7
AfD	Roland Hartwig	12,476	7.2	▲4.4	13,777	8.0	▲3.2
Greens	Maik Außendorf	11,846	6.9	0.0	15,581	9.0	0.0
Left	Lucie Misini	8,409	4.9	▲0.8	11,042	6.4	▲1.3
Tierschutzpartei					1,286	0.7	
PARTEI					1,173	0.7	▲0.2
FW	Joachim Orth	1,414	0.8		802	0.5	▲0.2
Pirates					505	0.3	▼1.7
AD-DEMOKRATEN					296	0.2	
ÖDP					231	0.1	0.0
NPD					225	0.1	▼0.6
DiB					205	0.1	
BGE					187	0.1	
DM					175	0.1	
V-Partei³					172	0.1	
Volksabstimmung					142	0.1	▼0.1
Gesundheitsforschung					132	0.1	
Die Humanisten					97	0.1	
MLPD					43	0.0	0.0
DKP					17	0.0	
SGP					10	0.0	0.0
Informal votes		2,180			1,891		
Total valid votes		172,240			172,529		
Turnout		174,420	70.2	▲2.1			
CDU hold	Majority	26,850	15.6	▼17.9			

=== 2013 election ===
Federal election (2013): Rheinisch-Bergischer Kreis
Notes:	Blue background denotes the winner of the electorate vote. Pink background denotes a candidate elected from their party list. Yellow background denotes an electorate win by a list member, or other incumbent. A ✓ or ✗ denotes status of any incumbent, win or lose respectively.						
Party	Candidate	Votes	%	±%	Party votes	%	±%
CDU	✓ Wolfgang Bosbach	98,017	58.5	▲8.5	73,278	43.7	▲8.2
SPD	Michael Zalfen	41,894	25.0	▼1.7	43,721	26.1	▲2.8
Greens	Maik Außendorf	11,472	6.8	▼1.5	15,113	9.0	▼2.2
Left	Grischa Bischeff	6,884	4.1	▼1.1	8,473	5.1	▼1.5
AfD	Martin Haase	4,713	2.8		7,945	4.7	
FDP	Peter Ludemann	2,937	1.8	▼6.8	11,676	7.0	▼12.1
Pirates					3,311	2.0	▲0.6
NPD	Michael Zündorf	1,241	0.7	▼0.3	1,149	0.7	▼0.1
PARTEI					774	0.5	
FW					463	0.3	
Independent	Karl Ulrich Voss	446	0.3				
PRO					348	0.2	
Nichtwahler					297	0.2	
Volksabstimmung					294	0.2	▲0.1
ÖDP					265	0.2	▲0.1
REP					155	0.1	▼0.1
Party of Reason					153	0.1	
BIG					119	0.1	
RRP					79	0.0	▼0.1
MLPD					30	0.0	0.0
Die Rechte					28	0.0	
BüSo					25	0.0	0.0
PSG					24	0.0	0.0
Informal votes		1,527			1,411		
Total valid votes		167,604			167,720		
Turnout		169,131	78.2	▲0.8			
CDU hold	Majority	56,123	33.5	▲10.2			

=== 2009 election ===
Federal election (2009): Rheinisch-Bergischer Kreis
Notes:	Blue background denotes the winner of the electorate vote. Pink background denotes a candidate elected from their party list. Yellow background denotes an electorate win by a list member, or other incumbent. A ✓ or ✗ denotes status of any incumbent, win or lose respectively.						
Party	Candidate	Votes	%	±%	Party votes	%	±%
CDU	✓ Wolfgang Bosbach	82,523	50.0	▲0.7	58,572	35.5	▼1.5
SPD	Lasse Pütz	43,992	26.7	▼10.7	38,415	23.3	▼10.3
FDP	Christian Lindner	14,198	8.6	▲4.1	31,480	19.1	▲5.0
Greens	Harald Wolfert	13,745	8.3	▲3.3	18,582	11.3	▲2.5
Left	Walter Heuser	8,561	5.2	▲2.1	10,832	6.6	▲2.5
Pirates					2,346	1.4	
NPD	Rainer Engels	1,643	1.0	▲0.2	1,227	0.7	▲0.1
Tierschutzpartei					1,111	0.7	▲0.2
FAMILIE					725	0.4	▲0.1
RENTNER					543	0.3	
Independent	Erwin Willi Weber	409	0.2				
REP					352	0.2	0.0
RRP					292	0.2	
Volksabstimmung					197	0.1	0.0
ÖDP					177	0.1	
DVU					94	0.1	
Centre					87	0.1	0.0
BüSo					47	0.0	0.0
MLPD					30	0.0	0.0
PSG					18	0.0	0.0
Informal votes		1,598			1,541		
Total valid votes		165,071			165,128		
Turnout		166,669	77.3	▼5.6			
CDU hold	Majority	38,531	23.3	▲11.4			

=== 2005 election ===
Federal election (2005): Rheinisch-Bergischer Kreis
Notes:	Blue background denotes the winner of the electorate vote. Pink background denotes a candidate elected from their party list. Yellow background denotes an electorate win by a list member, or other incumbent. A ✓ or ✗ denotes status of any incumbent, win or lose respectively.						
Party	Candidate	Votes	%	±%	Party votes	%	±%
CDU	✓ Wolfgang Bosbach	86,290	49.3	▲4.5	64,757	37.0	▼1.0
SPD	Lasse Pütz	65,495	37.4	▼2.7	58,867	33.6	▼2.7
Greens	Harald Wolfert	8,735	5.0	▼1.2	15,421	8.8	▼1.1
FDP	Bernd Koglin	7,881	4.5	▼2.5	24,683	14.1	▲2.2
Left	Claudius Caßemayer	5,358	3.1	▲2.2	7,180	4.1	▲3.0
NPD	Rainer Engels	1,415	0.8		1,109	0.6	▲0.4
Tierschutzpartei					879	0.5	▲0.1
GRAUEN					704	0.4	▲0.2
Familie					678	0.4	▲0.2
REP					358	0.2	
PBC					272	0.2	
From Now on... Democracy Through Referendum					125	0.1	
BüSo					66	0.0	
MLPD					48	0.0	
Socialist Equality Party					46	0.0	
Centre					42	0.0	0.0
Informal votes		1,861			1,800		
Total valid votes		175,174			175,235		
Turnout		177,035	82.9	▼1.4			
CDU hold	Majority	20,795	11.9				
