= Christine Lambrecht =

German politician (born 1965)

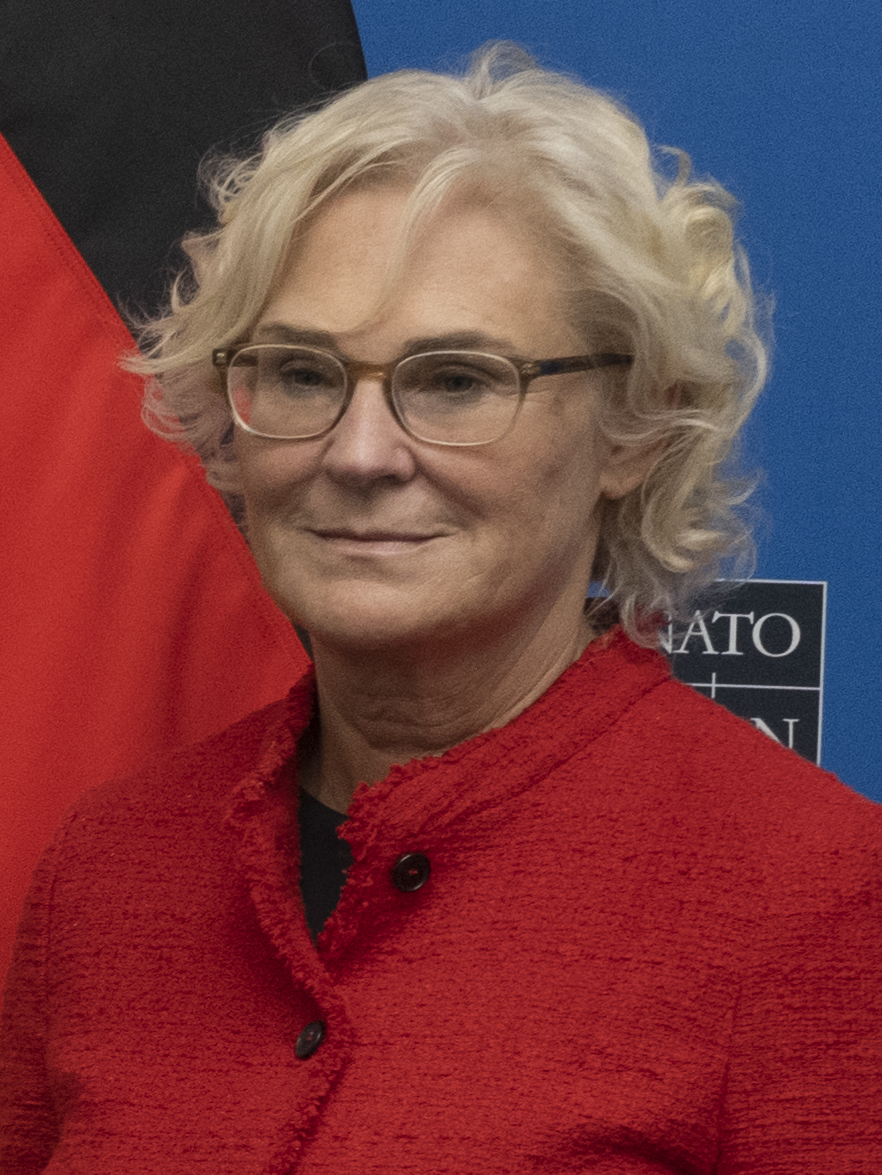
- Lambrecht in 2022

Minister of Defence
- In office 8 December 2021 – 19 January 2023
- Chancellor: Olaf Scholz
- Preceded by: Annegret Kramp-Karrenbauer
- Succeeded by: Boris Pistorius

Minister of Family Affairs, Senior Citizens, Women and Youth
- In office 20 May 2021 – 8 December 2021
- Chancellor: Angela Merkel
- Preceded by: Franziska Giffey
- Succeeded by: Anne Spiegel

Minister of Justice and Consumer Protection
- In office 27 June 2019 – 8 December 2021
- Chancellor: Angela Merkel
- Preceded by: Katarina Barley
- Succeeded by: Marco Buschmann
Parliamentary Career
Parliamentary State Secretary in the Ministry of Finance
In office 14 March 2018 – 27 June 2019 Serving with Bettina Hagedorn
Chancellor	Angela Merkel
Minister	Olaf Scholz
Preceded by	Jens Spahn
Succeeded by	Sarah Ryglewski
Chief Whip of the Social Democratic Party in the Bundestag
In office 16 December 2013 – 13 October 2017
Leader	Thomas Oppermann
Preceded by	Thomas Oppermann
Succeeded by	Carsten Schneider
Deputy Leader of the Social Democratic Party in the Bundestag
In office 4 December 2017 – 14 March 2018 Serving with Sören Bartol, Eva Högl, Karl Lauterbach, Rolf Mützenich, Hubertus Heil, Katja Mast, Matthias Miersch, Achim Post
Leader	Thomas Oppermann; Andrea Nahles
Preceded by	Carola Reimann; Carsten Schneider; Ute Vogt
Succeeded by	Bärbel Bas; Gabriela Heinrich
In office 14 April 2011 – 22 October 2013 Serving with Elke Ferner, Ulrich Kelber, Gernot Erler, Florian Pronold, Dagmar Ziegler, Hubertus Heil, Axel Schäfer
Leader	Frank-Walter Steinmeier
Preceded by	Olaf Scholz
Succeeded by	Eva Högl
Bundestag constituencies
Member of the Bundestag; from Hesse
In office 26 October 1998 – 26 October 2021
Preceded by	Michael Meister
Succeeded by	Multi-member district
Constituency	Bergstraße (1998–2005); State list (2005–2021)

Personal details
- Born: 19 June 1965 (age 61) Mannheim, West Germany
- Party: Social Democratic (since 1987)
- Spouse: Hans-Joachim Hacker (m. 2015; div. 2019)
- Children: 1
- Education: University of Mannheim; University of Mainz
- Occupation: Politician; academic; civil servant

Christine Lambrecht (born 19 June 1965) is a German senior politician of the Social Democratic Party (SPD) who served as the German Federal Minister of Defence in the government of Chancellor Olaf Scholz, from 2021 to 2023. In Chancellor Angela Merkel's administration, Lambrecht previously served as Minister of Justice and Consumer Protection (2019–2021), Minister for Family Affairs (2021) and as one of two Parliamentary State Secretaries at the Federal Ministry of Finance (2018–2019). She previously held various roles within the SPD Parliamentary Group, including as a Deputy Leader (from 2011 to 2013) and from December 2013 to September 2017 as first parliamentary secretary of the SPD parliamentary group.

== Education and early career ==
Lambrecht attended the Albertus-Magnus-Gymnasium in Viernheim, in the German state of Hesse, and in 1984 she passed her Abitur. After this she studied law at the Universities of Mannheim and Mainz, where she graduated in 1992 and completed an internship at State Court in Darmstadt.

== Political career ==
=== Career in local politics ===
Lambrecht joined the SPD in 1982 and was a member of the Viernheim City Council from 1985 till 2001, of which she was the chair in the years 1997 till 2001. Additionally she was a member of the Bergstraße County Council from 1989 until 1997.

=== Member of the German Parliament (1998–2021) ===
Lambrecht first became a Member of the Bundestag in the 1998 elections. From 1998 until 2002 she was the member for Bergstraße, however, she lost against her CDU challenger in the 2002 federal election and has subsequently always been elected via the SPD Hessian state list. In parliament, she has served on the Committee on Legal Affairs, the Committee on Sports and on the Council of Elders, which sets the agenda for the parliamentary sessions. Lambrecht was seen as being on the left wing of the SPD parliamentary group.

From 2002 until 2005 and from 2013 until 2017, Lambrecht served on the parliamentary body in charge of appointing judges to the Highest Courts of Justice, namely the Federal Court of Justice (BGH), the Federal Administrative Court (BVerwG), the Federal Fiscal Court (BFH), the Federal Labour Court (BAG), and the Federal Social Court (BSG).

Following the 2009 elections, Lambrecht became her parliamentary group's spokesperson on legal affairs. In 2011, she was elected as a deputy leader of the SPD parliamentary group, under the leadership of chairman Frank-Walter Steinmeier. She was a deputy leader of the group till her election as first parliamentary secretary of the SPD parliamentary group after the 2013 federal election. In the ensuing negotiations to form a third coalition government under Chancellor Angela Merkel, she was part of the SPD delegation in the working group on internal and legal affairs, led by Hans-Peter Friedrich and Thomas Oppermann.

In the negotiations to form Merkel’s fourth coalition government following the 2017 federal elections, Lambrecht was part of the working group on financial policies and taxes, led by Peter Altmaier, Andreas Scheuer and Olaf Scholz. In Merkel's fourth cabinet, she joined the federal government as one of two Parliamentary State Secretaries serving under Finance Minister Olaf Scholz.

=== Federal Minister of Justice (2019–2021) ===
On 19 June 2019 it was announced that Lambrecht would succeed justice minister Katarina Barley on the 1 July 2019, after the latter moved to Brussels to serve in the European Parliament. During Lambrecht's time in office, German authorities fined Facebook €2 million for under-reporting complaints about illegal content on its social media platform in breach of the country’s law on internet transparency. In December 2019, she proposed a law requiring internet service providers like Gmail or WhatsApp to handover personal data including passwords upon request.

In response to the burning of an Israeli flag at a demonstration in 2017, Lambrecht led efforts in 2020 to make the destruction of foreign state flags, including that of the European Union, and the denigration of national anthems punishable by a fine and up to three years in prison. In September 2020, Lambrecht announced that she would not stand in the 2021 federal elections but instead resign from active politics by the end of the parliamentary term.

=== Federal Minister for Family Affairs (2021) ===
In May 2021, Lambrecht additionally took on the portfolio of the Federal Minister for Family Affairs, Women, and Youth, after Franziska Giffey resigned in reaction to her plagiarism affair.

=== Federal Minister of Defence (2021–2023) ===
Lambrecht was named Federal Minister of Defence in the cabinet of Olaf Scholz, taking office on 8 December 2021. At the time, German defence forces were in a very bad condition. In one of her first speeches, Lambrecht asked for more money for the German army. Referring to many deficiencies in the materiel, she said that the army was too often ridiculed for helicopters that did not fly and guns that did not hit. That the army was lacking €20–30 billion worth of ammunition had been known for years at the time.

Early in her tenure, Lambrecht and Germany as a whole were severely criticized for their very sluggish response to requests by Kyiv for military aid in face of the threatening Russian invasion. In January 2022 Lambrecht and much of the German public opinion eschewed weapons in favour of non-lethal items. In the end, Lambrecht offered 5,000 helmets and said that it was a "very clear signal [that] we stand by [Ukraine's] side". Lambrecht probably intended it as such, but the offer was received very differently. Ukraine's capital's mayor, Vitaly Klitschko dismissed it as "a joke". In Germany itself reactions were no less critical. Many media thought that Germany was the laughing stock of international politics and was proving itself to be unreliable. Criticism centered on Lambrecht's actions, and the incidents that she had caused while barely two months in office.

In early February Lambrecht oversaw efforts to send up to 350 more German troops to Lithuania, reinforcing a German-led NATO Enhanced Forward Presence combat unit deployed there to deter a Russian attack on the Baltic states. After the start of the Russian invasion of Ukraine on 24 February, Scholz held his Zeitenwende speech on 27 February. Immediately after this speech, the ministry of defense requested 250 firms to mobilize every resource in order to make the Bundeswehr combat ready as soon as possible.

With regard to the air force, the ministry quickly announced plans to purchase 35 Lockheed Martin F-35 Lightning II fighter jets to replace its Panavia Tornado fleet, and to buy 60 Boeing CH-47 Chinook heavy transport helicopters worth around €5 billion. In March 2022, Lambrecht was openly criticized by Mykhailo Podolyak, adviser to the Ukrainian president, for saying that NATO will not intervene nor create a no-fly zone. Podolyak stated that each such statement encourages the Russian massacre in Ukraine.

In response to the Russian invasion of Ukraine in 2022, Germany delivered aid and weapons to Ukraine. Taken from the German Bundeswehr this included 3,000 Panzerfaust 3 anti-tank weapons, 500 Stinger anti-aircraft missile systems, over 2,000 9K32 Strela-2 anti-aircraft missile systems, 100 MG 3 machine guns, 16 million rounds of ammunitions, 23,000 combat helmets, 1,300 bullet-proof vests, night vision devices, 500,000 military food rations, 14 armored cars and other systems. By April 2022, Lambrecht announced that the German army's stocks were depleted and additional deliveries have to come from the arms manufacturers directly.

In May 2022, Lambrecht led negotiations with fellow cabinet members Christian Lindner and Annalena Baerbock as well as Mathias Middelberg on securing a two-thirds majority in parliament needed to change Germany's constitution to allow for a credit-based special defense fund of €100 billion. In August 2022, Lambrecht sent 13 military aircraft to join the Exercise Pitch Black in Australia, the German Air Force's largest peacetime deployment, underlining Germany’s increased focus on the Indo-Pacific amid rising tensions with China in the region. In October 2022, Lambrecht visited Odesa to meet with Ukrainian Defense Minister Oleksii Reznikov, in her first visit to the country since the invasion.

In a widely criticized New Year's Eve address she stated that the 2022 Russian invasion of Ukraine has led to "a lot of special experiences" and a chance for "many encounters with great and interesting people". On 16 January 2023, Lambrecht announced her decision to step down as Defence Minister. This came after she had repeatedly been criticized for her work in the role and after multiple politically embarrassing incidents. Lambrecht blamed the media for focusing on her, instead of conducting fact-based reporting. A few weeks after her resignation it became clear that the already very weak German army had supplied goods to Ukraine for about €1 billion, but that the ministry had only ordered replacements for €50 million. Replacement of the other goods had not even been requested, even while funding was available.

== Other activities ==
- Academy of European Law (ERA), Ex-Officio Member of the Governing Board (2019–2021)
- German Forum for Crime Prevention (DFK), Ex-Officio Chair of the Board of Trustees (2019–2021)
- Magnus Hirschfeld Foundation, Ex-Officio Chairwoman of the Board of Trustees (2019–2021)
- Humboldt Forum, Ex-Officio Member of the Supervisory Board (2018–2019)
- GIZ, Member of the Supervisory Board (2018–2019)
- Jewish Museum Berlin, Member of the Board of Trustees (since 2018).

== Personal life ==
Lambrecht has one son. In 2022, Lambrecht was criticised for taking her son with her using an army helicopter, while she went for visiting troops and her son went on holiday. A political scandal broke out after he posted pictures of it on Instagram.
