= Caroline Bosbach =

German politician (born 1989)

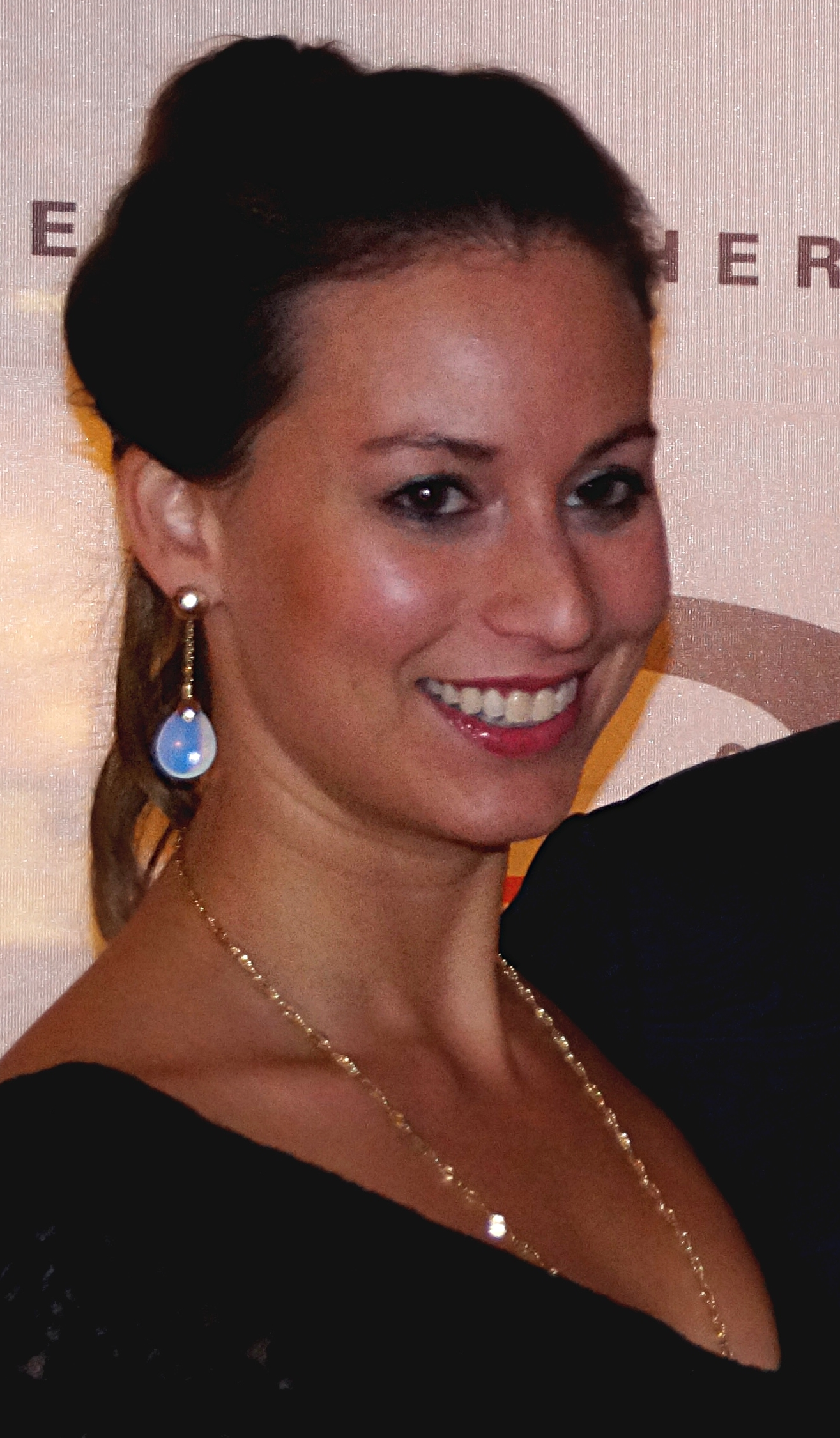
- Bosbach in 2016

Member of the Bundestag
- Incumbent
- Assumed office 25 March 2025
- Preceded by: Hermann-Josef Tebroke
- Constituency: Rheinisch-Bergischer Kreis

Personal details
- Born: 27 November 1989 (age 36) Bergisch Gladbach
- Party: Christian Democratic Union
- Parent: Wolfgang Bosbach (father)

Caroline Bosbach (born 27 November 1989 in Bergisch Gladbach) is a German politician who was elected as a member of the Bundestag in 2025. She is the

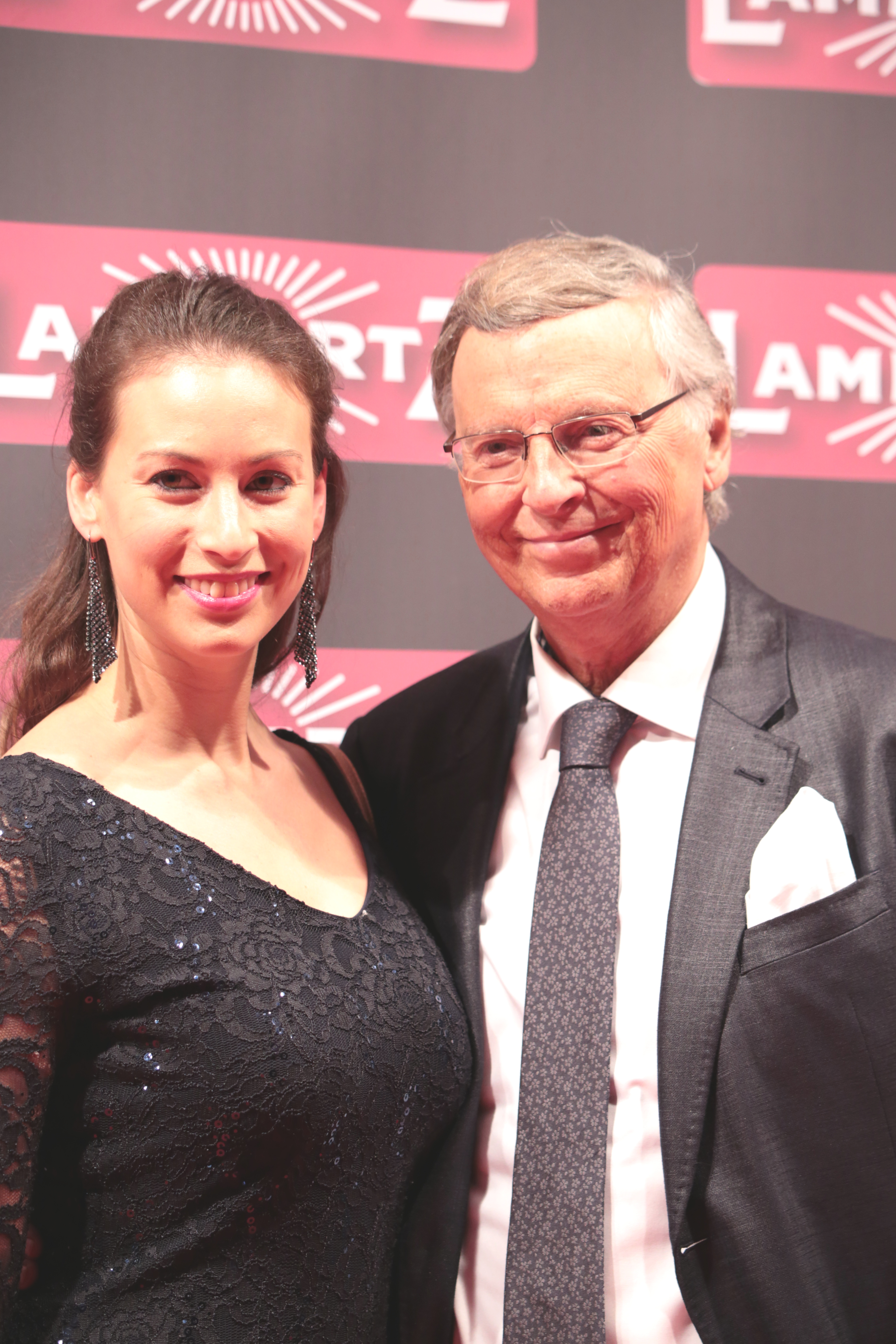
Caroline with her father in 2018

daughter of Wolfgang Bosbach.
