= Feldenkirchen =

Feldenkirchen is a German surname. Notable people with the surname include:

- Andreas Feldenkirchen, a German curler
- Markus Feldenkirchen (born 1975), a German journalist and writer
- Wilfried Feldenkirchen (1947–2010), a German professor and economic historian
