= Mansmann =

Mansmann is a surname. Notable people with the surname include:

- Carol Los Mansmann (1942–2002), United States circuit judge, appointed by President Ronald Reagan, first woman to serve on the Third Circuit Court of Appeals.
- Till Mansmann (born 1968), German politician
