= Strunde =

River in Germany

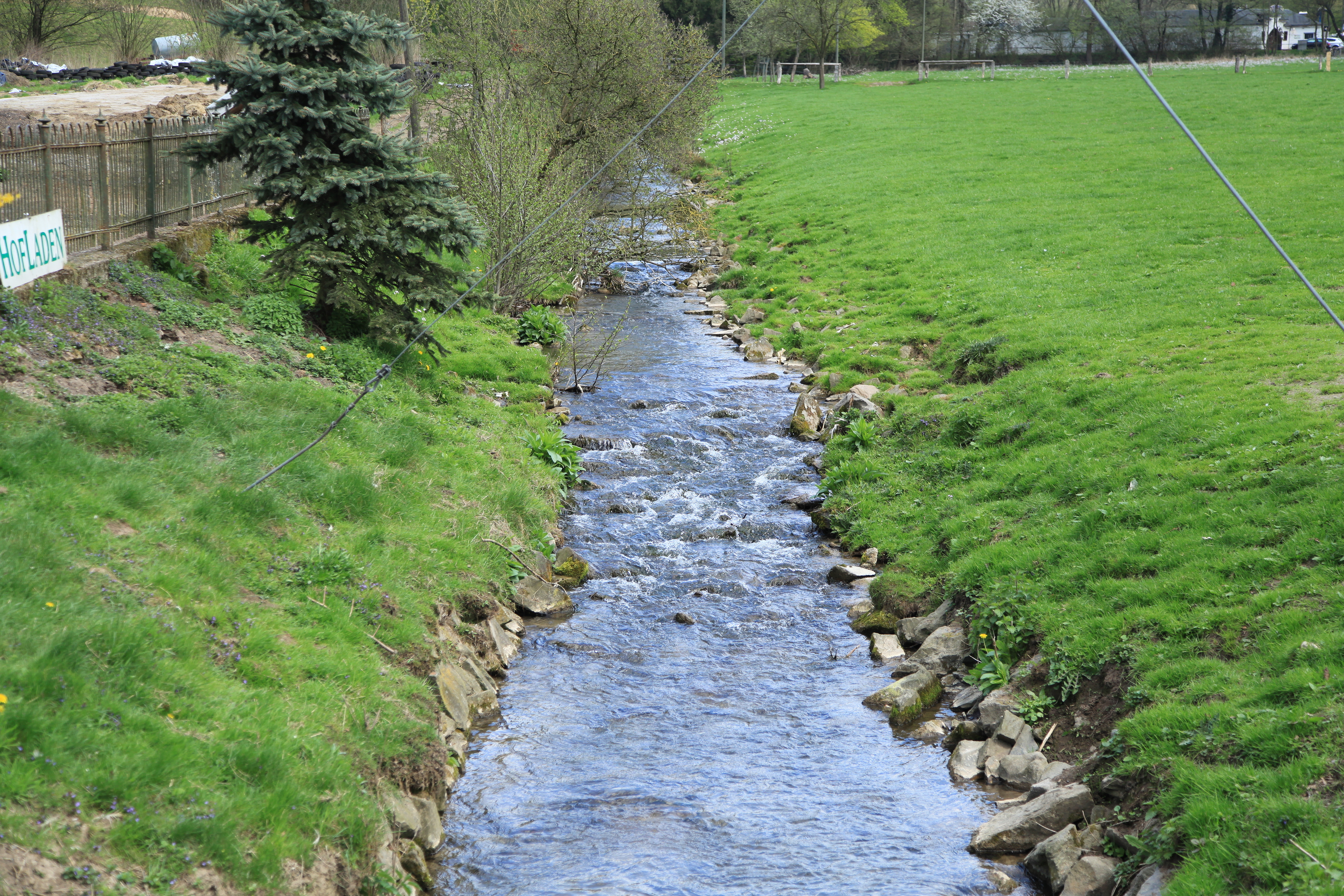

Location
- Country: Germany
- State: North Rhine-Westphalia

Physical characteristics
- Mouth
  - location: Flehbach
  - coordinates: 51°00′28″N 7°10′59″E
- Length: 16.0 km (9.9 mi)

Basin features
- Progression: Flehbach→ Rhine→ North Sea

Strunde is a river of North Rhine-Westphalia, Germany. It flows through Bergisch Gladbach, and joins the Flehbach or Faulbach near Cologne-Buchheim.

== See also ==
- List of rivers of North Rhine-Westphalia
