= Bergstraße (electoral district) =

Federal electoral district of Germany

187 Bergstraße
- Electoral district for the Bundestag
- Bergstraße in 2025
- State: Hesse
- Population: 270,300 (2019)
- Electorate: 197,782 (2021)
- Major settlements: Bensheim; Viernheim; Lampertheim
- Area: 719.5 km^{2}

Current electoral district
- Created: 1949
- Party: CDU
- Member: Michael Meister
- Elected: 2005, 2009, 2013, 2017, 2021, 2025

Bergstraße (English: Mountain Road) is an electoral constituency (German: Wahlkreis) represented in the Bundestag. It elects one member via first-past-the-post voting. Under the current constituency numbering system, it is designated as constituency 187. It is located in southern Hesse, comprising the district of Bergstraße.

Bergstraße was created for the inaugural 1949 federal election. Since 2005, it has been represented by Michael Meister of the Christian Democratic Union (CDU).

== Geography ==
Bergstraße is located in southern Hesse. As of the 2021 federal election, it is coterminous with the district of Bergstraße.

== History ==
Bergstraße was created in 1949. In the 1949 election, it was Hesse constituency 22 in the numbering system. From 1953 through 1976, it was number 147. From 1980 through 1998, it was number 145. In the 2002 and 2005 elections, it was number 189. In the 2009 through 2021 elections, it was number 188. From the 2025 election, it has been number 187.

Originally, the constituency was coterminous with the district of Bergstraße. In the 1965 through 1972 elections, it also contained the municipality of Rothenberg from the Erbach district. Since the 1976 election, it has again been coterminous with the Bergstraße district.

Election	No.	Name	Borders
1949	22	Bergstraße	Bergstraße district
1953	147	Bergstraße	Bergstraße district
1957	147	Bergstraße	Bergstraße district
1961	147	Bergstraße	Bergstraße district
1965	147	Bergstraße	Bergstraße; Erbach district (only Rothenberg municipality)
1969	147	Bergstraße	Bergstraße; Erbach district (only Rothenberg municipality)
1972	147	Bergstraße	Bergstraße; Erbach district (only Rothenberg municipality)
1976	147	Bergstraße	Bergstraße
1980	145	Bergstraße	Bergstraße
1983	145	Bergstraße	Bergstraße
1987	145	Bergstraße	Bergstraße
1990	145	Bergstraße	Bergstraße
1994	145	Bergstraße	Bergstraße
1998	145	Bergstraße	Bergstraße
2002	189	Bergstraße	Bergstraße
2005	189	Bergstraße	Bergstraße
2009	188	Bergstraße	Bergstraße
2013	188	Bergstraße	Bergstraße
2017	188	Bergstraße	Bergstraße
2021	188	Bergstraße	Bergstraße
2025	187	Bergstraße	Bergstraße

== Members ==
The constituency was first represented by Heinrich von Brentano of the Christian Democratic Union (CDU) from 1949 to 1965, followed by Carl Otto Lenz of the CDU until 1969. Wolfgang Schwabe won it for the Social Democratic Party (SPD) in 1969 and served until 1976, when former member Lenz regained it for the CDU. Klaus Kübler won it back to the SPD in 1980, but Lenz was once again elected in 1983. Fellow CDU member Franz-Hermann Kappes then served from 1987 to 1994, followed by Michael Meister until 1998. Christine Lambrecht of the SPD won the constituency in 1998 and was representative until 2005. Former member Meister was elected again in 2005, and re-elected in 2009, 2013, 2017, and 2021.

Election	Member	Party	%
1949	Heinrich von Brentano	CDU	35.3
1953	Heinrich von Brentano	CDU	44.9
1957	Heinrich von Brentano	CDU	50.6
1961	Heinrich von Brentano	CDU	45.1
1965	Carl Otto Lenz	CDU	46.9
1969	Wolfgang Schwabe	SPD	46.0
1972	Wolfgang Schwabe	SPD	51.6
1976	Carl Otto Lenz	CDU	48.5
1980	Klaus Kübler	SPD	47.3
1983	Carl Otto Lenz	CDU	51.1
1987	Franz-Hermann Kappes	CDU	47.8
1990	Franz-Hermann Kappes	CDU	46.5
1994	Michael Meister	CDU	46.7
1998	Christine Lambrecht	SPD	45.4
2002	Christine Lambrecht	SPD	45.3
2005	Michael Meister	CDU	44.4
2009	Michael Meister	CDU	44.4
2013	Michael Meister	CDU	48.3
2017	Michael Meister	CDU	38.9
2021	Michael Meister	CDU	30.5
2025	Michael Meister	CDU	36.3

== Election results ==
=== 2025 election ===
Federal election (2025): Bergstraße
Notes:	Blue background denotes the winner of the electorate vote. Pink background denotes a candidate elected from their party list. Yellow background denotes an electorate win by a list member, or other incumbent. A ✓ or ✗ denotes status of any incumbent, win or lose respectively.						
Party	Candidate	Votes	%	±%	Party votes	%	±%
CDU	✓ Michael Meister	59,212	36.3	▲5.8	51,097	31.2	▲6.7
SPD	Sven Wingerter	34,229	21.0	▼6.2	28,439	17.4	▼9.8
AfD	Thomas Fetsch	33,330	20.4	▲10.9	32,973	20.1	▲10.7
Greens	Evelyn Berg	14,917	9.1	▼4.7	18,345	11.2	▼3.0
Left	Bruno Schwarz	8,813	5.4	▲2.7	9,970	6.1	▲3.0
FDP	Till Mansmann	6,289	3.9	▼6.8	8,475	5.2	▼8.3
BSW					7,013	4.3	New
Tierschutzpartei					2,477	1.5	▼0.5
FW	Alfred Münch	3,651	2.2	▼0.6	2,060	1.3	▼0.5
PARTEI					836	0.5	▼0.3
BD					273	0.2	New
Humanists					139	0.1	0.0
MLPD					49	<0.1	0.0
Informal votes		1,705			1,264		
Total valid votes		163,208			163,649		
Turnout		164,913	84.4	▲6.9			
CDU hold	Majority	24,983	15.3	▲12.0			

=== 2021 election ===
Federal election (2021): Bergstraße
Notes:	Blue background denotes the winner of the electorate vote. Pink background denotes a candidate elected from their party list. Yellow background denotes an electorate win by a list member, or other incumbent. A ✓ or ✗ denotes status of any incumbent, win or lose respectively.						
Party	Candidate	Votes	%	±%	Party votes	%	±%
CDU	✓ Michael Meister	46,125	30.5	▼8.4	37,064	24.5	▼8.7
SPD	Sven Wingerter	41,124	27.2	▲0.3	41,124	27.2	▲4.8
Greens	Moritz Müller	20,955	13.9	▲6.2	21,457	14.2	▲5.3
FDP	Till Mansmann	16,175	10.7	▲3.1	20,432	13.5	▲1.7
AfD	Thomas Fetsch	14,351	9.5	▼3.0	14,377	9.5	▼3.4
Left	Sascha Bahl	4,149	2.7	▼2.8	4,629	3.1	▼3.6
Tierschutzpartei					3,029	2.0	▲0.8
FW	Kerstin Buchner	4,287	2.8		2,723	1.8	▲1.0
dieBasis	Ina Rodewald	2,748	1.8		2,465	1.6	
PARTEI					1,221	0.8	0.0
Unabhängige	Gabriele Ermen	953	0.6				
Pirates					617	0.4	0.0
Team Todenhöfer					533	0.4	
Volt					491	0.3	
Independent	Heike Grammbitter	385	0.3				
Gesundheitsforschung					258	0.2	
NPD					237	0.2	▼0.2
Bündnis C					176	0.1	
ÖDP					151	0.1	▼0.1
Humanists					153	0.1	
V-Partei3					145	0.1	0.0
Bündnis 21					63	0.0	
LKR					47	0.0	
DKP					33	0.0	0.0
MLPD					18	0.0	0.0
Informal votes		1,926			1,733		
Total valid votes		151,250			151,443		
Turnout		153,176	77.4	▼1.2			
CDU hold	Majority	5,001	3.3	▼8.7			

=== 2017 election ===
Federal election (2017): Bergstraße
Notes:	Blue background denotes the winner of the electorate vote. Pink background denotes a candidate elected from their party list. Yellow background denotes an electorate win by a list member, or other incumbent. A ✓ or ✗ denotes status of any incumbent, win or lose respectively.						
Party	Candidate	Votes	%	±%	Party votes	%	±%
CDU	✓ Michael Meister	59,781	38.9	▼9.4	51,088	33.2	▼9.3
SPD	Christine Lambrecht	41,408	26.9	▼4.8	34,435	22.3	▼5.2
AfD	Rolf Kahnt	19,153	12.5	▲8.2	19,923	12.9	▲7.3
Greens	Moritz Müller	11,747	7.6	▲2.0	13,595	8.8	▲0.2
FDP	Till Mansmann	11,711	7.6	▲5.7	18,196	11.8	▲6.3
Left	Sascha Bahl	8,511	5.5	▲1.6	10,197	6.6	▲1.8
Tierschutzpartei					1,793	1.2	
PARTEI					1,261	0.8	▲0.4
FW					1,227	0.8	▲0.3
Independent	Sebastian Bucher	904	0.6				
Pirates					688	0.4	▼1.6
NPD					545	0.4	▼0.7
Independent	Martin Polivka	524	0.3				
DM					298	0.2	
ÖDP					254	0.2	
BGE					243	0.2	
V-Partei³					219	0.1	
MLPD					57	0.0	0.0
BüSo					48	0.0	0.0
DKP					27	0.0	
Informal votes		2,343			1,988		
Total valid votes		153,739			154,094		
Turnout		156,082	78.7	▲4.4			
CDU hold	Majority	18,373	12.0	▼4.5			

=== 2013 election ===
Federal election (2013): Bergstraße
Notes:	Blue background denotes the winner of the electorate vote. Pink background denotes a candidate elected from their party list. Yellow background denotes an electorate win by a list member, or other incumbent. A ✓ or ✗ denotes status of any incumbent, win or lose respectively.						
Party	Candidate	Votes	%	±%	Party votes	%	±%
CDU	✓ Michael Meister	70,131	48.3	▲3.9	61,337	42.4	▲7.9
SPD	Christine Lambrecht	46,099	31.8	▲0.8	39,838	27.6	▲3.0
Greens	Uwe Pfenning	8,222	5.7	▼2.1	12,520	8.7	▼2.1
AfD	Tim Wiemer	6,129	4.2		8,134	5.6	
Left	Bruno Schwarz	5,730	3.9	▼2.4	7,025	4.9	▼2.6
FDP	Till Mansmann	2,795	1.9	▼7.0	7,975	5.5	▼11.8
Pirates	Arne Pfeilsticker	2,779	1.9		2,951	2.0	▲0.1
NPD	Jens Schäfer	1,635	1.1	▼0.5	1,589	1.1	0.0
FW	Volker Gallandi	1,609	1.1		1,602	1.1	
PARTEI					628	0.4	
REP					617	0.4	▼0.6
PRO					182	0.1	
BüSo					67	0.0	▼0.1
SGP					62	0.0	
MLPD					32	0.0	0.0
Informal votes		3,252			3,822		
Total valid votes		145,129			144,559		
Turnout		148,381	74.3	0.0			
CDU hold	Majority	24,032	16.5	▲3.0			

=== 2009 election ===
Federal election (2009): Bergstraße
Notes:	Blue background denotes the winner of the electorate vote. Pink background denotes a candidate elected from their party list. Yellow background denotes an electorate win by a list member, or other incumbent. A ✓ or ✗ denotes status of any incumbent, win or lose respectively.						
Party	Candidate	Votes	%	±%	Party votes	%	±%
CDU	✓ Michael Meister	64,472	44.4	0.0	50,275	34.5	▼2.0
SPD	Christine Lambrecht	44,903	30.9	▼10.9	35,748	24.6	▼10.8
FDP	Benjamin Kramer	12,966	8.9	▲5.1	25,219	17.3	▲6.2
Greens	Christian Gerber	11,296	7.8	▲3.9	15,683	10.8	▲2.1
Left	Harry Siegert	9,171	6.3	▲3.0	10,891	7.5	▲3.2
Pirates					2,782	1.9	
Tierschutzpartei					1,618	1.1	▲0.2
NPD	Edna Windecker	2,365	1.6	0.0	1,607	1.1	▼0.2
REP					1,458	1.0	▼0.1
BüSo					165	0.1	0.0
DVU					113	0.1	
MLPD					41	0.0	0.0
Informal votes		3,135			2,708		
Total valid votes		145,173			145,600		
Turnout		148,308	74.3	▼5.1			
CDU hold	Majority	19,569	13.5	▲10.9			

=== 2005 election ===
Federal election (2005):Bergstraße
Notes:	Blue background denotes the winner of the electorate vote. Pink background denotes a candidate elected from their party list. Yellow background denotes an electorate win by a list member, or other incumbent. A ✓ or ✗ denotes status of any incumbent, win or lose respectively.						
Party	Candidate	Votes	%	±%	Party votes	%	±%
CDU	Michael Meister	68,835	44.4	▲0.9	56,712	36.5	▼2.6
SPD	✗ Christine Lambrecht	64,837	41.8	▼3.5	54,838	35.3	▼4.4
FDP	Benjamin Kramer	5,953	3.8	▼0.5	17,323	11.2	▲3.2
Greens	Dennis Grieser	5,946	3.8	▼0.3	13,411	8.5	▼0.6
Left	Jürgen Jojade	5,177	3.3	▲2.5	6,617	4.3	▲3.3
NPD	Wolf-Jürgen Zeuner	2,541	1.6		1,961	1.3	▲1.0
Christian Centre	Werner Kruck	1,857	1.2				
REP					1,773	1.1	▲0.2
Tierschutzpartei					1,457	0.9	▲0.2
GRAUEN					720	0.5	▲0.2
SGP					222	0.1	
BüSo					126	0.1	0.0
MLPD					65	0.0	
Informal votes		2,948			2,869		
Total valid votes		155,146			155,225		
Turnout		158,094	79.4	▼1.5			
CDU gain from SPD	Majority	3,998	2.6				
