= Tebroke =

Tebroke is a surname. Notable people with the surname include:

- Gerard Tebroke (1949–1995), Dutch runner
- Hermann-Josef Tebroke (born 1964), German politician
