= Guy Rossi =

French triathlete

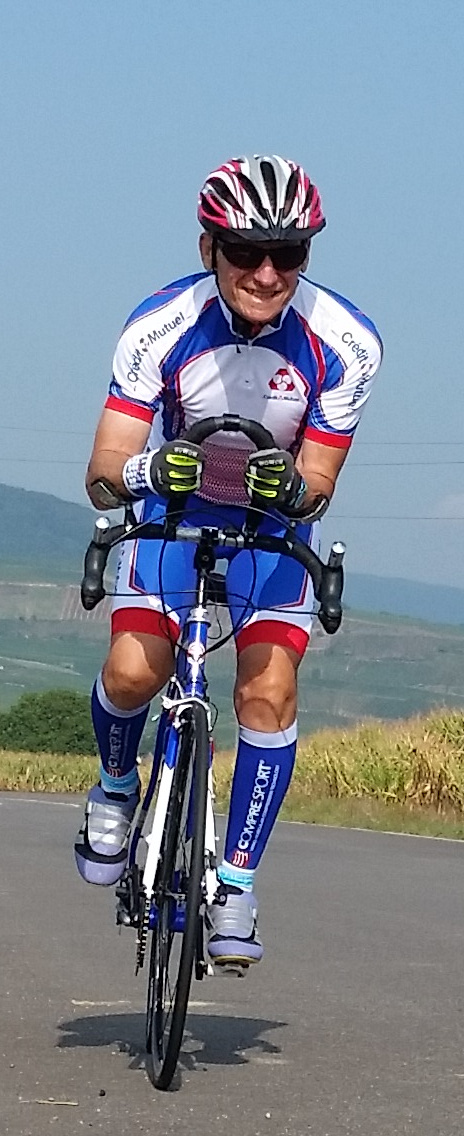
- Born: April 1948 (age 78); Marseille
- Website: guyrossi.fr

Guy Rossi, born April 1948 in Marseille, is a French ultra-triathlete and 1998 world champion in the deca-triathlon. He was still active as of 2018.

== Biography ==
=== Early life ===
Guy Rossi started playing volleyball in Marseille at the age of 10. He carried the Olympic flame during its journey before the Grenoble Winter Olympics in 1968.

=== Ultra-Triathlon Practice ===
==== Competitions ====
Guy Rossi participated in his first triathlon in 1985, at the age of 37, after receiving an advertisement for an event in Geneva. Because of the large number of participants in the race, which caused jostling, he soon turned to the ultra-triathlon, which he described as "freer and more convivial". He took part in the first edition of the World Endurance Challenge, a triple ultra-triathlon, which is three times the distance of an Ironman triathlon (11.4 km of swimming, 540 km of cycling, and 126.6 km of running) organized in Fontanil-Cornillon in 1988.

He was crowned world champion in the deca-triathlon in 1998. He finished first in the IUTA (International Ultra Triathlon Association) World Cup in 1993, 1997, and 1999. He finished fourth in the 2002 world championship but first in the 50-60 age category (veterans 2).

In 2005, Guy Rossi won the bronze medal in the world championship over the Double ultra-triathlon distance (7.6 km of swimming, 360 km of cycling, and 84.4 km of running), behind his compatriot Christophe Llamas, after 30 hours and 40 minutes of racing. His performance was divided into 2 hours 37 minutes 56 seconds of swimming, 14 hours 8 minutes 7 seconds of cycling, and 13 hours 32 minutes 30 seconds of running.

In 2011, he ended his season with the Double Anvil in the United States, completed in 32 hours 54 minutes, which allowed him to finish ninth in the global ranking and first in the over-60 category. In 2015, at 67 years old, he completed 67 double-ultra triathlons, the last one in Florida, in 33 hours 34 minutes, which placed him seventeenth in the event and first in the over-60 category.

Guy Rossi has also been the mentor of ultra-triathlete Dominique Leplant, who finished second in the 2011 World Cup.

He holds several longevity records, earning him the nickname "The Legend" :

- The only athlete to have completed 114 ultra-triathlon competitions;
- The only athlete to have finished 11 deca-triathlons, which is 110 times the distance of an Ironman triathlon in just 11 competitions (plus 5 quintuple-ultratriathlons, 1 quadruple-ultra-triathlon, 27 triple-ultra-triathlons, and 70 double-ultra-triathlons, as of March 9, 2018),
- The only pioneer of ultra-triathlon still active in 2018, he completed his last ultra-triathlon that same year in the United States.

==== Preparation and Training ====
From 30 to 35 hours of running per week at the beginning, Guy Rossi gradually reduced his training to about 18 hours per week in 2011. Running is the discipline he works on the most because it is "the hardest." Swimming is less emphasized; he considers it a part to be done without expending too much energy to save himself for the rest. Managing rest periods is crucial for him. He prefers to sleep by the roadside because "it's too hard to start again when you're comfortably in bed and warm," which doesn't make you want to resume running. He completed five ultra-triathlons in the same season for several years, thanks to regular monitoring of his heart rate and a training plan excluding interval training. In 2008, he had the Quebecer Marie-Josée Saint-Onge as his trainer. In 2024, a book was published about his preparation method and his results in competitions

=== Private Life ===
Guy Rossi is a retired physical education teacher. He has a wife, Annie.

He has been one of the 31 ambassadors of the city of Colmar since 2015 as a sports ambassador for the city.

== Achievements ==
=== Prize list ===
- Ultra-triathlon World Cup:
  - (silver) 2nd in 1990
  - (gold) 1st in 1993
  - (gold) 1st in 1997
  - (bronze) 3rd in 1998
  - (gold) 1st in 1999
  - (bronze) 3rd in 2003
  - (bronze) 3rd in 2005
  - 9th in 2011 - (gold) 1st in veteran 3 (over 60 years)
- Decatriathlon World Championship :
  - 4th n 1992
  - (silver) 2nd n 1997
  - (gold) World champion in 1998
  - 4th in 2002 - (gold) 1st in veteran 2 (50–60 years)
- Double ultra-triathlon World Championship :
  - (bronze) 3rd inn 2005
- Multiple times world champion veteran.
- Multiple times world record holder veteran.
- 18 international podiums.

=== Records ===
Épreuve	Performance
10 km	35' 26"
Semi-marathon	1h 23'
Marathon	2h 55'
Ironman	10h 29'
Double Ultra-triathlon	23h 17'
Triple Ultra-triathlon	40h 30'
Quintuple Ultra-triathlon	90h 57'
Decatriathlon (36 km swimming, 1800 km cycling, and 422 km running)	9 days 16 hours (WR)

== See also ==
- Triathlon
- Ironman
- Ultra-triathlon
