= Veronika Moos-Brochhagen =

German textile artist

Veronika Moos is a German textile artist. She was born in Bensberg, Germany and lives and works in Cologne, Germany, and Audinghen, France. Moos-Brochhagen studied art at the Academy of Art in Mainz, Germany (class Prof. E. Knoche-Wendel), philosophy and German, also at the University of Mainz, Germany. In 2007, she did her dissertation/PhD ("Transparenz der Verhüllung - die Unschärfe der Wahrheit. Eine Studie zur Sinnlichkeit von textilem Material in der Kunst am Beispiel alter und neuer Hungertücher“) at the University of Cologne, Germany. Moos-Brochhagen works with or without textile materials. Often she uses a special kind of Shibori-technique. In each case her works are "textile" (The word textile is from Latin texere which means "to weave", "to braid", "to construct" or "to connect").

== Exhibitions ==
=== Solo exhibitions (selection) ===
- 1990 Gallery Smend, Cologne, Germany
- 1997 Maternushaus, Cologne, Germany
- 2003 Gallery Stracke, Cologne, Germany
- 2003 Gallery Unik:te, Pesch, Germany
- 2004 Liverpool Biennale Liverpool, England
- 2005 St. Maria im Kapitol, Cologne, Germany
- 2005 Metropolitan Cathedral, Liverpool, England
- 2007 Gallery Contrast, Tilburg, Netherlands
- 2009 Textilmuseum "Die Scheune", Nettetal, Germany
- 2009 "Fadensonnen" - Textile Zeichnungen und Objekte, Haslach, Austria
- 2014 "Au Bord De La Mer", Côte de Lumiére, Salle Marcel Baudoin, Saint-Gilles-Croix-de-Vie, France

=== Participations (selection) ===
- 2000 "Made in Koeln", Gallery The View I, Liverpool, England
- 2001 "Tu was Du willst", Museum Baden, Solingen, Schloss Hardenberg-Museum, Velbert, Germany
- 2002 "Tactile Dimensions", London, Dublin, Harrogate, Great Britain, Ireland
- 2002 "made in Cologne – found in Liverpool", Gallery The View II, Liverpool, England
- 2002 "made in Cologne – found in Liverpool", Historical City Hall, Cologne, Germany
- 2002 "Frau vor Ort". Trinitatiskirche, Cologne, Germany
- 2002 Gallery Smend, Cologne, Germany
- 2003 "Iceland´s Connections", Reykjavìk, Korpúlfsstaðuir u. Hofn Hornafjordur, Iceland
- 2004 "Garantiert gebrauchsfrei", Niederrheinisches Museum, Kevelaer, Germany
- 2004 "About accidental lines and redness spots", Hope Gallery, Liverpool, England
- 2005 "Stille", Kloster Knechtsteden, Knechtsteden, Germany
- 2005 "FormART 2005" Klaus Oschmann Preis, Stuttgart, Germany
- 2005 "Textile Catalysts: Shibori shaping the 21st century" Tama Art Museum, Tokyo, Japan
- 2006 "A… wie Altenberg", Kreishaus, Bergisch Gladbach, Germany
- 2007 "100 Jahre Herding: Kunst – Visionen - Geschichte", Westfälisches Industriemuseum – Textilmuseum, Bocholt, Germany
- 2008 "Fadenspiel und Sticheleien", Museum der Stadt, Bad Neuenahr-Ahrweiler, Germany
- 2008 "Papier und Textil", Walkmühle, Wiesbaden, Germany
- 2008 "Shibori, teintures à réserves", Galerie: La Soie Disante, Paris, France
- 2008 "Shibori, hier et ajourd´hui (Shibori, yesterday and today)", Mairie du 5 Arrondissement (City Hall), Paris, France
- 2009 "Textil als Material & Metapher, 6 Positionen", International Exhibition (Curator, Conception), Bergisch Gladbach, Germany
- 2009 "GEDOK FormART 2009, Klaus Oschmann Preis"; Hannover, Germany
- 2009/2010 "Le tissu dans tous ses sens", 2nd Biennale of Contemporary Art 2009/2nde biennale de créations textiles contemporaines, Musée des Tissus de Lyon, France
- 2010 "Skulpturale Arbeiten in Textil und Metall", Museum Edenkoben, Edenkoben, Germany
- 2011 "GesichtZeigen", Special Exhibition of "GEDOK" Cologne, Käthe-Kollwitz-Museum, Cologne, Germany
- 2012 "Two of us", Quartier am Hafen, Cologne, Germany

== Art projects and collaborations ==
- "Belonging and Beyond", Collaboration with Lin Holland, Liverpool, England
- Art project "TX 5", Cologne
- Artproject "Made in Koeln", Cologne
- Artproject "eight-days-a-week", Cologne/Liverpool

== Publications (selection) ==
- GEDOK KÖLN e. V., Hannelore Fischer (Hrg.): „GesichtZeigen“ - Positionen zeitgenössischer Künstlerinnen zum Portrait, Käthe-Kollwitz-Museum, Cologne, Germany 2011
- Moos-Brochhagen, Veronika: Das 7. Internationale Shibori-Symposium in Frankreich/ 7th International Shibori Symposium in France, Textilforum 1/2009, S. 14 -15
- Knoche-Wendel, Elfriede: „Papier/Textil 1987 – 2008“. Dokumentation der Examens- und Diplomarbeiten der letzten 21 Jahre, Klasse Knoche-Wendel. Mainz, Germany, 2008
- Moos-Brochhagen, Veronika (2008). Die Unschärfe der Wahrheit. Transparenz der Verhüllung. Eine Studie zur Sinnlichkeit von textilem Material in der Kunst am Beispiel alter und neuer Hungertücher. PhD thesis, University of Cologne, Germany
- Moos-Brochhagen, Veronika: Das 6. Internationale Shibori-Symposium in Tokio/ 6th International Shibori Symposium, Tokyo. Textilforum 3/2005, S. 32-33”
- Moos-Brochhagen, Veronika, Holland, Lin: „Collaboration“, Liverpool Hope University, ISBN 1-898749-20-5, Cologne, Germany/ Liverpool, England 2003
- Moos-Brochhagen, Veronika: “4. Internationales Shibori-Symposium in Europa/4th International Shibori Symposium in Europe”, Textilforum 1/2003 March, S. 8/9
- Moos-Brochhagen, Veronika: “Konzepte Textiler Kunst“, Textil & Unterricht 4/2003, Kallmeyerische Verlagsbuchhandlung, S. 14-17
- Pohl, Walfried, Moos-Brochhagen, Veronika,"Textile Materialkunst von Veronika Moos-Brochhagen", in: Textilkunst, Bd. 27 (1999), S. 176 - 179 : Ill.
- Moos-Brochhagen, Veronika: “Textilkunst: Ein- und Aussichten” in 25 Jahre Galerie Smend, 25 Jahre Textile Kunst. Verlag der Galerie Smend, Cologne, Germany 1998, S. 130-31
