= Astrid Benöhr =

German triathlete

Astrid Benöhr (born 8 October 1957, in Bergisch Gladbach) is a German endurance athlete in Ultra-Triathlon. She holds the women's world record in the quadruple ironman. She has also won women's world championships in the double, quintuple and deca ironman in Ultra-Triathlon (also known as multiple Ironman disciplines), and held several other ultra-triathlon world records previously.

Benöhr began to run in her twenties, to aid her efforts to stop smoking. She started collecting ironman titles in 1987, working without a coach to this day. She is a housewife and has three children, born in 1980, 1981 and 1985. In an interview in 2003, she said that sex the night before a competition helps, as it relaxes and leads to deeper sleep.

Benöhr claims to have reached a better time than the men's world record in Decatriathlon, in an own race against the watch but this can't be verified. Her world records for females in triple, quadruple and quintuple triathlon are 6, 5.5 and 13.5 hours slower than the men's world records. In the 1998 deca ironman race in Monterrey, Mexico, Astrid Benöhr was disqualified for taking significant shortcuts during the running segment.
