= Nicolaus-Cusanus-Gymnasium Bergisch Gladbach =

Coordinates: 50°59′50.11″N 7°7′19.17″E

Nicolaus-Cusanus-Gymnasium

Location
- Reuterstraße 51; 51465 Bergisch Gladbach; North Rhine-Westphalia; Germany

Information
- School type: Public High School
- Founded: 1888
- Headmaster: Inge Mertens-Billmann
- Grades: 5-13 (Abitur)
- Enrollment: 1057
- Language: German, English, Latin, French
- Website: http://www.ncg-online.de/

The Nicolaus-Cusanus-Gymnasium (NCG) is a public high school in the German city Bergisch Gladbach. The school is named after the German church law academic, philosopher, bishop and cardinal Nicholas of Cusa.

In 1888 the private ‘Knabenschule’ (boys' high school) was established which later became the Nicolaus-Cusanus-Gymnasium. In 1958 the school moved to its new location on Reuterstraße near the city centre.

The NCG belongs to the largest schools in Bergisch Gladbach counting the number of teachers and pupils.

== School Partnerships ==
| Country | School Name | since | Comments |
|---|---|---|---|
| Australia | Billanook College in Mooroolbark (Melbourne) | 2002 | First visit from Australia: 2002. Last visit from Australia 21 September to 27 September 2010. First stay in Australia: 3 April 2006 to 21 April 2006. Last stay in Australia: 9 March 2008 to 27 March 2008 |
| France | Collège Sainte Famille in Béthune | 2001 | First visit from France: April 2001. Last visit from France: 5 October 2011 to 10 October 2011. First stay in France: 31 March 2001 to 3 April 2001. Last stay in France: 16 March 2011 to 21 March 2011. |
| France | Collège Sainte Ide in Lens | 2002 | First visit from France: 2002. Last visit from France: 5 October 2011 to 10 October 2011. First stay in France: 2002. Last stay in France: 16 March 2011 to 21 March 2011. |
| United Kingdom | James Allen's Girls School in London | | Last visit from United Kingdom: 7 April 2011 to 13 April 2011. Last stay in United Kingdom: 18 June 2011 to 24 June 2011. |
| United Kingdom | Therfield School in Leatherhead | | |
| USA | Ben Davis High School in Indianapolis | 2004 | First stay in the United States: 14 October 2004 to 11 November 2004. First visit from the United States: 9 June 2005 to 2 July 2005 |

== School Sponsorship ==
| Country | School Name | since | Comments |
|---|---|---|---|
| Maldives | Haa Alif Atoll Vashafaru School | 2004 | Adoption of the sponsorship after the 2004 tsunami disaster |

== Miscellaneous ==
Pupils publish the school newspaper "Impuls".
