= Götz Heidelberg =

German constructing engineer and entrepreneur

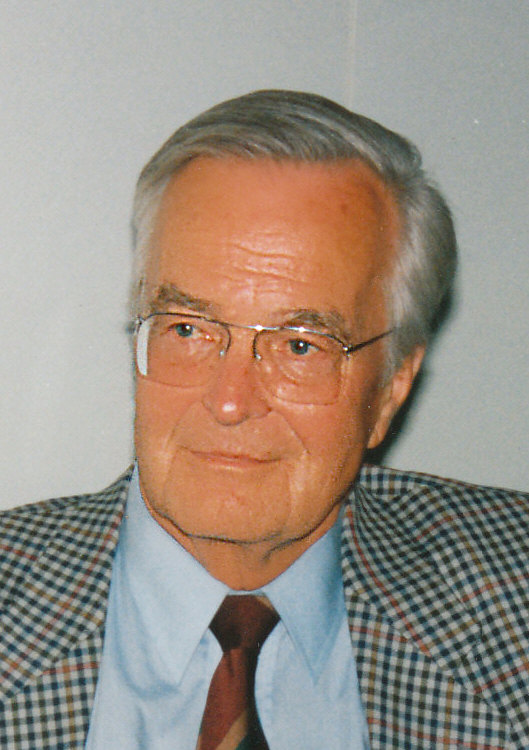
Götz Heidelberg

Götz Heidelberg (1 March 1923 in Bergisch Gladbach-Bensberg near Cologne – 22 April 2017) was a German constructing engineer and entrepreneur known for the development of Maglev magnetic transportation systems.

He implemented the first functional magnetic vehicle at 1:1 scale at a 600-meter long test track in Ottobrunn. The 7-meter-long vehicle, weighing 6 tons, is now at the Deutsches Museum.
