= Harald Weyel =

German politician

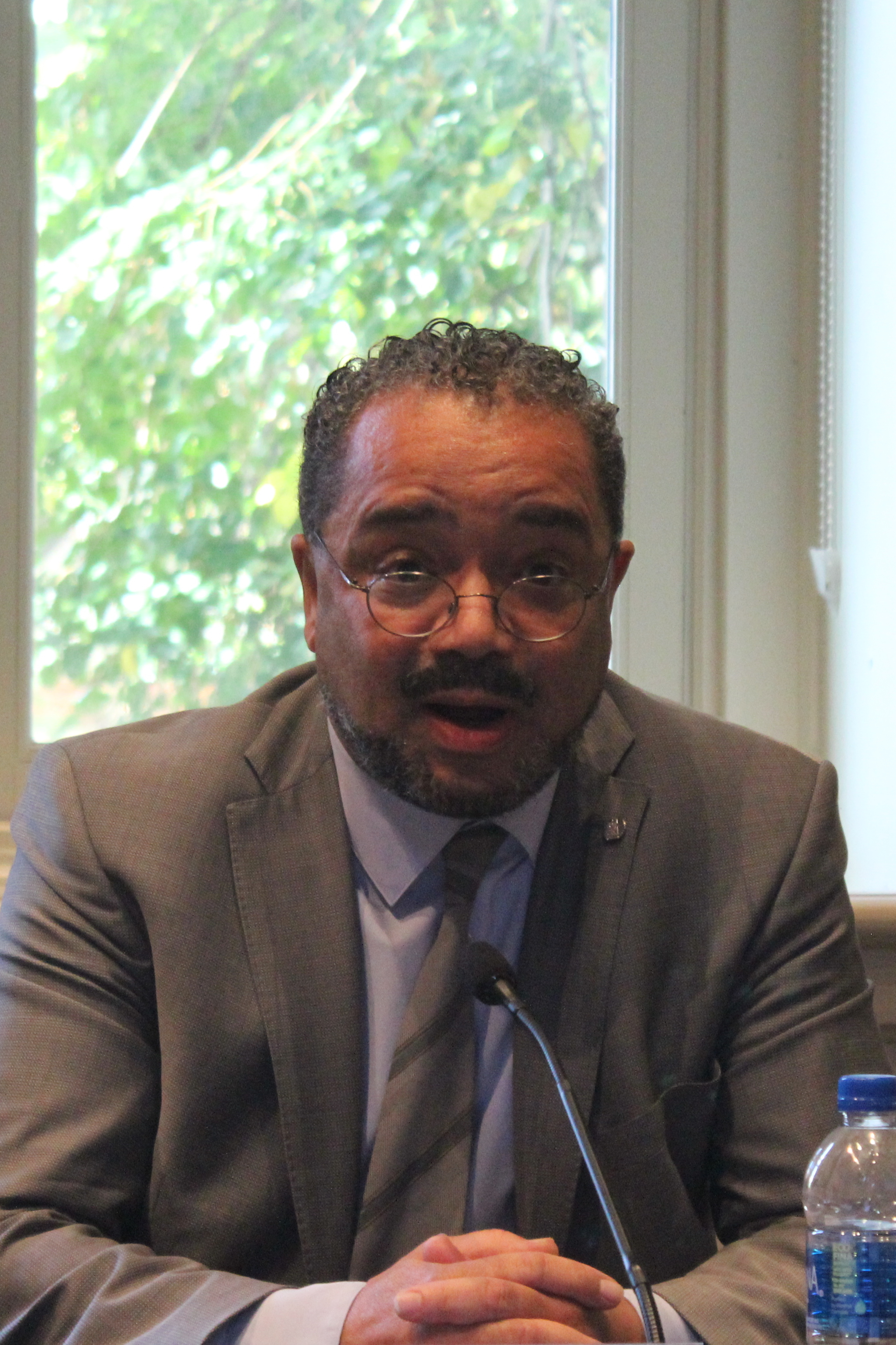
- Weyel in 2022

Member of the Bundestag
- In office 24 September 2017 – 25 March 2025

Personal details
- Born: 30 August 1959 (age 67) Herborn, West Germany (now Germany)
- Party: AfD (2013–present)
- Other political affiliations: Free Voters (2009–2013)
- Children: 1
- Education: University of Oldenburg; University of Cologne

Harald Weyel (born 30 August 1959) is a German politician. Born in Herborn, Hesse, he represents Alternative for Germany. Harald Weyel has served as a member of the Bundestag from the state of North Rhine-Westphalia from 2017 to 2025.

== Early life ==
Weyel is the son of an African-American soldier and a cook from the Westerwald. One year after his birth, his father left the family and returned to Raleigh, North Carolina.

== Political career ==
He became member of the Bundestag after the 2017 German federal election. He is a member of the Committee on European Union Affairs. He voted against a resolution in the parliamentary assembly of the Council of Europe which determined that forced detention and deportation of children from Russian occupied territories of Ukraine is "genocide", the sole parliamentarian to do so.
