= Wolfgang Bosbach =

German politician (born 1952)

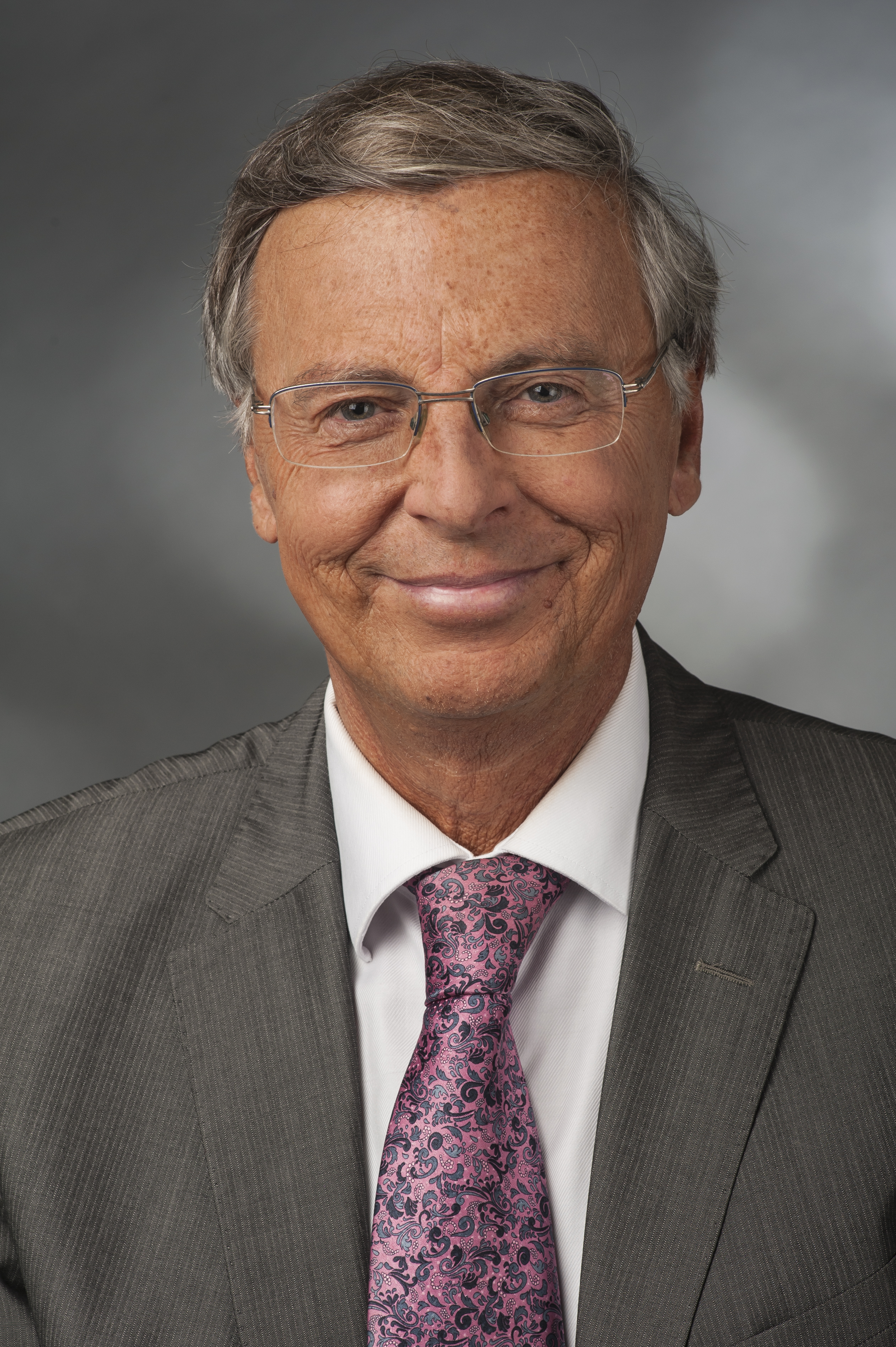
- Bosbach in 2012

Member of the Bundestag
- In office 1994–2017

Personal details
- Born: 11 June 1952 (age 74) Bergisch Gladbach, West Germany
- Party: Christian Democratic Union
- Children: 3, including Caroline
- Education: University of Cologne
- Profession: Lawyer
- Website: wobo.de

Wolfgang Walter Wilhelm Bosbach (born 11 June 1952) is a German politician and member of the Christian Democratic Union (CDU), which he joined in 1972. A lawyer by profession, Bosbach is working at the law firm Winter Rechtsanwälte in Bergisch Gladbach.

== Political career ==
Bosbach was a directly elected member of the Bundestag from 1994 until 2017, representing Rheinisch-Bergischer Kreis, and the deputy parliamentary group leader of his party from 2000 until 2009. From 1994 until 2002 and from 2009 until 2017, he served on the Committee on Internal Affairs.

Following the 2013 federal elections, Bosbach was part of the CDU/CSU team in the negotiations with the SPD on a coalition agreement.

In August 2016 Bosbach announced that he would not stand in the 2017 federal elections but instead resign from active politics by the end of the parliamentary term due to his deteriorating health. That same month, he agreed to serve as columnist for German tabloid Bild from 2017 on.

== Career after politics ==
In 2017, Minister-President Armin Laschet of North Rhine-Westphalia appointed Bosbach as chair of a commission to advise the state government on criminal justice reforms.

Ahead of the 2021 Rhineland-Palatinate state election, CDU candidate Christian Baldauf included Bosbach in his shadow cabinet for the party's campaign to unseat incumbent Malu Dreyer as Minister-President of Rhineland-Palatinate.

== Political positions ==
=== European integration ===
In August 2011, Bosbach became the first senior CDU MP to say he would not vote for legal changes to allow the European Financial Stability Facility to buy sovereign bonds on the market. He later criticized the permanent rescue mechanism – called European Stability Mechanism – was a step toward a European transfer union. In 2012, he told German business magazine Wirtschaftswoche that Greece should leave the euro region to overhaul its economy.

On 27 February 2015 Bosbach voted against the Merkel government's proposal for a four-month extension of Greece's bailout; in doing so, he joined a record number of 29 dissenters from the CDU/CSU parliamentary group who expressed skepticism about whether the Greek government under Prime Minister Alexis Tsipras could be trusted to deliver on its reform pledges. On 17 July he voted against the government's proposal to negotiate a third bailout for Greece; in response to the resulting discussions with fellow conservative MPs, he resigned from his office as Chairman of the Committee on Internal Affairs.

=== Domestic politics ===
In 2013, Bosbach rejected calls to grant Muslims living in Germany two days of official holiday a year to mark important religious festivals, saying there was "no Islamic tradition in Germany" and that religious holidays here reflected the country's Christian heritage.

== Other activities ==
=== Corporate boards ===
- 1. FC Köln, Member of the Advisory Board
- Deutsche Telekom, Member of the Data Privacy Advisory Board
- Signal Iduna Allgemeine Versicherung, Member of the Supervisory Board
- Securitas Deutschland, Member of the Supervisory Board (1998–2002)

=== Non-profit organizations ===
- Gegen Vergessen – Für Demokratie, Member
- Rotary International, Member
- ZDF, Member of the Television Board
- 1. FC Köln, Member of the Advisory Board (-2019)
- Foundation "Remembrance, Responsibility and Future", Member of the Board of Trustees (2000–2006)
- Ursula Lübbe Foundation, Member of the Board of Trustees (2005–2009)

== Recognition ==
- 2013 – "Goldenes Steuerrad" (golden steering wheel) of the Großen Mülheimer Karnevals-Gesellschaft von 1903
- 2014 – Honorary senator of the Düsseldorfer Karnevalsgesellschaft Weissfräcke
