= Ultra-triathlon =

Very-long-distance triathlon

An ultra-triathlon covers more distance than an ITU 'long course,' or Ironman triathlon. The term generally refers to all triathlon events with a distance that is a multiple of the Ironman Triathlon, which consists of 2.4 miles (3.86 km) of swimming, 112 miles (180.25 km) of cycling, and a full marathon (26.2 mi or 42.2 km) of running. The most common distances are the double, triple, quadruple, quintuple and deca triathlon. Unlike a standard triathlon event, an ultra-triathlon event may not necessarily involve the three component disciplines of triathlon (swimming, cycling and running) in direct consecutive order, but may instead consist of multiple consecutive individual triathlons performed on consecutive days, or may involve disciplines out of the usual order, such as the Enduroman that goes run-swim-bike to allow crossing of the English Channel.

The first ultra-distance race was held as a double in Huntsville, Alabama, United States in 1985, and since then the distances have been expanding. While 20x and even 30x events have been held, the DECA, or 10x event, either in the 'continuous' version (swim-bike-run), or in the 'one-per-day' version is typically the longest distance that can be found on the race calendar every year. In 2020 and 2022, the swissultra DECA continuous was the IUTA World Championship over that distance.

The IUTA (International Ultra Triathlon Association) is the official governing body of Ultra Triathlon.

== Standard distances ==
Distances	Swimming	Cycling	Running
Single Ultratriathlon	3.86 km (2.40 mi)	180.25 km (112 mi)	42.2 km (26.2 mi)
Double Ultratriathlon	7.6 km (4.7 mi)	360 km (220 mi)	84.4 km (52.4 mi)
Triple Ultratriathlon	11.4 km (7.1 mi)	540 km (340 mi)	126.6 km (78.7 mi)
Quadruple Ultratriathlon	15.2 km (9.4 mi)	720 km (450 mi)	168.8 km (104.9 mi)
Quintuple Ultratriathlon	19 km (12 mi)	900 km (560 mi)	211 km (131 mi)
Deca Ultratriathlon	38 km (24 mi)	1,800 km (1,100 mi)	422 km (262 mi)
Deca One-Per-Day (10 days)	every day 3.8 km	every day 180 km	every day 42 km
Ultraman 3 days	Day 1 - 10km (6.25mi)	Day 1 - 145km (90mi), Day 2 - 276.1km (172.5 mi)	Day 3 - 84.3km (52.7 mi)
Ultra 355 3 days	Day 1 - 5km (3.1mi)	Day 1 - 120km (75 mi), Day 2 - 180km (112 mi)	Day 3 - 50km (31.25 mi)
Double Deca Ultratriathlon	76 km (47 mi)	3,600 km (2,200 mi)	844 km (524 mi)
Triple Deca Ultratriathlon	114 km (71 mi)	5,400 km (3,400 mi)	1,260 km (780 mi)

== World records ==
=== Men ===
Distance	Athlete	Time	Place
Single	(Norway) Kristian Blummenfelt	7 h 21 m 12 s	2021 Cozumel
Double	(Denmark) Christoffer Heick	17 h 51 m 17 s	2026 Vinni, Estonia - Result
3x	(Poland) Robert Karaś	30 h 48 m 57 s	2018 Lensahn
4x	(Denmark) Søren Højbjerre	53 h 41 m 00 s	1993 Szekesfehervar
5x	(Poland) Adrian Kostera	67 h 45 m 51 s	2022 Colmar
5x Day	(Estonia) Rait Ratasepp	49 h 32 m 49 s	2022 Buchs
10x	(Poland) Jurand Czabański	169 h 53 m 33 s	2025 Búzios
10x Day	(Estonia) Rait Ratasepp	99 h 49 m 47 s	2024 Vinni
20x	(Lithuania) Vidmantas Urbonas	437 h 21 m 40 s	1998 Monterrey
20x Day	(Austria) Norbert Lüftenegger	241 h 36 m 45 s	2019 Buchs
30x	(Germany) Dirk Leonhardt	959 h 03 m 00 s	2020 Bruchköbel
30x Day	(Hungary) Jozsef Rokob	356 h 33 m 17 s	2013 Lonato del Garda
Ultraman	(New Zealand) Simon Cochrane	19 h 48 m 47 s	2023 Noosa Heads

=== Women ===
Distance	Athlete	Time	Place
Single	(Germany) Anne Haug	8 h 02 m 38 s	2024 Roth
Double	(Poland) Sabina Bartecka	22 h 55 m 19 s	2024 Bad Radkersburg
3x	(Poland) Alicja Pyszka-Bazan	36 h 13 m 55 s	2024 Lensahn
4x	(Germany) Astrid Benöhr	59 h 15 m 00 s	1993 Szekesfehervar
5x	(Austria) Alexandra Meixner	84 h 44 m 29 s	2018 Buchs
5x Day	(Switzerland) Eva Hürlimann	66 h 52 m 22 s	2018 Buchs
10x	(New Zealand) Christine Couldrey	247 h 07 m 21 s	2018 New Orleans
10x Day	(Austria) Alexandra Meixner	137 h 23 m 43 s	2022 Buchs
20x	(Lithuania) Alina Ranceva	554 h 07 m 15 s	2026 Peschiera del Garda
20x Day	(Austria) Alexandra Meixner	279 h 37 min 48 s	2016 Buchs
