= Maik Außendorf =

German politician (born 1971)

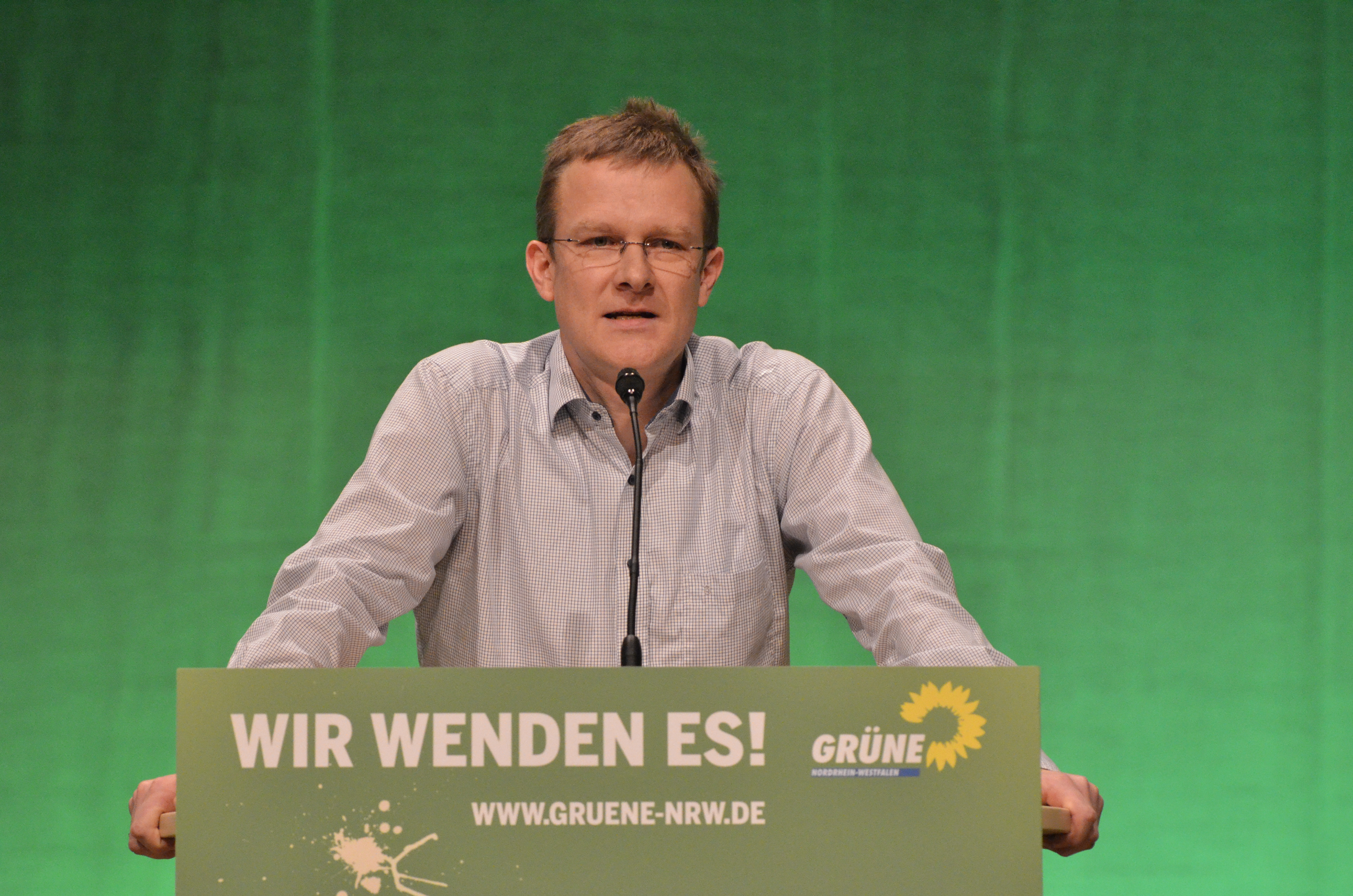

Member of the Bundestag
- Incumbent
- Assumed office 26 October 2021

Personal details
- Born: 17 August 1971 (age 54) Münster
- Party: Alliance 90/The Greens

Maik Außendorf (born 17 August 1971) is a German politician of the Alliance 90/The Greens who has been serving as a member of the Bundestag from the state of North Rhine-Westphalia since the 2021 German federal election.

== Early life and career ==
Außendorf has a background in mathematics and computer technology. He was a co-founder and managing director of multiple IT firms with a focus on open-source software. Upon his election into the Bundestag, he sold his shares in the companies and resigned from his positions as managing director.

== Political career ==
In parliament, Außendorf has since been a member of the Committee on Economic Affairs and the Committee on Digital Affairs. He laid an emphasis on digital sovereignty and the use of open-source technology in public administration.

In the early federal elections of February 2025, Außendorf narrowly missed out on a seat in the 21st Bundestag.

== Other activities ==
- Federal Network Agency for Electricity, Gas, Telecommunications, Post and Railway (BNetzA), Member of the Advisory Board (since 2022)
- German Cyclist's Association (ADFC), Member
- German Federation for the Environment and Nature Conservation (BUND), Member
