= Flehbach =

River in Germany

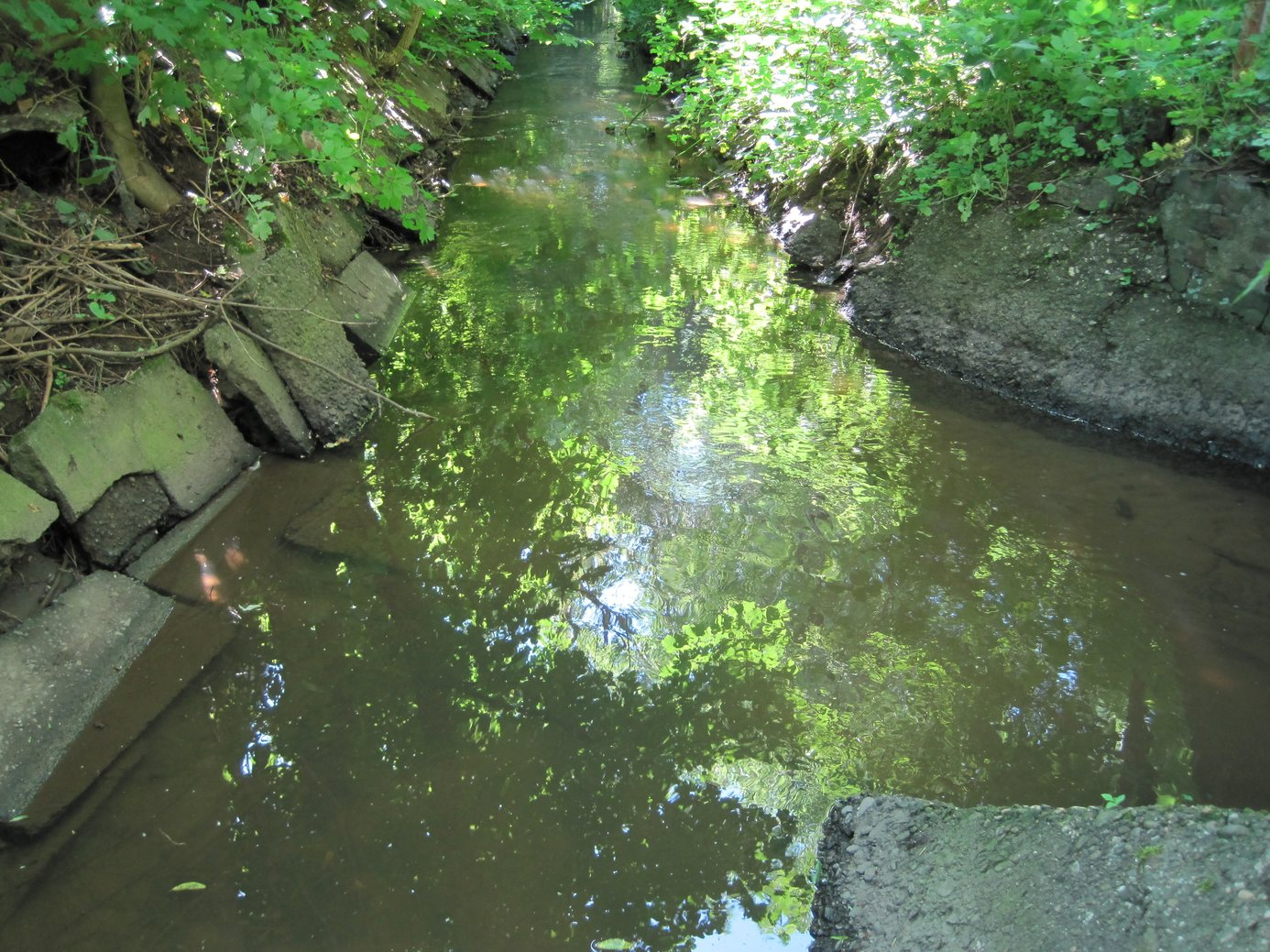
- Confluence of Flehbach (front), Frankenforster Bach (right) and continuation as Faulbach (back)

Location
- Country: Germany
- State: North Rhine-Westphalia

Physical characteristics
- Mouth
  - location: Rhine
  - coordinates: 50.9687°N 7.0008°E
- Length: 16.9 km (10.5 mi)

Basin features
- Progression: Rhine→ North Sea

Flehbach (in its lower course: Faulbach) is a river of North Rhine-Westphalia, Germany. It flows into the Rhine in Cologne-Mülheim.

== See also ==
- List of rivers of North Rhine-Westphalia
