= Markus Feldenkirchen =

German journalist

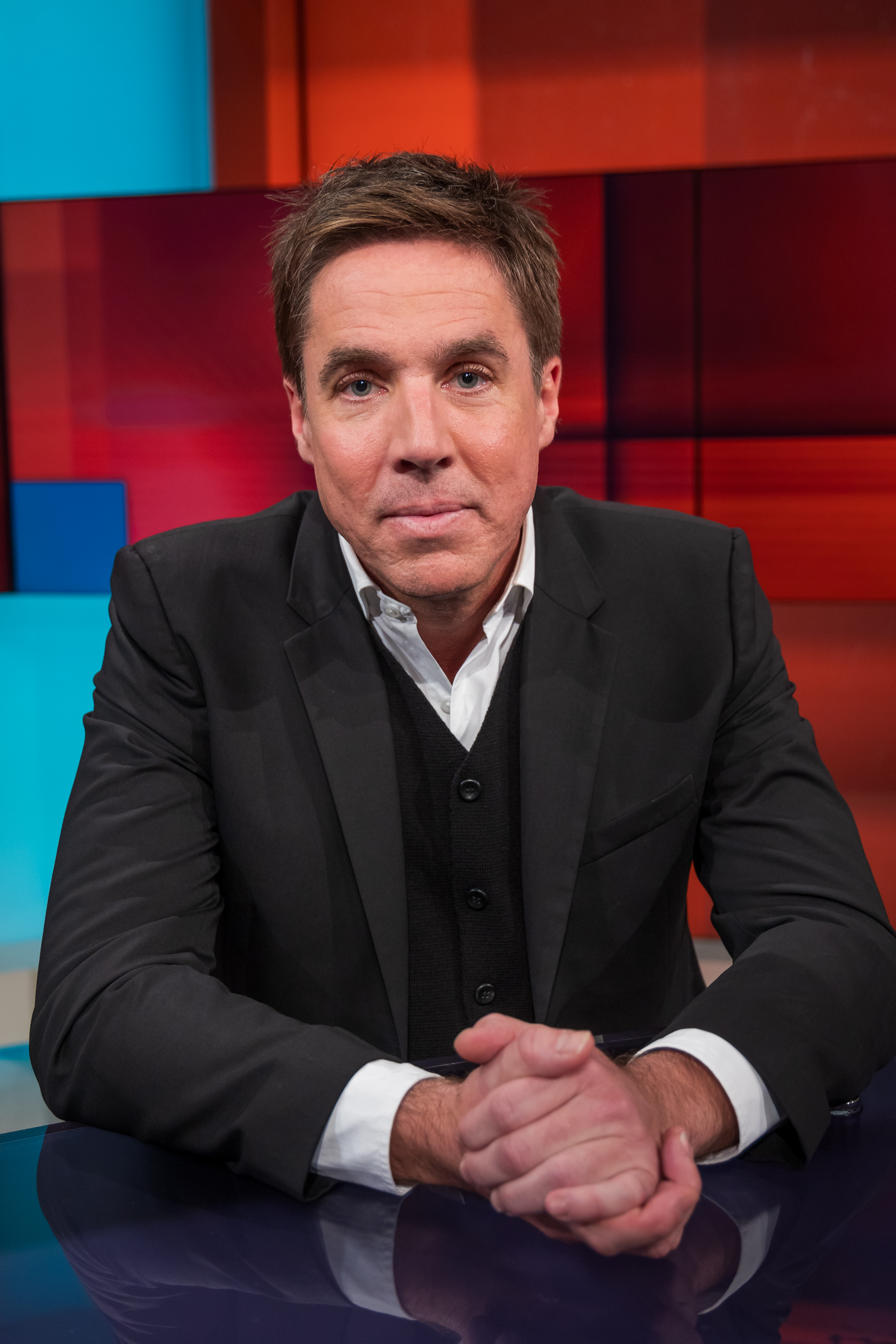
Feldenkirchen at hart aber fair in 2023

Markus Feldenkirchen (born 1 September 1975 in Bergisch Gladbach) is a German journalist and writer.

== Early life and education ==
Markus Feldenkirchen was educated at Albertus Magnus Grammar School in Bergisch Gladbach, where he took his Abitur examinations (A-level equivalent). Upon successful completion of his school-leaving qualifications, Feldenkirchen read Political Science, History and Literature at the University of Bonn and at New York University in the United States. He then studied at Deutsche Journalistenschule in Munich, from which he graduated in 2001.

== Career ==
From 2001 to 2004, Feldenkirchen worked as a lobby correspondent for Der Tagesspiegel newspaper in Berlin. In 2004, he transferred to the head office of the German Der Spiegel (magazine), where he first worked as an editor. He advanced to senior political reporter in 2006 and was subsequently appointed deputy editor in 2007. Since the summer of 2010, Feldenkirchen has held the position of columnist in the head office of Der Spiegel. In 2014, he finished a one-year stint as foreign correspondent in Washington, US.

Feldenkirchen produced his first 45-minute documentary on the life and career of Wolfgang Schäuble. The film, It is how it is, was premiered on German television in September 2012.

Feldenkirchen joined Martin Schulz to report on the five final months of the electoral campaign for the Bundestag (German Federal Parliament) in 2017. He attended fifty events, ranging from strategy meetings to social gatherings, including Currywurst Dinners (a social occasion in the evening, where bratwurst sausage is served). Der Spiegel published an exclusive about Schulz after the election results came in, as agreed with the politician beforehand. The portrayal of Barack Obama in The New Yorker served as a model for the feature story written by Feldenkirchen in November 2016.

== Novels ==
Kein & Aber, a publishing house in Zürich, released Feldenkirchen's debut novel What Belongs Together in 2010. The book tells the story of a successful banker, who receives a letter that reminds him of first love and thus makes him feel nostalgic. The novel was reviewed favourably and, following the warm reception from the critics, Feldenkirchen published his second book, No Experiments, in the summer of 2013. The novel portrays a conservative man who falls in love with an independent young woman and wavers in his moral values. This book was equally well received.

- Feldenkirchen, Markus (2010). Was zusammengehört Roman [What Belongs Together] (in German). Zürich: Kein & Aber. ISBN 978-3-0369-5575-9. OCLC 660149798.
- Feldenkirchen, Markus (2013). Keine Experimente Roman [No Experiments] (in German). Zürich: Kein & Aber. ISBN 978-3-0369-5671-8. OCLC 851697377.
