= Thomas Fetsch =

German politician (born 1969)

Member of the Bundestag
- Incumbent
- Assumed office 25 March 2025
- Constituency: Hesse

Personal details
- Born: 7 July 1969 (age 56)
- Party: Alternative for Germany

Thomas Norbert Fetsch (born 7 July 1969 in Mainz) is a German lawyer and politician who was elected as a member of the Bundestag in 2025. He is the spokesperson of the Alternative for Germany in Bergstraße.
