= Michael Meister =

German mathematician and politician (born 1961)

Michael Meister MdB
- Meister in 2014

Member of the Bundestag; from Hesse
- Incumbent
- Assumed office 10 November 1994
- Preceded by: Sissy Geiger
- Constituency: Bergstraße (1994–1998); State list (1998–2005); Bergstraße (2005–present)

Personal details
- Born: Michael Günther Meister; 9 June 1961 (age 65) Lorsch, West Germany
- Party: Christian Democratic Union
- Children: 2
- Education: TU Darmstadt

Michael Günther Meister (born 9 June 1961) is a German mathematician and politician of the Christian Democratic Union (CDU) who has been serving as a member of the Bundestag from the state Hesse since 1994.

In addition to his parliamentary work, Meister served as Parliamentary State Secretary at the Federal Ministry of Education and Research in the government of Chancellor Angela Merkel from 2018 to 2021 and as Minister of State for Federal-State Relations in the government of Chancellor Friedrich Merz from 2025 to 2026.

== Early life ==
Michael Günther Meister was born in 1961 in Lorsch.

== Political career ==
Meister first became a member of the Bundestag in the 1994 German federal election. From 1994 until 1998, he was a member of the Committee on Urban Development, Housing and Regional Planning. From 2004 until 2013, he served as deputy chairman of the CDU/CSU parliamentary group under the leadership of successive chairpersons Angela Merkel (2004-2005) and Volker Kauder (2005-2013). In this capacity, he oversaw the group's initiatives on economic policy.

In the negotiations to form a Grand Coalition of the Christian Democrats (CDU together with the Bavarian CSU) and the Social Democrats (SPD) following the 2013 federal elections, Meister was part of the CDU/CSU delegation in the working group on financial policies and the national budget, led by Wolfgang Schäuble and Olaf Scholz. In the third cabinet of Chancellor Angela Merkel, he served as Parliamentary State Secretary at the Federal Ministry of Finance under minister Wolfgang Schäuble from 2013 until 2018.

In the negotiations to form a coalition government under Merkel's leadership following the 2017 federal elections, Meister was part of the working group on urban development, led by Bernd Althusmann, Kurt Gribl and Natascha Kohnen.

In early 2023, German news media reported that Meister was the CDU's preferred candidate to succeed Johannes Beermann as member of the board of Deutsche Bundesbank.

As part of a cabinet reshuffle in 2026, Chancellor Friedrich Merz replaced Meister with Philipp Amthor.

== Other activities ==
=== Corporate boards ===
- KfW, Ex-Officio Member of the Board of Supervisory Directors (2007–2014)
- German Investment Corporation (DEG), Member of the Supervisory Board (2014–2018)

=== Non-profit organizations ===
- Senckenberg Nature Research Society, Member of the Board of Trustees
- German Federal Environmental Foundation (DBU), Member of the Board of Trustees (2019–2021)
- German Foundation for Peace Research (DSF), Member of the Board (2018–2022)
- Jewish Museum Berlin, Member of the Board of Trustees (2014–2018)

== Political positions ==
In June 2017, Meister voted against Germany's introduction of same-sex marriage.

Ahead of the Christian Democrats’ leadership election in 2022, Meister publicly endorsed Helge Braun to succeed Armin Laschet as the party’s chair.
