= Albertus Magnus Gymnasium =

Coordinates: 50°57′40″N 7°09′24″E

Information
- Former name: Bensberger-Progymnasium
- Established: 1858; 167 years ago

The Albertus-Magnus-Gymnasium (AMG) is a school in Bensberg, part of the city of Bergisch Gladbach in Germany. It provides secondary education in the German system from grade 5 to 12/13. It was founded in 1858 as the Bensberger-Progymnasium. Since 1958 it exists in current form providing nine years of education which has changed for new students since 2005 to eight years. The student body comprises between 900 and 1100 students with 70 to 90 teachers.

The school is named after Albertus Magnus, a religious scholar and philosopher.

The school offers different types of education:

- main education (German/English from grade 5 on)
- bilingual education (German/more English classes from grade 5 on and from grade 7 on History, Politics and Geography in English instead in German)
- "dual" education (German/English and French from grade 6 on)
