= Till Mansmann =

German politician (born 1968)

Member of the Bundestag
- In office 2017–2025

Personal details
- Born: 8 January 1968 (age 58) Mannheim, West Germany (now Germany)
- Party: FDP
- Children: 1

Till Mansmann (born 8 January 1968) is a German politician of the Free Democratic Party (FDP) who has been serving as a member of the Bundestag from the state of Hesse since 2017.

In addition to his parliamentary work, Mansmann served as Commissioner for Green Hydrogen in the Federal Ministry of Education and Research in the coalition government of Chancellor Olaf Scholz from 2022 to 2024.

== Early life and career ==
After graduating from high school in Denzlingen, Mansmann did his military service as a temporary soldier. From 1989 onwards, Mansmann studied physics with the subsidiary subjects of mathematics, chemistry and philosophy in Heidelberg and Frankfurt am Main and graduated in 1997 with a diploma. During his studies he worked as a journalist and completed internships in various editorial offices. From 1997 to 1999 Mansmann was editor and later head of department (print media and internet) at kress report.

== Political career ==
Mansmann has been a member of the FDP since 2005. He ran for the Free Democrats in the Bergstrasse constituency of the Bundestag in the 2017 elections and moved into the Bundestag via the 5th place on the state list of the FDP Hessen. From 2018 until 2020, Mansmann was a member of the Committee for Labour and Social Affairs and the Committee for Economic Cooperation and Development. In 2020, he moved to the Finance Committee.

In addition to his committee assignments, Mansmann was part of the German Parliamentary Friendship Group for Relations with the States of the Southern Caucasus.

In the 2021 German federal election, Mansmann contested the constituency of Mountain Road in Hessen State.

== Other activities ==
- German Institute for Development Evaluation (DEval), Member of the Advisory Board
- German Foundation for World Population (DSW), Member of the Parliamentary Advisory Board
