= Bergisch Gladbach =

- City
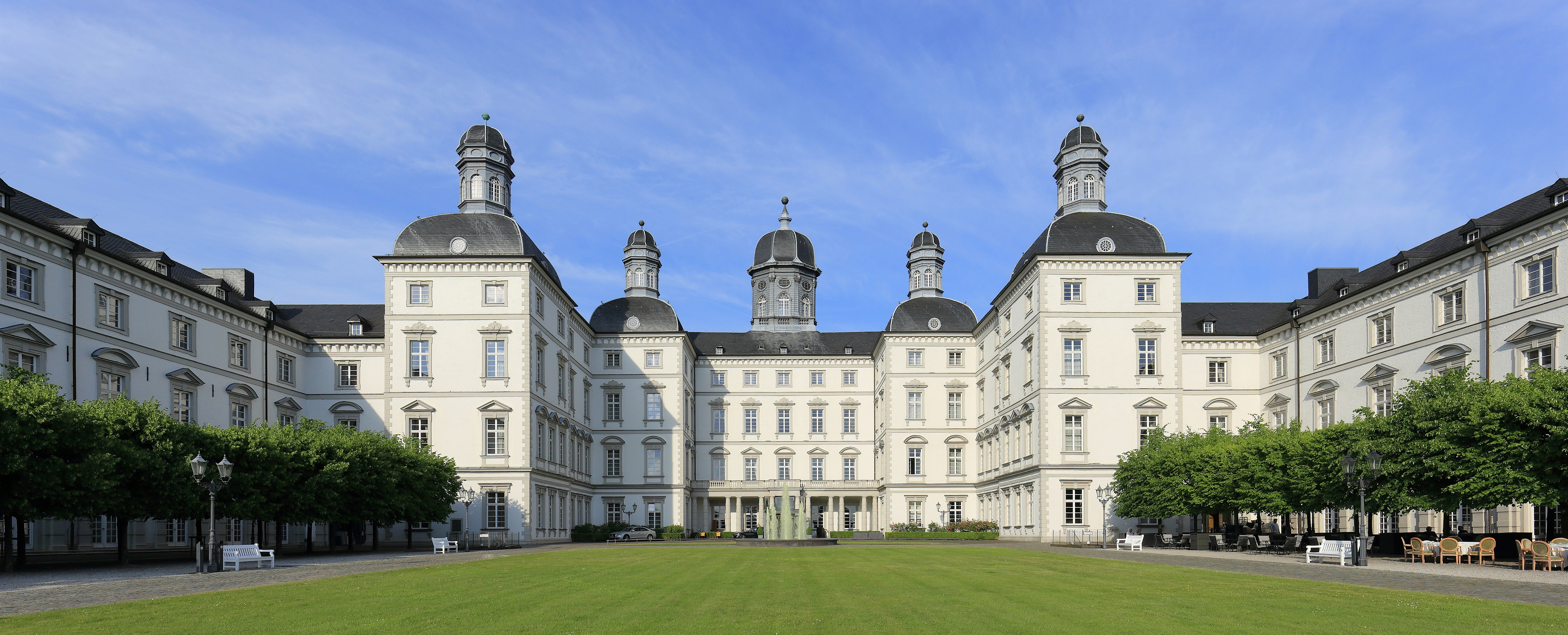
- Forecourt of Schloss Bensberg

- Flag Coat of arms

- Location of Bergisch Gladbach within Rheinisch-Bergischer Kreis district
- Interactive map of Bergisch Gladbach
- Location within Germany Location within North Rhine-Westphalia
- Coordinates: 50°59′30″N 7°07′49″E
- Country: Germany
- State: North Rhine-Westphalia
- Admin. region: Köln
- District: Rheinisch-Bergischer Kreis
- Subdivisions: 6

Government
  - Mayor (2025–30): Marcel Kreutz (SPD)

Area
  - Total: 83.09 km^{2} (32.08 sq mi)
- Elevation: 51–267 m (167–876 ft)

Population (2025-12-31)
  - Total: 111,174
  - Density: 1,338/km^{2} (3,465/sq mi)
- Time zone: UTC+01:00 (CET)
  - Summer (DST): UTC+02:00 (CEST)
- Postal codes: 51401-51469
- Dialling codes: 02202, 02204, 02207
- Vehicle registration: GL
- Website: www.bergischgladbach.de

Bergisch Gladbach (German: [ˌbɛʁɡɪʃ ˈɡlatbax]) is a city in the Cologne/Bonn Region of North Rhine-Westphalia, Germany, and capital of the Rheinisch-Bergischer Kreis (district).

== Geography ==
Bergisch Gladbach is east of the Rhine and about 10 km east of Cologne.

=== City structure ===
The urban area of Bergisch Gladbach is not divided into city districts (Stadtbezirke) with their own district representation. For statistical purposes, there are six statistical districts (statistische Bezirke), which are numbered consecutively and are divided into several districts (de: Stadtteile) with their own names. These are mainly name of former smaller settlements from which today's urban area developed, or new development areas whose names have been memorized over time for better orientation. Bensberg was an independent town until 1975. Before 1975, Schildgen belonged to the municipality of Odenthal.

- Statistical District 1: Schildgen (11), Katterbach (12), Nussbaum (13), Paffrath (14), Hand (15)
- Statistical District 2: City Center (21), Hebborn (22), Heidkamp (23), Gronau (24)
- Statistical District 3: Romaney (31), Herrenstrunden (32), Sand (33)
- Statistical District 4: Herkenrath (41), Asselborn (42), Bärbroich (43)
- Statistical District 5: Lückerath (51), Bensberg (52), Bockenberg (53), Kaule (54), Moitzfeld (55)
- Statistical District 6: Refrath (61), Alt Refrath (62), Kippekausen (63), Frankenforst (64), Lustheide (65)

=== Neighbouring municipalities ===
Beginning in the north, the neighbouring municipalities and neighbouring towns are clockwise Odenthal, Kürten, Overath, Rösrath, Cologne, and Leverkusen.

== History ==
Early settlements existed in the 13th century, but the town was officially founded only in 1856.

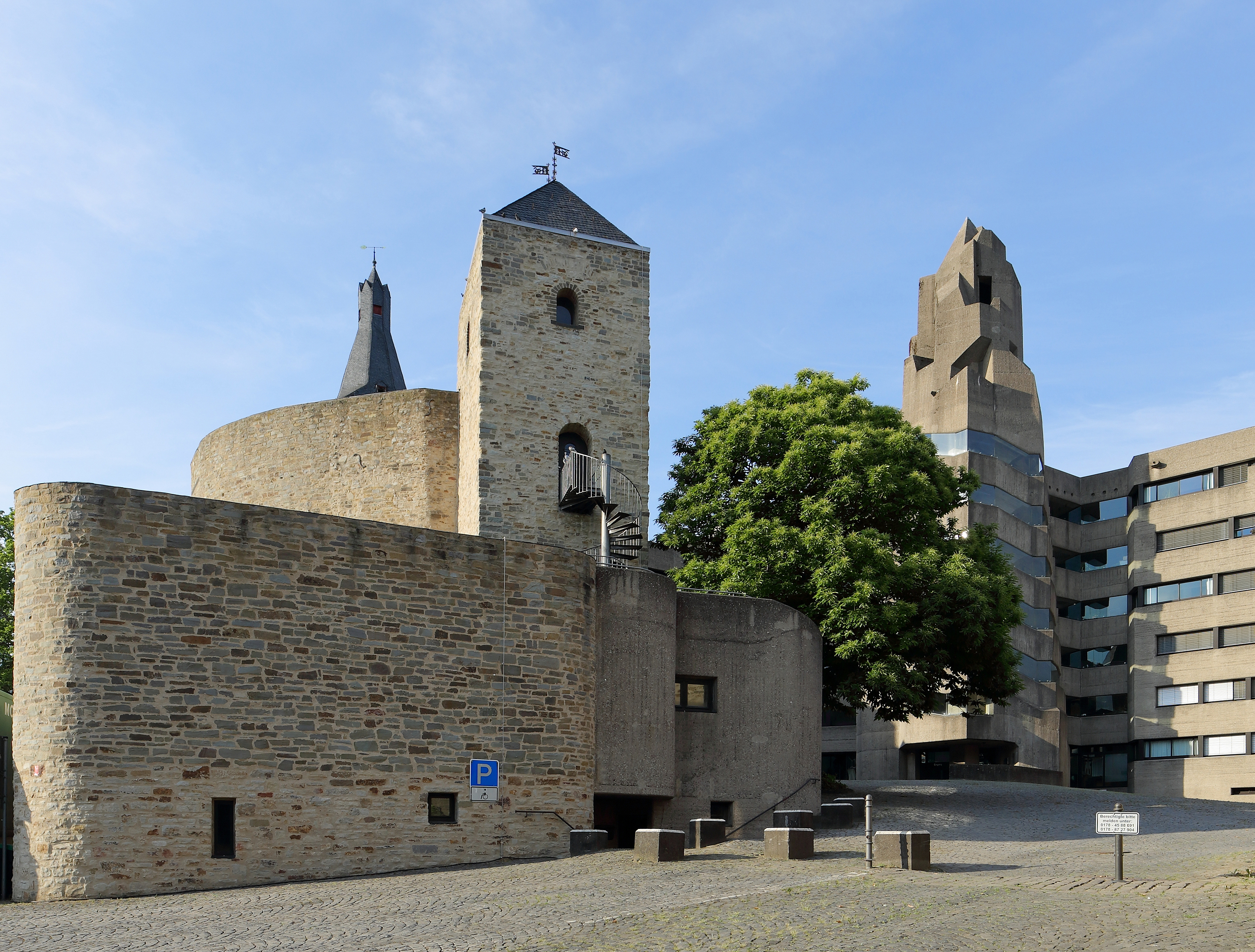
Old castle and town hall of Bensberg

The word Bergisch in the name does not originate from its location in the county of Berg, and it was not added to distinguish it from Mönchengladbach, as is believed by many people, but from the counts who gave their name to the region.

In the early 12th century, the counts of Berg settled in the area, which later became the Duchy of Berg (under Napoleon, it became a grand duchy). That is where the first part of the name (Bergisch) comes from, the town being located in the former County of Berg. The town is the administrative headquarters (Kreisstadt) of the Rheinish-Bergisch district (Kreis).

The second part of the name, Gladbach, originates from Low Rhenish (Bergisches Platt) and means canalised stream in reference to the small river (the Strunde) that was artificially canalised in early medieval times. In Bergisch Platt, the regional dialect, gelaat (laid) eventually evolved to glad (the 'd' is often pronounced as a 't'). The second part of the word, Bach, is the Standard German word for a small stream and refers to the Strunde.

In 1975, the town incorporated the neighbouring Bensberg, and when it reached a population of 100,000 in 1977, it was given city status.

== Population ==
Largest groups of foreign residents
| Nationality | Population (2014) |
|---|---|
| Turkey | 2,123 |
| Italy | 882 |
| Poland | 878 |
| Greece | 679 |
| Romania | 300 |
| Kosovo | 288 |
| Croatia | 260 |
| Austria | 257 |
| Russia | 241 |
| Bosnia & Herzegovina | 208 |

Historical population

| Year | Pop. | ±% p.a. |
|---|---|---|
| 1965 | 81,831 | — |
| 1970 | 91,410 | +2.24% |
| 1975 | 99,525 | +1.72% |
| 1980 | 101,478 | +0.39% |
| 1985 | 101,116 | −0.07% |
| 1990 | 104,037 | +0.57% |
| 1995 | 105,478 | +0.28% |

| Year | Pop. | ±% p.a. |
|---|---|---|
| 2000 | 105,693 | +0.04% |
| 2005 | 105,761 | +0.01% |
| 2010 | 105,723 | −0.01% |
| 2015 | 111,366 | +1.05% |
| 2020 | 111,636 | +0.05% |
| 2025 | 111,174 | −0.08% |

Source: Landesdatabank Nordrhein-Westfalen

== Economy ==
Paper manufacturing, printing, glass wool manufacturing, chocolate and high-tech industries are a large part of Bergisch Gladbach's economy.

== Transport ==
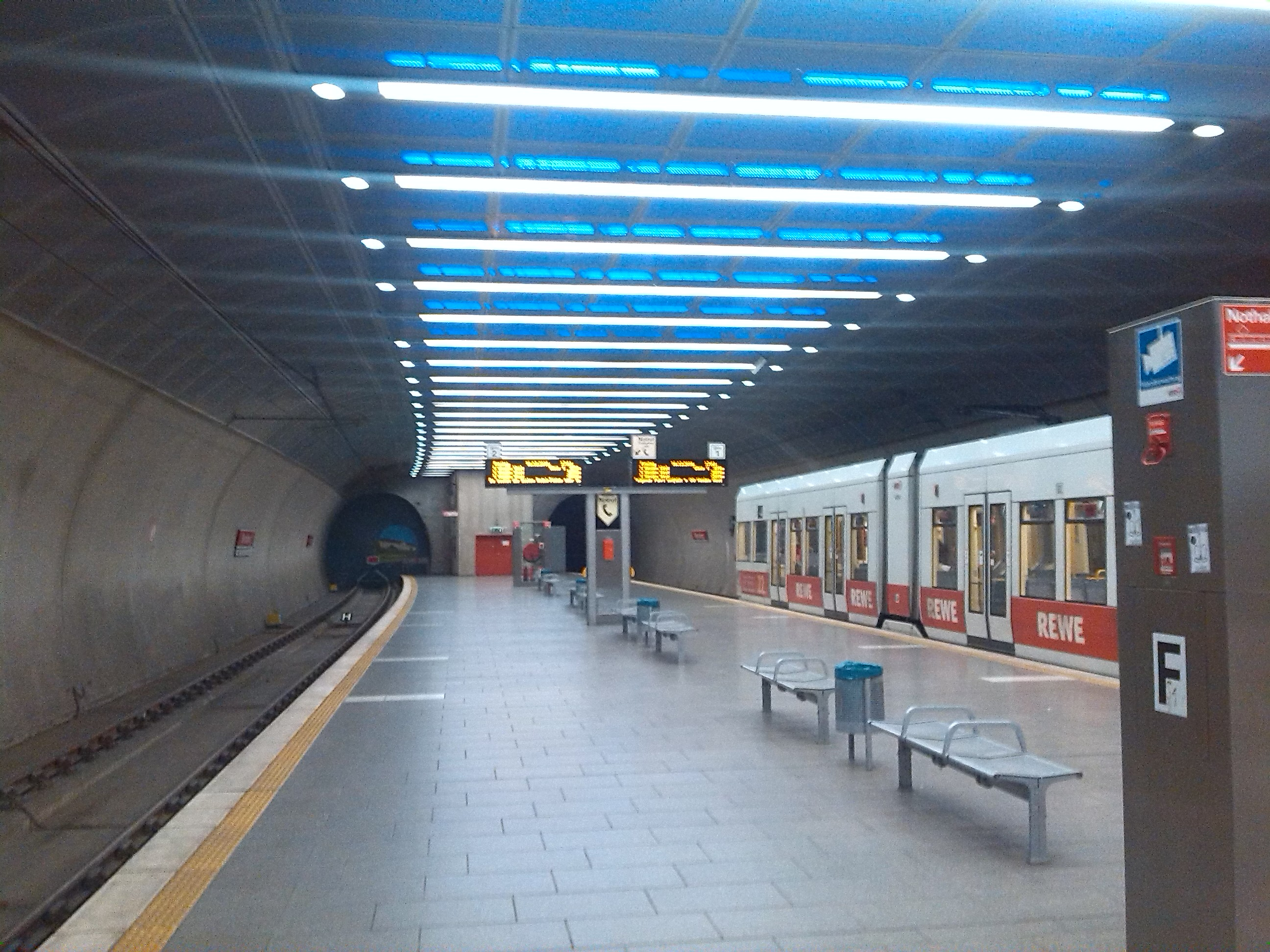
KVB station Bensberg

Line 1 of Cologne Stadtbahn runs from Bensberg station in Bergisch Gladbach via Kalk, Heumarkt, Friesenplatz, Junkersdorf and Lindenthal to Köln-Weiden West station. Suburban train line S11 of Rhine-Ruhr S-Bahn runs from Bergisch Gladbach station via Cologne and Düsseldorf downtown to Düsseldorf Airport terminal. Bergisch Gladbach is located in the area of the fare association Rheinland-Tarif. The city is served by Cologne Bonn Airport, which is located 15 km (9 mi) south of Bergisch Gladbach. Other nearest airport is Düsseldorf Airport, located 54 km (34 mi) north west.

== Politics ==
=== Mayor ===
The current mayor of Bergisch Gladbach is Marcel Kreuz of the Social Democratic Party (SPD), who was elected in 2025.

Previous mayoral election was held on 13 September 2020, and the results were as follows:

| Candidate | Party | Votes | % |
|---|---|---|---|
| Frank Stein | Social Democratic Party | 25,321 | 52.3 |
| Christian Buchen | Christian Democratic Union | 18,973 | 39.2 |
| Iro Herrmann | Citizens' Party GL | 2,093 | 4.3 |
| Günther Schöpf | Alternative for Germany | 2,014 | 4.2 |
| Valid votes | | 48,401 | 99.3 |
| Invalid votes | | 358 | 0.7 |
| Total | | 48,759 | 100.0 |
| Electorate/voter turnout | | 89,995 | 54.2 |
Source: City of Bergisch Gladbach

=== City council ===
The Bergisch Gladbach city council governs the city alongside the Mayor. The most recent city council election was held on 14 September 2025, and the results were as follows:

| Party | Votes | % | ± | Seats | ± |
|---|---|---|---|---|---|
| Christian Democratic Union (CDU) | 18,964 | 36.5 | ▲0.3 | 27 | ▲7 |
| Social Democratic Party (SPD) | 9,927 | 19.1 | ±0 | 14 | ▲4 |
| Alliance 90/The Greens (Grüne) | 9,428 | 18.1 | ▼10.6 | 13 | ▼3 |
| Alternative for Germany (AfD) | 5,344 | 10.3 | ▲5.7 | 7 | ▲4 |
| Die Linke (Linke) | 2,429 | 4.7 | New | 3 | New |
| Free Democratic Party (FDP) | 1,786 | 3.4 | ▼1.7 | 2 | ▼1 |
| Volt (Volt) | 1,562 | 3.0 | New | 2 | New |
| Free Voters' Association Bergisch Gladbach (FWG) | 1,314 | 2.5 | ▼0.9 | 2 | ±0 |
| Citizens' Party GL (BGL) | 1,241 | 2.4 | ▼0.5 | 2 | ±0 |
| Valid votes | 51,995 | 99.2 | | | |
| Invalid votes | 401 | 0.8 | | | |
| Total | 52,396 | 100.0 | | 72 | ▲16 |
| Electorate/voter turnout | 88,431 | 59,3 | ▲7.0 | | |
Source: City of Bergisch Gladbach

== Twin towns – sister cities ==
Bergisch Gladbach is twinned with:

- Beit Jala, Palestine (2010)
- Bourgoin-Jallieu, France (1956)
- Bucha, Ukraine (2022)
- Ganei Tikva, Israel (2012)
- Joinville-le-Pont, France (1960)
- Limassol, Cyprus (1991)
- Luton, England (1956)
- Marijampolė, Lithuania (1989)
- Pszczyna, Poland (1993)
- Runnymede, England (1995)
- Velsen, Netherlands (1956)

== Notable people ==
- Markus von Ahlen (born 1971), footballer and coach
- Rüdiger Baldauf (born 1961), jazz musician
- Astrid Benöhr (born 1957), endurance athlete
- Sebastian Blomberg (born 1972), actor
- Wolfgang Bosbach (born 1952), politician (CDU)
- Karl Budde (1850–1935), Protestant theologian
- Armin Falk (born 1968), economist
- Markus Feldenkirchen (born 1975), journalist
- Philomena Franz (1922 - 2022), Sinti writer and activist
- Vanessa Fuchs (born 1996), Germany's Next Topmodel winner of the season 2015
- Kerstin Gier (born 1966), author
- Volker Goetze (born 1972), German born, New York based musician composer and filmmaker
- Fabian Hambüchen (born 1987), artistic gymnast
- Götz Heidelberg (1923–2017), physicist, constructor and entrepreneur
- Waldemar Henrici (1878–1950), general and Reichsarbeitsdienstführer
- Mats Hummels (born 1988), footballer
- Hubert Käppel (born 1951), guitarist and music pedagogue
- Carolin Kebekus (born 1980), comedian, singer and actress
- Heidi Klum (born 1973), model and presenter
- Georg Koch (1972–2026), football goalkeeper
- Theo Koll (born 1958), journalist
- Brigitte Kraus (born 1956), middle distance runner
- German Mäurer (1811–1885), Prussian writer
- Veronika Moos-Brochhagen (born 1961), textile artist
- Benyamin Nuss (born 1989), pianist
- Bastian Oczipka (born 1989), footballer
- Uwe Ommer (born 1943), act, fashion and advertising photos
- Monika Piel (born 1951), journalist and presenter
- Tibor Pleiß (born 1989), basketball player
- Karin Sander (born 1957), artist
- David Schnell (born 1971), painter
- Barbara Stollberg-Rilinger (born 1955), historian
- Tim Wiese (born 1981), German football goalkeeper and wrestler

== Secondary schools in Bergisch Gladbach ==
- Albertus-Magnus-Gymnasium Bensberg/Bergisch Gladbach
- Gymnasium Herkenrath/Bergisch Gladbach
- Nicolaus-Cusanus-Gymnasium Bergisch Gladbach
- Otto-Hahn-Gymnasium Bensberg/Bergisch Gladbach
- Dietrich-Bonhoeffer-Gymnasium Bergisch Gladbach
- Integrierte-Gesamtschule-Paffrath Bergisch Gladbach

== See also ==
- Gustav Stresemann Institute
