= Hermann-Josef Tebroke =

German politician

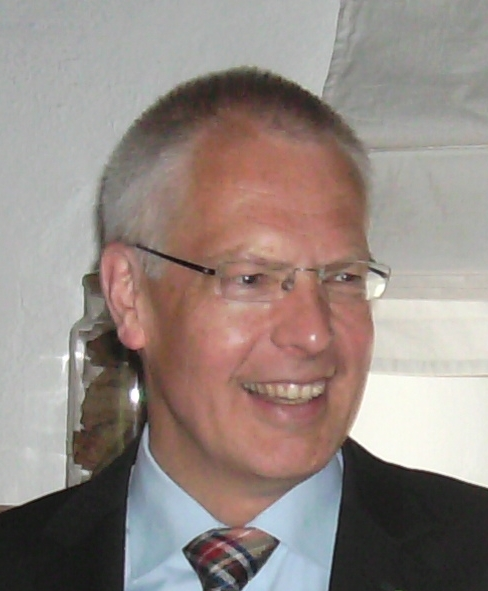
- Hermann-Josef Tebroke in 2013

Member of the Bundestag
- Incumbent
- Assumed office 2017
- Preceded by: Wolfgang Bosbach

Personal details
- Born: Hermann-Josef Johann Tebroke; 19 January 1964 (age 62) Rhede, West Germany (now Germany)
- Party: CDU
- Education: University of Münster

Hermann-Josef Johann Tebroke (born 19 January 1964) is a German politician of the Christian Democratic Union (CDU) who has been serving as a member of the Bundestag from the state of North Rhine-Westphalia since 2017.

== Political career ==
Tebroke became a member of the Bundestag in the 2017 German federal election. In parliament, he is a member of the Finance Committee. In 2024 Tebroke announced that he isn't seeking re-election for Bundestag.

== Other activities ==
- RheinEnergie AG, Member of the Advisory Board
- RWE, Member of the Advisory Board
