= Monika Griefahn =

German politician and activist (born 1954)

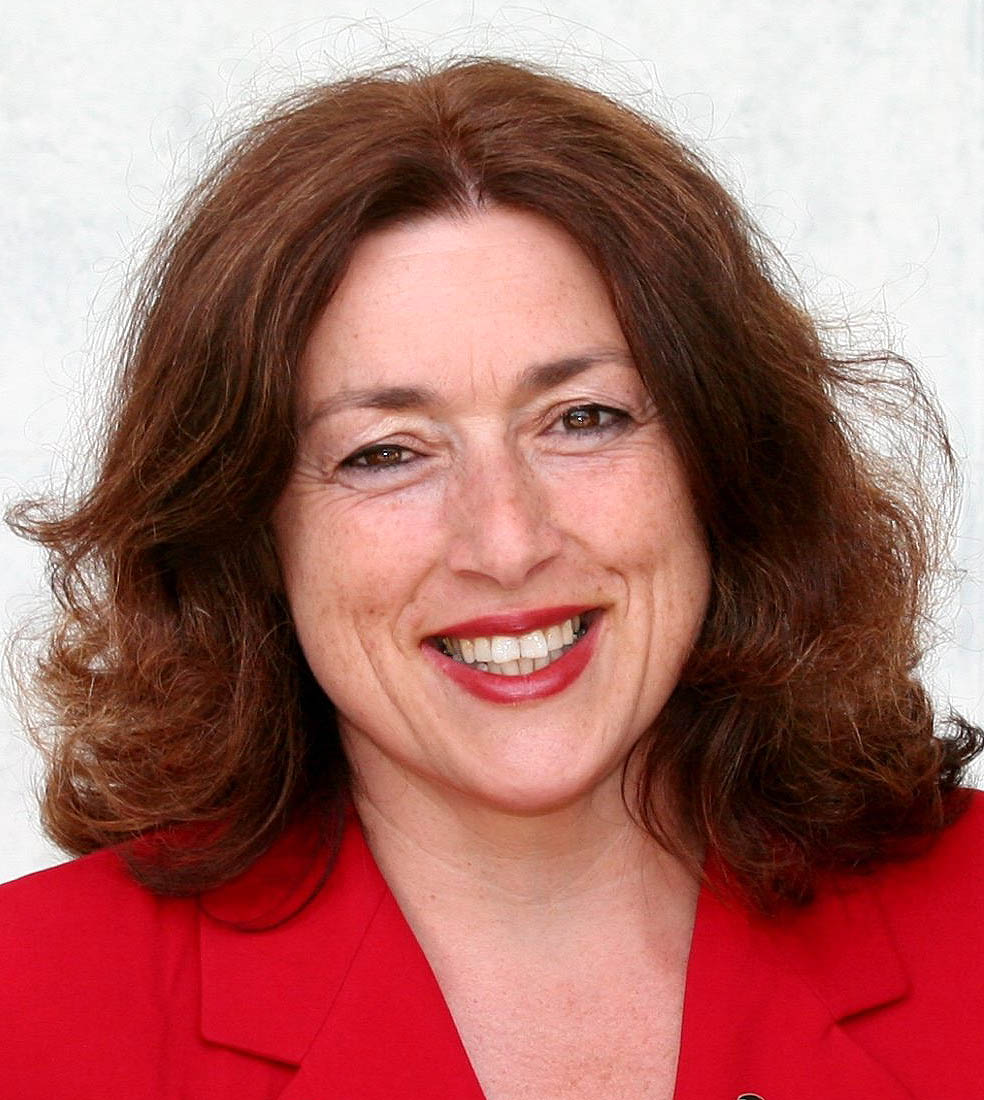
- Griefahn in 2008

Member of the Bundestag
- In office 26 October 1998 – 27 October 2009
- Preceded by: Rudolf Meyer
- Succeeded by: Michael Grosse-Brömer
- Constituency: Harburg (1998–2002); Soltau-Fallingbostel – Winsen L. (2002–2009)

Minister for the Environment of Lower Saxony
- In office 21 June 1990 – 30 March 1998
- Minister-President: Gerhard Schröder
- Preceded by: Werner Remmers
- Succeeded by: Wolfgang Jüttner

Member of the Landtag of Lower Saxony; for Hildesheim
- In office 23 June 1994 – 30 March 1998
- Preceded by: Leonore Auerbach
- Succeeded by: Elisabeth Conrady

Personal details
- Born: 3 October 1954 (age 72) Mülheim an der Ruhr, West Germany
- Party: Social Democratic
- Spouse: Michael Braungart
- Children: 3
- Occupation: Politician, activist
- Known for: Co-founder of Greenpeace Germany and member of the SPD

Monika Griefahn (born 3 October 1954) is a German politician and one of the co-founders of Greenpeace. She is a member of the Social Democratic Party (SPD).

Griefahn was a Member of the German Bundestag (1998–2009), serving as an expert on cultural affairs and media as well as foreign (cultural) policy. From 1990 to 1998 she was the State Minister of the Environment in the State of Lower Saxony. From 1980 to 1990 she was an activist in the environmental organization Greenpeace and the first woman on the international board of Greenpeace (1984–1990).

== Early life and education ==
After finishing school in 1973 Griefahn went to the universities of Göttingen and Hamburg to study mathematics and social sciences. She left university in 1979 with a diploma in sociology. Starting in 1973 she worked for the German-French Youth Organization and for YMCA Hamburg, offering adult education seminars for trade unions, church organizations and NGOs for more than a decade.

== Political career ==
=== Early activism ===
From 1980 onwards she became active in establishing Greenpeace in Germany, with its main office in Hamburg. She was the executive director until 1983. With Greenpeace Germany she organized campaigns against, among other environmental issues, chemical pollution as well as campaigns for the protection of the North Seas and the rivers Rhine and Elbe. In 1984 she became the first female member of the international board of Greenpeace. She was responsible for developing programs and skill training for the people working for Greenpeace all over the world until 1990. Additionally she helped found new offices in Austria, Belgium, Switzerland, Latin America and the former Soviet Union.

In 1992, Griefahn joined the Social Democratic Party (SPD) Germany.

=== State Minister for the Environment (1990–1998) ===
In 1990 Minister-President Gerhard Schröder of Lower Saxony named her as the Minister for the Environment, where she started special programs to support renewable energy systems (wind power, solar, biomass) in order to stop the use of nuclear power (more see "Public Offices"). She was in his first and in his second cabinet. One of her central concerns in environmental policy was to quit to the use of nuclear energy. Her plans, which finally became reality in 2011 (after the Fukushima nuclear accident), were blocked by directives of the Federal Ministry of the Environment, headed by Klaus Töpfer (1990–1994) and Angela Merkel (1994–1998). Parallel to her commitment against nuclear power Griefahn hurried along the extension of renewable energy in Lower Saxony with measures like an eco-fund and an atlas for wind energy. Her commitment contributed to the fact that the plans to phase out nuclear power became a reality between 1998 and 2005, when a coalition of the Social Democratic Party and the Greens led the Federal Government (First ans Second Schröder cabinet). In 2001 the law on the abandonment of nuclear energy came into effect.

As State Minister of the Environment, Griefahn initiated new policies on waste management. Waste had usually been stored on disposal sites or burnt in incineration plants. Griefahn put her focus on products which could more easily been disassembled, on the separation of different waste types and on different waste treatments – such as composting or mechanical separation. Consequently, there was no longer a need to build about ten incineration plants, which had been planned before her time of office.

Additionally she changed procurement directives for public offices in Lower Saxony in such a way as to make them become more ecological. She founded two national parks – Harz and Elbtalaue (biosphere reserve).

=== Member of the State Parliament (1994–1998) ===
After the 1994 Lower Saxony state election on 13 March 1994, Griefahn became a member of the Landtag of Lower Saxony.

=== Member of the German Parliament (1998–2009) ===
From 1998 to 2009 Griefahn was a Member of the Bundestag. From 1998 to 2005, SPD and Grüne formed the first red-green coalition on federal level (first Schröder cabinet and Second Schröder cabinet) and served as chair of the Committee on Cultural Affairs and Media from July 2000 to September 2005. From 1999 to 2000 and then from 2005 to 2009, she was also the spokesperson for the parliamentary group of the SPD for the Committee on Cultural Affairs and Media as well as for the Sub-Committee on Cultural Policy Abroad. Furthermore, she was a member of the Committee on Foreign Affairs (Auswärtiger Ausschuss) and of the Sub-committees on Cultural Policy Abroad and New Media.

Responsible for cultural policy, Griefahn initiated the founding of the German Games Award. She was also committed to the support of German films, strong copyright laws, and a decentralized structure of the book trade market by initiating a fixed bookprice law, cultural diversity and the expansion of Goethe-Institutes and German Schools abroad.

In 2005 Griefahn was elected chair of the bilateral committee on cultural diversity, which was appointed by the Bundestag and the French Assemblée Nationale.

In foreign policy her work focused on supporting renewable energy in German real estate all around the world (like German schools for example) as well as on the support of NGOs in the field of nature conservation and environmental protection. She was active in the Inter-Parliamentary Union (IPU) and the OECD for these issues.

In addition to her committee assignments, Griefahn served as deputy chair of the German-French Parliamentary Friendship Group from 2006 until 2009.

=== Return to politics ===
From 2015 until 2016, Griefahn served on a government-appointed commission tasked with recommending how to safeguard the funding of fulfilling Germany's exit from nuclear energy, under the leadership of co-chairs Ole von Beust, Matthias Platzeck and Jürgen Trittin.

In 2020, Griefahn became the SPD candidate for lord mayor of Mülheim an der Ruhr; she eventually lost against the Christian Democrat's candidate Marc Buchholz.

== Other activities ==
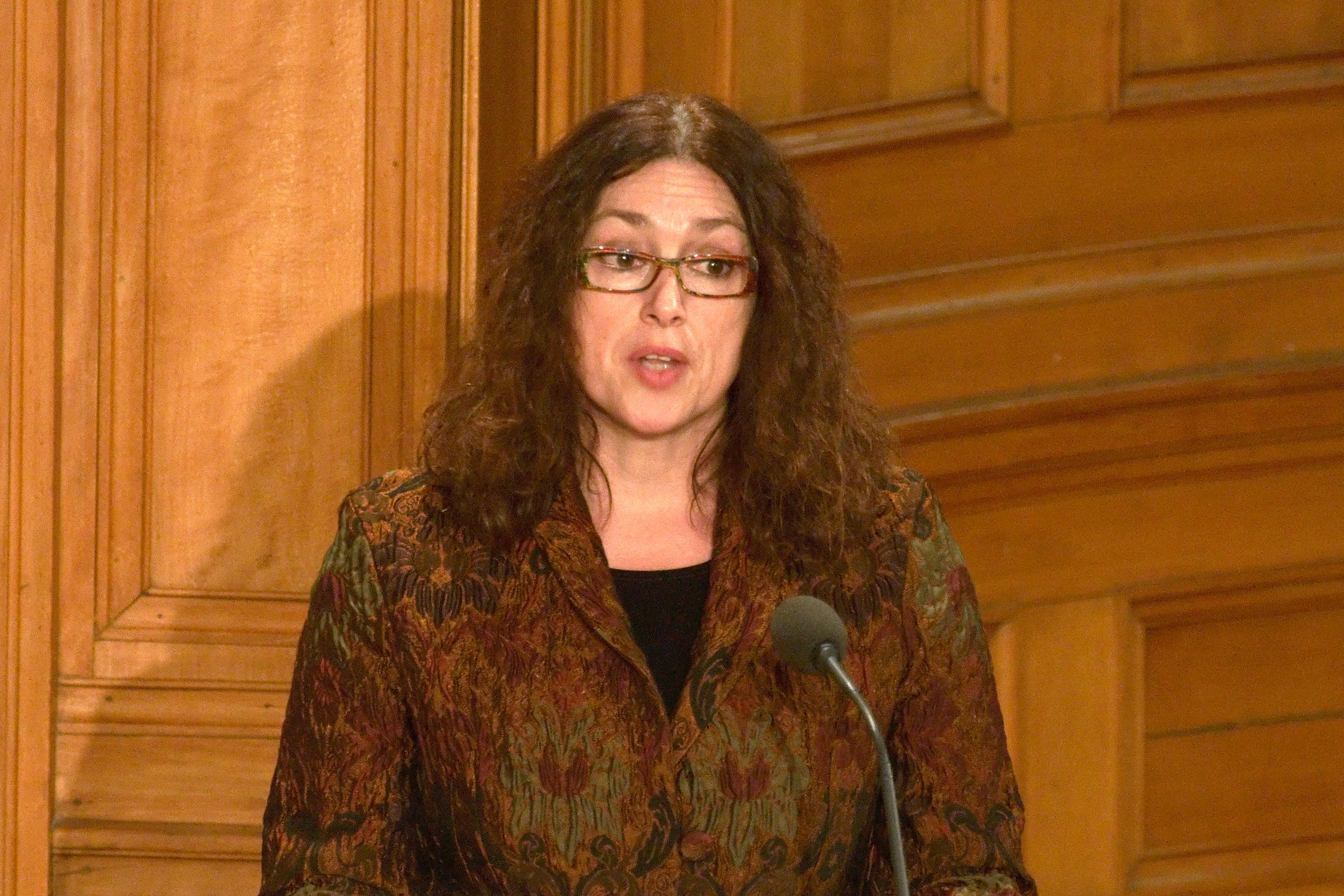
Griefahn in 2010

Since 1986 Griefahn has been volunteering for the Right Livelihood Award Foundation. She has been a member of both the jury and the board. In 2010 she was appointed co-chair alongside Jakob von Uexküll. In 2008 she became a member of the presidency of the German "Kirchentag", a biennial national festival for Protestants. Moreover, she is jury-chair of a national festival on ecological and nature films ("Ökofilmtour").

Additional activities include:

- Aktion Deutschland Hilft (Germany's Relief Coalition), Member of the Board of Trustees
- Cradle to Cradle Germany, Chair of the Board

== Personal life ==
Griefahn is married to Michael Braungart, an environmental chemist and professor of process engineering, who developed – in cooperation with the American architect William McDonough – the Cradle to Cradle design principle. Griefahn and Braungart have three children.

== Selected publications (German) ==
- Computerspiele als Kulturgut? In: S. Ganguin, B. Hoffmann (Hrsg.): Digitale Spielkultur. Kopaed Verlag, München 2010, ISBN 978-3-86736-343-3.
- Kulturwirtschaft und kulturelle Intelligenz. In: B. Wagner: Jahrbuch für Kulturpolitik 2008. Thema: Kulturwirtschaft und kreative Stadt. Bonn/Essen, S. 221–226.
- Kreativität – ein Wirtschaftsfaktor? In: Kulturforum der Sozialdemokratie (Hrsg.): Kulturnotizen. 11/2006, Berlin.
- Nachhaltigkeitspolitik und Kulturpolitik. In: Kulturpolitische Gesellschaft KuPoGe (Hrsg.): Kulturpolitische Mitteilungen. II/2002, Bonn.
- Nachhaltigkeitspolitik und Kulturpolitik – eine Verbindung mit Zukunft? In: H. Kurt, B. Wagner (Hrsg.): Kultur-Kunst-Nachhaltigkeit. Die Bedeutung von Kultur für das Leitbild Nachhaltige Entwicklung. Bonn/Essen, 2002, S. 59–68.
- (Hrsg.): Greenpeace. Wir kämpfen für eine Umwelt, in der wir leben können. Rowohlt, Reinbek bei Hamburg 1983, ISBN 3-498-02434-5.
- Weil ich ein Lied hab'. Die Politik einer Umweltministerin. Piper, München 1994, ISBN 3-492-03688-0.

== Selected speeches (English) ==
- 26 October 2010: "Necessary political framework conditions for sustainable building and social effects", speech delivered at Carleton University, Ottawa.
- 13 April 2008: "Pushing Back the Frontiers of Poverty"; speech on the occasion of the General Debate of the Inter-Parliamentary Union.
- 15 October 2007: "The cultural dimension of environmentalism"; Talk delivered at Harvard University, Massachusetts, USA.
- 29 April 2007: "Global warming: ten years after Kyoto"; Speech for the 116th IPU Assembly in Bali.

== Literature ==
- Jürgen Streich: Monika Griefahn. Politik, Positionen, Perspektiven. Zebulon, Köln 1997, ISBN 3-928679-60-0
