= Barbara Hendricks (politician) =

German politician (born 1952)

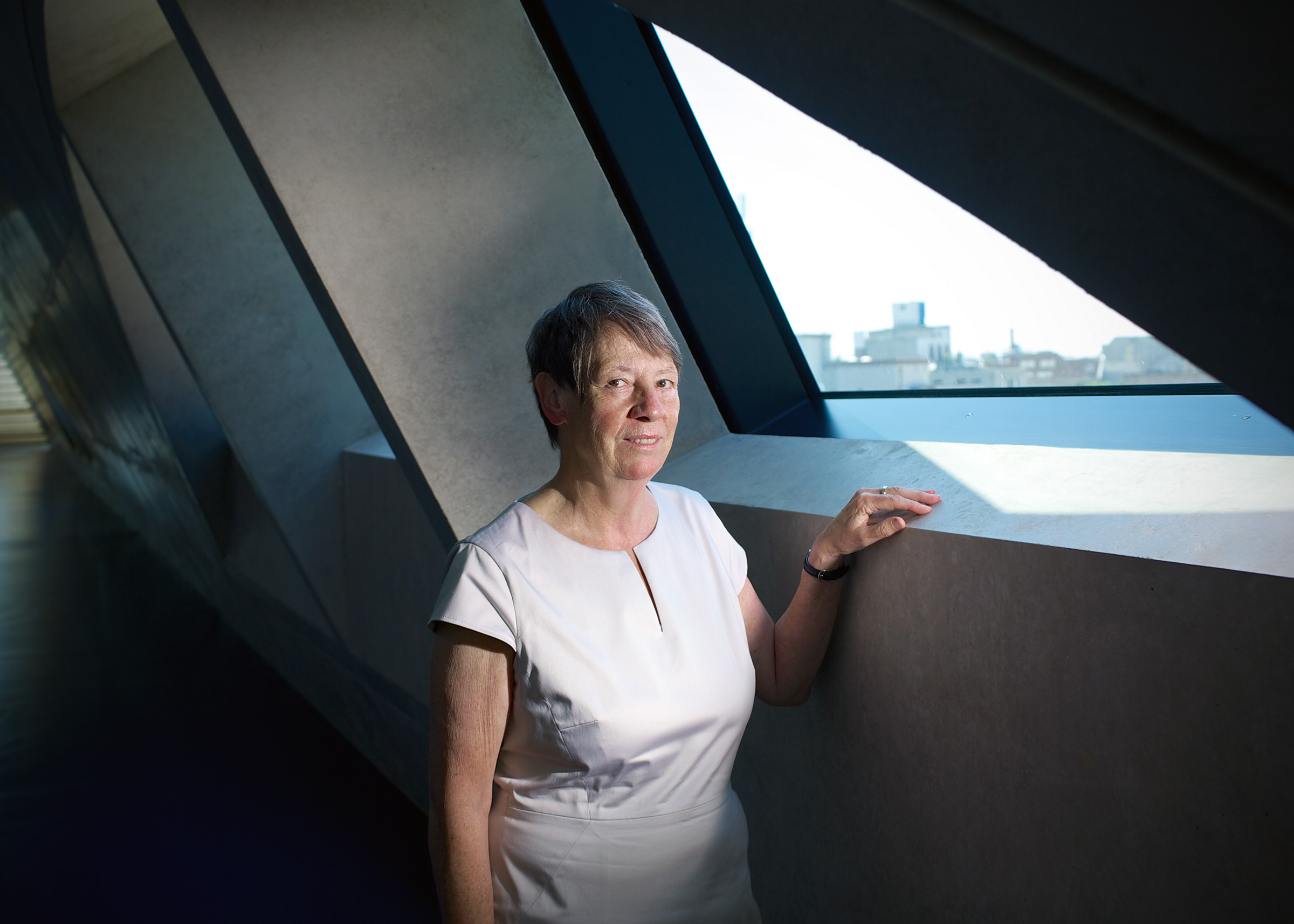
- Barbara Hendricks photographed by Oliver Mark at the Federal Ministry for the Environment, Nature Conservation, Nuclear Safety and Consumer Protection in Berlin (2015)

Minister for the Environment, Nature Conservation, Building and Nuclear Safety
- In office 17 December 2013 – 14 March 2018
- Chancellor: Angela Merkel
- Preceded by: Peter Altmaier
- Succeeded by: Svenja Schulze

Treasurer of the Social Democratic Party
- In office 26 October 2007 – 26 January 2014
- Leader: Kurt Beck; Franz Müntefering; Sigmar Gabriel
- Preceded by: Inge Wettig-Danielmeier
- Succeeded by: Dietmar Nietan

Parliamentary Secretary of State for Finance
- In office 27 October 1998 – 16 November 2007
- Minister: Oskar Lafontaine; Hans Eichel; Peer Steinbrück
- Preceded by: Imgard Karwatzki
- Succeeded by: Steffen Kampeter

Member of the Bundestag for North Rhine-Westphalia
- In office 16 October 1994 – 26 October 2021
- Constituency: Social Democratic Party List

Personal details
- Born: 29 April 1952 (age 74) Kleve, West Germany
- Party: Social Democratic Party
- Education: University of Bonn

Barbara Anne Hendricks (born 29 April 1952) is a German politician of the Social Democratic Party (SPD) who served as Federal Minister for the Environment, Nature Conservation and Nuclear Safety in the government of Chancellor Angela Merkel from 2013 until 2018.

From 2007 to 2013, Hendricks was Federal Treasurer of the SPD, and from 1998 to 2007 she was Parliamentary Secretary of State at the Federal Ministry of Finance.

== Early life and career ==
Barbara Hendricks was born in Kleve.

After obtaining her Abitur in 1970 at the Johanna Sebus Gymnasium in Kleve, Hendricks studied History and Social Sciences in Bonn, passing the Staatsexamen examination for high school teachers in 1976. She then worked for the Association for Student Affairs until 1978. After that, until 1981, she was a deputy press secretary at the press office of the Bundestag parliamentary party of the SPD. In 1980 she was awarded a doctorate based on a thesis entitled Die Entwicklung der Margarineindustrie am unteren Niederrhein [The development of the margarine industry on the lower Rhine]. She was then press secretary of the minister of finance of the state of North Rhine-Westphalia until 1990. In 1991 she was appointed Permanent Secretary at the Ministry of the Environment, Spatial Planning and Agriculture of the State of North Rhine-Westphalia.

== Political career ==
=== Early beginnings ===
Barbara Hendricks has been a member of the SPD since 1972 and has been the president of the SPD party organization for the District of Kleve since 1989. From 1984 to 1989 she was a member of the District Council (Kreistag) of the Rural District of Kleve. From 1990 to 2001 she was a member of the party council. From 1987 to 2001 she was a member of the state party executive of the SPD in North Rhine-Westphalia – as from 1996 as treasurer.

Since the 1994 elections, Hendricks has been a member of the Bundestag. In parliament, she served on the Finance Committee from 1994 until 1998. In addition, from October 1995 to November 1998, she was a member of the executive of the SPD parliamentary group, under the leadership of the group’s chairman Rudolf Scharping. Hendricks was always elected to the Bundestag via the party list of the state of North Rhine-Westphalia. Since 2001 she has been a member of the SPD (federal) party executive.

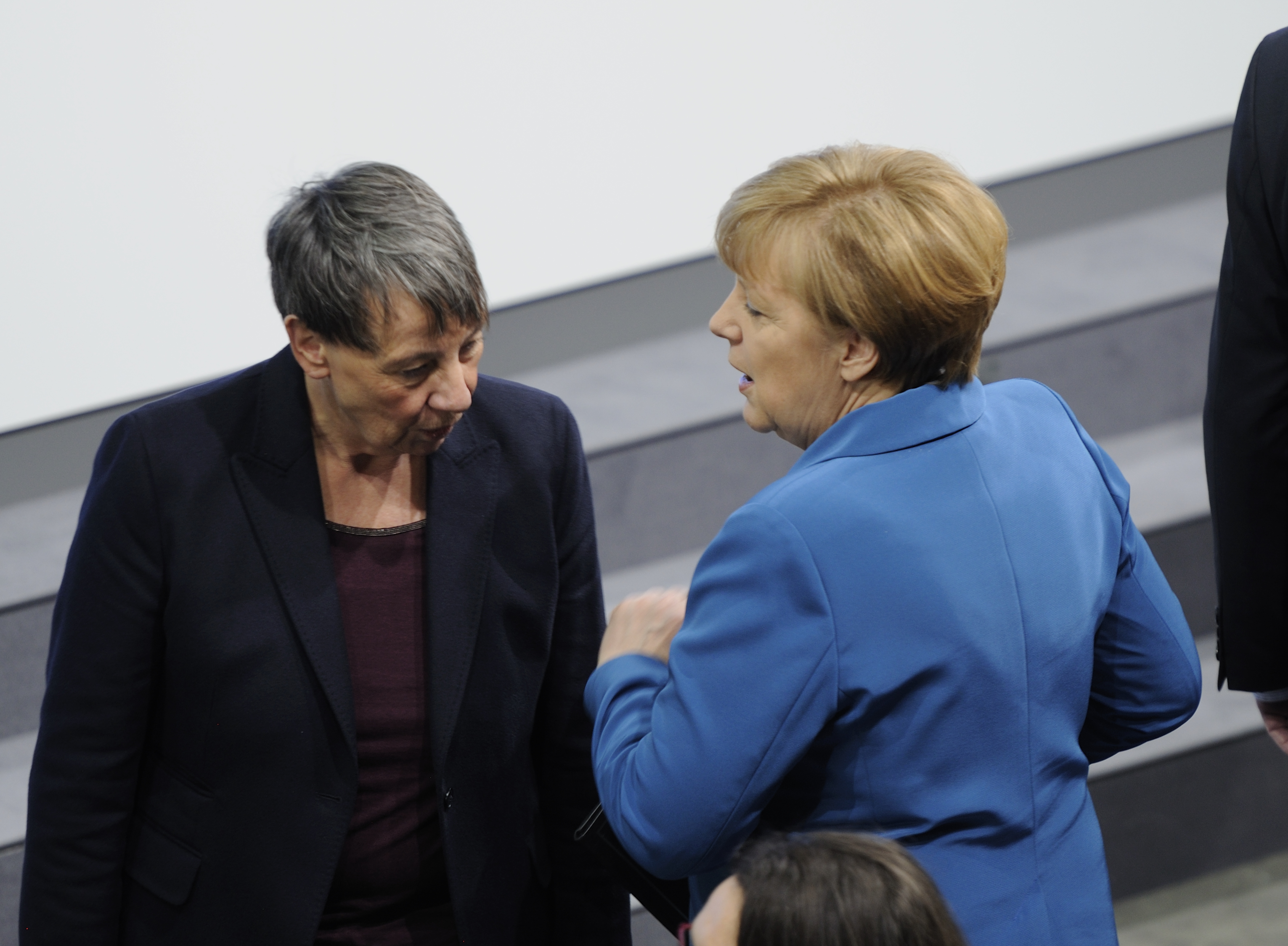
Barbara Hendricks and Angela Merkel in 2013

=== Parliamentary State Secretary to the Federal Minister of Finance, 1998–2007 ===
Following the 1998 German federal election, on 27 October 1998 Hendricks was appointed Parliamentary State Secretary to the Federal Minister of Finance in the cabinet of Chancellor Gerhard Schröder.

From 22 November 2005, Hendricks continued in this office in the first cabinet of Chancellor Angela Merkel – meaning that she was a state secretary under three finance ministers: Oskar Lafontaine, Hans Eichel, and Peer Steinbrück. She left this office on 16 November 2007, after being elected federal treasurer of the SPD.

=== Treasurer of the SPD, 2007–2013 ===
From October 2007, Hendricks served as SPD federal treasurer, a position in which she administered the party-owned media holding Print and Publishing Society (DDVG) with stakes in regional newspapers such as Hannoversche Allgemeine Zeitung, Leipziger Volkszeitung and Märkische Allgemeine.

In the campaign for the 2009 German federal election Hendricks was a member of the "shadow cabinet" of the SPD candidate for the chancellorship, Frank-Walter Steinmeier, where she was responsible for consumer affairs. Following the elections, she served on the Committee on Economic Cooperation and Development until 2013. On the committee, she was her parliamentary group’s rapporteur on heavily indebted poor countries (HIPC); poverty reduction strategies (PRSP); the International Monetary Fund (IMF); the World Bank; and the European Development Fund (EDF).

In the negotiations to form a coalition government following the 2013 federal elections, Hendricks was part of the 15-member leadership circle chaired by Angela Merkel, Horst Seehofer and Sigmar Gabriel.

Until 2014 Hendricks also served as a member of the executive of the SPD Culture Forum, mainly responsible for culture financing.

=== Federal Minister for the Environment, Nature Conservation, Building and Nuclear Safety, 2013–2018 ===
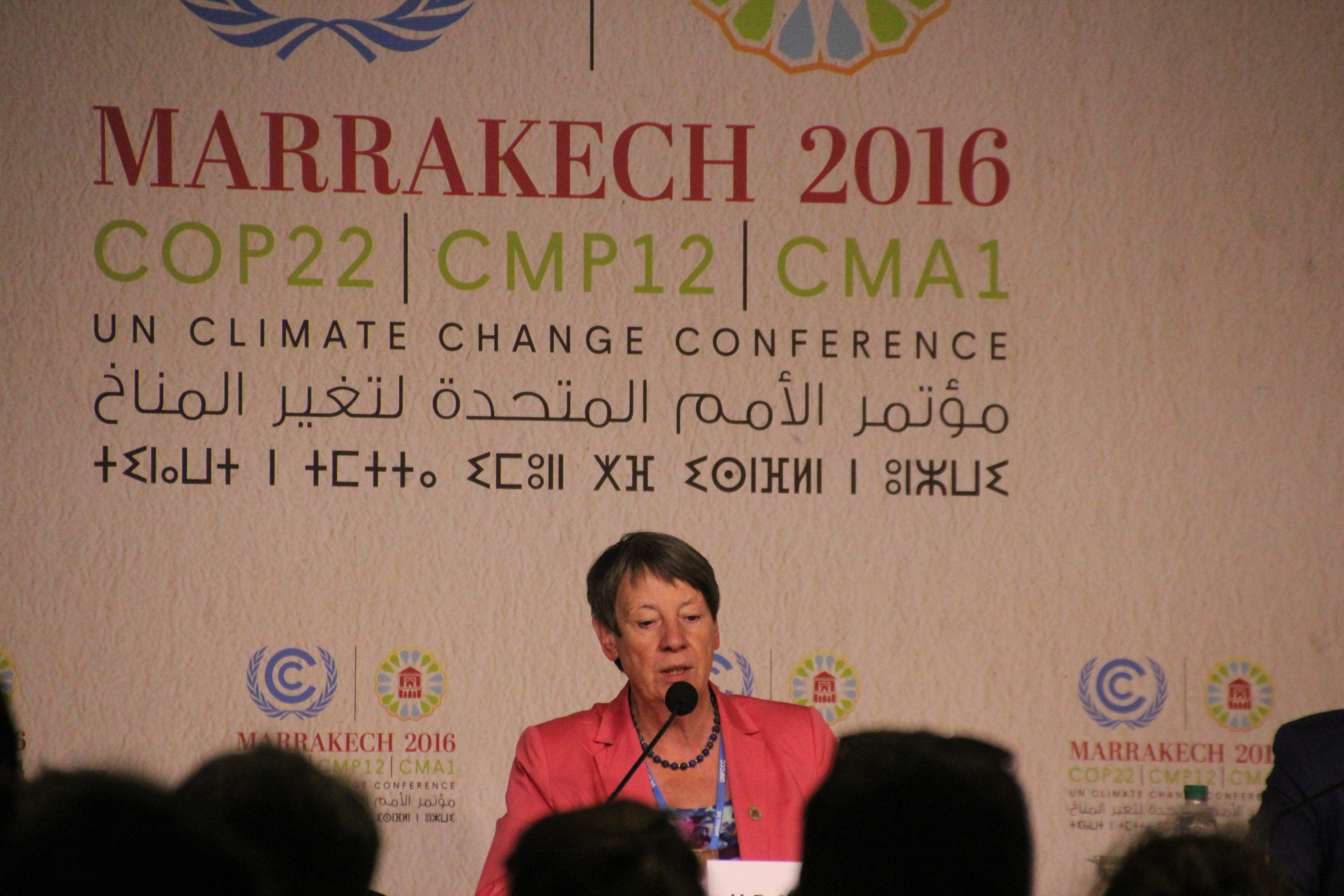
At 2016 UNFCCC Conference COP22 in Marrakech (Africa)

From 17 December 2013, Hendricks served as Federal Minister for the Environment, Nature Conservation, Building and Nuclear Safety in the third cabinet of Angela Merkel.

Hendricks led the German delegations to the 2014 United Nations Climate Change Conference in Lima and the 2015 United Nations Climate Change Conference in Paris. In August 2015, she was part of Chancellor Merkel’s delegation to the first joint cabinet meeting of the governments of Germany and Brazil in Brasília.

In early 2015, Hendricks proposed a new draft law that imposes an outright ban on fracking for shale gas in the following years and only allow scientific test drilling under strict conditions to assess the risks and environmental impact. The resulting legislation that passed the cabinet in April 2015 softened her line somewhat, restricting fracking until 2019, after which commercial fracking could only go forward after passing various tough regulatory hurdles. The legislation, however, allows fracking for deep-lying or "tight" gas, a technology that has been used for decades in Germany.

By early 2016, Hendricks entered in talks with various stakeholders on drawing up a plan over how to exit coal-fired power generation in Germany, later named 'Climate Action Plan 2050'.

=== Later career ===
Following the 2017 elections, Hendricks remained in office until 2018 but left with the new coalition government of Chancellor Angela Merkel taking over. She joined the Parliamentary Committee on Foreign Affairs. In addition to her committee assignments, she served as deputy chairwoman of the Parliamentary Friendship Group for Relations with the Cono Sur States (Argentina, Chile, Paraguay, Uruguay). In February 2021, Hendricks said she would not contest the 2021 elections.

== Other activities ==
=== Corporate boards ===
- Messe Berlin, Member of the Supervisory Board (since 2019)
- KfW, ex-officio Member of the Board of Supervisory Directors (2014–2018)
- Volksfürsorge Deutsche Lebensversicherung AG, Member of the Advisory Board (2005–2013)
- German Investment Corporation (DEG), Member of the Supervisory Board (2005–2007)
- IKB Deutsche Industriebank, Member of the Advisory Board (2005–2007)

=== Cultural institutions ===
- Federal Cultural Foundation, Member of the Board of Trustees (2002–2007)
- Jewish Museum, Berlin, Alternate Member of the Board of Trustees (2001–2007)
- Museum Foundation Post and Telecommunication, Chairwoman of the Board of Trustees (1998–2005)

=== Others ===
- Central Committee of German Catholics, Member
- Friedrich Ebert Foundation (FES), Member of the Board
- Aktion Pro Humanität foundation., Member of the Board of Trustees
- Denkwerk Demokratie, Member of the Advisory Board
- German-Dutch Conference, Member of the Steering Board
- Magnus Hirschfeld Foundation, Member of the Board of Trustees
- German Foundation for World Population (DSW), Member of the Parliamentary Advisory Board (–2021)
- Federal Agency for Civic Education, Member of the Board of Trustees (2010–2014)
- German Federal Environmental Foundation (DBU), Member of the Board of Trustees (2002–2007)
- Gegen Vergessen – Für Demokratie, Member
- IG Bergbau, Chemie, Energie (IG BCE), Member

== Personal life ==
Hendricks is openly lesbian. She is Catholic. After the legalisation of same-sex marriage in Germany, Hendricks married her long-term partner Valérie Vauzanges in October 2017.

== Cabinets ==
- First Schröder cabinet (junior minister)
- Second Schröder cabinet (junior minister)
- First Merkel cabinet (junior minister)
- Third Merkel cabinet (cabinet minister)

== Works ==
- Literature by and about Barbara Hendricks in the German National Library catalogue
- Barbara Hendricks: Steuergerechtigkeit für Familien [Tax justice for families] In: Wolfgang Thierse (ed.): Religion ist keine Privatsache [Religion is not a private matter]. Patmos, Düsseldorf 2000.

== Awards ==
- Order of Merit of the Federal Republic of Germany

Political offices
Preceded by Peter Altmaier	Minister for the Environment, Nature Conservation, Building and Nuclear Safety; 2013–present	Incumbent
