= Cabinet Schröder I (Lower Saxony) =

First Cabinet of Gerhard Schröder Cabinet Schröder I
- 19th Cabinet of Lower Saxony
- 21 June 1990 – 20 June 1994
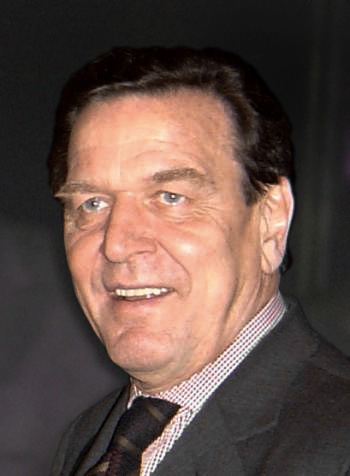
- Gerhard Schröder
- Date formed: 21 June 1990
- Date dissolved: 20 June 1994 (3 years, 11 months, 4 weeks and 2 days)

People and organisations
- Chancellor: Helmut Kohl
- Minister President: Gerhard Schröder
- Deputy Minister President: Gerhard Glogowski
- Member party: Social Democratic Party; Alliance 90/The Greens
- Status in legislature: Coalition
- Opposition party: Christian Democratic Union; Free Democratic Party
- Opposition leader: Christian Democratic Union

History
- Election: 1990 Lower Saxony state election
- Legislature term: 12th Landtag of Lower Saxony
- Predecessor: Cabinet Albrecht V
- Successor: Cabinet Schröder II

The Cabinet Schröder I was the state government of the German state of Lower Saxony from 21 June 1990 until 20 June 1994. The Cabinet was headed by Minister President Gerhard Schröder and was formed by the Social Democratic Party and the Alliance '90/The Greens, after Schröder's winning of the 1990 Lower Saxony state election. On 21 June 1990 Schröder was elected and sworn in as Minister President by the Landtag of Lower Saxony. It was succeeded by Schröder's second and third cabinets.

Schröder left the position in 1998 upon being elected Chancellor. Two members of this cabinet – Funke and Trittin – were also part of Schröder's first cabinet as Chancellor.

== Composition ==
| Portfolio | Minister | Took office | Left office | Party |
|---|---|---|---|---|
| Minister President | Gerhard Schröder | 21 June 1990 | 20 June 1994 | SPD |
| Deputy Minister President; Minister of the Interior | Gerhard Glogowski | 21 June 1990 | 20 June 1994 | SPD |
| Minister of Economics, Technology and Transport | Peter Fischer | 21 June 1990 | 20 June 1994 | SPD |
| Minister of Nutrition, Agriculture and Forestry | Karl-Heinz Funke | 21 June 1990 | 20 June 1994 | SPD |
| Minister of Finance | Hinrich Swieter | 21 June 1990 | 20 June 1994 | SPD |
| Minister of Justice | Heidrun Alm-Merk | 21 June 1990 | 20 June 1994 | SPD |
| Minister of Education | Rolf Wernstedt | 21 June 1990 | 20 June 1994 | SPD |
| Minister of Science and Culture | Helga Schuchardt | 21 June 1990 | 20 June 1994 | Independent |
| Minister of the Environment | Monika Griefahn | 21 June 1990 | 20 June 1994 | SPD |
| Minister of Social Affairs | Walter Hiller | 21 June 1990 | 20 June 1994 | SPD |
| Minister of Women | Waltraud Schoppe | 21 June 1990 | 20 June 1994 | Greens |
| Minister of Federal and European Affairs | Jürgen Trittin | 21 June 1990 | 20 June 1994 | Greens |
