= Cabinet Schröder II (Lower Saxony) =

Former government of Lower Saxony

Second Cabinet of Gerhard Schröder Cabinet Schröder II
- 20th Cabinet of Lower Saxony
- 20 June 1994 – 30 March 1998
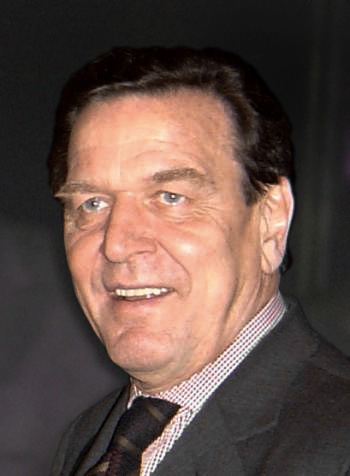
- Gerhard Schröder
- Date formed: 20 June 1994
- Date dissolved: 30 March 1998 (3 years, 9 months, 1 week and 3 days)

People and organisations
- Chancellor: Helmut Kohl
- Minister President: Gerhard Schröder
- Deputy Minister President: Gerhard Glogowski
- Member party: Social Democratic Party
- Opposition party: Christian Democratic Union; Alliance 90/The Greens
- Opposition leader: Christian Democratic Union

History
- Election: 1994 Lower Saxony state election
- Legislature term: 13th Landtag of Lower Saxony
- Predecessor: Cabinet Schröder I
- Successor: Cabinet Schröder III

The Cabinet Schröder II was the state government of the German state of Lower Saxony from 20 June 1994 until 30 March 1998. The Cabinet was headed by Minister President Gerhard Schröder and was formed by the Social Democratic Party, after Schröder's winning of the 1994 Lower Saxony state election. On 20 June 1994 Schröder was re-elected and sworn in as Minister President by the Landtag of Lower Saxony. It was succeeded by Schröder's third and last cabinet.

Schröder left the position in 1998 upon being elected Chancellor. One member of this cabinet – Funke – was also part of Schröder's first cabinet as Chancellor.

== Composition ==
Portfolio	Minister	Took office	Left office	Party
Minister President	Gerhard Schröder	20 June 1994	30 March 1998	SPD
Deputy Minister President & Minister of the Interior	Gerhard Glogowski	20 June 1994	30 March 1998	SPD
Minister of Economics, Technology and Transport	Peter Fischer	20 June 1994	30 March 1998	SPD
Minister of Nutrition, Agriculture and Forestry	Karl-Heinz Funke	20 June 1994	30 March 1998	SPD
Minister of Finance	Hinrich Swieter	20 June 1994	1 November 1996	SPD
Minister of Finance	Willi Waike	1 November 1996	30 March 1998	SPD
Minister of Justice	Heidrun Alm-Merk	21 June 1990	20 June 1994	SPD
Minister of Education	Rolf Wernstedt	20 June 1994	30 March 1998	SPD
Minister of Science and Culture	Helga Schuchardt	20 June 1994	30 March 1998	Independent
Minister of the Environment	Monika Griefahn	20 June 1994	30 March 1998	SPD
Minister of Social Affairs	Walter Hiller	20 June 1994	15 November 1996	SPD
Minister of Social Affairs	Wolf Weber	15 November 1996	30 March 1998	SPD
Minister of Women	Christina Bührmann	20 June 1994	30 March 1998	SPD
Minister of European Affairs	Heidrun Merk	5 November 1996	30 March 1998	SPD
