= Bastian Weiser =

German footballer (born 1990)

Personal information
- Date of birth: 19 June 1990 (age 36)
- Place of birth: Germany
- Height: 1.74 m (5 ft 9 in)
- Position: Midfielder

Youth career
- 1994: 1. FC Kleve
- 1995–2003: SV Siegfried Materborn
- 2003–2010: NEC Nijmegen

Senior career*
Years	Team	Apps	(Gls)
2010	NEC Nijmegen	1	(0)
2010–2017	EHC Hoensbroek		
- * Club domestic league appearances and goals

Sebastian Weiser (born 19 June 1990) is a German former footballer who played as a midfielder.

== Career ==
Weiser started playing football at the age of four. He joined the youth academy of Dutch side NEC Nijmegen at the age of thirteen. In May 2009 he was "considered the greatest talent of his [age] group" at U18 level according to the Dutch daily newspaper De Gelderlander. He was promoted to NEC Nijmegen's first team in summer 2009 and signed a one-year contract with a club-side option of a further year. On 10 April 2010, Weiser debuted for the club during a 0–0 draw with AZ Alkmaar. In 2010, he signed for Dutch side EHC Hoensbroek. Weiser was regarded as one of the club's most important players.

== Style of play ==
Weiser mainly operated as a central midfielder.

== Personal life ==
Weiser is a native of Kleve, Germany. He attended Johanna-Sebus-Gymnasium. Weiser obtained his high school diploma in 2009. He has been a supporter of German Bundesliga side Borussia Dortmund.
