= Harburg (electoral district) =

Federal electoral district of Germany

Coordinates: 53°19′47″N 10°04′48″E

36 Harburg
- Former electoral district for the Bundestag
- Harburg in 2025
- State: Lower Saxony
- Population: 254,400 (2019)
- Electorate: 201,740 (2021)
- Major settlements: Buchholz in der Nordheide; Winsen (Luhe)
- Area: 1,248.5 km^{2}

Former electoral district
- Created: 1980; 2009 (re-established)
- Abolished: 2002
- Party: CDU
- Member: Cornell Babendererde
- Elected: 2025

Harburg is an electoral constituency (German: Wahlkreis) represented in the Bundestag. It elects one member via first-past-the-post voting. Under the current constituency numbering system, it is designated as constituency 36. It is located in northern Lower Saxony, comprising the district of Harburg.

Harburg was created for the 1980 federal election. It was abolished in 2002 and re-established in the 2009 federal election. Since 2025, it has been represented by Cornell Babendererde from the Christian Democratic Union of Germany (CDU). Before that it had been held by Svenja Stadler of the Social Democratic Party (SPD).

== Geography ==
Harburg is located in northern Lower Saxony. As of the 2021 federal election, it comprises the Harburg district.

== History ==
Harburg was created in 1980 and contained parts of the abolished constituency of Harburg – Soltau. In its first incarnation, it was constituency 35 in the numbering system, and comprised the Harburg district. It was abolished in the 2002 election, and divided between the new constituencies of Soltau-Fallingbostel – Winsen Luhe and Lüchow-Dannenberg – Lüneburg.

The constituency was re-established in the 2009 election. It was constituency number 37. Since the 2013 election, it has been constituency number 36. Its borders have not changed since its re-establishment.

== Members ==
The constituency was first held by Herbert Helmrich of the Christian Democratic Union (CDU), who served from 1980 until 1994. He was succeeded by fellow CDU member Rudolf Meyer, who served until 1998. In 1998, Monika Griefahn of the Social Democratic Party (SPD) won the constituency, serving until its abolition in the next Bundestag term. After its re-establishment in the 2009 election, Michael Grosse-Brömer of the CDU won the constituency. Svenja Stadler regained it for the SPD in 2021.

Election	Member	Party	%
1980	Herbert Helmrich	CDU	44.2
1983	Herbert Helmrich	CDU	54.6
1987	Herbert Helmrich	CDU	50.3
1990	Herbert Helmrich	CDU	49.2
1994	Rudolf Meyer	CDU	48.2
1998	Monika Griefahn	SPD	46.6
Abolished (2002–2009)
2009	Michael Grosse-Brömer	CDU	40.6
2013	Michael Grosse-Brömer	CDU	45.2
2017	Michael Grosse-Brömer	CDU	40.6
2021	Svenja Stadler	SPD	31.0
2025	Cornell Babendererde	CDU	33.2

== Election results ==
=== 2025 election ===
Federal election (2025): Harburg
Notes:	Blue background denotes the winner of the electorate vote. Pink background denotes a candidate elected from their party list. Yellow background denotes an electorate win by a list member, or other incumbent. A ✓ or ✗ denotes status of any incumbent, win or lose respectively.						
Party	Candidate	Votes	%	±%	Party votes	%	±%
CDU	Cornell Babendererde	57,718	33.2	▲4.1	53,029	30.4	▲5.6
SPD	✗ Svenja Stadler	45,742	26.3	▼4.7	35.733	20.5	▼8.6
AfD	Henning Schwieger	28,906	16.6	▲9.8	29,324	16.8	▲9.6
Greens	Frerk Meyer	18,423	10.6	▼4.4	22,502	12.9	▼3.8
Left	Steffen Wetzel	10,309	5.9	▲3.3	12,298	7.1	▲4.1
BSW					6,233	3.6	
FDP	Ingmar Schmidt	6,047	3.5	▼5.5	8,478	4.9	▼7.8
FW	Andreas Oppermann	3,142	1.8	▼0.4	1,602	0.9	▼0.6
Volt	Michael Riedel	2,625	1.5		1,461	0.8	▲0.6
Tierschutzpartei					1,991	1.1	▼0.3
Independent	Jochen Manske	1,046	0.6				
PARTEI					704	0.4	▼0.3
dieBasis					491	0.3	▼1.2
Pirates					258	0.1	▼0.2
BD					189	0.1	
Humanists					105	0.1	0.0
MLPD					31	0.0	0.0
Informal votes		1,176			705		
Total valid votes		173,958			174,429		
Turnout		175,134	86.4	▲6.3			
CDU gain from SPD	Majority	11,976	6.9				

=== 2021 election ===
Federal election (2021): Harburg
Notes:	Blue background denotes the winner of the electorate vote. Pink background denotes a candidate elected from their party list. Yellow background denotes an electorate win by a list member, or other incumbent. A ✓ or ✗ denotes status of any incumbent, win or lose respectively.						
Party	Candidate	Votes	%	±%	Party votes	%	±%
SPD	Svenja Stadler	49,773	31.0	▲3.6	46,765	29.1	▲7.1
CDU	✗ Michael Grosse-Brömer	46,711	29.1	▼11.5	39,850	24.8	▼11.2
Greens	Nadja Weippert	24,120	15.0	▲6.0	26,777	16.7	▲6.5
FDP	Nino Ruschmeyer	14,395	9.0	▲2.5	20,426	12.7	▲1.0
AfD	Henning Schwieger	11,007	6.9	▼2.4	11,671	7.3	▼2.7
Left	Joachim Kotteck	4,230	2.6	▼2.7	4,682	2.9	▼3.4
Tierschutzpartei	Mona Jonas-Tadjik	3,561	2.2		2,360	1.5	▲0.5
FW	Willy Klingenberg	3,515	2.2	▲0.5	2,404	1.5	▲0.7
dieBasis	Christian Bahr	2,850	1.8		2,452	1.5	
PARTEI					1,193	0.7	0.0
Pirates					568	0.4	▲0.1
Team Todenhöfer					433	0.3	
Volt					347	0.2	
LKR	Hans-Christian Schröder	351	0.2		151	0.1	
ÖDP					141	0.1	0.0
NPD					138	0.1	▼0.1
Humanists					130	0.1	
V-Partei3					113	0.1	▼0.1
du.					95	0.1	
MLPD					23	0.0	0.0
DKP					23	0.0	0.0
Informal votes		1,122			893		
Total valid votes		160,513			160,742		
Turnout		161,635	80.1	▼1.2			
SPD gain from CDU	Majority	3,062	1.9				

=== 2017 election ===
Federal election (2017): Harburg
Notes:	Blue background denotes the winner of the electorate vote. Pink background denotes a candidate elected from their party list. Yellow background denotes an electorate win by a list member, or other incumbent. A ✓ or ✗ denotes status of any incumbent, win or lose respectively.						
Party	Candidate	Votes	%	±%	Party votes	%	±%
CDU	✓ Michael Grosse-Brömer	65,223	40.6	▼4.6	57,815	35.9	▼6.9
SPD	Svenja Stadler	44,017	27.4	▼4.2	35,377	22.0	▼6.3
AfD	Roderik Pfreundschuh	14,826	9.2	▲3.5	16,047	10.0	▲4.0
Greens	Nadja Weippert	14,565	9.1	▲2.0	16,410	10.2	▲0.9
FDP	Wolfgang Knobel	10,458	6.5	▲3.1	18,839	11.7	▲6.8
Left	Joachim Kotteck	8,638	5.4	▲1.8	10,117	6.3	▲1.8
FW	Timo Röntsch	2,785	1.7	▲0.7	1,340	0.8	▲0.1
Tierschutzpartei					1,632	1.0	▲0.1
PARTEI					1,238	0.8	
Pirates					475	0.3	▼1.4
NPD					358	0.2	▼0.6
V-Partei³					293	0.2	
DiB					240	0.1	
BGE					209	0.1	
DM					201	0.1	
ÖDP					198	0.1	
MLPD					35	0.0	0.0
DKP					31	0.0	
Informal votes		1,325			982		
Total valid votes		160,512			160,855		
Turnout		161,837	81.3	▲2.9			
CDU hold	Majority	21,206	13.2	▼0.4			

=== 2013 election ===
Federal election (2013): Harburg
Notes:	Blue background denotes the winner of the electorate vote. Pink background denotes a candidate elected from their party list. Yellow background denotes an electorate win by a list member, or other incumbent. A ✓ or ✗ denotes status of any incumbent, win or lose respectively.						
Party	Candidate	Votes	%	±%	Party votes	%	±%
CDU	✓ Michael Grosse-Brömer	68,458	45.2	▲4.6	64,905	42.8	▲8.8
SPD	Svenja Stadler	47,908	31.6	▲1.0	42,915	28.3	▲3.8
Greens	Martina Lammers	10,754	7.1	▼2.3	14,078	9.3	▼2.9
AfD	Bernd Lucke	8,704	5.7		9,069	6.0	
Left	Michèl Pauly	5,472	3.6	▼2.9	6,641	4.4	▼3.0
FDP	Nicole Bracht-Bendt	5,110	3.4	▼7.4	7,382	4.9	▼12.1
Pirates	Robert Geislinger	2,376	1.6		2,499	1.6	▼0.4
FW	Willy Klingenberg	1,509	1.0		1,145	0.8	
Tierschutzpartei					1,366	0.9	▲0.1
NPD	Ulrich Heim	1,112	0.7	▼0.6	1,193	1.8	▼0.3
PBC					159	0.1	
PRO					141	0.1	
REP					74	0.0	
MLPD					33	0.0	0.0
Informal votes		1,416			1,219		
Total valid votes		151,403			151,600		
Turnout		152,819	78.4	▲0.5			
CDU hold	Majority	20,550	13.6	▲3.6			

=== 2009 election ===
Federal election (2009): Harburg
Notes:	Blue background denotes the winner of the electorate vote. Pink background denotes a candidate elected from their party list. Yellow background denotes an electorate win by a list member, or other incumbent. A ✓ or ✗ denotes status of any incumbent, win or lose respectively.						
Party	Candidate	Votes	%	±%	Party votes	%	±%
CDU	Michael Grosse-Brömer	59,657	40.6	▼3.3	50,104	34.0	▼2.6
SPD	Monika Griefahn	45,002	30.6	▼11.7	36,139	24.5	▼12.3
FDP	Nicole Bracht-Bendt	15,812	10.8	▲6.4	24,967	16.9	▲5.5
Greens	Hans-Christian Friedrichs	13,772	9.4	▲4.7	18,002	12.2	▲3.5
Left	Herbert Schui	9,611	6.5	▲3.3	10,825	7.3	▲3.6
Pirates					2,963	2.0	
NPD	Sebastian Stöber	1,935	1.3	▲0.1	1,636	1.1	0.0
Tierschutzpartei					1,132	0.8	▲0.1
RRP	Richard Tiede	1,153	0.8		1,150	0.8	
ÖDP					238	0.1	
DVU					177	0.1	
MLPD					33	0.0	0.0
Informal votes		1,976			1,552		
Total valid votes		146,942			147,366		
Turnout		148,918	77.9	▼5.1			
CDU win new seat	Majority	14,655	10.0				
