= Cornell Babendererde =

German politician (born 1971)

Cornell Babendererde MdB
- Babendererde in 2026

Member of the Bundestag; for Harburg
- Incumbent
- Assumed office 25 March 2025
- Preceded by: Svenja Stadler

Personal details
- Born: 1 March 1971 (age 55) Neumünster, West Germany
- Party: Christian Democratic Union (since 2006)
- Education: University of Greifswald

Cornell-Anette Babendererde (born 1 March 1971) is a German politician from the Christian Democratic Union of Germany (CDU). She was elected as a member of the German Bundestag in the 2025 federal election.

== Early life and career ==
Cornell Babendererde grew up in Boostedt. She pursued German studies and history in Heidelberg and Greifswald and received her doctorate in 2003 from the University of Greifswald with a thesis on burial rituals in the late Middle Ages. She then worked as a human resources manager in a personnel consultancy, was a consultant and press spokesperson for the CDU parliamentary group in Hamburg, as a consultant in the economic authority and was office manager for Birgit Stöver.

== Political career ==
Cornell Babendererde has been a member of the CDU since 2006. She was elected to the city council of Winsen (Luhe) in 2006 and has been first deputy mayor since 2021. From 2014 to 2020 she was chairwoman of the CDU local association in Winsen (Luhe).

She ran for the CDU in Lower Saxony in the 2019 European elections. The CDU in the Harburg district nominated Babendererde as a direct candidate for the Harburg constituency for the 2025 German federal election. She won her constituency with 33.2% of the first vote and was thus directly elected to the Bundestag.

== Other activities ==
Babendererde is currently deputy head of the Department for Investment and Funding Management at the Lower Saxony Ministry of Economic Affairs.

== Personal life ==
Babendererde is married and lives in Winsen (Luhe).
