= Second Schröder cabinet =

German government from 2002 to 2005

Second Cabinet of Gerhard Schröder Cabinet Schröder II
- 19th Cabinet of Germany
- 22 October 2002 – 18 October 2005 (until 22 November 2005 as caretaker government)
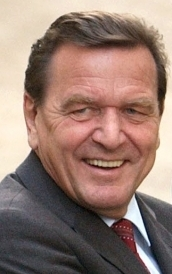
- Gerhard Schröder
- Date formed: 22 October 2002
- Date dissolved: 22 November 2005 (3 years and 1 month)

People and organisations
- President: Johannes Rau (until 30 June 2004); Horst Köhler (from 1 July 2004)
- Chancellor: Gerhard Schröder
- Vice Chancellor: Joschka Fischer
- Member party: Social Democratic Party; Alliance '90/The Greens
- Status in legislature: Red–green coalition (Majority)
- Opposition party: Christian Democratic Union; Christian Social Union; Free Democratic Party; Party of Democratic Socialism
- Opposition leader: Angela Merkel

History
- Election: 2002 federal election
- Legislature terms: 15th Bundestag
- Predecessor: Schröder I
- Successor: Merkel I

The Second Schröder cabinet (German: Kabinett Schröder II) was the 19th Government of Federal Republic of Germany, in office from 22 October 2002 until November 2005. It succeeded the First Schröder cabinet formed after the 2002 elections.

The cabinet had 13 departments, one fewer than the previous cabinet formed by Schröder. Chancellor Gerhard Schröder continued the coalition with the Alliance 90/The Greens (Greens) and his Social Democratic Party (SPD). Joschka Fischer (Greens) served as Vice Chancellor of Germany and Federal Minister of Foreign Affairs. The cabinet was succeeded by the First Merkel cabinet following the 2005 elections.

== Composition ==
Portfolio	Minister	Took office	Left office	Party
Chancellor	Gerhard Schröder	22 October 2002	22 November 2005	SPD
Vice Chancellor & Federal Minister of Foreign Affairs	Joschka Fischer	22 October 2002	22 November 2005	Greens
Federal Minister of the Interior	Otto Schily	22 October 2002	22 November 2005	SPD
Federal Minister of Justice	Brigitte Zypries	22 October 2002	22 November 2005	SPD
Federal Minister of Finance	Hans Eichel	22 October 2002	22 November 2005	SPD
Federal Ministry for Economic Affairs and Labour	Wolfgang Clement	22 October 2002	22 November 2005	SPD
Federal Minister of Food, Agriculture and Consumer Protection	Renate Künast	22 October 2002	4 October 2005	Greens
Federal Minister of Food, Agriculture and Consumer Protection	Jürgen Trittin (Acting)	4 October 2005	22 November 2005	Greens
Federal Minister of Minister for Transport, Building and Housing	Manfred Stolpe	22 October 2002	22 November 2005	SPD
Federal Minister of Defence	Peter Struck	22 October 2002	22 November 2005	SPD
Federal Minister for Family Affairs, Senior Citizens, Women and Youth	Renate Schmidt	22 October 2002	22 November 2005	SPD
Federal Minister of Health	Ulla Schmidt	22 October 2002	22 November 2005	SPD
Federal Minister for the Environment, Nature Conservation, and Nuclear Safety	Jürgen Trittin	22 October 2002	22 November 2005	Greens
Federal Minister of Education and Research	Edelgard Bulmahn	22 October 2002	22 November 2005	SPD
Federal Minister for Economic Cooperation and Development	Heidemarie Wieczorek-Zeul	22 October 2002	22 November 2005	SPD
Head of the Chancellery	Frank-Walter Steinmeier	22 October 2002	22 November 2005	SPD
