= Michael Grosse-Brömer =

German politician (born 1960)

- Grosse-Brömer in 2014

Chief Whip of the CDU/CSU Group in the Bundestag
- In office 22 May 2012 – 15 December 2021
- Leader: Volker Kauder; Ralph Brinkhaus
- Preceded by: Peter Altmaier
- Succeeded by: Thorsten Frei

Member of the Bundestag; from Lower Saxony
- In office 17 October 2002 – 25 March 2025
- Constituency: State list (2002–2009); Harburg (2009–2021); State list (2021–2025)

Personal details
- Born: 12 October 1960 (age 66) Oberhausen, West Germany
- Party: Christian Democratic Union
- Children: 2
- Education: University of Hamburg
- Occupation: Politician

Michael Grosse-Brömer (born 12 October 1960) is a German lawyer and politician of the Christian Democratic Union (CDU) who served as a member of the Bundestag from 2002 to 2025.

== Early life and education ==
Grosse-Brömer is a lawyer and civil law notary, specializing in building and architects law.

== Political career ==
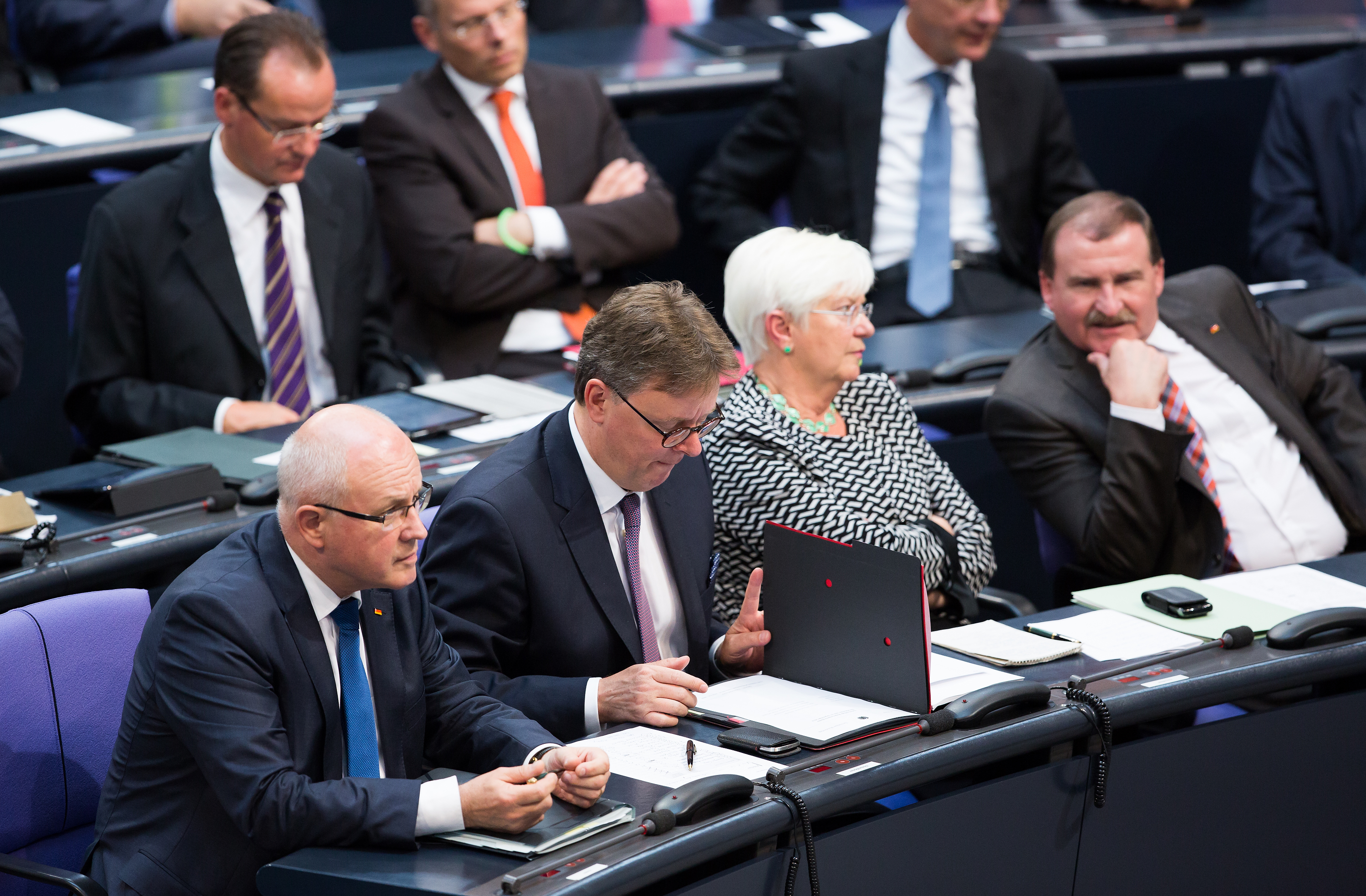
Michael Grosse-Brömer alongside Volker Kauder, Gerda Hasselfeldt and Max Straubinger at the Bundestag, 2014

Grosse-Brömer joined the CDU in 1982.

Grosse-Brömer was first elected to the Bundestag in the 2002 elections. He first served as member of the Committee on Legal Affairs and as chairman of its Sub-Committee on European Law. Between 2003 and 2004, he was one of 32 members of the Commission on the modernization of the federal state, which had been established to reform the division of powers between federal and state authorities in Germany. Within the CDU/CSU parliamentary group, Grosse-Brömer joined the leadership committee in 2006.

Following the 2009 federal elections, Grosse-Brömer assumed leadership of the Christian Democrats from Lower Saxony. In 2010 he became justicar of the parliamentary group of the CDU; before then he had served as the groups' spokesperson on legal affairs. In 2012 he succeeded Peter Altmaier as First Secretary of the parliamentary group, in this position assisting the parliamentary group's chairman Volker Kauder. In addition, he is a member of the German-Austrian Parliamentary Friendship Group and the German-Irish Parliamentary Friendship Group.

From 2009, Grosse-Brömer was also a member of the parliament's Council of Elders, which – among other duties – determines daily legislative agenda items and assigning committee chairpersons based on party representation. Since 2014, he has been serving on the Committee on the Election of Judges (Wahlausschuss), which is in charge of appointing judges to the Federal Constitutional Court of Germany. He is also a member of the parliamentary body in charge of appointing judges to the other Highest Courts of Justice, namely the Federal Court of Justice (BGH), the Federal Administrative Court (BVerwG), the Federal Fiscal Court (BFH), the Federal Labour Court (BAG), and the Federal Social Court (BSG).

Following the 2013 federal elections, Grosse-Brömer was part of the CDU/CSU team in the negotiations with the SPD on a coalition agreement. In the negotiations to form a coalition government with the Christian Social Union in Bavaria (CSU), the Free Democratic Party (FDP) and the Green Party following the 2017 national elections, he was part of the 19-member delegation of the CDU.

Following his party's defeat in the 2021 elections, Grosse-Brömer announced his candidacy as Vice President of the Bundestag; however, the CDU/CSU parliamentary group eventually nominated Yvonne Magwas for the position. Since then, he has been serving as chair of the Committee on Economic Affairs.

In April 2024, Grosse-Brömer announced that he would not stand in the 2025 federal elections but instead resign from active politics by the end of the parliamentary term.

== Political positions ==
=== Social issues ===
Following a 2013 decision by the Federal Constitutional Court of Germany, which ruled that gays and lesbians should be allowed to adopt children already adopted by their partners, Grosse-Brömer told German daily Süddeutsche Zeitung that as a result of the "clear tendency in the decisions of the Federal Constitutional Court, we should move as quickly as possible to implement the necessary constitutional right of equality." Grosse-Brömer later devised a compromise on legally binding rules to ensure more women sit on corporate boards after some of his parliamentary group's lawmakers, led by Labor Minister Ursula von der Leyen, threatened to vote for the opposition-sponsored proposal to reserve as many as 40 percent of board seats for women. Under the agreement, at least 30 percent of the supervisory board of publicly traded companies must be reserved for women from 2020.

=== Economic policy ===
In a 2013 German debate about moving towards tighter regulation of executive pay, Grosse-Brömer expressed his hope that transparency and shareholder scrutiny would be enough to put a stop to pay excesses and rejected a legal cap on payouts. Speaking on plans to create a Transatlantic Trade and Investment Partnership in 2014, he told the Financial Times that "[t]he biggest advantage is that when the EU and the US make this deal, it will include standards which can be applied worldwide."

=== Foreign policy ===
In the debate on international sanctions during the 2014 pro-Russian unrest in Ukraine, Grosse-Brömer supported tighter measures, saying said it was "right" to push for more sanctions on Russia and that "sanctions that have been held out must also be implemented." On Ukraine's president Petro Poroshenko's 2014 plan to hold a referendum on his country joining NATO, Grosse-Brömer swiftly commented: "NATO membership for Ukraine isn't on the agenda at this point."

== Other activities ==
Grosse-Brömer sits on the advisory board of Wuppertal-based insurer Barmenia Versicherungen.

== See also ==
- List of German Christian Democratic Union politicians
