= Stop the Bomb =

Stop the Bomb is a non-governmental organization based in Berlin, Germany, that seeks to prevent Iran from acquiring nuclear weapons. To advance this goal, the group promotes tougher sanctions on Iran and further economic and diplomatic isolation of the Iranian government. The group has pressured public German and Austrian companies such as Siemens to end their business in Iran by buying shares in these companies and then speaking out at company board meetings.
