= Svenja Stadler =

German politician

Svenja Stadler MdB
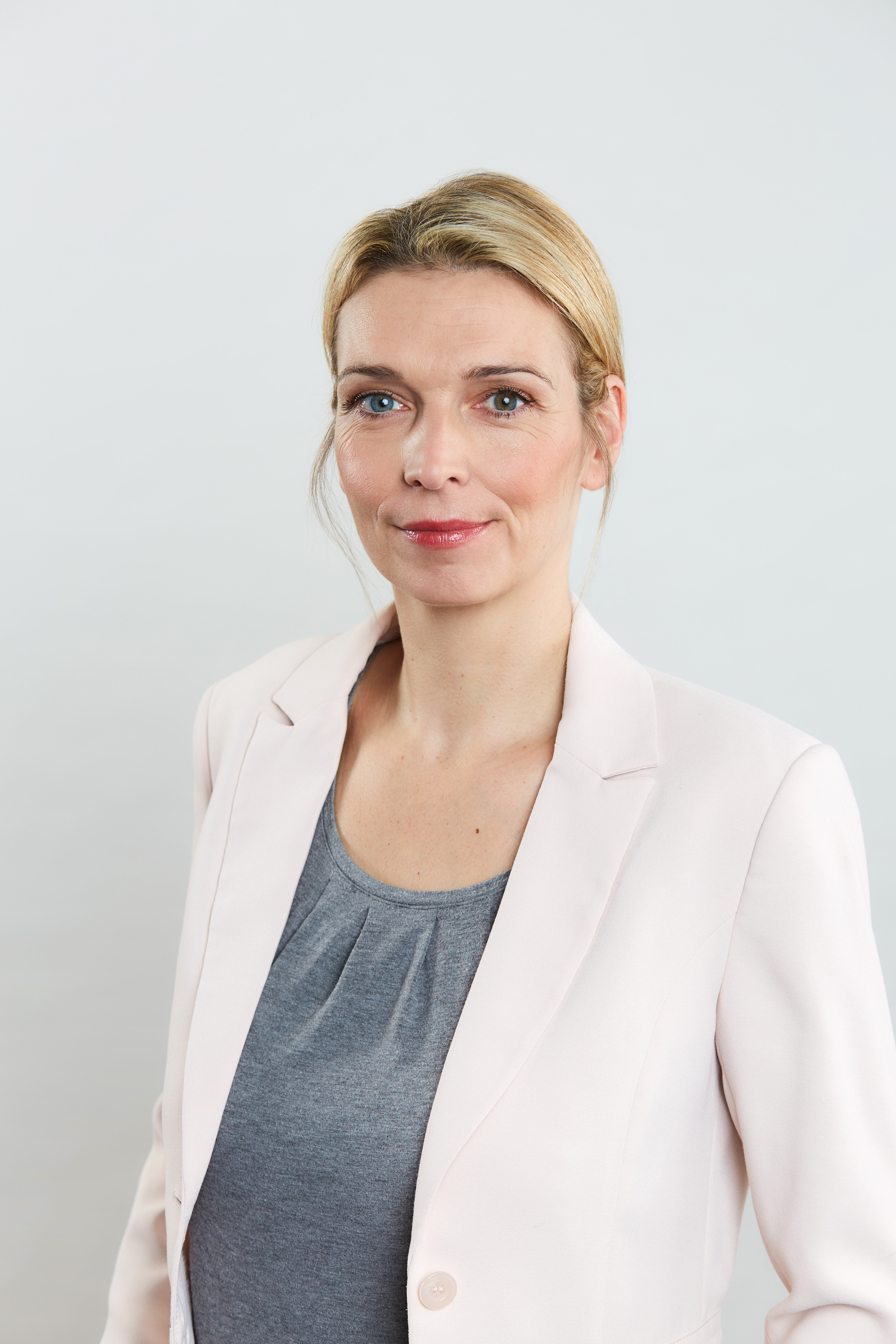
- Stadler in 2019

Member of the Bundestag; from Lower Saxony
- Incumbent
- Assumed office 22 October 2013
- Constituency: State list (2013–2021); Harburg (2021–2025); State list (2025–present)

Personal details
- Born: 26 August 1976 (age 50) Oldenburg, West Germany
- Party: Social Democratic
- Children: 2

Svenja Stadler (born 26 August 1976) is a German politician of the Social Democratic Party (SPD) who has been serving as a member of the Bundestag from the state of Lower Saxony since 2013.

== Political career ==
Stadler became a member of the Bundestag in the 2013 German federal election. She is a member of the Committee for Family, Senior Citizens, Women and Youth and of the Subcommittee on Civic Involvement. An alternate member of the Budget Committee, she also serves as her parliamentary group's rapporteur on the annual budgets of the Federal Ministry of Family Affairs, Senior Citizens, Women and Youth and the Federal Ministry of Health (since 2021).

Within the SPD parliamentary group, Stadler belongs to the Parliamentary Left, a left-wing movement.

== Other activities ==
- German Foundation for Active Citizenship and Volunteering (DSEE), Member of the Board of Trustees (since 2020)
- Business Forum of the Social Democratic Party of Germany, Member of the Political Advisory Board (since 2020)
- Müttergenesungswerk, Chairwoman of the Board of Trustees
- German Red Cross (DRK), Member
- Lions Clubs International, Member
