= Nadja Weippert =

German politician (born 1982)

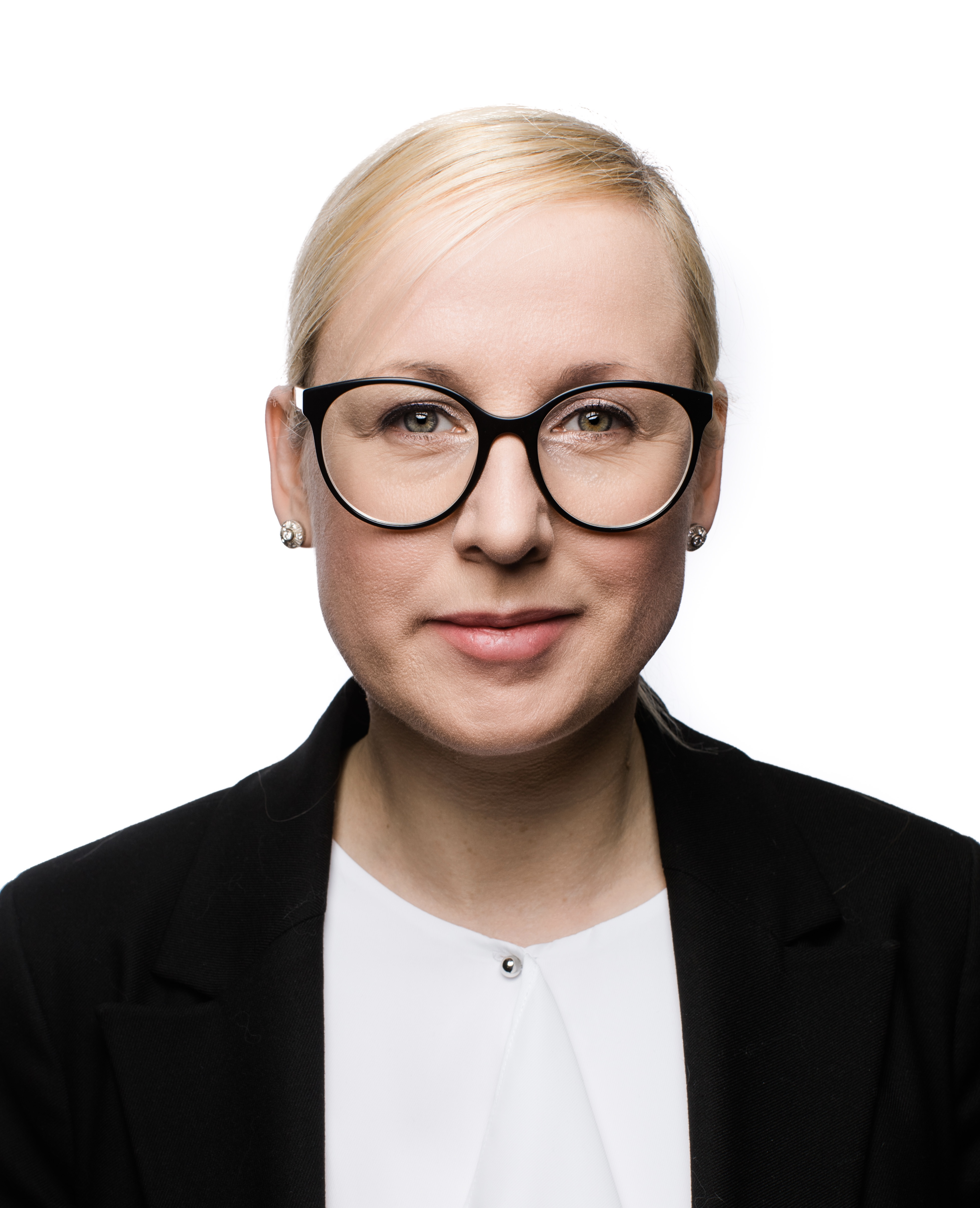
- Weippert in 2020

Member of the Landtag of Lower Saxony
- Incumbent
- Assumed office 8 November 2022

Personal details
- Born: 29 December 1982 (age 43)
- Party: Alliance 90/The Greens (since 2015)

Nadja Weippert (born 29 December 1982) is a German politician serving as a member of the Landtag of Lower Saxony since 2022. She has served as mayor of Tostedt since 2021.
