= Renate Künast =

German politician (born 1955)

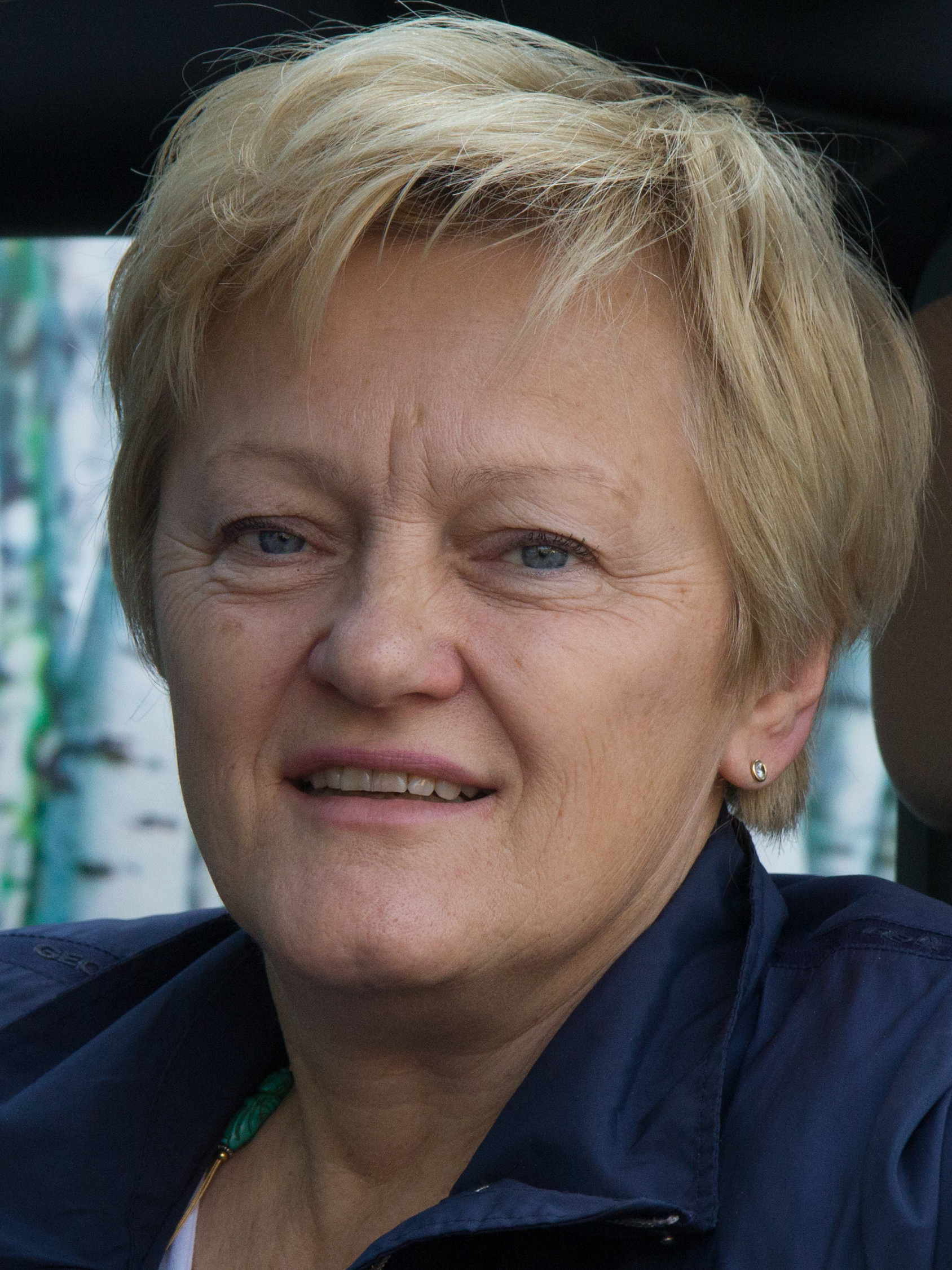
- Künast in 2017

Leader of the Alliance 90/The Greens in the Bundestag
- In office 4 October 2005 – 8 October 2013 Serving with Fritz Kuhn and Jürgen Trittin
- Chief Whip: Volker Beck
- Preceded by: Katrin Göring-Eckardt
- Succeeded by: Katrin Göring-Eckardt

Minister of Food, Agriculture and Consumer Protection
- In office 12 January 2001 – 4 October 2005
- Chancellor: Gerhard Schröder
- Preceded by: Karl-Heinz Funke
- Succeeded by: Jürgen Trittin (Acting)

Leader of the Alliance 90/The Greens
- In office 23 June 2000 – 9 March 2001 Serving with Fritz Kuhn
- Preceded by: Gunda Röstel
- Succeeded by: Claudia Roth

Member of the Bundestag for Berlin
- In office 22 September 2002 – 25 March 2025
- Constituency: Alliance 90/The Greens

Member of the Abgeordnetenhaus of Berlin
- In office 19 January 1989 – 25 June 2000
- Constituency: Alliance 90/The Greens
- In office 10 March 1985 – 20 April 1987
- Constituency: Alternative List

Personal details
- Born: 15 December 1955 (age 70) Recklinghausen, West Germany
- Party: German: Alliance '90/The Greens; EU: The Greens–European Free Alliance
- Education: Fachhochschule Düsseldorf; Free University of Berlin
- Occupation: Attorney

Renate Elly Künast (born 15 December 1955) is a German politician of the Alliance 90/The Greens party. She was the Minister of Consumer Protection, Food and Agriculture from 2001 to 2005 and subsequently served as chairwoman of her party's parliamentary group in the Bundestag.

== Early life and career ==
Künast was born in Recklinghausen, North Rhine-Westphalia. She studied social work in Düsseldorf and worked from 1977 to 1979 in this profession in a jailhouse in Berlin. After that she studied law at the Free University of Berlin until 1985. During her student years, she often protested against the Gorleben nuclear-fuel reprocessing plant. She later worked as lawyer specializing on aliens law and criminal law.

== Political career ==
=== Career in state politics ===
Since 1979, Künast has been a member of the German Green Party (Bündnis 90/Die Grünen), first in the Alternative List in West Berlin. In the 1990s she was member of parliament and chairwoman of the Green Party's group in the state parliament of Berlin. During that time, she won cross-party respect for her leading role in drafting a new democratic constitution for the reunified city-state. Künast eventually became the party's spokeswoman for legal issues. In 1998, she re-assumed the floor leadership post alongside Michaele Schreyer.

In national politics, Künast came to be known as a tough negotiator for her work in drafting the national red-green coalition agreement after the 1998 federal parliamentary elections. In October 1999, she was the Green' front-runner in Berlin's state elections.

From June 2000 to March 2001, Künast served as co-chair of Bündnis 90/Die Grünen on the national level, together with Fritz Kuhn.

=== Minister for Food, Agriculture and Consumer Protection, 2001–2005 ===
Künast became Minister for Food, Agriculture and Consumer Protection in the second government of Germany Gerhard Schröder in 2001. Since her party at the time did not allow the combination of functions in the party and the government in one person, she had to resign from her role as the party's co-chair.

By naming someone with no experience in farming to head a ministry with such sweeping powers, Schröder was widely considered gambling that any loss of support among farmers would be more than compensated by support from ecologically conscious Germans alarmed by the discovery of mad cow disease.

Künast held the office of Minister for Food, Agriculture and Consumer Protection until 2005, over time becoming known for increasing consumer protection, supporting organic farming, and expanding animal welfare. During her time in office, she ranked behind only Schröder and Foreign Minister Joschka Fischer in public opinion polls.

=== Member of the German Parliament, 2002–2025 ===
Following the 2002 elections, Künast was part of the Green Party's team in the negotiations with the Social Democrats on a coalition agreement for the second government under the leadership of Chancellor Gerhard Schröder.

After the 2005 federal election, Künast became co-chair of the Green Party's parliamentary group, initially together with Fritz Kuhn and later with Jürgen Trittin. In the 2005 vote, she won against Trittin and Katrin Göring-Eckardt. Also since 2005, she has been serving on the Committee on the Election of Judges (Wahlausschuss), which is in charge of appointing judges to the Federal Constitutional Court of Germany.

Künast announced on 5 November 2010 that she we would be the candidate for Governing Mayor of Berlin for Alliance 90/The Greens in the 2011 Berlin state election. At the time of the announcement, her party was eight percentage points ahead of the Social Democrats in the opinion polls. Under her leadership, the Green Party came third with 17.6 percent of the vote, ten percentage points behind the Social Democrates but still up from the 13.1 percent they won in the previous election. However, incumbent Klaus Wowereit from the Social Democrats chose to enter a coalition with the conservative CDU, leaving Künast without any role in Berlin state politics.

Ahead of the 2013 elections, Künast announced her candidacy to lead the Green Party's campaign. In an internal vote, she ultimately lost against Katrin Göring-Eckardt and Jürgen Trittin.

After the 2013 elections, the resignation of Künast and Trittin as co-leaders of the Green Party's group in parliament cleared the way for the election of Göring-Eckardt and Anton Hofreiter. Instead, Künast unsuccessfully ran against Claudia Roth for the office of Vice President of the German Bundestag. She eventually served as chairwoman of the Committee on Legal Affairs and Consumer Protection from 2014 until 2017. Since 2018, she has been a member of the Committee on Food and Agriculture.

In the negotiations to form a so-called traffic light coalition of the Social Democrats (SPD), the Green Party and the FDP following the 2021 federal elections, Künast led her party's delegation in the working group on agriculture and nutrition; her co-chairs from the other parties are Till Backhaus and Carina Konrad.

In July 2024, Künast announced that she would not stand in the 2025 federal elections but instead resign from active politics by the end of the parliamentary term.

== Other activities ==
=== Corporate boards ===
- KfW, Ex-Officio Member of the Board of Supervisory Directors (2003-2005)

=== Non-profit organizations ===
- Stiftung Forum Recht, Member of the Board of Trustees (since 2022)
- Alice Salomon University of Applied Sciences, Member of the Board of Trustees
- Association of German Foundations, Member of the Parliamentary Advisory Board
- German Forum for Crime Prevention (DFK), Member of the Board of Trustees
- German Foundation for International Legal Cooperation (IRZ), Member of the Board of Trustees
- Humanist Union, Member

In addition, Künast serves on the board of trustees of the Berlin-based AIDS-Hilfe (AIDS-Help) group, and is an honorary member of the International Raoul Wallenberg Foundation and the Angelo Roncalli Committee within that organization.

== Political positions ==
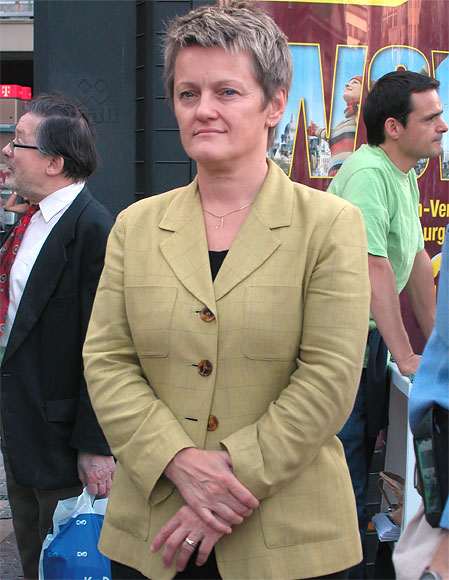
Künast in 2006

=== Human rights ===
In 2010, Künast criticized Chancellor Angela Merkel for speaking at an award ceremony for Danish cartoonist Kurt Westergaard in Potsdam, arguing that while it was true that the right to freedom of expression also applies to Westergaard's controversial Muhammad cartoons "if a chancellor also makes a speech on top of that, it serves to heat up the debate."

In August 2012, Künast was one of 124 members of the Bundestag to sign a letter that was sent to the Russian ambassador to Germany, Vladimir Grinin, expressing concern over the trial against the three members of Pussy Riot. "Being held in detention for months and the threat of lengthy punishment are draconian and disproportionate", the lawmakers said in the letter. "In a secular and pluralist state, peaceful artistic acts -- even if they can be seen as provocative -- must not lead to the accusation of serious criminal acts that lead to lengthy prison terms."

In 2015, Künast was the initiator of a bill in favor of legalizing assisted suicide, arguing that "a punishment of commercial euthanasia would expose doctors to the severe risk of legal investigations." However, the Bundestag later voted to criminalize organizations that assist patients seeking to terminate their lives in return for payment and makes assisting a suicide punishable by up to three years in prison.

=== Economic policy ===
Amid the 2008 financial crisis, Künast proposed to solve the state-owned banks' financial woes and to merge the Germany's then eight regional banks into one institution, which would concentrate on regional economic development. In a 2008 interview with newspaper Welt am Sonntag: "The regional banks should be merged into one and their functions need to be clearly laid out." Ahead of the 2009 federal elections, in an attempt to come up with an antidote to the other political parties' hijacking of green ideas, Künast and her fellow lead candidate Jürgen Trittin backed up their critique of incumbent Chancellor Angela Merkel's government with a "Green New Deal", calling for €20 billion ($27.4 billion) a year to be invested in climate protection, environmental technology and education.

=== Speech on digital platforms ===
Künast sued Facebook in response to insults against her posted on the social media platform in 2019, many of which were of a sexist or violent nature, seeking user data of those who posted the comments. The Landgericht Berlin, a regional court, initially ruled that the information only had to be provided for 6 of the 22 comments. An appeal to the Kammergericht increased this number to ten. In a final appeal, the Federal Constitutional Court ruled that user data for all 22 comments had to be provided to Künast.

=== Animal welfare ===
In 2013, Künast criticized factory farming, arguing that it consisted of animal cruelty and a misuse of antibiotics.

=== Consumer protection ===
In 2010, Künast called for a ban on advertising for sweets aimed at children.

=== Relations with the CDU ===
Over the course of her career, Künast has regularly dismissed prospects for an alternative coalition between the Greens and Angela Merkel's Christian Democratic Union on a national level.

== Recognition ==
In 2010, Künast – along with Cécile Duflot, Monica Frassoni, and Marina Silva – was named by Foreign Policy magazine to its list of top global thinkers, for taking Green mainstream.

== Personal life ==
Künast has been married to lawyer Rüdiger Portius since 2011. From 2001, she shared an apartment with Katrin Göring-Eckardt in Berlin’s Friedenau district.

== Controversies ==
=== Antisemitism ===
In July 2009, Künast was accused of antisemitism by the Jerusalem Post, after she had allegedly been overheard calling the pro-Israel "Stop the Bomb" organisation a "Mossad front", which she denied.

=== Domestic security ===
In October 2015, Künast advised the police officer Tania Kambouri during a talk show that the police should take their shoes off before raids in mosques. Kambouri had published a book about her experience with the rising violence by Muslim men against law enforcement and especially against women.

In July 2016, Künast posted a Tweet in which she questioned the shooting of an Afghan refugee and ISIS sympathiser who severely injured five people with an axe. She was criticized for publicly accusing the police of wrongdoing without knowing the details and before the official investigation was started. Members from her party distanced themselves from the statement and said that they trusted the German police. Police union chief Rainier Wendt called her a "parliamentary smart aleck".

== Bibliography ==
- Die Dickmacher. Warum die Deutschen immer fetter werden und was wir dagegen tun müssen. Riemann Verlag, 2004, ISBN 3-570-50062-4.
- Klasse statt Masse. Die Erde schätzen, den Verbraucher schützen. Econ Ullstein List Verlag, München 2002.
- Der Mordfall Schmücker und der Verfassungs„schutz". Dokumentation seit dem 29. September 1986, vorgelegt von Renate Künast (MdA), Februar 1987. Alternative Liste für Demokratie und Umweltschutz, Fraktion des Abgeordnetenhauses von Berlin, 1987.
