= Karl-Heinz Funke =

German politician

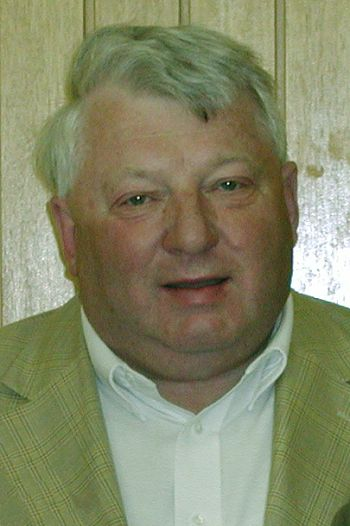
- Funke in 2006

Minister of Food, Agriculture and Consumer Protection
- In office 27 October 1998 – 12 January 2001
- Chancellor: Gerhard Schröder
- Preceded by: Jochen Borchert
- Succeeded by: Renate Künast

Minister of Food, Agriculture and Forests for the Landtag of Lower Saxony
- In office 21 June 1990 – 27 October 1998

Personal details
- Born: 29 April 1946 (age 80) Oldenburg District, Lower Saxony, Germany
- Party: Social Democratic Party of Germany (until 2011)
- Education: University of Hamburg
- Occupation: teacher

Karl-Heinz Funke (born 29 April 1946) is a German politician. From 1998 to 2001, he served as the Minister of Food and Agriculture of Germany in the First Schröder cabinet.

== Personal life ==
Funke was born on 29 April 1946 in Dangast, part of the Oldenburg District of Lower Saxony. After performing his military service, he studied at the University of Hamburg and later taught at a school in Varel.

== Political career ==
In 1972, he was elected to the city council in Varel and, in 1978, was elected to the Landtag of Lower Saxony. In 1990, Funke's Social Democratic Party won the state elections, which brought future-Chancellor, Gerhard Schröder, into power as the Minister President of Lower Saxony. Schröder tapped Funke as his state Minister of Food, Agriculture and Forests, where he served until 1998.

In the 1998 German federal election, Schröder and the SPD were the largest party in the German Bundestag. Schröder took power as the Chancellor and appointed Funke to the position of Federal Minister Federal Minister of Food, Agriculture and Forestry.

Funke resigned from the government on 12 January 2001 after an outbreak of Bovine spongiform encephalopathy (BSE) in German cattle herds. Funke had originally made public statements that German farms had not been afflicted by the disease. The Federal Minister of Health, Andrea Fischer, also resigned because of the crisis.

He was forced to resign from the SPD in 2011 after founding a local electoral group called Zukunft Varel that would compete against the SPD, which, under the party's bylaws, was a forbidden activity. Funke was later elected to the municipal council with new new election organization.

== Legal issues ==
Funke later was appointed as the head of the Oldenburg-East Frisian Water Association, the local drinking water collective. In 2009, Funke resigned from the association after allegations that he had used 8,000 euros of the company's funds to pay the costs of his silver wedding anniversary ceremony. In 2011, he faced a trial for embezzlement and also charged him with unlawfully increasing the salary of the association’s managing director from 117,000 euros annually to 270,000 euros. Further, the prosecutors alleged that he made payments without approval to employees that totaled 1.2 million euros.

In 2012, he was acquitted of charges that he used the association's funds for his wedding anniversary, but found guilty of increasing the manager's salary without authorization. The prosecutors had asked the court for a sentence of 10 months probation and a 10,000 euro fine; however, the court sentenced Funke to a suspended six-month sentence and a 10,000 euro fine. The acquittal was overturned by the Federal Court of Justice in 2013 and Funke ultimately paid a fine of 2,000 euros to settle the case.
