= Federal Ministry for the Environment, Climate Action, Nature Conservation and Nuclear Safety =

Federal ministry of Germany

Federal Ministry for the Environment, Climate Action, Nature Conservation and Nuclear Safety (BMUKN)
- Bundesministerium für Umwelt, Klimaschutz, Naturschutz und nukleare Sicherheit

Agency overview
- Formed: 6 June 1986 (40 years ago)
- Jurisdiction: Government of Germany
- Headquarters: Robert-Schuman-Platz 3, 53175 Bonn, Germany
- Employees: 814
- Annual budget: €2.657 billion (2021)
- Minister responsible: Carsten Schneider, Federal Environmental Minister
- Agency executives: Jochen Flasbarth, State Secretary; Nikolai Fichtner, Spokesperson
- Child agencies: Federal Environmental Agency; Federal Agency for Nature Conservation; Federal Office for Radiation Protection
- Website: www.bmuv.de

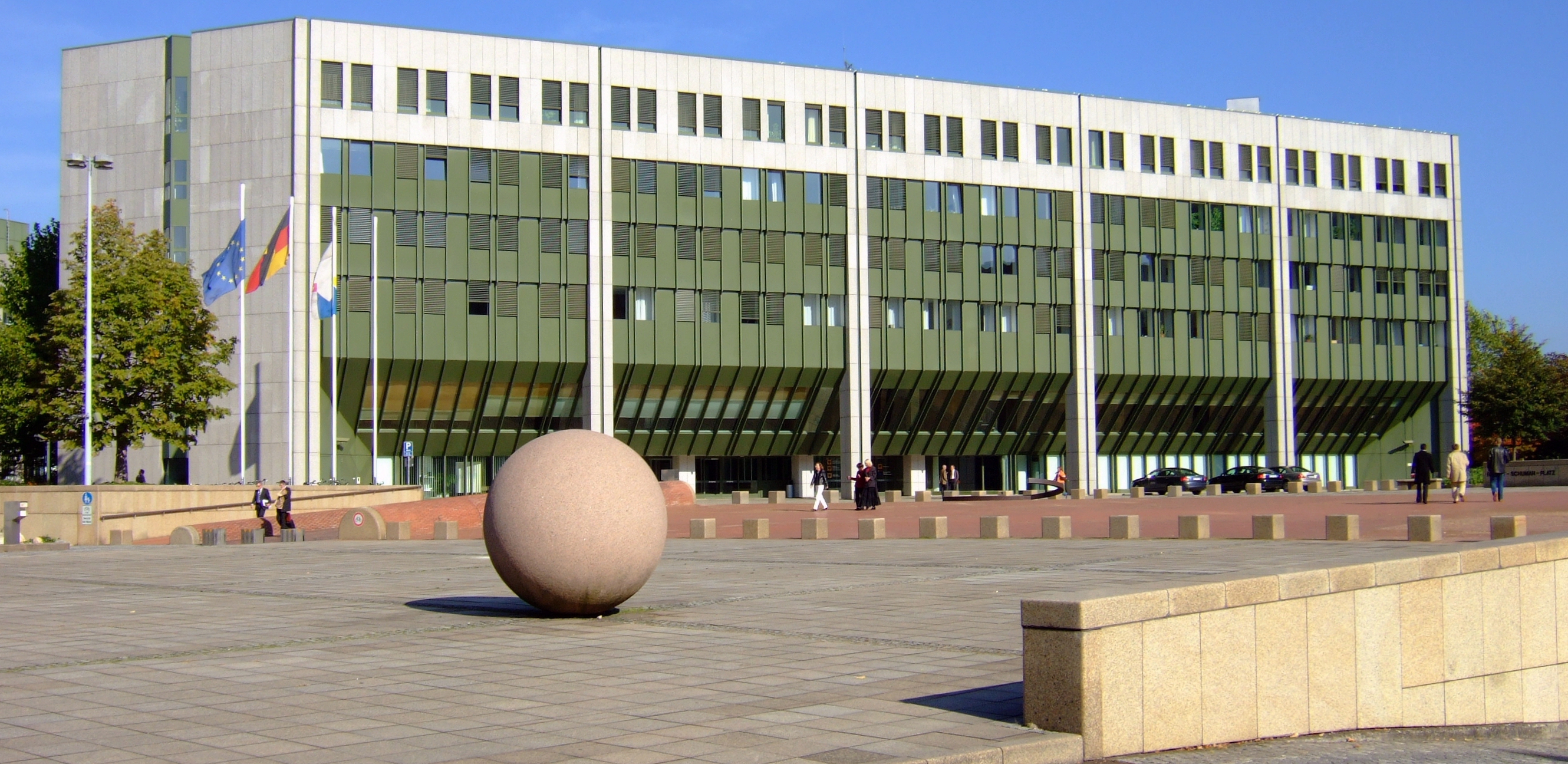
Headquarters in Bonn

The Federal Ministry for the Environment, Climate Action, Nature Conservation and Nuclear Safety (German: Bundesministerium für Umwelt, Klimaschutz, Naturschutz und nukleare Sicherheit; abbreviated BMUKN) is a cabinet-level ministry of the Federal Republic of Germany. It has branches in Bonn and Berlin.

The ministry was established on 6 June 1986 in response to the Chernobyl disaster. The then Federal Government wanted to combine environmental authority under a new minister in order to face new environmental challenges more effectively. Furthermore The Greens had been formed a few years prior in part as an anti-nuclear environmentalist party and had achieved federal representation in 1983 and Joschka Fischer had been appointed minister of the environment for Hesse the previous year, marking the first state level red-green coalition in Germany. Thus the CDU/CSU intended to project a message of taking the environment seriously in an era in which the Greens were widely perceived as the only party with a policy focus on environmental issues, notwithstanding the fact that CSU-led Bavaria had had a state environment minister since 1971 and the FDP was the first to pass an environment-related plank in the party platform in 1971. Prior to the establishment of the ministry of the environment, responsibilities for environmental issues were distributed among the ministries of the Interior, Agriculture and Health.

== Functions ==
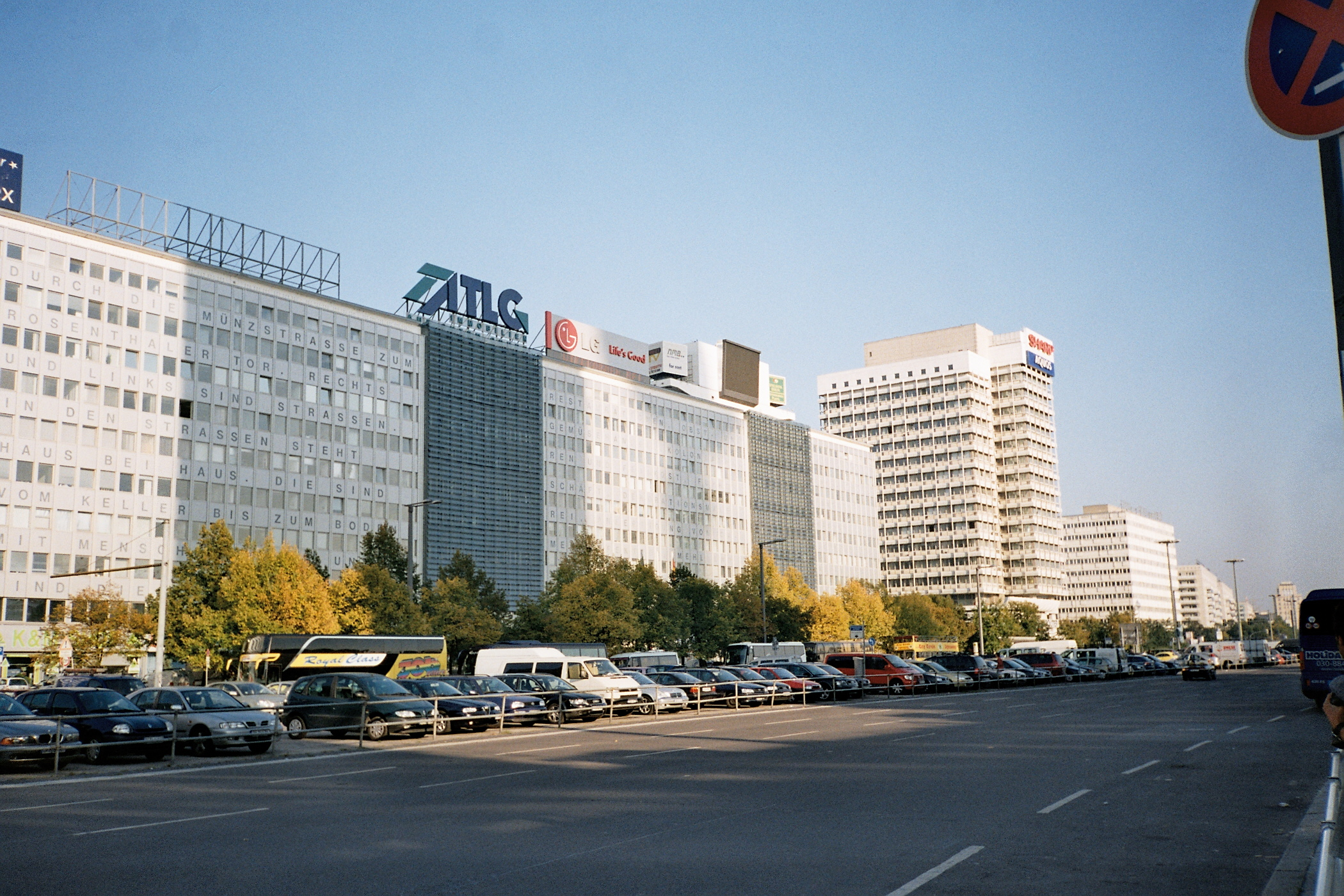
Seat in Berlin on Alexanderplatz

The ministry's primary functions include:

- Fundamental national environmental policy
- Informing and educating the public about environmental issues
- Environmental remediation and development in Eastern Germany
- Climate protection and energy
- Air quality control
- Noise abatement
- Conservation of groundwater, rivers, lakes and seas
- Soil conservation and remediation of contaminated sites
- Waste management and recycling policy
- Chemicals safety, environment and health
- Precautions against emergencies in industrial plants
- Protection, maintenance and sustainable utilization of biodiversity
- Safety of nuclear facilities
- Nuclear supply and disposal
- Radiological protection

== Organization ==
The ministry is led by the Minister for the Environment, Nature Conservation and Nuclear Safety. The current Minister is Steffi Lemke, appointed by Chancellor Olaf Scholz. The minister is supported by two parliamentary state secretaries (members of the cabinet and federal government, "deputy ministers") and two career state secretaries (public servants) who manage the ministry's nine directorates:

- "Z" directorate (Abteilung Z) is the central office responsible for internal affairs
- "G" directorate (Abteilung G) is the central office responsible for policy and collaboration
- "KI" directorate (Abteilung KI): climate and international cooperation
- "S" directorate (Abteilung S): radiation protection, nuclear safety, nuclear supply and radioactive waste
- "WR" directorate (Abteilung WR): water management, waste management, soil conservation and contamination
- "IG" directorate (Abteilung IG): air pollution, health impacts, environment and traffic, hazardous locations and materials
- "N" directorate (Abteilung N): conservation and species richness, genetic engineering, environmental impacts of agriculture and forestry

== Federal Environment Ministers ==
Political Party: CDU Green SPD

Name (Born-Died)		Portrait	Party	Term of Office		Chancellor (Cabinet)
Federal Minister for the Environment, Nature Conservation, and Reactor Safety
1	Walter Wallmann (1932–2013)		CDU	6 June 1986	22 April 1987	Kohl (II)
2	Klaus Töpfer (1938–2024)		CDU	7 May 1987	17 November 1994	Kohl (III • IV)
3	Angela Merkel (born 1954)		CDU	17 November 1994	27 October 1998	Kohl (V)
4	Jürgen Trittin (born 1954)		Green	27 October 1998	22 November 2005	Schröder (I • II)
5	Sigmar Gabriel (born 1959)		SPD	22 November 2005	28 October 2009	Merkel (I)
6	Norbert Röttgen (born 1965)		CDU	28 October 2009	22 May 2012	Merkel (II)
7	Peter Altmaier (born 1958)		CDU	22 May 2012	17 December 2013	Merkel (II)
Federal Minister for the Environment, Nature Conservation, Housing, and Reactor Safety
8	Barbara Hendricks (born 1952)		SPD	17 December 2013	14 March 2018	Merkel (III)
Federal Minister for the Environment, Nature Conservation, and Nuclear Safety
9	Svenja Schulze (born 1968)		SPD	14 March 2018	8 December 2021	Merkel (IV)
Federal Minister for the Environment, Nature Conservation, Nuclear Safety and Consumer Protection
10	Steffi Lemke (born 1968)		Green	8 December 2021	6 May 2025	Scholz (I)
Federal Minister for the Environment, Climate Action, Nature Conservation and Nuclear Safety
11	Carsten Schneider (born 1976)		SPD	6 May 2025	Incumbent	Merz (I)

== See also ==
- Bundesamt für Strahlenschutz
- Nuclear phase-out#Germany
- Nuclear power in Germany
- World Nuclear Industry Status Report
