= Johanna-Sebus-Gymnasium =

Closed school in Kleve, Germany

Location
- Kleve, North Rhine-Westphalia; Germany
- Coordinates: 51°46′49″N 6°07′23″E

Information
- Opened: 1935
- Closed: 2010

The Johanna-Sebus-Gymnasium was a school in the city of Kleve which closed in 2010 due to low enrollment. It merged with Freiherr-vom-Stein-Gymnasium. The school was founded in 1935. Up until 1978 the school was a girls school.
