= First Schröder cabinet =

German government from 1998 to 2002

First Cabinet of Gerhard Schröder Cabinet Schröder I
- 18th Cabinet of the Federal Republic of Germany
- 27 October 1998 – 17 October 2002 (until 22 October 2002 as caretaker government)
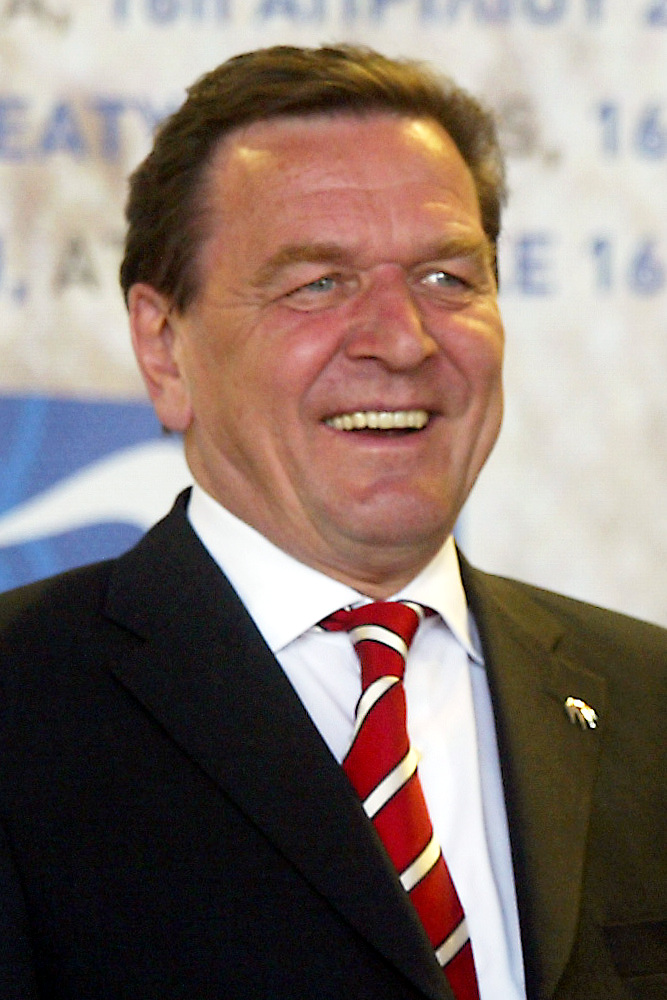
- Gerhard Schröder
- Date formed: 27 October 1998
- Date dissolved: 22 October 2002 (3 years, 11 months, 3 weeks and 4 days)

People and organisations
- President: Roman Herzog (until 30 June 1999); Johannes Rau (from 1 July 1999)
- Chancellor: Gerhard Schröder
- Vice-Chancellor: Joschka Fischer
- Member party: Social Democratic Party; Alliance '90/The Greens
- Status in legislature: Coalition government
- Opposition party: Christian Democratic Union; Christian Social Union; Free Democratic Party; Party of Democratic Socialism
- Opposition leader: Wolfgang Schäuble (until 29 February 2000); Friedrich Merz (from 29. Februar 2000 to 24. September 2002); Angela Merkel (from 24 September 2002)

History
- Election: 1998 federal election
- Legislature terms: 14th Bundestag
- Predecessor: Kohl V
- Successor: Schröder II

The First Schröder cabinet (German: Kabinett Schröder I) was the 19th Government of Federal Republic of Germany in office from 27 October 1998 until 22 October 2002. It succeeded the Fifth Kohl cabinet formed after the 1998 elections. Gerhard Schröder, Minister President of Lower Saxony, reached an agreement on a coalition with the Alliance 90/The Greens (Greens) and his Social Democratic Party (SPD), setting the stage for Schröder to become Chancellor of Germany. Joschka Fischer (Greens) replaced Klaus Kinkel (FDP) as Vice-Chancellor of Germany and Federal Minister of Foreign Affairs. The cabinet was succeeded by the Second Schröder cabinet.

== Composition ==
Within the red-green coalition cabinet, the SPD controlled the posts overseeing finance, the economy, and welfare issues.

Portfolio	Minister	Took office	Left office	Party
Chancellor	Gerhard Schröder	27 October 1998	22 October 2002	SPD
Vice-Chancellor & Federal Minister of Foreign Affairs	Joschka Fischer	27 October 1998	22 October 2002	Greens
Federal Minister of the Interior	Otto Schily	27 October 1998	22 October 2002	SPD
Federal Minister of Justice	Herta Däubler-Gmelin	27 October 1998	22 October 2002	SPD
Federal Minister of Finance	Oskar Lafontaine	27 October 1998	11 March 1999	SPD
Federal Minister of Finance	Werner Müller (Acting)	11 March 1999	12 April 1999	Independent
Federal Minister of Finance	Hans Eichel	12 April 1999	22 October 2002	SPD
Federal Ministry for Economics and Technology	Werner Müller	27 October 1998	22 October 2002	Independent
Federal Minister of Food, Agriculture and Consumer Protection	Karl-Heinz Funke	27 October 1998	12 January 2001	SPD
Federal Minister of Food, Agriculture and Consumer Protection	Renate Künast	12 January 2001	22 October 2002	Greens
Federal Minister of Labour and Social Affairs	Walter Riester	27 October 1998	22 October 2002	SPD
Federal Minister of Defence	Rudolf Scharping	27 October 1998	19 July 2002	SPD
Federal Minister of Defence	Peter Struck	19 July 2002	22 October 2002	SPD
Federal Minister for Family Affairs, Senior Citizens, Women and Youth	Christine Bergmann	27 October 1998	22 October 2002	SPD
Federal Minister of Health	Andrea Fischer	27 October 1998	12 January 2001	Greens
Federal Minister of Health	Ulla Schmidt	12 January 2001	22 October 2002	SPD
Federal Minister of Transport, Building and Urban Affairs	Franz Müntefering	27 October 1998	29 September 1999	SPD
Federal Minister of Transport, Building and Urban Affairs	Reinhard Klimmt	29 September 1999	20 November 2000	SPD
Federal Minister of Transport, Building and Urban Affairs	Kurt Bodewig	20 November 2000	22 October 2002	SPD
Federal Minister for the Environment, Nature Conservation, and Nuclear Safety	Jürgen Trittin	27 October 1998	22 October 2002	Greens
Federal Minister of Education and Research	Edelgard Bulmahn	27 October 1998	22 October 2002	SPD
Federal Minister for Economic Cooperation and Development	Heidemarie Wieczorek-Zeul	27 October 1998	22 October 2002	SPD
Federal Minister for Special Tasks & Head of the Chancellery	Bodo Hombach	27 October 1998	7 July 1999	SPD
Head of the Chancellery	Frank-Walter Steinmeier	7 July 1999	22 October 2002	SPD
