= Jürgen Trittin =

German politician (born 1954)

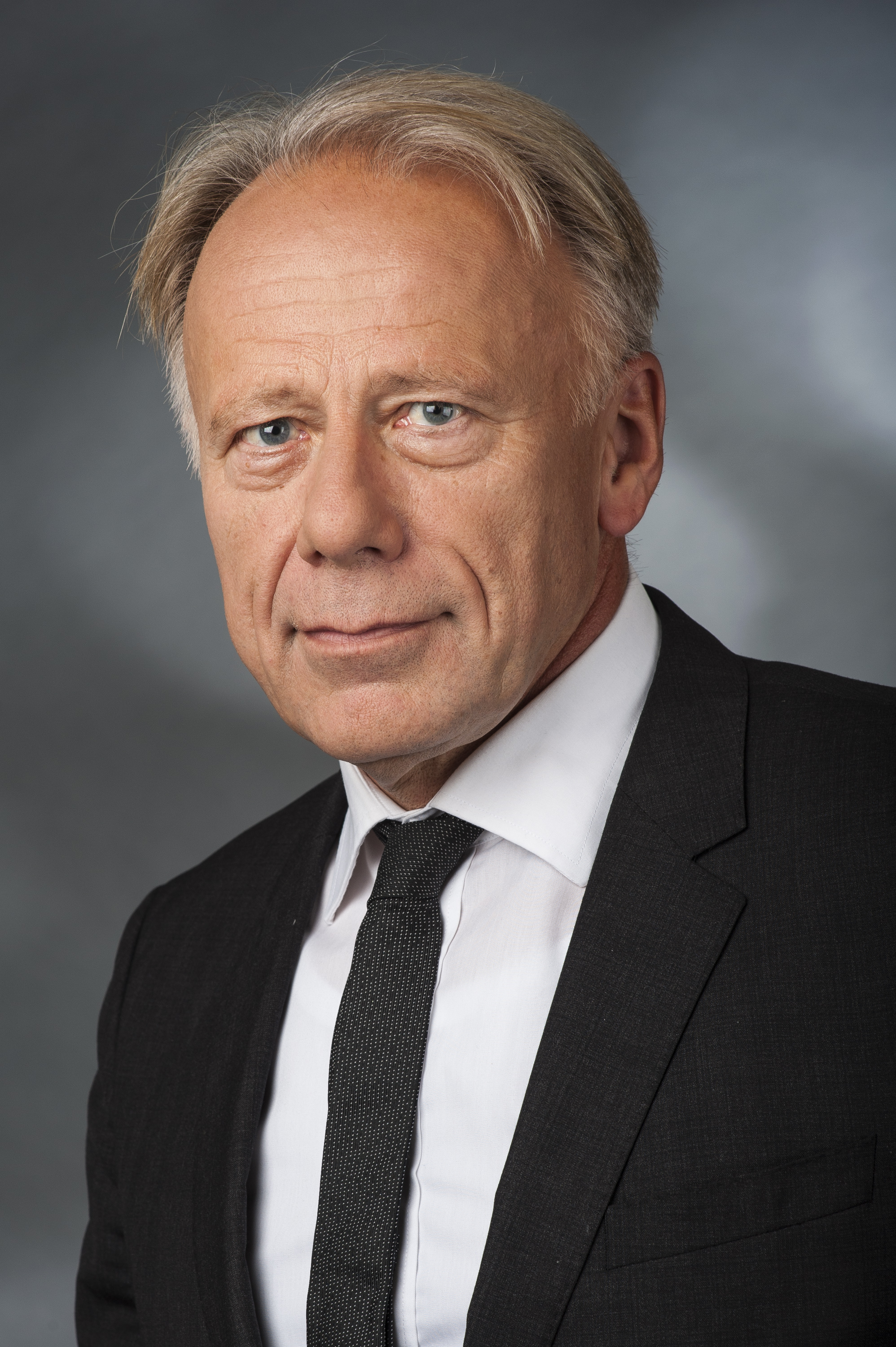
- Trittin in January 2013

Leader of Alliance '90/The Greens in the Bundestag
- In office 6 October 2009 – 8 October 2013 Serving with Renate Künast
- Chief Whip: Volker Beck
- Preceded by: Fritz Kuhn
- Succeeded by: Anton Hofreiter

Minister of the Environment, Nature Conservation and Nuclear Safety
- In office 27 October 1998 – 22 November 2005
- Chancellor: Gerhard Schröder
- Preceded by: Angela Merkel
- Succeeded by: Sigmar Gabriel

Leader of the Alliance '90/The Greens
- In office 3 December 1994 – 27 September 1998 Serving with Krista Sager and Gunda Röstel
- Preceded by: Ludger Volmer
- Succeeded by: Antje Radcke

Minister of Federal and European Affairs of Lower Saxony
- In office 21 June 1990 – 20 June 1994
- Minister President: Gerhard Schröder
- Preceded by: Heinrich Jürgens
- Succeeded by: Heidrun Merk

Member of the Bundestag Lower Saxony
- In office 27 September 1998 – 31 December 2023
- Constituency: Alliance '90/The Greens List

Member of the Landtag of Lower Saxony
- In office 13 May 1994 – 25 January 1995
- Constituency: Alliance '90/The Greens List
- In office 5 June 1985 – 13 May 1990
- Constituency: The Greens List

Personal details
- Born: 25 July 1954 (age 72) Bremen, West Germany
- Party: Alliance 90/The Greens
- Education: University of Göttingen
- Website: www.trittin.de

Jürgen Trittin (born 25 July 1954) is a German Green politician who served as Minister for the Environment, Nature Conservation and Nuclear Safety in the government of Chancellor Gerhard Schröder from 1998 to 2005.

== Early life and education ==
Trittin was born in Bremen, as son of Helene and Klaus Trittin. He earned a university degree in social economy in Göttingen and worked as journalist.

== Political career ==
=== Early beginnings ===
Trittin's political career started in 1982 as Secretary of the Alternative-Greens-Initiative List (AGIL) Group in the Göttingen City Council (until 1984). From 1984 to 1985, he worked as press spokesman for the Green Party's group in the Lower Saxony State Assembly, which he joined in 1985 as member of the state parliament.

=== Career in state politics, 1990–1998 ===
From 1990 to 1994, Trittin was the Minister for Federal and European Affairs in a coalition government with the SPD, led by Minister-President of Lower Saxony Gerhard Schröder (SPD). In his capacity as minister, he also served as the Head of the Lower Saxony State Mission to the Federal Government in Bonn.

After Schröder's SPD won an absolute majority in the state elections in 1994, the coalition with the Greens was ended. Trittin subsequently served as Member of the Lower Saxony State Assembly and as Deputy Chairman of the Alliance 90/The Greens group in that parliament.

Also in 1994, Trittin was elected spokesman (chairman) of the national Green Party, serving alongside Krista Sager (1994–1996) and later Gunda Röstel (1996–1998).

=== Minister for the Environment, 1998–2005 ===
In the federal red–green coalition, the federal red–green coalition government under Chancellor Gerhard Schröder, Trittin was appointed Federal Minister for the Environment, Nature Conservation and Nuclear Safety, a role which he held from October 1998 until the Grand Coalition under Chancellor Angela Merkel took power in 2005.

In his capacity as minister, Trittin was responsible for the decision to abandon the use of nuclear power by 2020, called the nuclear power phase-out (see Nuclear power in Germany). He also pushed the 2000 Renewable Energy Act through parliament. He was appointed Federal Minister for the Environment, Nature Conservation and Nuclear Safety under Chancellor Gerhard Schröder, a role which he held from October 1998 until the Grand coalition under Chancellor Angela Merkel took power in 2005.

=== Member of the German Parliament, 1998–2023 ===
In the 1998 national elections, Trittin was elected as Member of the German Bundestag. Upon entering parliament, he discontinued his work as party chairman, because its statutes did not allow concurrently being a member of parliament and a member of the party executive.

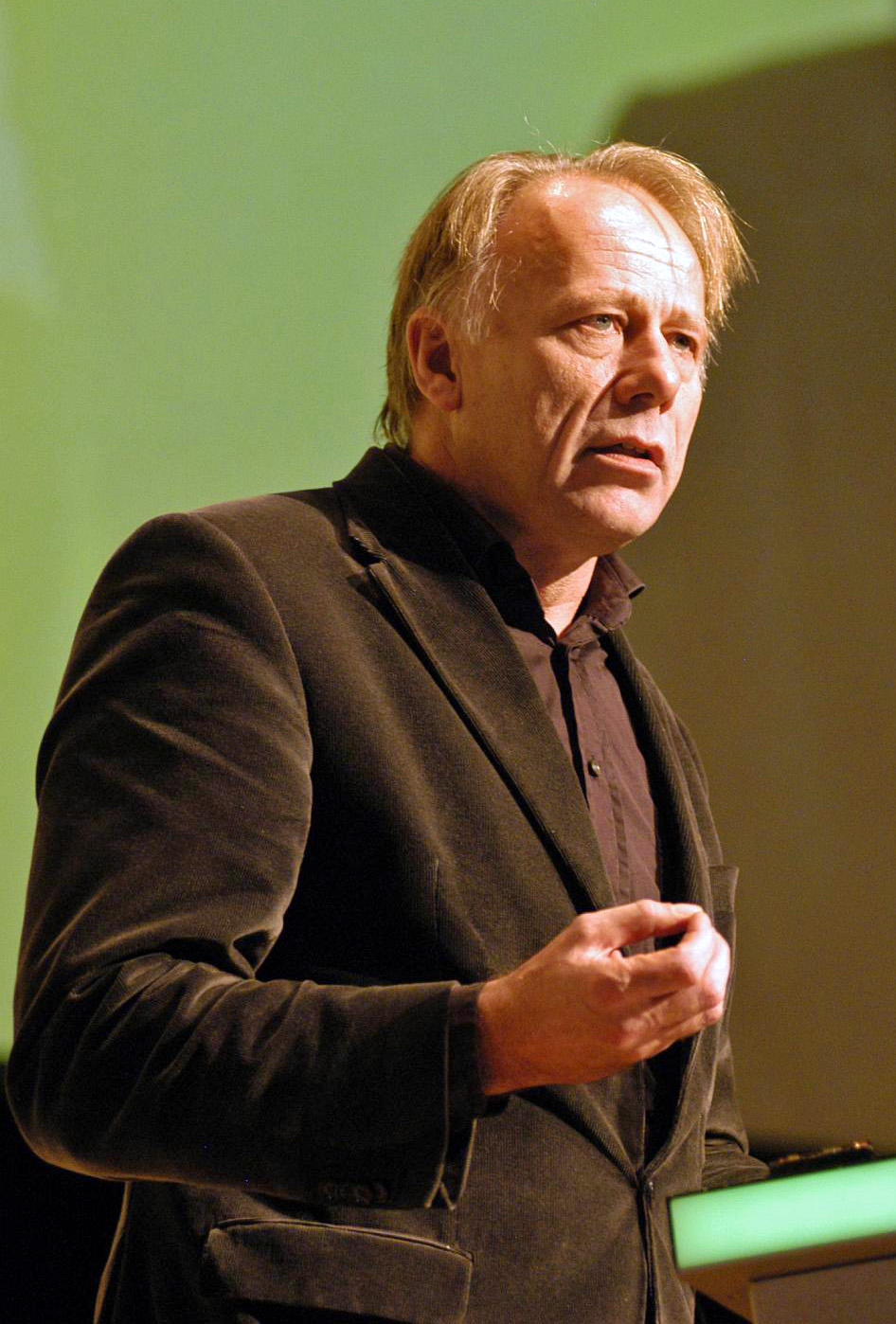
Trittin in 2008

After having lost against Fritz Kuhn in the vote on the Green Party's parliamentary group leadership in 2005, Trittin served as vice-chairman group in charge of foreign, security and European policy from 2005 to 2009.

Alongside Renate Künast, Trittin led the Green Party's campaign for the 2009 elections. In the following years, both chaired the party's parliamentary group. In addition, Trittin served as alternate member of the Committee on Foreign Affairs.

For the 2013 elections, the Greens under lead candidates Trittin and Katrin Göring-Eckardt centered their campaign on a call for tax increases for the wealthy, a strategy that many in the party later blamed for its losses in the polls. As part of the campaign, Trittin strengthened his profile as foreign policy expert by making a five-day trip to the United States in May 2013, including meetings with United Nations Secretary-General Ban Ki-moon, former U.S. Secretary of State Henry Kissinger and officials from the International Monetary Fund.

Following his party's defeat in the elections, Trittin became a member of the Committee on Foreign Affairs and of the German delegation to the NATO Parliamentary Assembly. He also served as deputy chairman of the German-Russian Parliamentary Friendship Group and of the German-Iranian Parliamentary Friendship Group.

In late 2015, Trittin was named co-chairman (alongside Ole von Beust and Matthias Platzeck) of a government-appointed commission tasked with recommending by early 2016 how to safeguard the funding of fulfilling Germany's exit from nuclear energy. By April 2016, the commission agreed to ask the power firms to pay €23.3 billion ($26.4 billion) into a state fund to cover the costs of nuclear waste storage.

In the negotiations to form a so-called traffic light coalition of the Social Democratic Party (SPD), the Green Party and the Free Democratic Party (FDP) following the 2021 federal elections, Trittin was part of his party's delegation in the working group on climate protection and energy policy, co-chaired by Matthias Miersch, Oliver Krischer and Lukas Köhler.

In December 2023, Trittin announced that he would not stand in the 2025 federal elections but instead resign from active politics by the end of the year. He was replaced in the Bundestag by Ottmar von Holtz.

== Political positions ==
=== Human rights ===
In August 2012, Trittin was one of 124 members of the Bundestag to sign a letter that was sent to the Russian ambassador to Germany, Vladimir Grinin, expressing concern over the trial against the three members of Pussy Riot. "Being held in detention for months and the threat of lengthy punishment are draconian and disproportionate," the lawmakers said in the letter. "In a secular and pluralist state, peaceful artistic acts – even if they can be seen as provocative – must not lead to the accusation of serious criminal acts that lead to lengthy prison terms."

=== Environment policy ===
At the time of Hurricane Katrina in August/September 2005, Trittin wrote an opinion piece in the newspaper Frankfurter Rundschau associating the US failure to sign the Kyoto Protocol with the hurricane and its devastation.

In August 2005, Trittin responded to a question on how best to react to the 2005 petrol prices crisis with "leave the car at home from time to time." The media, in particular the Bild newspaper, attacked these comments.

== Controversy ==
In 1981, Trittin approved an election platform for the Alternative Green Initiative List, a precursor of the Green Party, which called for the legalization of sexual relations between adults and minors.

Already by 1999, shortly after Gerhard Schröder's coalition government, Trittin told Stern magazine that "Red-Green as a reform project is dead," adding that he saw the Social Democrats as virtually indistinguishable now from the Christian Democrats of former Chancellor Helmut Kohl. He added that the Greens might even consider future political alliances with the Christian Democrats.

In 2001, Trittin compared a prominent Christian Democrat, Laurenz Meyer, to a "skinhead" for declaring that he was proud to be a German. A vigorous debate on the legitimacy of German patriotism has ensued, with most Germans appearing sharply critical of Trittin. The minister justified his remark by noting that extreme-right parties in Germany often use the badge, "I am proud to be a German." However, Trittin came under considerable pressure to quit after making the remark and was openly reprimanded by Chancellor Gerhard Schröder. The Greens' voting results subsequently fell significantly – to 7.8 percent, from 12.1 percent in the 1996 state election, in Baden-Württemberg, and to 5.3 percent, from 6.9 percent, in Rhineland-Palatinate.

In 2010, Trittin attended an event to commemorate the thirtieth anniversary of the Free Republic of Wendland in Hannover where someone threw a pie at him during a panel discussion.

== Other activities ==
=== Corporate boards ===
- KfW, ex-officio Member of the Board of Supervisory Directors (1998–2005)

=== Non-profit organizations ===
- German Council on Foreign Relations (DGAP), Member of the Advisory Council (since 2022)
- German Institute for International and Security Affairs (SWP), Member of the Council (since 2022)
- German Association for Small and Medium-Sized Businesses (BVMW), Member of the Political Advisory Board
- Nuclear Waste Disposal Fund, Member of the Board of Trustees (since 2017)
- Foundation for Reusable Systems (SIM), Member of the Board of Trustees
- Weltfriedensdienst (WFD), Member of the Board of Trustees
- German Energy Agency (dena), Member of the supervisory board (1998–2005)

== Selected publications ==
- Trittin, Jürgen; Eid, Uschi; Müller-Kraenner, Sascha; Greger, Nika (October 2001). From Rio to Johannesburg: Contributions to the Globalization of Sustainability (PDF). Berlin, Germany: Heinrich Böll Foundation.
