= Politics of Lower Saxony =

Politics of a state of Germany

The Lower Saxony State Parliament ("Landtag") in Hannover

The politics of Lower Saxony takes place within a framework of a federal parliamentary representative democratic republic, where the Federal Government of Germany exercises sovereign rights with certain powers reserved to the states of Germany including Lower Saxony. Since 1948 politics in the state has been dominated by the rightist Christian Democratic Union (CDU) and the leftist Social Democratic Party. Lower Saxony was one of the origins of the German environmentalist movement in reaction to the state government's support for underground nuclear waste disposal. This led to the formation of the German Green Party in 1980.

== Minister-presidents ==
Political party: SPD DP CDU

Portrait	Name (Born–Died)	Term of office			Political party	Election
Portrait	Name (Born–Died)	Took office	Left office	Days	Political party	Election
State of Lower Saxony (1946–present)
British occupation zone of Germany (1946–1949)
State of the Federal Republic of Germany (as of 23 May 1949)
1	Hinrich Wilhelm Kopf (1893–1961)	9 December 1946	26 May 1955	3090	Social Democratic Party	1947; 1951
2	Heinrich Hellwege (1908–1991)	26 May 1955	12 May 1959	1447	German Party	1955
3 (1)	Hinrich Wilhelm Kopf (1893–1961)	12 May 1959	21 December 1961 (died in office)	954	Social Democratic Party	1959
4	Georg Diederichs (1900–1983)	29 December 1961	8 July 1970	3113	Social Democratic Party	1963; 1967
5	Alfred Kubel (1909–1999)	8 July 1970	6 February 1976 (resigned)	2039	Social Democratic Party	1970; 1974
6	Ernst Albrecht (1930–2014)	6 February 1976	21 June 1990	5249	Christian Democratic Union	1974; 1978; 1982; 1986
7	Gerhard Schröder (born 1944)	21 June 1990	27 October 1998 (resigned to become Chancellor)	3050	Social Democratic Party	1990; 1994; 1998
8	Gerhard Glogowski (born 1943)	28 October 1998	15 October 1999 (resigned)	352	Social Democratic Party	1998
9	Sigmar Gabriel (born 1959)	15 October 1999	4 March 2003	1236	Social Democratic Party	1998
10	Christian Wulff (born 1959)	4 March 2003	30 June 2010 (resigned to become President)	2675	Christian Democratic Union	2003; 2008
11	David McAllister (born 1971)	1 July 2010	19 February 2013	964	Christian Democratic Union	2008
12	Stephan Weil (born 1958)	19 February 2013	Incumbent	5010	Social Democratic Party	2013; 2017; 2022

== Landtag of Lower Saxony ==
=== Party strength in the Landtag ===
A darkened box under a party in any given year denotes that the party had either not yet been founded, or the party had become defunct, by the date of that election.

Election year	Total seats	Seats won									
Election year	Total seats	SPD	CDU	FDP	GB/BHE	Grüne	DP	KPD	DZP	AfD	Others
1947	149	65	30	13			27	8	6		
1951	158	64	35	12	21		(Note: Ran jointly with CDU as the Low German Confederation)	2	4		20 (Note: 16 SRP, 3 DRP, 1 DSP)
1955	159	59	43	12	17		19	2	1		6 (Note: DRP)
1959	157	65	51	8	13		20				
1963	149	73	62	14							
1967	149	66	63	10							10 (Note: NDP)
1970	149	75	74								
1974	155	67	77	11							
1978	155	72	83								
1982	171	63	87	10		11					
1986	155	66	69	9		11					
1990	155	71	67	9		8					
1994	161	81	67			13					
1998	157	83	62			12					
2003	183	63	91	15		14					
2008	152	48	68	13		12					11 (Note: Left)
2013	137	49	54	14		20					
2018	137	55	50	11		12				9	
2022	146	57	47			24				18	

=== Legislative compositions ===
1st Landtag, following 1947 election

2nd Landtag, following 1951 election

3rd Landtag, following 1955 election

4th Landtag, following 1959 election

5th Landtag, following 1963 election

6th Landtag, following 1967 election

7th Landtag, following 1970 election

8th Landtag, following 1974 election

9th Landtag, following 1978 election

10th Landtag, following 1982 election

11th Landtag, following 1986 election

12th Landtag, following 1990 election

13th Landtag, following 1994 election

14th Landtag, following 1998 election

15th Landtag, following 2003 election

16th Landtag, following 2008 election

17th Landtag, following 2013 election

18th Landtag, following 2017 election

19th Landtag, following 2022 election

=== State election results maps ===
1990 Lower Saxony state election, Red is SPD, Black is CDU

1994 Lower Saxony state election, Red is SPD, Black is CDU

1998 Lower Saxony state election, Red is SPD, Black is CDU

2003 Lower Saxony state election, Red is SPD, Black is CDU

2008 Lower Saxony state election, Red is SPD, Black is CDU

2013 Lower Saxony state election, Red is SPD, Black is CDU

2017 Lower Saxony state election, Red is SPD, Black is CDU

2022 Lower Saxony state election, Red is SPD, Black is CDU

=== Constituencies in the Landtag ===
- Braunschweig-Nord (01)
- Braunschweig-Süd (02)
- Braunschweig-West (03)
- Peine (04)
- Gifhorn-Nord/Wolfsburg (05)
- Gifhorn-Süd (06)
- Wolfsburg (07)
- Helmstedt (08)
- Wolfenbüttel-Nord (09)
- Wolfenbüttel-Süd/Salzgitter (10)
- Salzgitter (11)
- Göttingen/Harz (12)
- Goslar (13)
- Duderstadt (14)
- Göttingen/Münden (15)
- Göttingen-Stadt (16)
- Northeim (17)
- Einbeck (18)
- Holzminden (19)
- Hildesheim (20)
- Sarstedt/Bad Salzdetfurth (21)
- Alfeld (22)
- Hannover-Döhren (23)
- Hannover-Buchholz (24)
- Hannover-Linden (25)
- Hannover-Richlingen (26)
- Hannover-Mitte (27)
- Laatzen (28)
- Lehrte (29)
- Langenhagen (30)
- Garbsen/Wedemark (31)
- Neustadt/Wunstorf (32)
- Barsinghausen (33)
- Springe (34)
- Bad Pyrmont (35)
- Schaumburg (36)
- Hameln/Rinteln (37)
- Nienburg/Schaumburg (38)
- Nienburg-Nord (39)
- Syke (40)
- Siepholz (41)
- Waldrode (42)
- Soltau (43)
- Bergen (44)
- Celle (45)
- Uelzen (46)
- Elbe (47)
- Lüneburg-Land (48)
- Lüneburg (49)
- Winsen (50)
- Seevetal (51)
- Buchholz (52)
- Rotenburg (53)
- Bremervörde (54)
- Buxtehude (55)
- Stade (56)
- Geestland (57)
- Cuxhaven (58)
- Unterweser (59)
- Osterholz (60)
- Verden (61)
- Oldenburg-Mitte/Süd (62)
- Oldenburg-Nord/West (63)
- Oldenburg-Land (64)
- Delmenhorst (65)
- Cloppenburg-Nord (66)
- Cloppenburg (67)
- Vechta (68)
- Wilhelmshaven (69)
- Friesland (70)
- Wesermarsch (71)
- Ammerland (72)
- Bersenbrück (73)
- Melle (74)
- Bramsche (75)
- Georgsmarienhütte (76)
- Osnabrück-Ost (77)
- Osnabrück-West (78)
- Grafschaft Bentheim (79)
- Lingen (80)
- Meppen (81)
- Papenburg (82)
- Leer (83)
- Leer/Borkum (84)
- Emden/Norden (85)
- Aurich (86)
- Wittmund/Inseln (87)

== Constituencies in the Bundestag ==
No	Constituency	Member	2021	Voters	2017	2013	2009	2005	2002	1998	1994	1990
24	Aurich – Emden	Johann Saathoff	SPD	191,846	SPD	SPD	SPD	SPD	SPD	SPD	SPD	SPD
25	Unterems	Gitta Connemann	CDU	238,506	CDU	CDU	CDU	CDU	CDU	CDU	CDU	CDU
26	Friesland – Wilhelmshaven – Wittmund	Siemtje Möller	SPD	189,047	SPD	SPD	SPD	SPD	SPD	SPD	SPD	SPD
27	Oldenburg - Ammerland	Dennis Rohde	SPD	228,705	SPD	SPD	CDU	SPD	SPD	SPD	SPD	SPD
28	Delmenhorst – Wesermarsch – Oldenburg-Land	Susanne Mittag	SPD	226,827	CDU	CDU	CDU	SPD	SPD	SPD	SPD	SPD
29	Cuxhaven – Stade II	Daniel Schneider	SPD	188,602	CDU	CDU	CDU	Created for 2009 election				
30	Stade I – Rotenburg II	Oliver Grundmann	CDU	198,576	CDU	CDU	CDU	Abolished		SPD	CDU	CDU
31	Mittelems	Albert Stegemann	CDU	233,253	CDU	CDU	CDU	CDU	CDU	CDU	CDU	CDU
32	Cloppenburg - Vechta	Silvia Breher	CDU	223,948	CDU	CDU	CDU	CDU	CDU	CDU	CDU	CDU
33	Diepholz – Nienburg I	Axel Knoerig	CDU	194,371	CDU	CDU	CDU	SPD	SPD	SPD	CDU	CDU
34	Osterholz – Verden	Andreas Mattfeldt	CDU	197,490	CDU	CDU	CDU	Abolished		SPD	SPD	SPD
35	Rotenburg I - Heidekreis	Lars Klingbeil	SPD	168,927	SPD	CDU	CDU	Abolished		SPD	CDU	CDU
36	Harburg	Svenja Stadler	SPD	201,740	CDU	CDU	CDU	Abolished		SPD	CDU	CDU
37	Lüchow-Dannenberg – Lüneburg	Jakob Blankenburg	SPD	182,673	CDU	CDU	CDU	SPD	SPD	SPD	CDU	CDU
38	Osnabrück-Land	André Berghegger	CDU	199,960	CDU	CDU	CDU	CDU	CDU	CDU	CDU	CDU
39	Stadt Osnabrück	Manuel Gava	SPD	195,467	CDU	CDU	CDU	SPD	SPD	SPD	CDU	CDU
40	Nienburg II – Schaumburg	Marja-Liisa Völlers	SPD	193,863	CDU	SPD	SPD	SPD	SPD	SPD	SPD	CDU
41	Stadt Hannover I	Adis Ahmetovic	SPD	176,770	SPD	SPD	SPD	SPD	SPD	SPD	SPD	SPD
42	Stadt Hannover II	Yasmin Fahimi	SPD	190,336	SPD	SPD	SPD	SPD	SPD	SPD	SPD	SPD
43	Hannover-Land I	Rebecca Schamber	SPD	231,250	CDU	CDU	SPD	SPD	SPD	SPD	CDU	CDU
44	Celle – Uelzen	Henning Otte	CDU	214,482	CDU	CDU	CDU	SPD	SPD	SPD	CDU	CDU
45	Gifhorn – Peine	Hubertus Heil	SPD	219,966	SPD	SPD	SPD	SPD	SPD	SPD	CDU	CDU
46	Hameln-Pyrmont – Holzminden	Johannes Schraps	SPD	184,471	SPD	SPD	SPD	SPD	SPD	SPD	SPD	SPD
47	Hannover-Land II	Matthias Miersch	SPD	238,323	SPD	SPD	SPD	SPD	SPD	SPD	CDU	CDU
48	Hildesheim	Bernd Westphal	SPD	215,131	SPD	CDU	SPD	SPD	SPD	SPD	SPD	SPD
49	Salzgitter - Wolfenbüttel	Dunja Kreiser	SPD	200,922	SPD	SPD	SPD	SPD	SPD	SPD	SPD	SPD
50	Braunschweig	Christos Pantazis	SPD	187,721	SPD	SPD	SPD	SPD	SPD	SPD	SPD	CDU
51	Helmstedt – Wolfsburg	Falko Mohrs	SPD	180,147	SPD	CDU	CDU	SPD	SPD	SPD	CDU	CDU
52	Goslar – Northeim – Göttingen II	Frauke Heiligenstadt	SPD	197,519	CDU	SPD	SPD	SPD	SPD	SPD	SPD	SPD
53	Göttingen	Andreas Philippi	SPD	214,542	SPD	SPD	SPD	SPD	SPD	SPD	CDU	CDU
