= Albrecht family =

North German family

Albrecht
- Political family
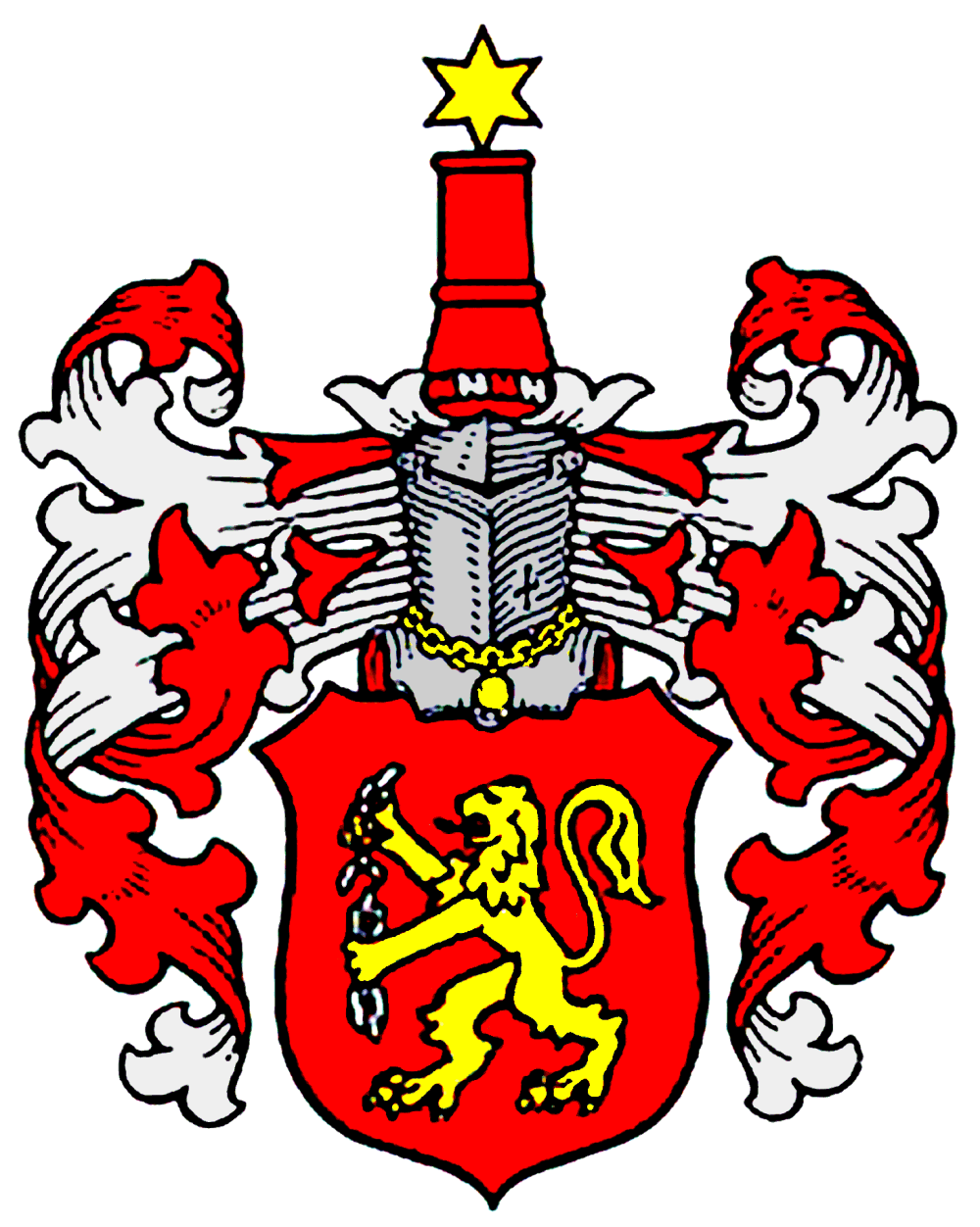
- Coat of arms of the Albrecht family
- Origin: Höxter, Germany
- Founded: Birth of Barthold Albrecht 1557, Höxter; 469 years ago
- Founder: Barthold Albrecht
- Connected families: Knoop family Ladson family Von der Leyen

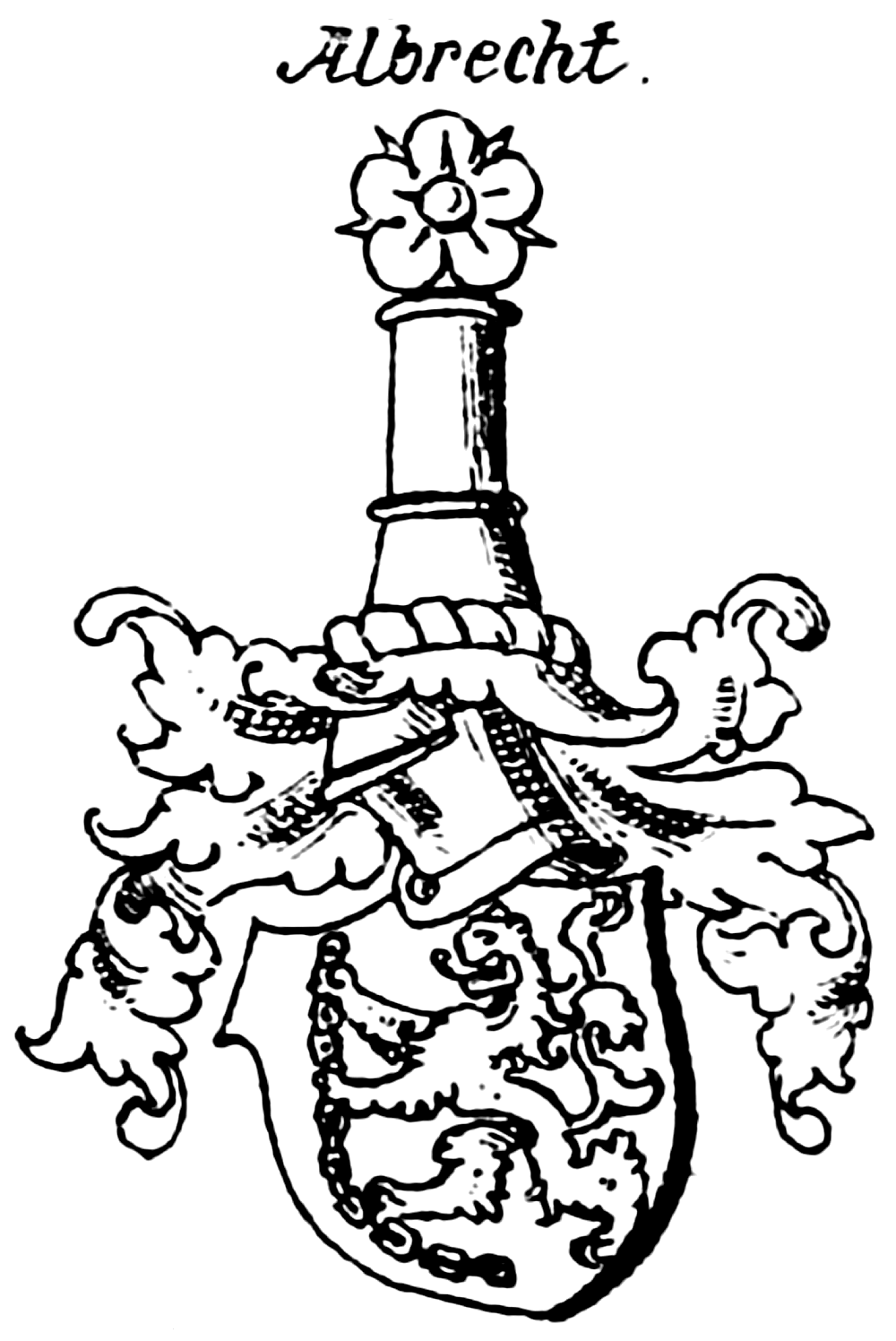
Coat of arms of the Albrecht family (1895)

The Albrecht family is an old North German patrician family originating from the Electorate of Hanover, whose members have been prominent as politicians, civil servants and businesspeople. The family was among the hübsche ("courtly" or "genteel") families of the Kingdom of Hanover, the informal third elite group after the nobility and the clergy that encompassed the higher bourgeoisie and university-educated civil servants.

== History ==
The family was first mentioned at the end of the 15th century in a register book of the city of Höxter on the river Weser, North Rhine-Westphalia.

The progenitor, or the founder of the family was Barthold Albrecht (1557-1642), who was a pastor in Bodenwerder. Numerous of his descendants were doctors, jurists, politicians, and civil servants in what became the Electorate and later the Kingdom of Hanover. The lawyer Karl Franz Georg Albrecht (1799–1873) became director-general of direct taxation in the Kingdom of Hanover in 1847, and then director-general of customs from 1854 and member of the State Council of Hanover from 1856. He was the father of George Alexander Albrecht (1834–1898), who became a wealthy cotton merchant in the city state of Bremen, where he became part of the Hanseatic elite and was appointed as the Consul of the Austro-Hungarian Empire in 1895. He married Baroness Louise Dorothea Betty von Knoop (1844–1889), the eldest daughter of the major cotton industrialist, Baron Ludwig Johann von Knoop, who had been ennobled in the Empire of Russia by Emperor Alexander II.

They were the parents of the cotton merchant Carl Albrecht (1875–1952), who married Mary Ladson Robertson (1883–1960), who belonged to a prominent American family of the Southern aristocracy from Charleston, South Carolina; she was a descendant of James Ladson and several colonial governors of Carolina. Carl and Mary Albrecht were the parents of the medical doctor and psychologist Carl Albrecht (1902–1965). The latter was the father of the conductor George Alexander Albrecht and Ernst Albrecht, the European civil servant who later served as Prime Minister of Lower Saxony.

The conductor George Alexander Albrecht was the father of the chief conductor of the Dutch National Opera Marc Albrecht while Ernst Albrecht was the father of the President of the European Commission Ursula von der Leyen (née Albrecht) and of her younger brother, the businessman Hans-Holger Albrecht.

The family is included in the Deutsches Geschlechterbuch which covers the most prominent families in Germany.

== Coat of arms ==
Over the course of history, the family received a coat of arms for their services, blazoned gules, a lion or breaking a chain argent (i.e., a golden lion breaking a silver chain on a red shield). On a jousting helmet torsed and mantled gules and argent, a pillar gules surmounted with a mullet of six points, or (a Frog-mouth helm with a wreath and headcloth of red and silver, out of which rises a red column with a six-pointed golden star on top).

== Family tree ==
- Barthold Albrecht (1557–1642), a pastor
  - Statius Albrecht (1603–1651), medical doctor
    - Johann Peter Albrecht (1651–1724), medical doctor
      - Johann Günter Albrecht (1676–1745), medical doctor (Oberlandphysicus) in Hildesheim
        - Johann Peter Albrecht (1703–1753), state councillor (Hof- und Regierungsrat) in the Electorate of Cologne
          - Johann Friedrich Albrecht (1737–1799), county governor of Isenhagen
            - Franz August Heinrich Albrecht (1766–1848), county governor of Syke
              - Karl Franz Georg Albrecht (1799–1873), state councillor and director-general of customs in the Kingdom of Hanover
                - George Alexander Albrecht (1834–1898), consul and cotton merchant in Bremen; married Baroness Louise Dorothea von Knoop (1844–1889)
                  - Carl Albrecht (1875–1952), cotton merchant in Bremen; married Mary Ladson-Robertson from the slave-owning planter class Ladson family from South Carolina.
                    - Carl Albrecht (1902–1965), medical doctor and psychologist
                      - George Alexander Albrecht (1935–2021), conductor
                        - Marc Albrecht (1964–), conductor
                      - Ernst Albrecht (1930–2014), director-general of the European Commission and Prime Minister of Lower Saxony
                        - Ursula von der Leyen (1958–), President of the European Commission
                        - Hans-Holger Albrecht (1963–), businessman
