= Cabinet Albrecht V =

Fifth Cabinet of Ernst Albrecht Albrecht V
- 19th Cabinet of Lower Saxony

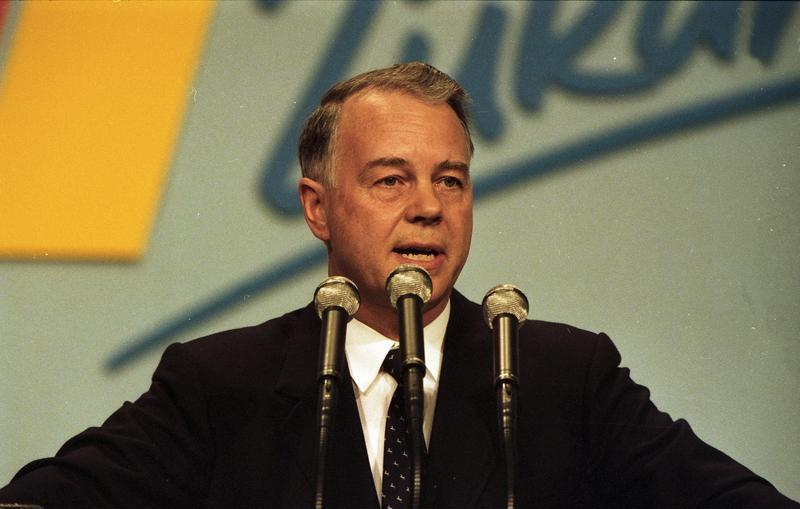
- Ernst Albrecht in 1988
- Date formed: 9 July 1986
- Date dissolved: 21 June 1990

People and organisations
- Minister-President: Ernst Albrecht
- No. of ministers: 9
- Member parties: Christian Democratic Union of Germany; Free Democratic Party
- Status in legislature: Coalition government
- Opposition parties: Social Democratic Party; Alliance 90/The Greens

History
- Election: 1986 Lower Saxony state election
- Legislature term: 11th Landtag of Lower Saxony
- Predecessor: Albrecht IV cabinet
- Successor: Cabinet Schröder I

The Albrecht V cabinet formed the state government of Lower Saxony from 9 July 1986 to 21 June 1990. It was the fifth cabinet formed by Ernst Albrecht following the state elections on 15 June 1986 and ended with the regular state elections on 13 May 1990. In these elections, the SPD (44.2%) became the strongest party ahead of the CDU (42.0%); Gerhard Schröder became Minister-President of Lower Saxony and formed a red-green coalition government in the state.

== Ministers ==
Cabinet of Albrecht V – 9 July 1986 to 21 June 1990
Office	Name	Party
Minister-President	Ernst Albrecht	CDU
Deputy Minister-President	Wilfried Hasselmann (until October 31, 1988)	CDU
Deputy Minister-President	Josef Stock (until October 31, 1988)	CDU
Interior	Wilfried Hasselmann (bis 31. Oktober 1988)	CDU
Interior	Walter Remmers (October 31, 1988 to November 9, 1988)	CDU
Interior	Josef Stock (from November 9, 1988)	CDU
Economy, Technology and Transport	Walter Hirche	FDP
Food, Agriculture and Forestry	Burkhard Ritz	CDU
Finance	Birgit Breuel	CDU
Justice	Walter Remmers	CDU
Culture	Georg-Berndt Oschatz (until 30 April 1987)	CDU
Culture	Wolfgang Knies (6 May 1987 to 9 November 1988)	CDU
Culture	Horst Horrmann (from 9 November 1988)	CDU
Science and Art	Johann-Tönjes Cassens	CDU
Environment	Walter Remmers	CDU
Social affairs	Hermann Schnipkoweit	CDU
Federal and European Affairs	Heinrich Jürgens	FDP
