= Karl Franz Georg Albrecht =

German jurist (1799–1873)

Karl (or Carl) Franz Georg Albrecht (19 May 1799 – 11 February 1873) was a Hanoverian lawyer and high-ranking civil servant, who was a member of the State Council of Hanover and Director-General of Customs.

== Biography ==
A member of the Albrecht family of civil servants, Albrecht was the son of county governor in Syke Franz August Heinrich Albrecht (1766–1858). He studied law at the University of Göttingen from 1817 and joined the Hanoverian civil service in 1821. At the time the Kingdom of Hanover was in a personal union with the United Kingdom of Great Britain and Ireland. In 1828, he joined the Ministry of Finance and he was promoted to Councillor (Hofrat) in 1841. In 1843, he became Senior Councillor (Oberfinanzrat) and in 1847 he became Director-General of Direct Taxation and associate member of the State Council, then presided over by Prime Minister Eduard von Kielmansegg. In 1854, he became Director-General of Customs and in 1856 he became a full member of the newly reformed State Council.

Albrecht was a Commander First Class of the Royal Guelphic Order.

He was the 2nd great-grandfather of the Prime Minister of Lower Saxony, the successor state of Hanover, Ernst Albrecht, and the 3rd great-grandfather of the President of the European Commission Ursula von der Leyen (née Albrecht).
