= Hans-Holger Albrecht =

German businessman (born 1963)

- Born: 29 July 1963 (age 62); Brussels, Belgium
- Occupations: CEO, Deezer
- Father: Ernst Albrecht
- Relatives: Ursula von der Leyen (sister); Carl Albrecht (grandfather)

Hans-Holger Albrecht (born 29 July 1963) is a German businessman. He was CEO of Deezer until 2021, one of the largest music streaming services worldwide. Deezer offers more than 53 million tracks in over 180 countries to currently more than 14 million active monthly users. He is the brother of Ursula von der Leyen, President of the European Commission.

== Background and early life ==
Hans-Holger was born in Brussels, Belgium, in 1963 to Heidi Adele and Ernst (Carl Julius) Albrecht, a prominent CDU politician and European Commission official; the Albrecht family had been among the hübsche ("genteel") families of the Electorate of Hanover as doctors, jurists and civil servants since the 17th century, but his immediate ancestors had been wealthy cotton merchants in Bremen and members of the city-state's Hanseatic elite in the 19th and 20th centuries. In 1971, the family moved to Germany, where Ernst Albrecht became Premier of Lower Saxony (1976–1990). He grew up in Burgdorf in Germany. He graduated in Law at the University of Freiburg in Germany, studied at Yale University, and received a PhD at the University of Bochum in Germany.

He is a descendant of Baron Ludwig Knoop, a cotton merchant of the city-state Free Hanseatic City of Bremen and one of the most successful entrepreneurs of the 19th century.

== Business career ==
Hans-Holger worked for Daimler-Benz in 1990 and for the Luxembourg-based media group CLT forerunner of RTL Group from 1991 to 1996. At CLT, he was responsible for all television activities and for business development in Germany and Eastern Europe. He worked on new projects for RTL2 in Germany, RTL 7 (Poland), RTL Klub in Hungary, and Channel 5 (UK), in the UK. He was also responsible for the launch of the Super RTL channel in Germany and for the development of CLT's digital TV project, Club RTL.

He started his career at Modern Times Group MTG AB in 1997 as Head of the pay-TV operations at Viasat Broadcasting. In 1999, he was appointed as Head of all of Viasat Broadcasting's operations.

In April 2000, he was appointed Chief Operating Officer (COO) of MTG. He became President and CEO of MTG AB on 1 October 2000, when the Kinnevik Group was chaired by entrepreneur Jan Stenbeck, founder of MTG and telecommunications operators Tele2 and Millicom. During his tenure, MTG's sales more than doubled from 5.4 billion Swedish krona in 2000 to 13.5 billion krona in 2011. MTG had free-TV operations in 11 countries and satellite pay-TV platforms in 9 countries, operates the Viaplay Nordic online pay-TV service and its portfolio of 20 thematic movie, sports and documentary pay-TV channels were available in 34 countries across Europe, Russia, the CIS, Africa and the US.

In November 2012, Hans-Holger became President and CEO of Millicom, an international telecommunications and media company. During his time at Millicom he transformed the company into a Digital Lifestyle company developing several new digital products and services.

He became the CEO of Deezer in 2015 but stepped down in 2021.

In January 2022, Hans-Holger became chairman of the board of Storytel, one of the worlds leading streaming audiobook services.

== Private life ==
Hans-Holger Albrecht resides in London, Austria and Stockholm, and is married with seven children, as many as his father and his sister Ursula von der Leyen, who became Germany's first female defence minister on 17 December 2013. Previously she was appointed Federal Minister of Labour and Social Affairs on 30 November 2009 and, prior to that, Federal Minister of Family Affairs, Senior Citizens, Women and Youth from 2005.
