= Operation Feuerzauber =

Operation Feuerzauber or Operation Magic Fire (often mistranslated as 'Fire Magic') may refer to:

- German destruction of bridges near Florence, Italy in 1944; see List of Axis operational codenames in the European Theatre
- A German airlift operation in Spain; see German involvement in the Spanish Civil War
- Liberation of Lufthansa Flight 181 in 1977 by West German border guard commando GSG 9
- Celle Hole, a secret service operation in West Germany in 1978
