= Carl Johann Lasch =

German painter (1822–1888)

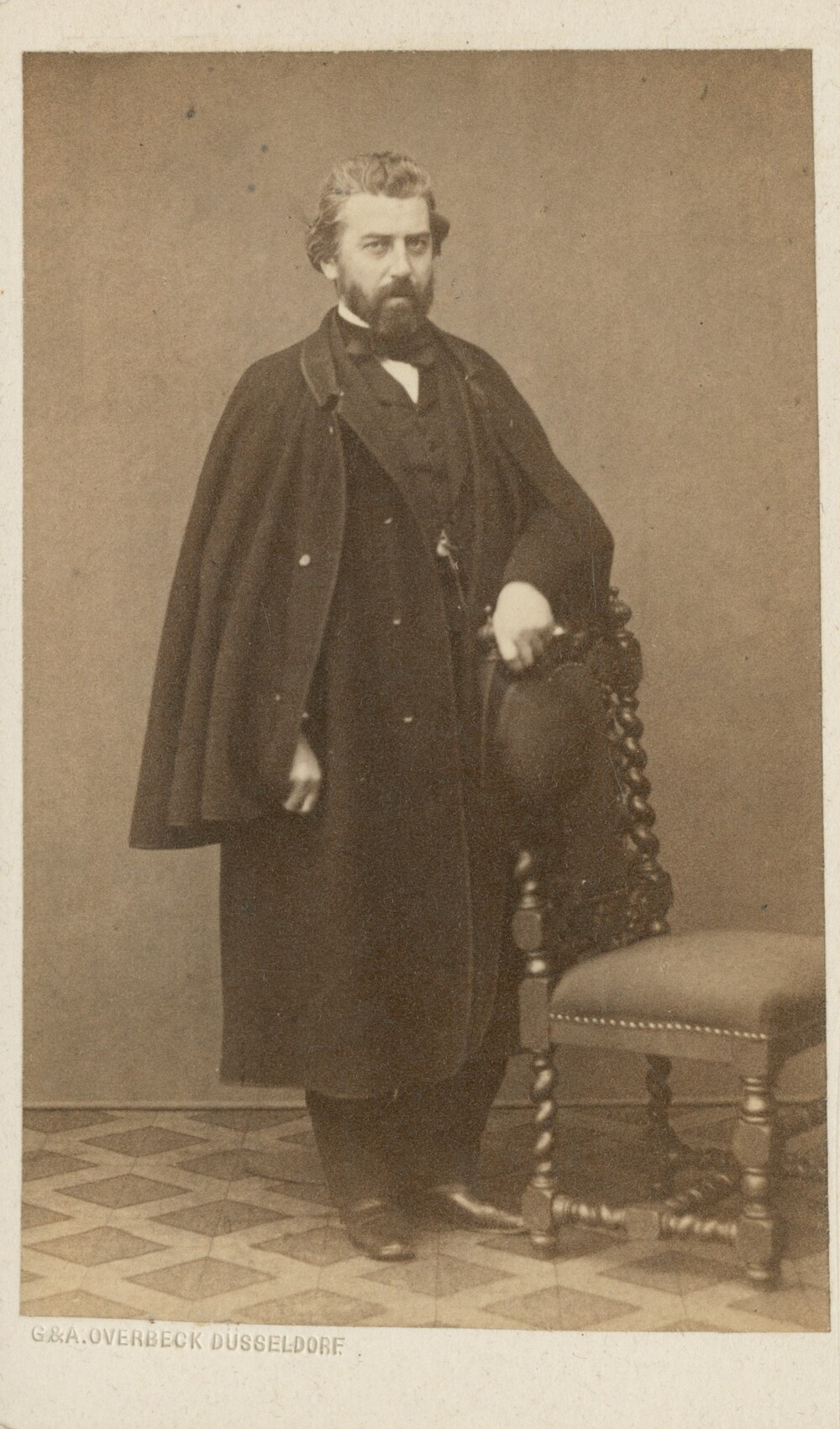
- Carl Johann Lasch by G. & A. Overbeck (firm), c. 1868
- Born: July 1, 1822; Leipzig
- Died: August 28, 1888 (aged 66); Moscow, Russian Empire
- Style: Historical painting
- Movement: Biedermeier

Carl Johann Lasch (July 1, 1822 in Leipzig – August 28, 1888 in Moscow) was a German artist of historical paintings. He was born in Leipzig. He attended the Dresden Academy of Fine Arts. One of his teachers was Eduard Bendemann. He later attended the Academy of Fine Arts, Munich. There he studied under Julius Schnorr von Carolsfeld and Wilhelm von Kaulbach.

== Gallery ==
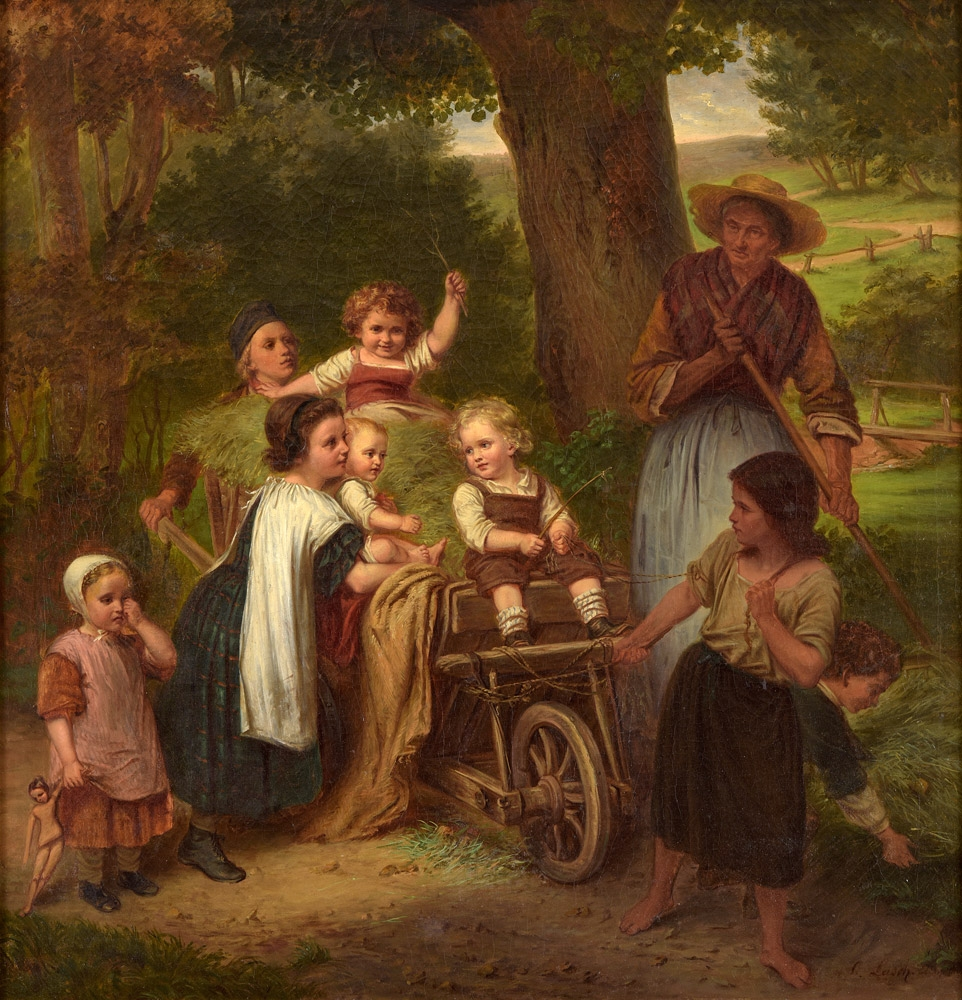
Children's Delights

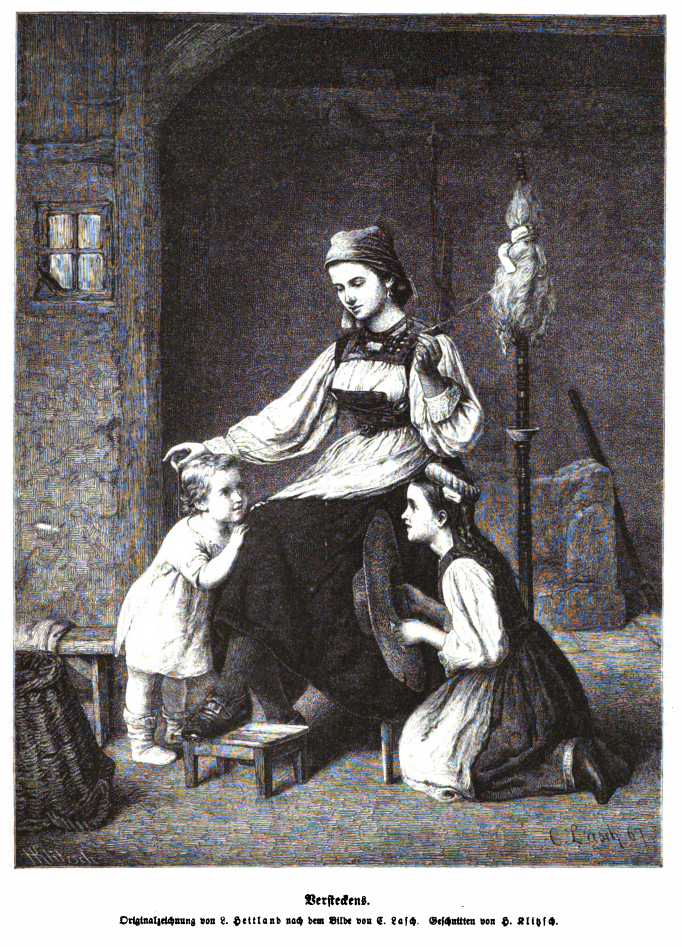
Hide and Seek

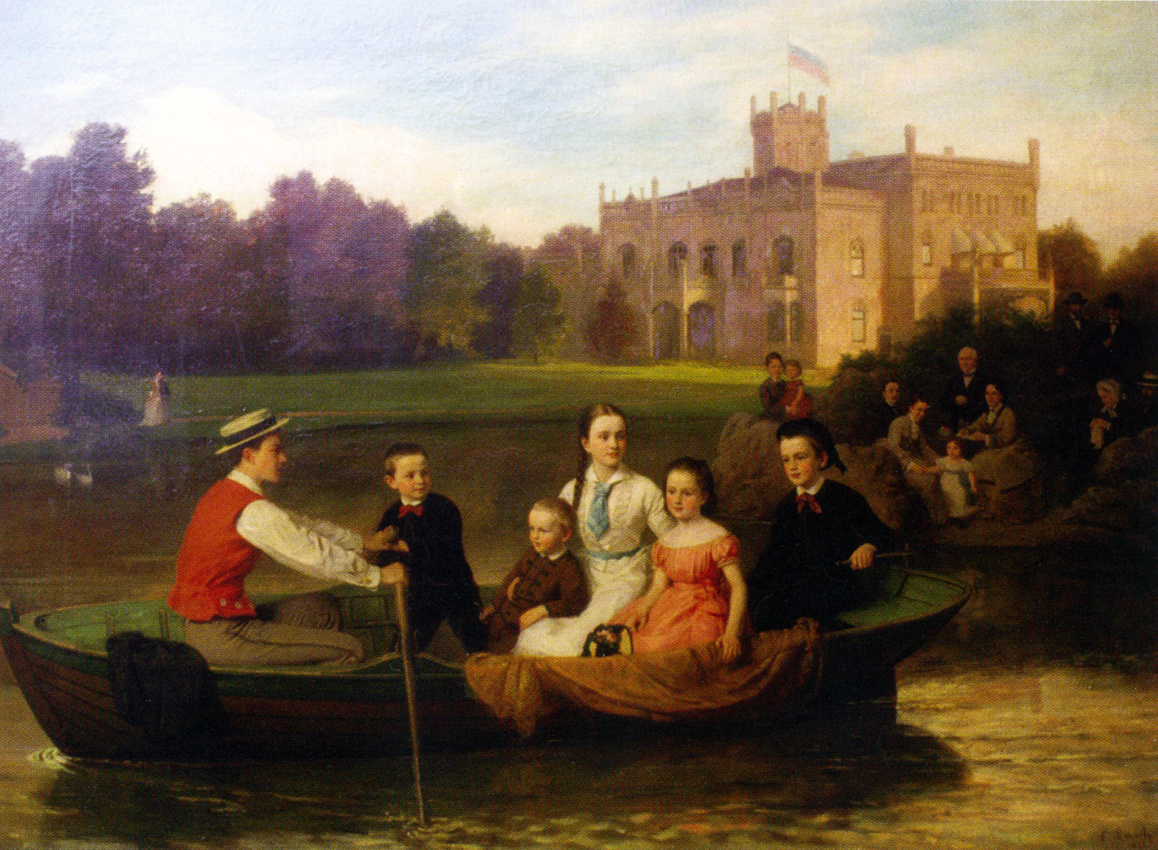
Muehlenthal Castle

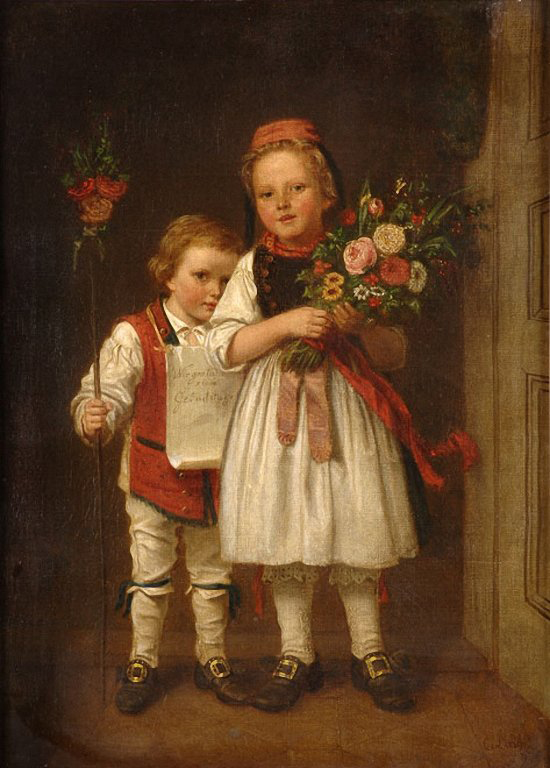
We Congratulate You on Your Birthday

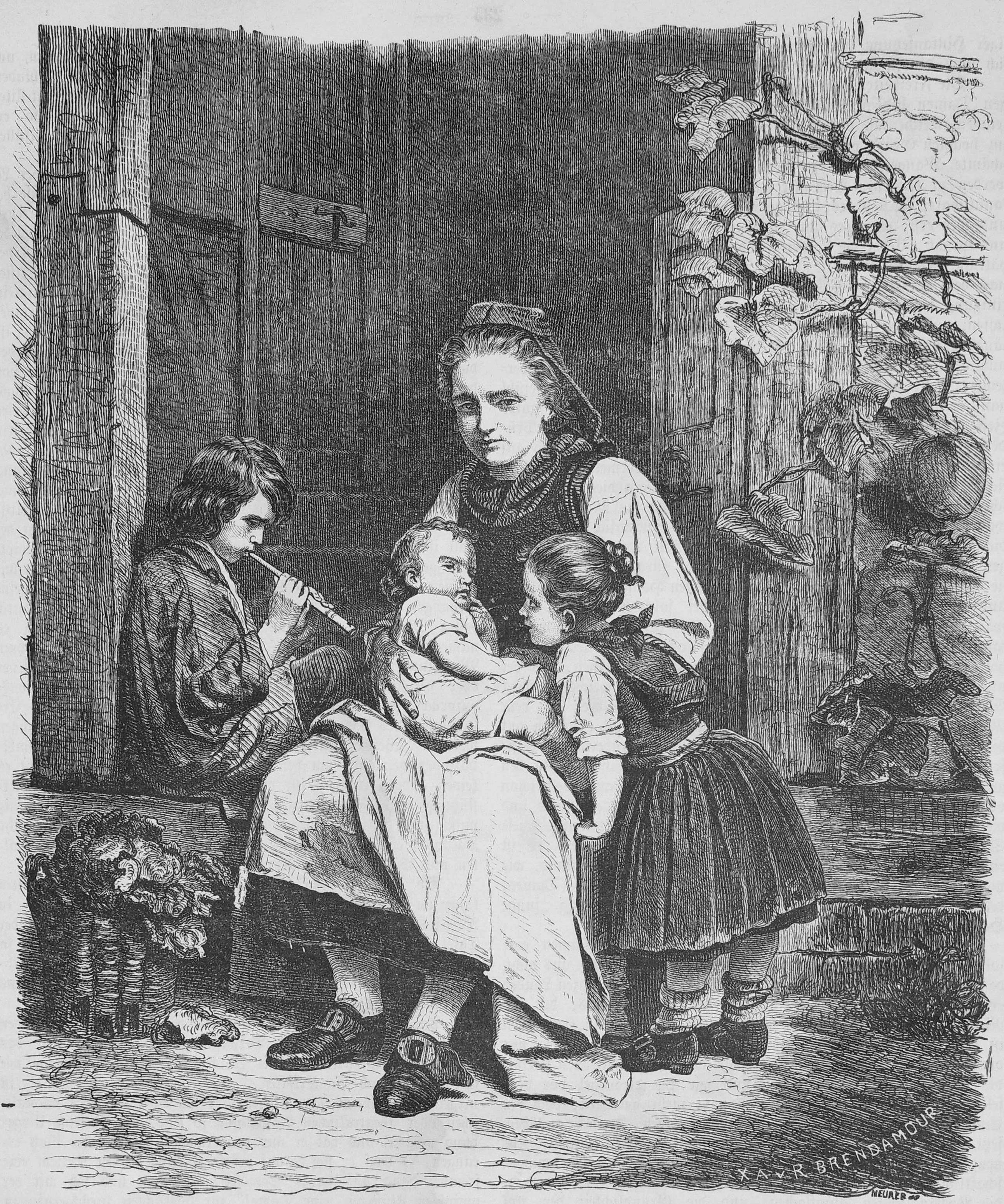
Die Gartenlaube (1866)

== Selected works ==
- Apothéose de Henri IV, 1858, Kopie nach Peter Paul Rubens (Paris, AMN c)
- Portrait de jeune Femme, Verbleib unbekannt (Salon 1859, Nr. 497)
- Le Tannhaeuser, Verbleib unbekannt (ebd., Nr. 496; Boetticher)
- Tintoretto und seine Tochter, Verbleib unbekannt (Boetticher).
- Kinderlust (1862, Dresdener Galerie)
- Bei der jungen Witwe (gestochen von Vogel)
- Heimkehr von der Kirchweih
- Der Dorfarzt in Verlegenheit
- Hinter der Mühle
- Des alten Schullehrers Geburtstag (1866, Nationalgalerie in Berlin)
- Die Verhaftung (1872);
- Verwaist (1874)
- Singende Mädchen am Waldessaum (1875)
- Schloss Mühlenthal (1875)
- David und Jonathan (Kunstmuseum Düsseldorf)
- Schwäbisches Hochzeitsmal (Stiftung Sammlung Vollmer)
- Baronin von Knoop (Stiftung Sammlung Vollmer)
- Baron von Knoop (Stiftung Sammlung Vollmer)
- Gustav Bunge (1872)
- August Bolten (1883)
- Adolph Godeffroy (1882)

== Literature ==
- Eva Knels: Lasch, Carl Johann In: Savoy, Bénédicte und Nerlich, France (Hrsg.): Pariser Lehrjahre. Ein Lexikon zur Ausbildung deutscher Maler in der französischen Hauptstadt. Band 2: 1844–1870. Berlin/Boston 2015.
