= Edward T. Robertson & Son =

Multinational cotton company

- Company type: Privately held company
- Industry: Cotton industry
- Founded: 1906; 119 years ago
- Founder: Edward Twells Robertson
- Defunct: 1993
- Headquarters: Bremen, Germany
- Area served: Europe and America
- Products: Cotton

Edward T. Robertson & Son (ETR) was a German-American company in the cotton industry that was an international exporter and importer of cotton also known as an international cotton controller. The company existed from 1906 to 1993. During its operating it was a member of the American Cotton Shippers Association.

== History ==
The company was established in Bremen, Germany, as a cotton controlling company by Edward Twells Robertson (1853–1914) of Charleston, South Carolina and his son, also named Edward Twells Robertson (b. 1885), who had moved to Bremen in 1905 following the marriage of his sister Mary to the leading Bremen cotton merchant Carl Albrecht in 1902.

The company opened branches in several countries and became one of the largest firms in the international cotton trade. The North Carolina government noted in 1953 that "to the world's cotton trade, Edward T. Robertson & Son stands in relatively the same position as Tiffany to the jewelry business. It is virtually a household word."

As late as 1983 it was described as the leading cotton controlling company of the time. The company ceased operating in 1993.
