= Peggy Schierenbeck =

German politician

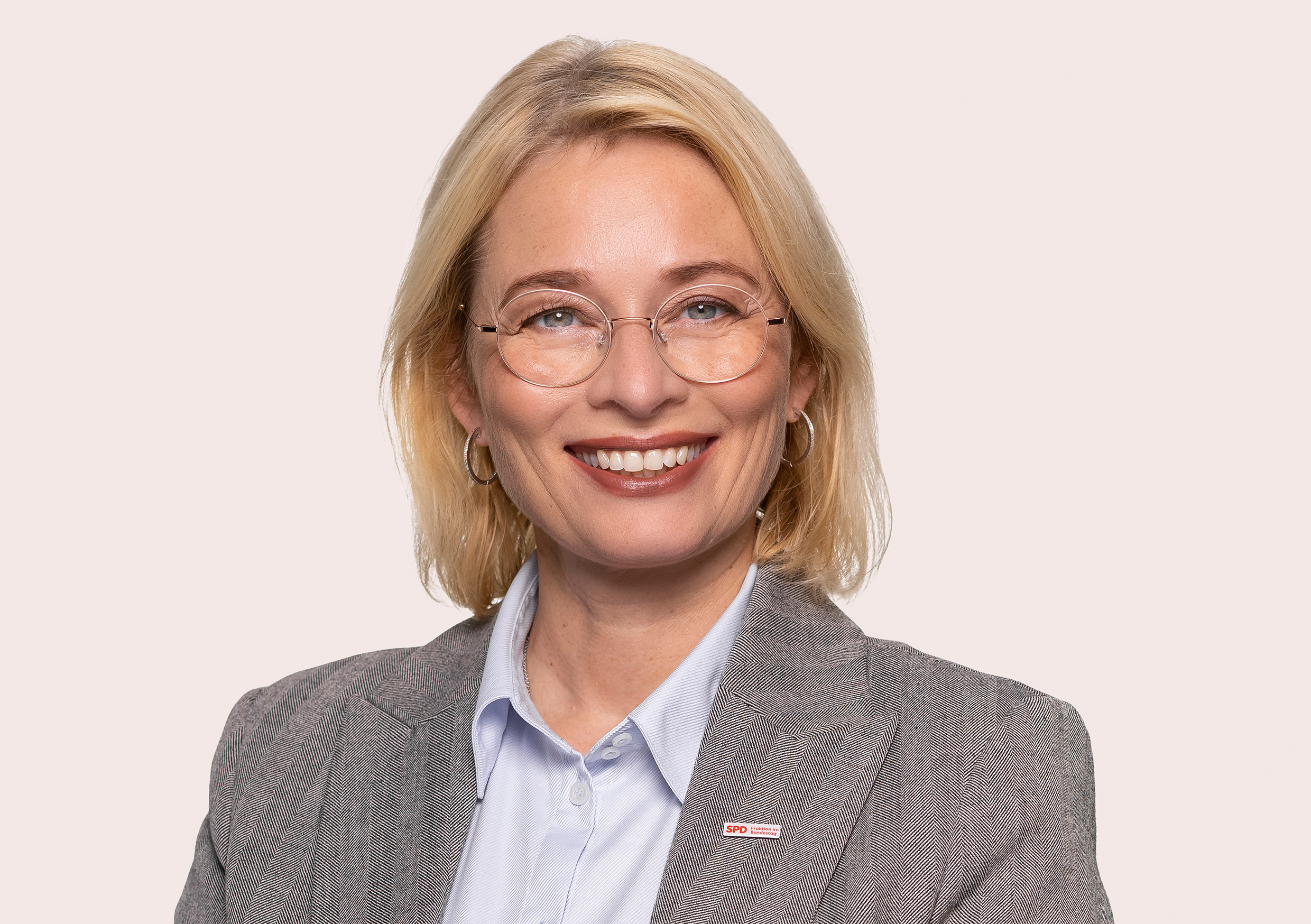

Member of the Bundestag
- In office 2021–2025

Personal details
- Born: 9 October 1970 (age 55) Neuwied, West Germany
- Party: SPD

Peggy Schierenbeck (born 9 October 1970) is a German politician of the Social Democratic Party (SPD) who was a Member of the German Bundestag from Lower Saxony from 2021 to 2025.

== Early life ==
Schierenbeck was born in Neuwied.

== Political career ==
Schierenbeck contested the constituency of Diepholz – Nienburg I in the 2021 German federal election.

In parliament, Schierenbeck served on the Committee on Internal Affairs and Community and the Committee on Food and Agriculture. In addition to her committee assignments, she became a member of the German delegation to the Franco-German Parliamentary Assembly in 2022.

Schierenbeck was a candidate in the 2025 German federal election but was unseated.
