= Carl Albrecht (businessman) =

German businessman (1875–1952)

- Born: 15 September 1875; Bremen, Germany
- Died: December 24, 1952 (aged 77); Charleston, South Carolina, U.S.
- Occupation: Businessman
- Spouse: Mary Ladson Robertson
- Parent(s): George Alexander Albrecht (father) and Louise Dorothea Betty Knoop (mother)
- Relatives: Carl Albrecht (son); George Alexander Albrecht and of the politician Ernst Albrecht (grandsons); Ursula von der Leyen (great-granddaughter) Hans-Holger Albrecht and the conductor Marc Albrecht (great-grandsons)

Friedrich Carl Albrecht (15 September 1875 – 24 December 1952) was a major cotton merchant in the city-state of Bremen.

== Biography ==
He was the son of the wealthy cotton merchant George Alexander Albrecht (1834–1898) and Louise Dorothea Betty Knoop (1844–1889). His father was the owner of the company Johann Lange Sohn's Wwe. & Co.; his mother was the daughter of the major industrialist, Baron Ludwig Knoop, one of the most successful entrepreneurs of the 19th century Russian Empire.

Following his military service from 1894 to 1895, he undertook an apprenticeship with the firm Gebrüder Plate (Plate Brothers). From 1896 to 1901, he lived in London, Moscow and the United States. In 1901, he joined the firm Sanders, Swann & Co., and in 1902, he founded his own company Friedrich Carl Albrecht with his partner Heinrich Müller-Pearse. The two also founded the Boston-based company Albrecht, Weld & Co. in cooperation with the American firm Stephen M. Weld & Co. In 1902, he founded Albrecht, Müller-Pearse & Co.

In 1902, he married the American Mary Ladson Robertson (1883–1960), who belonged to a prominent planter class and slave owner Ladson family from Charleston, Charleston County, South Carolina. Her family tree is full of governors, plantation owners, and slave owners. Thomas Jefferson, the third president of the United States, was among them.

Mary and Friedrich Carl Albrecht were the parents of the psychologist Carl Albrecht and the grandparents of the conductor George Alexander Albrecht and of the politician Ernst Albrecht. Among their great-grandchildren are the politician Ursula von der Leyen (née Albrecht), who lived for a year in London under the name Rose Ladson, the businessman Hans-Holger Albrecht and the conductor Marc Albrecht.

His wife was the older sister of the cotton merchant Edward T. Robertson, who moved to Bremen in 1905 to establish Edward T. Robertson & Son.
