= George Alexander Albrecht (businessman) =

German merchant (1834–1898)

George Alexander Albrecht (2 August 1834 – 24 November 1898) was a German cotton merchant in the city-state of Bremen. He was also noted as a philanthropist.

== Biography ==
Albrecht belonged to an old patrician family from the Electorate and Kingdom of Hanover, and was a son of the Hanoverian State Councillor and lawyer Karl Franz Georg Albrecht (1799–1873). He undertook an apprenticeship with the Bremen firm Johann Lange Sohn's Wwe. & Co. and later became a partner. He was a member of the boards of directors of several other companies, and in 1895 he was appointed as the Austro-Hungarian Consul.

In 1864, he married Louise Dorothea Betty von Knoop (1844–1889), the daughter of the major industrialist, Baron Ludwig Johann von Knoop. They were the parents of the cotton merchant Carl Albrecht, and among their descendants are the psychologist Carl Albrecht, the conductor George Alexander Albrecht, the politicians Ernst Albrecht and Ursula von der Leyen (née Albrecht), and the conductor Marc Albrecht.

His philanthropic activities focused on the promotion of geographical science. He was a co-founder and President of the Geographical Society in Bremen, and he supported the German North Polar Expedition and other Arctic expeditions.

A street in Bremen and a bay on the eastern coast of Greenland were named in his honour.
