= 1990 Lower Saxony state election =

← 1986	13 May 1990	1994 →

All 155 seats in the Landtag of Lower Saxony 78 seats needed for a majority
- Turnout: 4,216,296 (74.6%) ▼2.7%
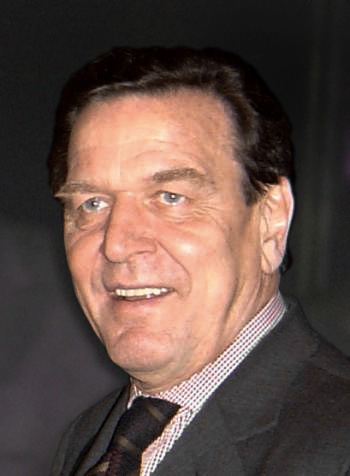

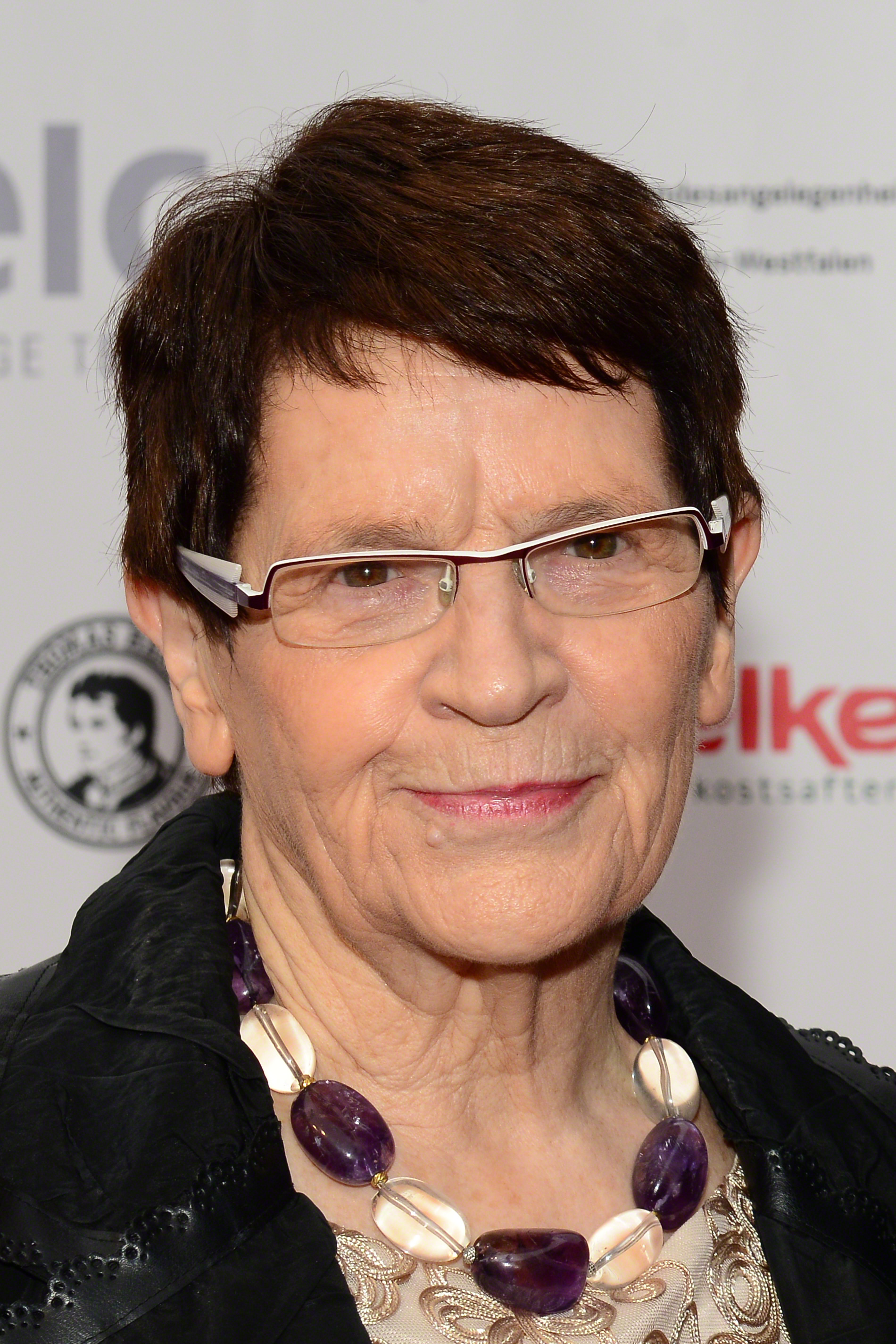
	First party	Second party
Leader	Gerhard Schröder	Rita Süssmuth
Party	SPD	CDU
Last election	66 seats, 42.1%	69 seats, 44.3%
Seats won	71	67
Seat change	▲5	▼2
Popular vote	1,865,267	1,771,974
Percentage	44.2%	42.0%
Swing	▲2.1%	▼2.3%
	Third party	Fourth party
Party	FDP	Greens
Last election	9 seats, 6.0%	11 seats, 7.1%
Seats won	9	8
Seat change	0	▼3
Popular vote	252,615	229,846
Percentage	6.0%	5.5%
Swing	0.0%	▼1.6%
- Results for the single-member constituencies
Minister-President before election
Ernst Albrecht
CDU
Elected Minister-President
Gerhard Schröder
SPD

The 1990 Lower Saxony state election was held on 13 May 1990 to elect the members of the 12th Landtag of Lower Saxony. The incumbent coalition government of the Christian Democratic Union (CDU) and Free Democratic Party (FDP) led by Minister-President Ernst Albrecht was defeated. The Social Democratic Party (SPD) subsequently formed a coalition with The Greens, and SPD leader Gerhard Schröder was elected Minister-President.

== Parties ==
The table below lists parties represented in the 11th Landtag of Lower Saxony.

Name		Ideology	Leader(s)	1986 result	
Name		Ideology	Leader(s)	Votes (%)	Seats
CDU	Christian Democratic Union of Germany; Christlich Demokratische Union Deutschlands	Christian democracy	Rita Süssmuth	44.3%	69 / 155
SPD	Social Democratic Party of Germany; Sozialdemokratische Partei Deutschlands	Social democracy	Gerhard Schröder	42.1%	66 / 155
Grüne	The Greens; Die Grünen	Green politics		7.1%	11 / 155
FDP	Free Democratic Party; Freie Demokratische Partei	Classical liberalism		6.0%	9 / 155

== Election result ==
Summary of the 13 May 1990 election results for the Landtag of Lower Saxony
Party	Votes	%	+/-	Seats	+/-	Seats %
Social Democratic Party (SPD)	1,865,267	44.2	▲2.1	71	▲5	45.8
Christian Democratic Union (CDU)	1,771,974	42.0	▼2.3	67	▼2	43.2
Free Democratic Party (FDP)	252,615	6.0	0.0	9	±0	5.8
Alliance 90/The Greens (Grüne)	229,846	5.5	▼1.6	8	▼3	5.2
The Republicans (REP)	62,054	1.5	▲1.5	0	±0	0
Others	34,540	0.8		0	±0	0
Total	4,216,296	100.0		155	±0	
Voter turnout		74.6	▼2.7			

Popular Vote
SPD	44.24%
CDU	42.03%
FDP	5.99%
GRÜNE	5.45%
Other	2.29%

Landtag seats
SPD	45.81%
CDU	43.23%
FDP	5.81%
GRÜNE	5.16%

== Sources ==
- Landtagswahlen in Niedersachsen
