= Ernst Albrecht (politician, born 1930) =

German politician (1930–2014)

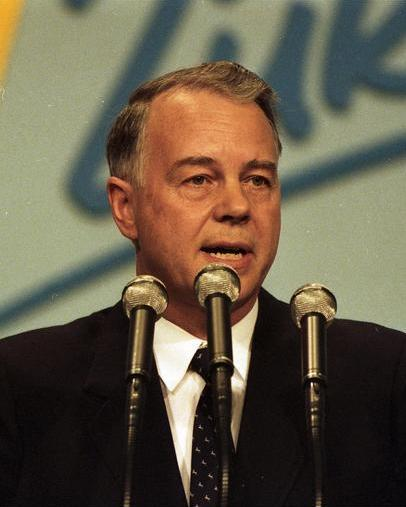
- Albrecht in 1988

Minister-President of Lower Saxony
- In office 6 February 1976 – 21 June 1990
- Deputy: Wilfried Hasselmann; Rötger Groß; Wilfried Hasselmann; Josef Stock
- Preceded by: Alfred Kubel
- Succeeded by: Gerhard Schröder

President of the Bundesrat
- In office 1 November 1985 – 31 October 1986
- First Vice President: Lothar Späth
- Preceded by: Lothar Späth
- Succeeded by: Holger Börner

Director-General of the Directorate-General for Competition
- In office 1967–1970

Member of the Landtag of Lower Saxony
- In office 22 June 1982 – 21 June 1990
- Preceded by: Hans-Jürgen Mellentin
- Succeeded by: Lutz von der Heide
- Constituency: Burgdorf
- In office 10 July 1974 – 22 June 1982
- Preceded by: Werner Evers
- Succeeded by: Constituency abolished
- Constituency: Wietze
- In office 20 June 1970 – 10 July 1974
- Preceded by: multi-member district
- Succeeded by: multi-member district
- Constituency: Christian Democratic Union List

Personal details
- Born: Ernst Carl Julius Albrecht; 29 June 1930 Heidelberg, Republic of Baden, Weimar Republic (now Germany)
- Died: 13 December 2014 (aged 84) Burgdorf-Beinhorn, Lower Saxony, Germany
- Party: Christian Democratic Union
- Spouse: Adele Stromeyer (m. 1953; died 2002)
- Children: 7, including Ursula and Hans-Holger
- Parent: Carl Albrecht (father)
- Relatives: Albrecht family
- Education: University of Tübingen; University of Bonn
- Occupation: Politician; Economist; Lawyer; Businessman

Ernst Carl Julius Albrecht (29 June 1930 – 13 December 2014) was a German politician of the Christian Democratic Union and a former high-ranking European civil servant. He was one of the first European civil servants appointed in 1958 and served as director-general of the Directorate-General for Competition from 1967 to 1970. He served as Minister President of the state of Lower Saxony from 1976 to 1990. He was the father of the politician Ursula von der Leyen, the President of the European Commission.

== Background ==
Ernst Albrecht was born in Heidelberg, the son of the psychologist, psychotherapist and medical doctor Carl Albrecht, who was known for developing a new method of meditation; the Albrecht family had been among the hübsche ("genteel") families of the Electorate of Hanover as doctors, jurists and civil servants since the 17th century, but his immediate ancestors had been wealthy cotton merchants in Bremen and members of the city-state's Hanseatic elite in the 19th and 20th centuries. His grandmother Mary Ladson Robertson was an American of prominent planter class origin from Charleston, South Carolina, and a descendant of James H. Ladson and several colonial governors.

== European Commission, 1958–1970 ==
Ernst Albrecht studied law and economics. In 1958 he moved to Brussels where he became one of the first European civil servants. He initially served as the Chef de Cabinet to the European Commissioner for Competition Hans von der Groeben in the Hallstein Commission, and in 1967, at the age of 37, he became the Director-General of the Directorate-General for Competition.

== Business and political career ==
Albrecht entered politics in his native Germany when he was elected to the Lower Saxon Landtag (parliament) in 1970, and moved to Hanover with his family the following year. From 1971 to 1976, he was member of the management board of Bahlsen.

When Alfred Kubel resigned from the office of State Premier in 1976, Albrecht was unexpectedly elected as his successor. Since he received three more votes than his party had representatives in the Legislative Assembly, some members of the governing coalition SPD and FDP must have secretly voted for him. He was re-elected in state parliament elections in 1978, 1982 and 1986. In 1976, Albrecht made Hans Puvogel his minister of justice. During his tenure, Puvogel was particularly active in combatting notions of more liberal penal and rehabilitation systems. He had already set out justification for his stance in a 1935-1936 doctoral thesis. There, he wrote of the “inheritance of criminal tendencies”, of “constitutionally predisposed criminals” and “inferior people”, who would have to be “eliminated from the community”. “Only a person of value to the race” would have “a right to exist within the national community”.

The state government under Ernst Albrecht used every opportunity to court former Nazis. In a 1978 speech, Deputy Premier Wilfried Hasselmann (CDU) greeted the Association of Knight's Cross Recipients, a league of former Wehrmacht (Hitler's army) officers and SS men, certifying that they had “shown courage and given an example to others”. Hasselmann declared he was “deeply impressed by the solidarity of your order. You have fulfilled your duty as soldiers in an exemplary manner. This will continue to be evident to a younger generation”.

Albrecht is known for the decision to make the County of Lüchow-Dannenberg the state's "nuclear district" where the radioactive waste dump at Gorleben was realized. During his tenure Albrecht was embroiled in an unusually large number of political scandals; most famously, the false flag operation ″Celle Hole″ by the federal intelligence agency and the special forces GSG 9 to lay blame on the militant left-wing Red Army Faction.

In 1980, Albrecht launched a campaign for election as Chancellor, but he lost out to fellow conservative Franz-Josef Strauß. Albrecht did not contest the 1990 state elections. Instead, then-President of the Bundestag and Göttingen Member of the German Bundestag Rita Süssmuth was lead candidate. They had an agreement whereby, if re-elected, Albrecht would continue as Minister-President until 1992, then Süssmuth would take over. Süssmuth lost the 1990 state elections to Gerhard Schröder, who later became Chancellor.

== Personal life ==
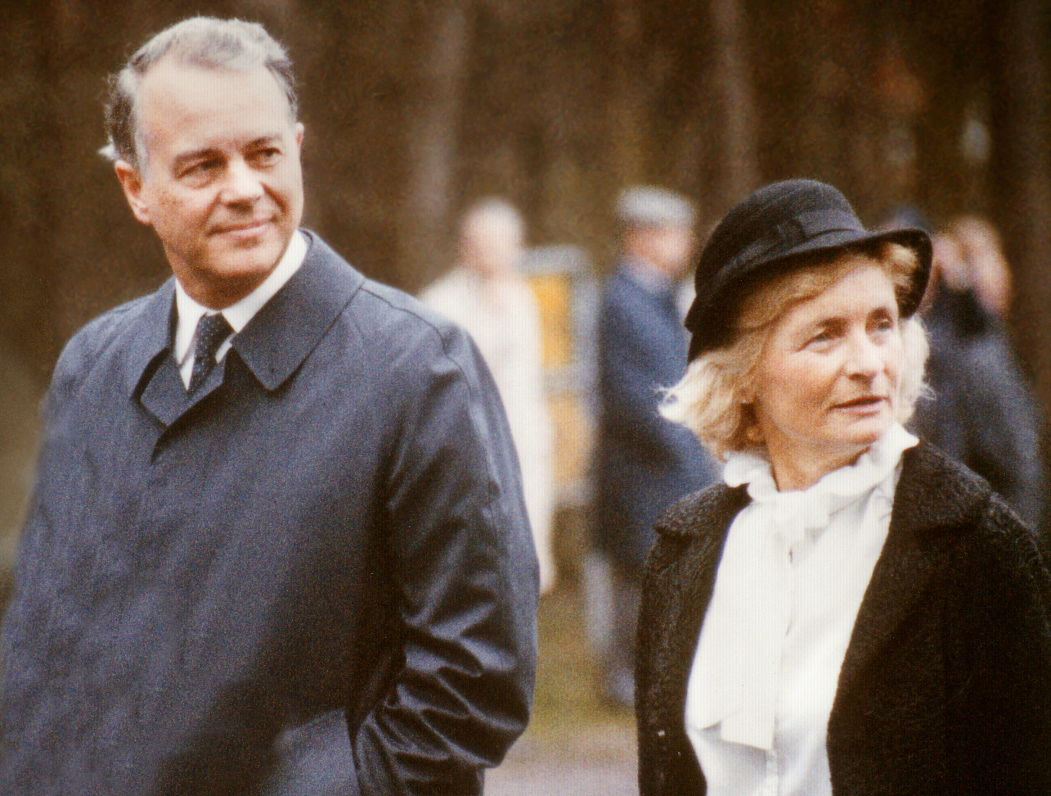
Ernst and Adele Albrecht (1985)

Albrecht married Heidi Adele Stromeyer (1928–2002) in 1953. They had seven children, among them politician Ursula von der Leyen and Hans-Holger Albrecht, President & CEO of the international telecom and media group Deezer. A daughter died at age 11 and one son at age 49 of cancer.

His brother was George Alexander Albrecht, a conductor. Ernst Albrecht had Alzheimer's disease since 2003, which was announced to the public in 2008. He died at the age of 84 in Burgdorf in December 2014.

== Ancestry ==
Ancestors of Ernst Albrecht (politician, born 1930)

8. George Alexander Albrecht (1834–1898), Consul, cotton merchant, of Bremen
4. Carl Albrecht (1875–1952), cotton merchant, of Bremen
9. Louise von Knoop (1844–1889)
2. Carl Albrecht, psychologist, physician
10. Edward Twells Robertson (1855–1914), cotton merchant, of Charleston, Charleston County. SC
5. Mary Ladson Robertson (1883–1960), of Charleston, Charleston County, SC
11. Sara Gilmor Ladson (1858–1895), of Charleston, Charleston County, uSC
1. Ernst Albrecht
12.
13.
3. Adelheid "Adda" Berg
14.

== See also ==
- Cabinet Albrecht V

Political offices
Preceded by Alfred Kubel	Prime Minister of Lower Saxony; 1976–1990	Succeeded by Gerhard Schröder
