= Carl Albrecht (psychologist) =

German psychologist and physician

Carl Eduard Albrecht (28 March 1902, Bremen – 19 July 1965, Leuchtenburg) was a German psychologist, psychotherapist and physician, who developed a new method of meditation based on autogenic training, and who was known for his psychological research on mystical consciousness.

== Life ==
Albrecht belonged to a family of wealthy cotton merchants; his father was the cotton merchant Carl Albrecht (1875–1952) and his mother was the American-born Mary Ladson Robertson (1883–1960), who belonged to a prominent planter family from South Carolina. His father was a grandson of Baron Ludwig Knoop, one of the leading industrialists of the Russian Empire in his lifetime.

He was the father of the conductor George Alexander Albrecht and of the politician Ernst Albrecht, and the paternal grandfather of the President of the European Commission Ursula von der Leyen (née Albrecht) and the conductor Marc Albrecht.

== Work ==
Albrecht was a physician and psychotherapist, and is known for developing a new method of meditation based on autogenic training. His psychological research on mystical consciousness culminated in his 1951 book Psychologie des Mystischen Bewußtseins; new editions were published in German in 1976, 1990 and 2018, and an annotated English edition titled Psychology of Mystical Consciousness was published in 2019 with an introduction by Franz K. Woehrer. Woehrer notes that "Albrecht's results are unique in that they derive from a pioneering methodological approach based on 'Autogenic Training', which enabled a practitioner to verbalize spontaneously what he/she is experiencing while immersed in an altered state of consciousness."

His work is cited as an influence on Gabriel Marcel and Karl Rahner.

== Bibliography ==
- Psychologie des mystischen Bewußtseins. Bremen 1951
  - Published in English as Psychology of Mystical Consciousness, Crossroad Publishing Company, 2019
- Das mystische Erkennen. Gnoseologie und philosophische Relevanz der mystischen Relation. Bremen 1958.
- Carl Albrecht: Das mystische Wort. Erleben und Sprechen in Versunkenheit. Edited by Hans A. Fischer-Barnicol, with an introduction by Karl Rahner. Mainz 1974.

== Ancestry ==
Ancestors of Carl Albrecht (psychologist)

16. Franz August Heinrich Albrecht
8. Karl Franz Georg Albrecht (1799–1873), State Councillor
17. Helene Elisabeth Henriette Rautenberg
4. George Alexander Albrecht (1834–1898), Consul, cotton merchant, of Bremen
18. Karl Philipp Heinrich Giffenig
9. Katharina Franziska Giffenig (1811–1870)
19. Therese Cäcile Bianchi
2. Carl Albrecht (1875–1952), cotton merchant, of Bremen
20. Gerhard Knoop
10. Baron Ludwig Knoop
21. Anna Rebecca (Betty) Fredrichs
5. Louise Albrecht (1844–1889)
22. Johann Christoph Hoyer
11. Louise Mathilde Hoyer
23. Dorothee Folkmann
1. Carl Albrecht
24. William Robertson
12. Lieutenant Lewis Ford Robertson (1825–1904)
25. Pamela Mosely
6. Edward Twells Robertson (1855–1914), cotton merchant, of Charleston, Charleston County, SC
26. Edward Twells
13. Sarah Twells (1825–1894)
27. Sarah Wharton
3. Mary Ladson Robertson (1883–1960), of Charleston, Charleston County, SC
28. James Henry Ladson
14. Major William Henry Ladson (1829–1861), a Confederate Officer in the American Secession War
29. Eliza Ann Fraser
7. Sara Gilmor Ladson (1858–1895), of Charleston, Charleston County, SC
30. John McPherson Brien (1807–)
15. Isabel Ann Brien (1834–1911)
31. Isabel Ann Baron (1817–)
