= Axel Knoerig =

German politician

Axel Knoerig MdB
- Knoerig in 2024

Member of the Bundestag; for Diepholz – Nienburg I
- Incumbent
- Assumed office 27 October 2009
- Preceded by: Rolf Kramer

Personal details
- Born: 1 March 1967 (age 59) Bassum, West Germany
- Party: Christian Democratic Union
- Children: 1
- Education: University of Bonn

Axel Knoerig (born 1 March 1967) is a German politician of the Christian Democratic Union (CDU) who has been serving as a member of the Bundestag from the state of Lower Saxony since 2009.

== Political career ==
Knoerig became a member of the Bundestag after the 2009 German federal election, representing the Diepholz – Nienburg I constituency. He served on the Committee on Education, Research and Technology Assessment from 2009 until 2013 before moving to the Committee on Economic Affairs and Energy in 2014.

In addition to his committee assignments, Knoerig is part of the German Parliamentary Friendship Group with the Baltic States (since 2013) and German Parliamentary Friendship Group for Relations with the Southern African States (since 2018).

== Political positions ==
In June 2017, Knoerig voted against Germany's introduction of same-sex marriage.
