= Deutsches Geschlechterbuch =

German genealogical handbook

The Deutsches Geschlechterbuch, until 1943 known as the Genealogisches Handbuch bürgerlicher Familien, is a major German genealogical handbook of bourgeois or patrician families. It is the bourgeois and patrician equivalent of the Genealogisches Handbuch des Adels and the former Almanach de Gotha. It includes genealogies and coats of arms of the included families. The Genealogisches Handbuch bürgerlicher Familien was started in 1889 and prior to 1943, 119 volumes covering around 1,200 families were published under the original title. From 1956, the series were continued under the title Deutsches Geschlechterbuch. In 2007, the 219th and latest volume was published. In total, around 4,000 families have been covered.

The Hamburgisches Geschlechterbuch, comprising 17 volumes on the Hanseatic families of Hamburg, is an integral part of the work, and is regarded as the most comprehensive reference work of its kind on a single city.

The publication has been highly influential and inspired several similar publications, such as Nederland's Patriciaat. To some extent it corresponds to Burke's Landed Gentry in the United Kingdom, although it could also be said to be the equivalent of Burke's Peerage in its coverage of Hanseatic and patrician families who comprised the highest class in the former city-republics.

== Bibliography ==
- Genealogisches Handbuch bürgerlicher Familien (1889–1943)
- Deutsches Geschlechterbuch (1956-)
