= 1986 Lower Saxony state election =

← 1982	15 June 1986	1990 →

All 155 seats in the Landtag of Lower Saxony 78 seats needed for a majority
- Turnout: 4,320,347 (77.3%) ▼0.4%
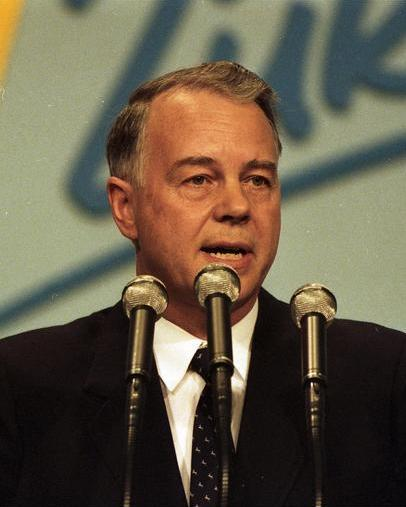

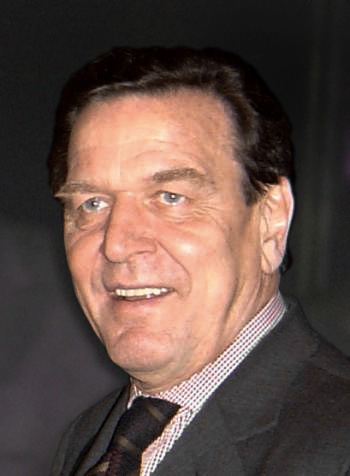
	First party	Second party
Leader	Ernst Albrecht	Gerhard Schröder
Party	CDU	SPD
Last election	87 seats, 50.7%	63 seats, 36.5%
Seats won	69	66
Seat change	▼18	▲3
Popular vote	1,903,559	1,807,157
Percentage	44.3%	42.1%
Swing	▼6.4%	▲5.6%
	Third party	Fourth party
Party	Greens	FDP
Last election	11 seats, 6.5%	10 seats, 5.9%
Seats won	11	9
Seat change	Steady	▼1
Popular vote	303,308	257,873
Percentage	7.1%	6.0%
Swing	▲0.6%	▲0.1%
- Results for the single-member constituencies
Minister-President before election
Ernst Albrecht
CDU
Elected Minister-President
Ernst Albrecht
CDU

The 1986 Lower Saxony state election was held on 15 June 1986 to elect the members of the 11th Landtag of Lower Saxony. The election result was reportedly affected by the Chernobyl disaster, which occurred in late April of that year.

== Background ==
In the 1982 state elections, the Christian Democratic Union (CDU) under Minister-President of Lower Saxony Ernst Albrecht achieved its best result ever in Lower Saxony with 50.7 percent of the vote, while the Social Democratic Party (SPD) under Karl Ravens suffered heavy losses.

Since this was already Ravens' second loss against Albrecht, he decided not to run as a candidate again in 1986.

When the SPD was looking for a candidate, the SPD leadership originally favoured former Federal Minister Anke Fuchs. However, after the former Federal Chairman of the Juso and then-Hanoverian MP Gerhard Schröder announced his candidacy and secured the support of several SPD district associations, Fuchs gave up being top candidate.

There were some disputes within the SPD over the coalition question: While chancellor candidate Johannes Rau had ruled out a coalition with the Greens for the federal election planned for January 1987 and was counting on the SPD having its own majority, Schröder did not want to rule out a red-green coalition in general.

The disputes between Rau and Schröder on this issue were one of the election campaign issues.

== Parties and candidates ==
The state electoral committee approved 706 candidates (567 men and 139 women). The 623 district nominations consisted of 508 men and 115 women from 10 parties and individual candidates, the 389 state nominations consisted of 309 men and 80 women. Of these, 306 (56 women) also ran for a district nomination.

No.	Party/individual candidate	Number of constituency candidates
1	Christian Democratic Union of Germany	100
2	Social Democratic Party of Germany	100
3	DIE GRÜNEN	100
4	Free Democratic Party	100
4	Patriots for Germany	100
5	German Communist Party	84
7	The Whites	32
8	Citizens' Party	1
9	German Solidarity	1
10	Young Voters Association of Lower Saxony	1
11	Independents	4
total number of approved district election proposals		623

== Results ==
While the CDU lost its absolute majority, the SPD again exceeded the 40 percent mark thanks to significant gains. In addition, around a third of the CDU's direct mandates went to the SPD. The Greens and the FDP only recorded minimal gains. Even though there was renewed circulation of candidacies from the other parties and some new parties were eligible, the small parties again received less than one percent of the votes together. The DKP's votes also halved compared to the last election.

Party	Votes	%	+/–	Seats	+/–
Christian Democratic Union	1,903,559	44.34	−6.35	69	−18
Social Democratic Party	1,807,157	42.09	+5.56	66	+3
The Greens	303,308	7.06	+0.52	11	0
Free Democratic Party	257,873	6.01	+0.10	9	−1
Patriots for Germany	11,284	0.26	New	0	New
German Communist Party	5,690	0.13	−0.15	0	0
The Whites	3,858	0.09	New	0	New
Citizens' Party	198	0.00	+0.00	0	0
German Solidarity	38	0.00	New	0	New
Young Voters Association	17	0.00	New	0	New
Independents	164	0.00	+0.00	0	0
Total	4,293,146	100.00	–	155	−16
Valid votes	4,293,146	99.37			
Invalid/blank votes	27,201	0.63			
Total votes	4,320,347	100.00			
Registered voters/turnout	5,588,597	77.31			

== Formation of a government ==
The CDU formed a coalition with the FDP, which had a majority of one vote. Albrecht was then confirmed as Minister President. Schröder resigned from his Bundestag mandate and moved into state politics as SPD parliamentary group leader and opposition leader.

In December 1988, a constructive vote of no confidence against Albrecht, brought by the SPD parliamentary group because of the casino affair, failed by 76 votes to 79. At least one member of the opposition parties SPD and Greens must have voted for Albrecht.

== See also ==
- List of members of the Lower Saxony State Parliament (11th electoral term)
