= Diepholz – Nienburg I =

Federal electoral district of Germany

33 Diepholz – Nienburg I
- Electoral district for the Bundestag
- Diepholz – Nienburg I in 2025
- State: Lower Saxony
- Population: 247,900 (2019)
- Electorate: 194,371 (2021)
- Major settlements: Syke; Diepholz
- Area: 2,490.9 km^{2}

Current electoral district
- Created: 1949
- Party: CDU
- Member: Axel Knoerig
- Elected: 2009, 2013, 2017, 2021, 2025

Diepholz – Nienburg I is an electoral constituency (German: Wahlkreis) represented in the Bundestag. It elects one member via first-past-the-post voting. Under the current constituency numbering system, it is designated as constituency 33. It is located in central Lower Saxony, comprising the Diepholz district and parts of the Nienburg district.

Diepholz – Nienburg I was created for the inaugural 1949 federal election. Since 2009, it has been represented by Axel Knoerig of the Christian Democratic Union (CDU).

== Geography ==
Diepholz – Nienburg I is located in central Lower Saxony. As of the 2021 federal election, it comprises the entirety of the Diepholz district as well as the Samtgemeinden of Grafschaft Hoya and Uchte from the Nienburg district.

== History ==
Diepholz – Nienburg I was created in 1949, then known as Diepholz – Melle – Wittlage. In the 1965 through 1976 elections, it was named Nienburg. From 1980 through 1998, it was named Diepholz. It acquired its current name in the 2002 election. In the inaugural Bundestag election, it was Lower Saxony constituency 23 in the numbering system. From 1953 through 1961, it was number 45. From 1965 through 1976, it was number 34. From 1980 through 1998, it was number 28. From 2002 through 2009, it was number 34. Since 2013, it has been constituency 33.

Originally, the constituency comprised the districts of Grafschaft Diepholz, Melle, and Wittlage. It also included part of the Nienburg district, specifically the territory which now comprises the Samtgemeinde of Uchte. In the 1965 election, the entirety of the Nienburg district was transferred to the constituency. In the 1980 election, the area of the abolished Melle and Wittlage districts was transferred away, as was the Nienburg district. From then until 2002, the constituency comprised only the district of Diepholz. It acquired its current borders in the 2002 election.

Election	No.	Name	Borders
1949	23	Diepholz – Melle – Wittlage	Grafschaft Diepholz district; Melle district; Nienburg district (only Uchte Samtgemeinde); Wittlage district
1953	45	Diepholz – Melle – Wittlage	Grafschaft Diepholz district; Melle district; Nienburg district (only Uchte Samtgemeinde); Wittlage district
1957	45	Diepholz – Melle – Wittlage	Grafschaft Diepholz district; Melle district; Nienburg district (only Uchte Samtgemeinde); Wittlage district
1961	45	Diepholz – Melle – Wittlage	Grafschaft Diepholz district; Melle district; Nienburg district (only Uchte Samtgemeinde); Wittlage district
1965	34	Nienburg	Grafschaft Diepholz district; Melle district; Nienburg district; Wittlage district
1969	34	Nienburg	Grafschaft Diepholz district; Melle district; Nienburg district; Wittlage district
1972	34	Nienburg	Grafschaft Diepholz district; Melle district; Nienburg district; Wittlage district
1976	34	Nienburg	Grafschaft Diepholz district; Melle district; Nienburg district; Wittlage district
1980	28	Diepholz	Diepholz district
1983	28	Diepholz	Diepholz district
1987	28	Diepholz	Diepholz district
1990	28	Diepholz	Diepholz district
1994	28	Diepholz	Diepholz district
1998	28	Diepholz	Diepholz district
2002	34	Diepholz – Nienburg I	Diepholz district; Nienburg district (only Grafschaft Hoya and Uchte Samtgemeinden)
2005	34	Diepholz – Nienburg I	Diepholz district; Nienburg district (only Grafschaft Hoya and Uchte Samtgemeinden)
2009	34	Diepholz – Nienburg I	Diepholz district; Nienburg district (only Grafschaft Hoya and Uchte Samtgemeinden)
2013	33	Diepholz – Nienburg I	Diepholz district; Nienburg district (only Grafschaft Hoya and Uchte Samtgemeinden)
2017	33	Diepholz – Nienburg I	Diepholz district; Nienburg district (only Grafschaft Hoya and Uchte Samtgemeinden)
2021	33	Diepholz – Nienburg I	Diepholz district; Nienburg district (only Grafschaft Hoya and Uchte Samtgemeinden)
2025	33	Diepholz – Nienburg I	Diepholz district; Nienburg district (only Grafschaft Hoya and Uchte Samtgemeinden)

== Members ==
The constituency was first held by Rudolf Eickhoff of the German Party (DP), who served from 1949 until 1957. He was succeeded by Karl Gossel of the Christian Democratic Union (CDU), who served two terms. Fellow CDU members Günter von Nordenskjöld (1965–72) and Richard Ey (1972–80) then each served two terms. In 1980, the Social Democratic Party (SPD) won the constituency, and Peter Würtz was its representative for a single term. The CDU's Walter Link regained it in 1983, and served until 1998. In 1998, the SPD's Detlev von Larcher won, and served a single term. Rolf Kramer of the SPD was representative from 2002 to 2009. Axel Knoerig of the CDU has served as representative since 2009.

Election	Member	Party	%
1949	Rudolf Eickhoff	DP	34.2
1953	Rudolf Eickhoff	DP	26.7
1957	Karl Gossel	CDU	30.5
1961	Karl Gossel	CDU	35.4
1965	Günter von Nordenskjöld	CDU	45.1
1969	Günter von Nordenskjöld	CDU	46.4
1972	Richard Ey	CDU	45.5
1976	Richard Ey	CDU	49.2
1980	Peter Würtz	SPD	46.0
1983	Walter Link	CDU	50.1
1987	Walter Link	CDU	44.3
1990	Walter Link	CDU	46.3
1994	Walter Link	CDU	44.3
1998	Detlev von Larcher	SPD	48.4
2002	Rolf Kramer	SPD	48.3
2005	Rolf Kramer	SPD	45.7
2009	Axel Knoerig	CDU	37.5
2013	Axel Knoerig	CDU	47.5
2017	Axel Knoerig	CDU	44.6
2021	Axel Knoerig	CDU	33.8
2025	Axel Knoerig	CDU	35.4

== Election results ==
=== 2025 election ===
Federal election (2025): Diepholz – Nienburg I
Notes:	Blue background denotes the winner of the electorate vote. Pink background denotes a candidate elected from their party list. Yellow background denotes an electorate win by a list member, or other incumbent. A ✓ or ✗ denotes status of any incumbent, win or lose respectively.						
Party	Candidate	Votes	%	±%	Party votes	%	±%
CDU	✓ Axel Knoerig	56,910	35.4	▲1.6	49,080	30.4	▲5.1
SPD	Peggy Schierenbeck	44,311	27.5	▼4.4	36,820	22.8	▼10.2
AfD	Andreas-Dieter Iloff	27.353	17.0	▲10.3	28,346	17.6	▲10.5
Greens	Thomas Heidemann	13,005	8.1	▼5.5	16,558	10.3	▼4.2
Left	Michael Barth	9,613	6.0	▲3.2	10,982	6.8	▲4.1
FDP	Heike Hanniker	5,318	3.3	▼6.1	7,376	4.6	▼7.5
BSW					5,920	3.7	
FW	Kareen Heineking	4,449	2.8		1,943	1.2	▲0.3
Tierschutzpartei					1,807	1.1	▼0.1
Volt					807	0.5	▲0.3
PARTEI					694	0.4	▼0.5
dieBasis					414	0.3	▼0.9
Pirates					234	0.1	▼0.2
BD					212	0.1	
Humanists					95	0.1	0.0
MLPD					29	0.0	0.0
Informal votes		1,113			755		
Total valid votes		160,959			161,317		
Turnout		162,072	83.5	▲7.9			
CDU hold	Majority	12,599	7.9	▲6.0			

=== 2021 election ===
Federal election (2021): Diepholz – Nienburg I
Notes:	Blue background denotes the winner of the electorate vote. Pink background denotes a candidate elected from their party list. Yellow background denotes an electorate win by a list member, or other incumbent. A ✓ or ✗ denotes status of any incumbent, win or lose respectively.						
Party	Candidate	Votes	%	±%	Party votes	%	±%
CDU	✓ Axel Knoerig	49,116	33.8	▼10.8	36,915	25.3	▼12.6
SPD	Peggy Schierenbeck	46,455	31.9	▲4.6	48,196	33.0	▲7.6
Greens	Sylvia Holste-Hagen	19,702	13.5	▲5.9	21,139	14.5	▲6.3
FDP	Jan Andreas Hinderks	13,671	9.4	▲2.4	17,628	12.1	▲1.5
AfD	Alfons Muhle	9,683	6.7	▼1.5	10,372	7.1	▼1.3
Left	Jürgen Abelmann	4,029	2.8	▼2.5	3,920	2.7	▼3.4
Tierschutzpartei					1,774	1.2	▲0.3
dieBasis	Detlev Pigors	2,111	1.5		1,722	1.2	
FW					1,322	0.9	▲0.5
PARTEI					1,294	0.9	▲0.1
Independent	Rüdiger Gums	727	0.5				
Pirates					465	0.3	0.0
Team Todenhöfer					395	0.3	
Volt					228	0.2	
NPD					123	0.1	▼0.2
Humanists					118	0.1	
ÖDP					113	0.1	▼0.1
V-Partei3					98	0.1	▼0.1
du.					78	0.1	
LKR					39	0.0	
MLPD					21	0.0	0.0
DKP					12	0.0	0.0
Informal votes		1,460			982		
Total valid votes		145,494			145,972		
Turnout		146,954	75.6	▼0.9			
CDU hold	Majority	2,661	1.9	▼15.4			

=== 2017 election ===
Federal election (2017): Diepholz – Nienburg I
Notes:	Blue background denotes the winner of the electorate vote. Pink background denotes a candidate elected from their party list. Yellow background denotes an electorate win by a list member, or other incumbent. A ✓ or ✗ denotes status of any incumbent, win or lose respectively.						
Party	Candidate	Votes	%	±%	Party votes	%	±%
CDU	✓ Axel Knoerig	65,465	44.6	▼2.9	55,833	37.9	▼5.6
SPD	Tevfik Özkan	40,102	27.3	▼6.1	37,505	25.5	▼6.0
AfD	Karl-Heinz Gerd Breternitz	11,955	8.1	▲5.6	12,434	8.4	▲5.0
Greens	Klaus-Joachim Schmelz	11,252	7.7	▲0.1	11,992	8.1	0.0
FDP	Alexander Carapinha-Hesse	10,285	7.0	▲5.0	15,515	10.5	▲5.6
Left	Jürgen Abelmann	7,759	5.3	▲1.8	8,951	6.1	▲1.6
Tierschutzpartei					1,353	0.9	▲0.1
PARTEI					1,104	0.7	
FW					668	0.5	
Pirates					476	0.3	▼1.2
NPD					366	0.2	▼0.6
BGE					258	0.2	
ÖDP					219	0.1	
DM					206	0.1	
V-Partei³					191	0.1	
DiB					162	0.1	
MLPD					28	0.0	0.0
DKP					17	0.0	
Informal votes		1,480			1,020		
Total valid votes		146,818			147,278		
Turnout		148,298	76.5	▲2.7			
CDU hold	Majority	25,363	17.3	▲3.2			

=== 2013 election ===
Federal election (2013): Diepholz – Nienburg I
Notes:	Blue background denotes the winner of the electorate vote. Pink background denotes a candidate elected from their party list. Yellow background denotes an electorate win by a list member, or other incumbent. A ✓ or ✗ denotes status of any incumbent, win or lose respectively.						
Party	Candidate	Votes	%	±%	Party votes	%	±%
CDU	✓ Axel Knoerig	66,862	47.5	▲9.9	61,404	43.5	▲9.7
SPD	Christoph Lanzendörfer	47,067	33.4	▼1.0	44,431	31.5	▲3.8
Greens	Torsten Eggelmann	10,651	7.6	▼0.9	11,556	8.2	▼1.8
Left	Ingo Waschner	4,933	3.5	▼3.5	6,359	4.5	▼3.8
AfD	Arno Heinz Staschewski	3,571	2.5		4,840	3.4	
FDP	Marcel Schiller	2,797	2.0	▼9.4	6,929	4.9	▼10.8
Pirates	Mario Gärtner	2,166	1.5		2,143	1.5	▼0.2
NPD	Bernd Neumann	1,288	0.9	▼0.3	1,175	0.8	▼0.2
Tierschutzpartei					1,196	0.8	▲0.1
FW	Olaf Schulz	903	0.6		673	0.5	
Independent	Rüdiger Gums	616	0.4				
PRO					169	0.1	
PBC					137	0.1	
REP					102	0.1	
MLPD					21	0.0	0.0
Informal votes		1,496			1,215		
Total valid votes		140,854			141,135		
Turnout		142,350	73.7	▲0.4			
CDU hold	Majority	19,795	14.1	▲11.1			

=== 2009 election ===
Federal election (2009): Diepholz – Nienburg I
Notes:	Blue background denotes the winner of the electorate vote. Pink background denotes a candidate elected from their party list. Yellow background denotes an electorate win by a list member, or other incumbent. A ✓ or ✗ denotes status of any incumbent, win or lose respectively.						
Party	Candidate	Votes	%	±%	Party votes	%	±%
CDU	Axel Knoerig	52,599	37.5	▼1.5	47,565	33.8	▲0.4
SPD	✗ Rolf Kramer	48,313	34.5	▼11.3	38,955	27.7	▼14.0
FDP	Horst Gaumann	15,928	11.4	▲6.4	22,067	15.7	▲5.0
Greens	Stefanie Henneke	11,917	8.5	▲3.0	13,999	10.0	▲2.6
Left	Ulrich Vanek	9,775	7.0	▲3.4	11,701	8.3	▲4.0
Pirates					2,453	1.7	
NPD	Dietrich Seidel	1,660	1.2	0.0	1,442	1.0	▼0.2
Tierschutzpartei					1,059	0.8	▲0.2
RRP					937	0.7	
DVU					193	0.1	
ÖDP					143	0.1	
MLPD					27	0.0	0.0
Informal votes		1,646			1,315		
Total valid votes		140,192			140,523		
Turnout		141,838	73.3	▼5.7			
CDU gain from SPD	Majority	4,286	3.1				

=== 2005 election ===
Federal election (2005):Diepholz – Nienburg I
Notes:	Blue background denotes the winner of the electorate vote. Pink background denotes a candidate elected from their party list. Yellow background denotes an electorate win by a list member, or other incumbent. A ✓ or ✗ denotes status of any incumbent, win or lose respectively.						
Party	Candidate	Votes	%	±%	Party votes	%	±%
SPD	✓ Rolf Kramer	68,750	45.7	▼2.6	62,773	41.7	▼6.1
CDU	Axel Knoerig	58,684	39.0	▲1.7	50,311	33.4	▲0.4
Greens	Torsten König	8,329	5.5	▼1.5	11,070	7.4	▲0.3
FDP	Marco Genthe	7,454	5.0	▼1.8	16,092	10.7	▲1.7
Left	Ulrich Vanek	5,418	3.6		6,577	4.4	▲3.4
NPD	Gustav-Arnold Eggerking	1,735	1.2		1,782	1.2	▲1.0
Tierschutzpartei					870	0.6	▲0.2
GRAUEN					545	0.4	▲0.2
PBC					315	0.2	▼0.1
Pro German Center – Pro D-Mark Initiative					112	0.1	
BüSo					75	0.0	0.0
MLPD					56	0.0	
Informal votes		1,664			1,456		
Total valid votes		150,370			150,578		
Turnout		152,034	79.0	▼1.5			
SPD hold	Majority	10,066	6.7				
