= Hübsche families =

Social class in 18–19th century Hanover

The hübsche families (German: Hübsche Familien, meaning 'families at court' at the time the term was in use) were the third elite class of the Electorate and Kingdom of Hanover in the 18th and early 19th centuries, after the nobility and the clergy. At the time the Kingdom of Hanover was in a personal union with the United Kingdom. The hübsche families consisted of the higher bourgeoisie and the elite of university-educated civil servants, and played a significant role in the governing of Hanover, often as higher civil servants.

The use of the word hübsch(e) in the sense of "courtly", "genteel", "presentable at court" is so archaic (etymologically related to höfisch, 'courtly') that it is not even mentioned in modern German dictionaries; nowadays it only means "pretty, handsome" (in addition to similar metaphorical meanings that these English equivalents also have), which is why most German speakers misunderstand hübsche Familien.

The hübsche families have been described as a "state patriciate" in post-Roman Europe.

In contrast to old noble families which tended to favour military careers, hübsche families placed emphasis on academic education, especially legal education, and favoured careers in the civil service. The hübsche families were a form of Bildungsbürgertum.

== Notable families ==
- Albrecht family
- Baring family

== Literature ==
- Joachim Lampe: Aristokratie, Hofadel und Staatspatriziat in Kurhannover. Die Lebenskreise der höheren Beamten an den kurhannoverschen Zentral- und Hofbehörden 1714–1760. In Veröffentlichungen der Historischen Kommission für Niedersachsen und Bremen, Folge 24: Untersuchungen zur Ständegeschichte Niedersachsens, vol. 2, Historische Kommission für Niedersachsen und Bremen, Göttingen: Vandenhoeck & Ruprecht, 1963.
- Henning Rischbieter (ed.): Hannoversches Lesebuch oder: was in Hannover und über Hannover geschrieben, gedruckt und gelesen wurde, vol 1: 1650–1850, 3rd edition, Hanover: Schlütersche Verlagsgesellschaft, ISBN 3-87706-039-0, p. 64f. and p. 145ff.
- H. Barmeyer: Hof und Hofgesellschaft in Hannover. In Hans-Dieter Schmid (ed.): Hannover – am Rande der Stadt, in the series Hannoversche Schriften zur Regional- und Lokalgeschichte, vol. 5, Bielefeld: Verlag für Regionalgeschichte, 1992, ISBN 3-927085-44-8, p. 67–89.
- Mlynek, Klaus (2009), "Hübsche Familien", in Klaus Mlynek; Waldemar R. Röhrbein (eds.), Hannover City Lexicon. From the beginnings into the present (in German), Hanover: Schlütersche Verlagsgesellschaft, p. 310, OCLC 458691668, OL 45212542M, Wikidata Q2327579
