= 1994 Lower Saxony state election =

State election in Lower Saxony, Germany

- 13 March 1994

All 161 seats in the Landtag of Lower Saxony 81 seats needed for a majority
- Turnout: 4,249,021 (73.8%) ▼0.8%
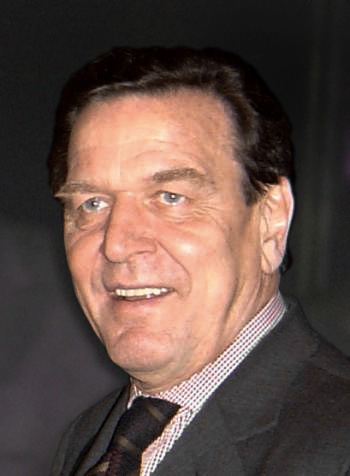

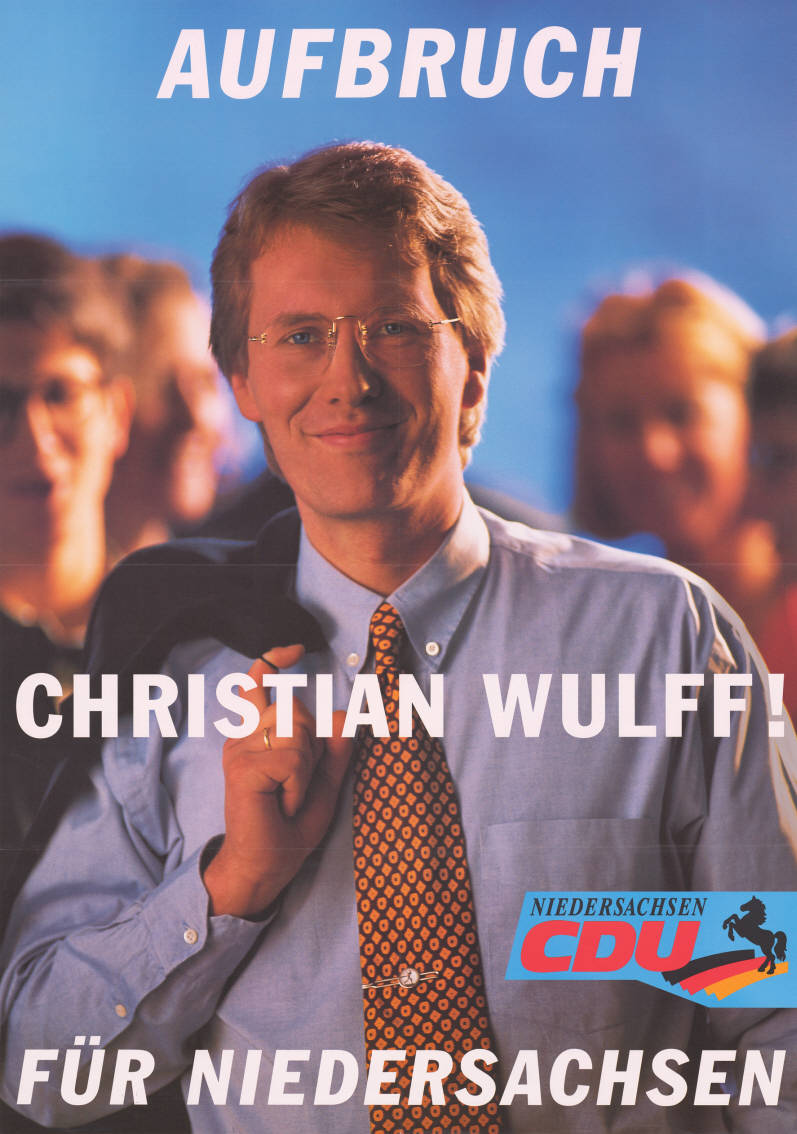
	First party	Second party
Leader	Gerhard Schröder	Christian Wulff
Party	SPD	CDU
Last election	71 seats, 44.2%	67 seats, 42.0%
Seats won	81	67
Seat change	▲10	0
Popular vote	1,880,623	1,547,610
Percentage	44.3%	36.4%
Swing	▲0.1%	▼5.6%
	Third party	Fourth party
Party	Greens	FDP
Last election	8 seats, 5.5%	9 seats, 6.0%
Seats won	13	0
Seat change	▲5	▼9
Popular vote	314,344	188,691
Percentage	7.4%	4.4%
Swing	▲1.9%	▼1.6%
- Results for the single-member constituencies
Minister-President before election
Gerhard Schröder
SPD
Elected Minister-President
Gerhard Schröder
SPD

The 1994 Lower Saxony state election was held on 13 March 1994 to elect the members of the 13th Landtag of Lower Saxony. The incumbent government was a coalition of the Social Democratic Party (SPD) and The Greens led by Minister-President Gerhard Schröder. As the SPD won an absolute majority of seats in the election, it formed government alone, and Schröder continued in office.

== Parties ==
The table below lists parties represented in the 12th Landtag of Lower Saxony.

Name		Ideology	Leader(s)	1990 result	
Name		Ideology	Leader(s)	Votes (%)	Seats
SPD	Social Democratic Party of Germany; Sozialdemokratische Partei Deutschlands	Social democracy	Gerhard Schröder	44.2%	71 / 155
CDU	Christian Democratic Union of Germany; Christlich Demokratische Union Deutschlands	Christian democracy	Christian Wulff	42.0%	67 / 155
FDP	Free Democratic Party; Freie Demokratische Partei	Classical liberalism		6.0%	9 / 155
Grüne	Alliance 90/The Greens; Bündnis 90/Die Grünen	Green politics		5.5%	8 / 155

== Election result ==
Summary of the 13 March 1994 election results for the Landtag of Lower Saxony
Party	Votes	%	+/-	Seats	+/-	Seats %
Social Democratic Party (SPD)	1,880,623	44.3	▲0.1	81	▲10	50.3
Christian Democratic Union (CDU)	1,547,510	36.2	▼5.6	67	±0	41.6
Alliance 90/The Greens (Grüne)	314,344	7.4	▲1.9	13	▲5	8.1
Free Democratic Party (FDP)	188,691	4.4	▼1.6	0	▼9	0
The Republicans (REP)	159,026	3.7	▲2.2	0	±0	0
Statt Party (STATT)	55,605	1.3	▲1.3	0	±0	0
Others	103,122	2.4		0	±0	0
Total	4,249,021	100.0		161	▲6	
Voter turnout		73.8	▼0.8			

Popular Vote
SPD	44.26%
CDU	36.42%
B'90/GRÜNE	7.40%
FDP	4.44%
REP	3.74%
Other	3.74%

Landtag seats
SPD	50.31%
CDU	41.61%
B'90/GRÜNE	8.07%

== Sources ==
- Landtagswahlen in Niedersachsen
