= State Council of Hanover =

Political body of Hanover

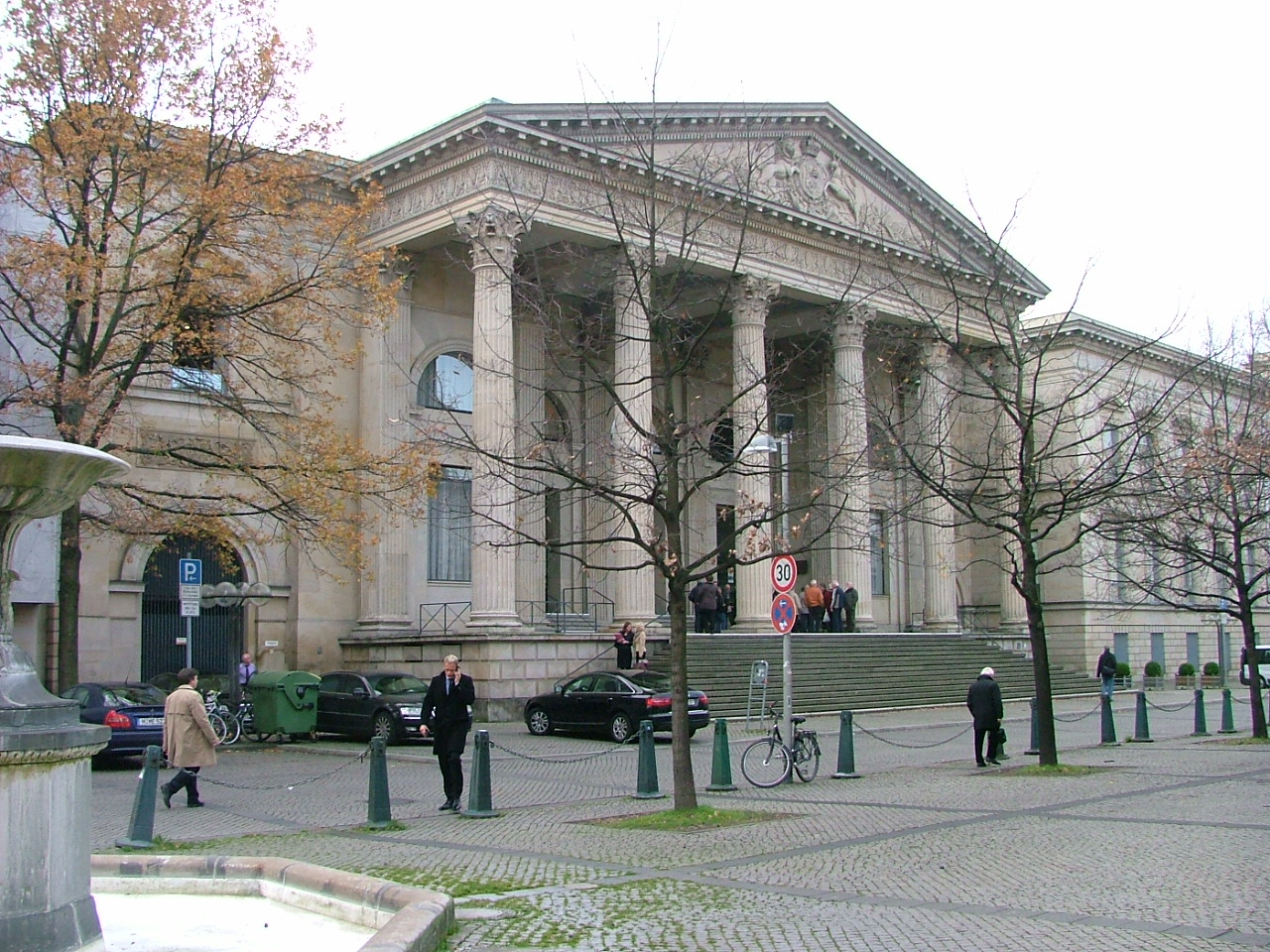
Leine Palace, seat of the State Council

The State Council of Hanover (German: Staatsrat) was a political body of the Kingdom of Hanover. It was the second chamber of the Parliament of Hanover. It was established in 1839 by King Ernest August I of Hanover and existed until the Prussian invasion and occupation of Hanover in 1866.

The first President of the State Council was Major-General Bernhard of Solms-Braunfels, a member of the princely Solms-Braunfels family, who held the office from 1839 to 1848. In 1848 he was succeeded by Prime Minister Alexander Levin von Bennigsen. From 1849 the Prime Minister was ex officio President of the State Council. From 1856 the constitution was changed again, and the President was henceforth appointed at the discretion of the King. Johann Caspar von der Wisch served as President of the council from 1856 to 1865. The last President was Wilhelm von Borries from 1865 to 1866.

In addition to its President the State Council consisted of the cabinet ministers and the highest-ranking civil servants as full members. In addition the King appointed other individuals as associate members.
