= Celle Hole =

German political scandal

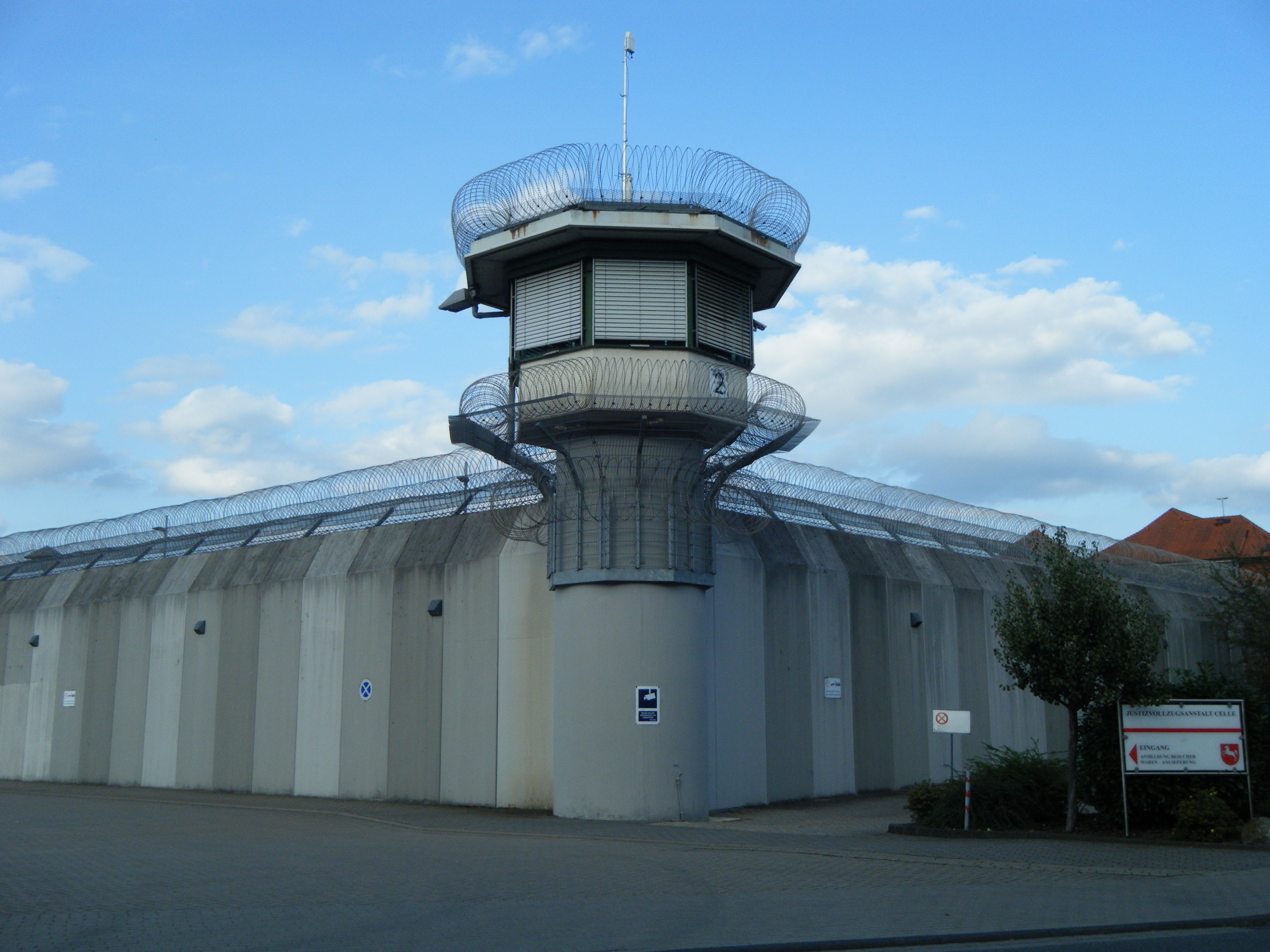
Watchtower of the JVA Celle

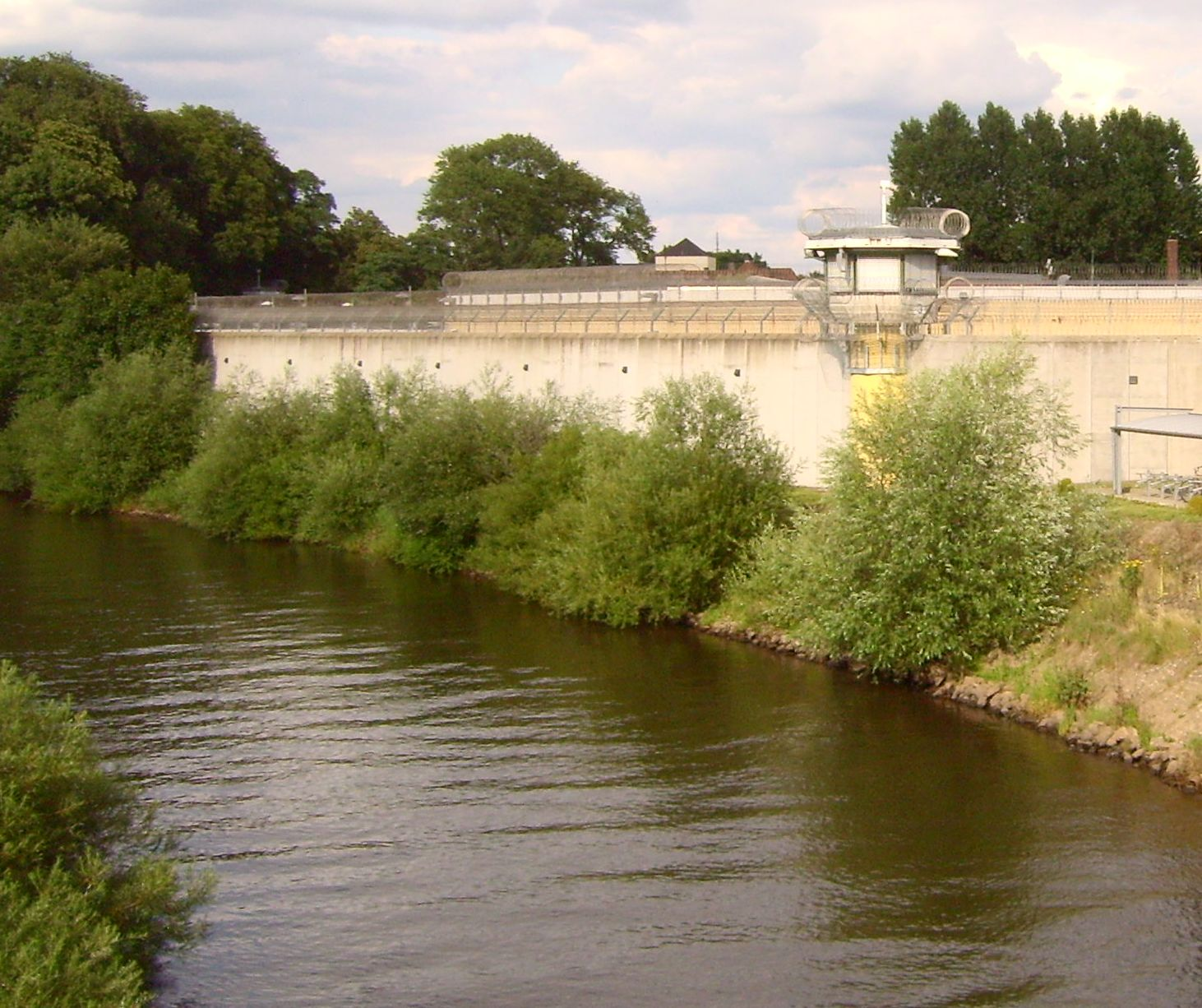
Prison wall behind the river Aller

Celle Hole (German: Celler Loch) was a breach in the outer wall of the prison of Celle, Germany. First used on July 25, 1978, the name was part of a campaign by one of the West German secret services (Landesbehörde für Verfassungsschutz) and the GSG 9 in an attempt to lay blame on the Red Army Faction, West Germany's most active and prominent left-wing terrorist group. However, the incident was revealed in 1986 to be a plot by the government, a false flag operation, much to the embarrassment of the government. The Verfassungsschutz used the name 'Operation Magic Fire' (German: Aktion Feuerzauber).

The secret services used a stolen Mercedes-Benz SL (R107), driven by two criminals named Klaus-Dieter Loudil and Manfred Berger who were recruited by the secret services. In the car were forged passports, one of them with a photograph of Sigurd Debus. Serial numbers of the passports showed that they were stolen from German authorities. Mr. Debus was an inmate in the Celle prison. He was considered a Red Army Faction terrorist suspect. Some tools to be used for a prison escape attempt were brought secretly to Debus' prison cell by the secret services.

The action should have taken place one night earlier when twelve secret service officers, one GSG 9 demolition squad officer and Jürgen Wiehe, a civil servant in the Ministry of the Interior of the state of Lower Saxony, waited for the right moment to detonate the bomb on July 24. But they had to interrupt the action since two lovers coming from the nearby funfair entered the danger area. So the action was deferred.

On July 25, 1978, at 2.54 a.m., the bomb was detonated at the outer prison wall, but caused minor damage. No inmate was able to escape. The Mercedes was later caught in Salzgitter (80 km away) in a police roadblock, with the driver having already escaped. The false passports and some ammunition were found in the car.

In Celle, a 1.5-square-meter hole, named the Celle Hole (Celler Loch), was left in the outer prison wall. A handgun, model Walther PPK 7.65, which was the official pistol of one of the secret service officers, as well as a rubber dinghy, were found. The Celle prison is situated close to the bank of the river Aller. After the detonation, Debus' conditions of detention were aggravated "for security reasons". The secret service had planted escape tools into Debus' cell, which were found in the search after the attack, and was supposed to prove Debus' participation. Hence, the detainee started a hunger strike as a protest against this. Sigurd Debus died of starvation on April 16, 1981, shortly before the scheduled date of his discharge from prison.
