= Ludwig Knoop =

German entrepreneur (1821–1894)

Johann Ludwig, Baron von Knoop
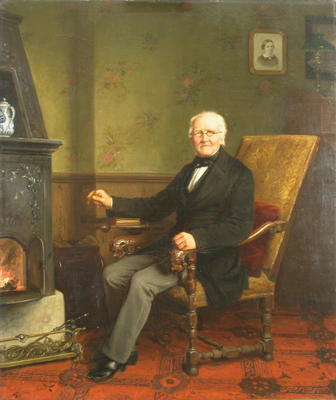
- Portrait of Baron von Knoop by Carl Johann Lasch (1878)
- Born: 15 May 1821; Bremen
- Died: 14 August 1894 (aged 73)
- Occupations: Cotton merchant and entrepreneur

Baron Johann Ludwig von Knoop (15 May 1821, in Bremen – 14 August 1894, in Bremen) was a German cotton merchant and entrepreneur from the city-state Free Hanseatic City of Bremen, who became one of the richest entrepreneurs in his time. He was created a Baron by Alexander II of Russia in 1877.

== Early life ==
He was born in Bremen, as the son of Gerhard Knoop (1782–1862) and Anna Rebecca Frerichs (1793–1878). He had three sisters and five brothers.

== Life ==
He studied in Bremen, and learned the cotton business in Manchester with the Bremen-born cotton exporter Johan Frerichs's company De Jersey & Co. He went to Moscow as assistant to the firm's agent Franz Holzhauer in 1840. That year he established the first power-driven cotton mill in Russia.

In 1842, the British ban on the export of cotton machinery, imposed in 1775 to protect the country's head start in technology, was lifted, allowing the manufacture of cotton to expand in Russia. Knoop used English credit to build and fit out mills with English equipment. The commissioning in 1847 of Savva Vasilyevich Morozov's Nikolskoye mill at Orekhovo-Zuyevo, Knoop's sixth, was seen as a landmark in the industry's development in Russia.

In 1852, he founded L Knoop & Co, in association with De Jersey and the machinery manufacturer Platt Brothers of Oldham, Lancashire. In 1857, he built the largest cotton spinning mill in Europe on the island of Kreenholm at Narva, Estonia, which employed 4,500 people. The Kreenholm Manufacturing Company's factory in Narva had nearly half a million spindles driven by waterpower. It paid low wages, but took its responsibilities to its workforce seriously, introducing a health insurance scheme and supplying workers with dwellings, kindergartens, and schools.

Eventually, Knoop was responsible for equipping 187 cotton mills on Russian territory. However, he came under attack from the Russian Technical Society for retarding industrial development in the country. This was because he relied exclusively on English machinery and also supplied the factories with English managers, technicians, and supervisors.

== Personal life ==
Coat of Arms of the Knoop family

He was married to Luise Mathilde Hoyer (1824-1894). They had 3 sons and 3 daughters:

- Louise Dorothea Betty von Knoop (1844-1899), settled in Bremen where she married George Alexander Albrecht
  - Carl Albrecht (1875–1952), their son was a major cotton merchant in Bremen. Their descendants include Ernst Albrecht, Hans-Holger Albrecht and Ursula von der Leyen.
- Baron Johann Knoop (1846-1918), managed the London office of the building and became a noted collector of violins.
- Theodor Julius von Knoop, (1848-1931), managed various enterprises in Imperial Russia, died in Berlin
- Adele Mathilde von Knoop, (1853-1932), married Johann Georg Wolde of Bremen, art collector
- Johann-Andreas von Knoop, (1855-1927), left Moscow after the October Revolution and died in England
- Emilie Anna von Knoop (1858-1920), married Heinrich Wilhelm Kulenkampff of Bremen

== Death ==
He died on 16 August 1894 at St Magnus, Bremen, German empire, where a city park created from his estate is named after him.
