= List of members of the Lower Saxon Landtag 2003–2008 =

This is a list of the members of the Lower Saxon Landtag in the period 2003 to 2008. This is the fifteenth period. The members were elected in the election of 2 February 2003.

== Overview ==
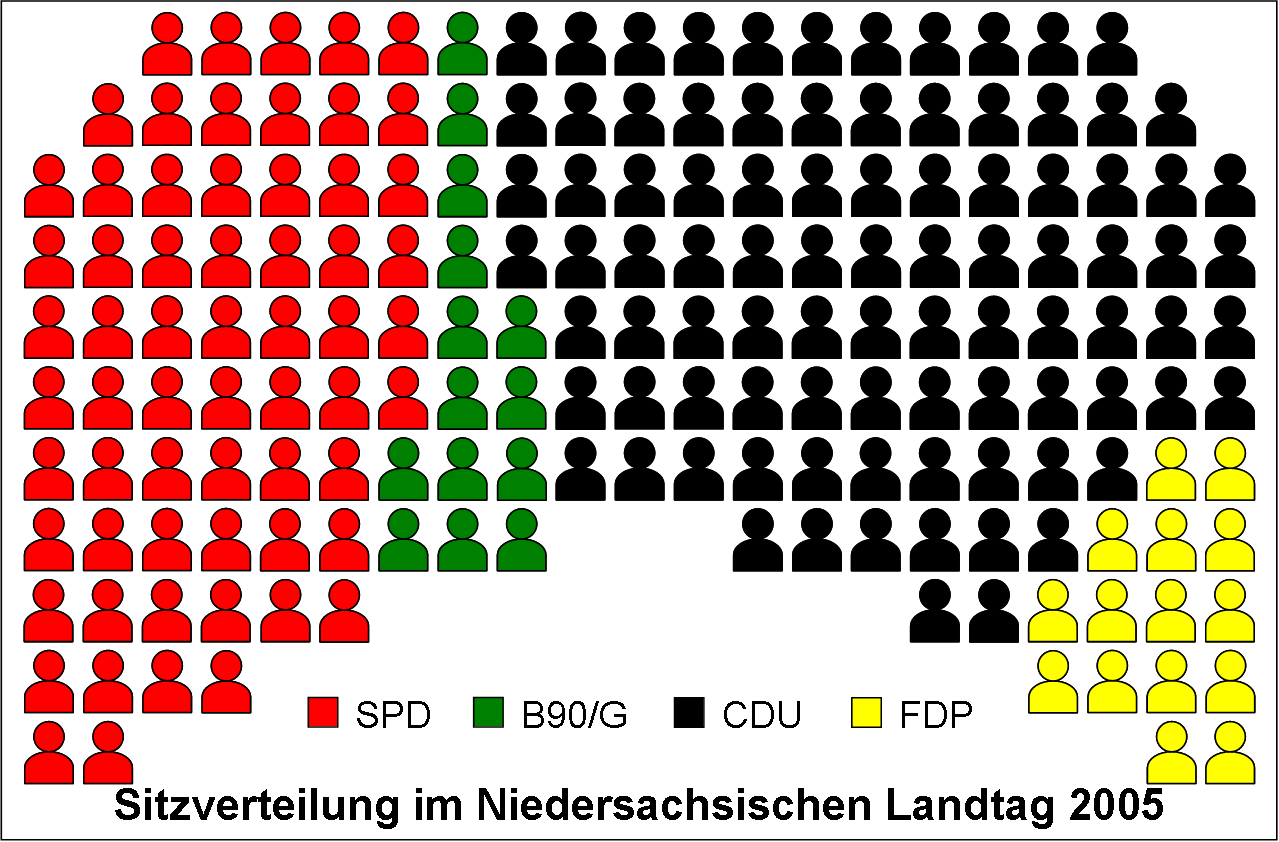

A total of 183 representatives were elected, distributed as follows:

- 63 to the Social Democratic Party (Sozialdemokratische Partei Deutschlands)
- 14 to the Alliance '90/The Greens (Bündnis 90/Die Grünen)
- 91 to the Christian Democratic Union (Christlich Demokratische Union Deutschlands)
- 15 to the Free Democratic Party (Freie Demokratische Partei)

Out of these representatives, the first cabinet Wulff was formed.

== List of representatives ==
Name	Party	Comments
Johann-Heinrich Ahlers	Christian Democratic	
Michael Albers	Social Democratic	
Joachim Albrecht	Christian Democratic	
Heinrich Aller	Social Democratic	
Gabriele Andretta	Social Democratic	
Bernd Althusmann	Christian Democratic	Party Whip (German: Parlamentarischer Geschäftsführer)
Klaus-Peter Bachmann	Social Democratic	
Uwe Bartels	Christian Democratic	Left on 23 February 2005. Was replaced by Klaus Schneck.
Heiner Bartling	Social Democratic	
Martin Bäumer	Christian Democratic	
Rainer Beckmann	Christian Democratic	
Karsten Behr	Christian Democratic	
Karin Bertholdes-Sandrock	Christian Democratic	
Hans-Christian Biallas	Christian Democratic	
Ulrich Biel	Social Democratic	
Uwe Biester	Christian Democratic	
Friedhelm Biestmann	Christian Democratic	
Karl-Heinz Bley	Christian Democratic	
Heike Bockmann	Social Democratic	
Jörg Bode	Free Democratic	
Norbert Böhlke	Christian Democratic	
Hennig Brandes	Christian Democratic	
Ralf Briese	Greens	
Volker Brockmann	Social Democratic	
Emil Brockstedt	Christian Democratic	
Christina Bührmann	Social Democratic	
Bernd Busemann	Christian Democratic	Member of the cabinet Wulff
Werner Buß	Social Democratic	
Reinhold Coenen	Christian Democratic	
Helmut Dammann-Tamke	Christian Democratic	
Karl-Ludwig von Danwitz	Christian Democratic	
Klaus-Peter Dehde	Social Democratic	
Hermann Dinkla	Christian Democratic	
Christian Dürr	Free Democratic	
Ingrid Eckel	Social Democratic	
Hans-Heinrich Ehlen	Christian Democratic	Member of the cabinet Wulff
Petra Emmerich-Kopatsch	Social Democratic	
Hermann Eppers	Christian Democratic	
Ursula Ernst	Christian Democratic	
Klaus Fleer	Social Democratic	
Sigmar Gabriel	Christian Democratic	Left on 9 November 2005. Was replaced by Christa Elsner-Solar.
Jürgen Gansäuer	Christian Democratic	President of the Parliament (German: Landtagspräsident)
Renate Geuter	Social Democratic	
Rudolf Götz	Christian Democratic	
Alice Graschtat	Social Democratic	
Ulla Groskurt	Social Democratic	
Hans-Dieter Haase	Social Democratic	
Enno Hagenah	Greens	
Ilse Hansen	Christian Democratic	
Uwe Harden	Social Democratic	
Rebecca Harms	Greens	Left on 15 September 2004. Was replaced by Filiz Polat.
Wilhelm Heidemann	Christian Democratic	
Frauke Heiligenstadt	Social Democratic	
Karsten Heineking	Christian Democratic	
Gabriele Heinen-Kljajic	Greens	
Friedhelm Helberg	Social Democratic	
Ursula Helmhold	Greens	
Marie-Luise Hemme	Social Democratic	
Wolfgang Hermann	Free Democratic	
Bernd-Carsten Hiebing	Christian Democratic	
Reinhold Hilbers	Christian Democratic	
Jörg Hillmer	Christian Democratic	
Walter Hirche	Free Democratic	Member of the cabinet Wulff
Wilhelm Hogrefe	Christian Democratic	
Ernst-August Hoppenbrock	Christian Democratic	
Frank Henry Horn	Social Democratic	
Carsten Höttcher	Christian Democratic	
Angelika Jahns	Christian Democratic	
Gabriele Jakob	Christian Democratic	
Hans-Joachim Janßen	Greens	
Meta Janssen-Kucz	Greens	
Claus Johannßen	Social Democratic	
Wolfgang Jüttner	Social Democratic	
Jens Kaidas	Christian Democratic	
Friedrich Kethorn	Christian Democratic	Left on 26 January 2005. Was replaced by Fritz Güntzler.
Karl-Heinz Klare	Christian Democratic	
Hans-Jürgen Klein	Greens	
Ingrid Klopp	Christian Democratic	
Lothar Koch	Christian Democratic	
Gabriela Kohlenberg	Christian Democratic	
Gisela Konrath	Christian Democratic	
Ina Korter	Greens	
Ursula Körtner	Christian Democratic	
Gerda Krämer	Social Democratic	
Klaus Krumfuß	Christian Democratic	
Ulrike Kuhlo	Free Democratic	
Georgia Langhans	Greens	
Karl-Heinrich Langspecht	Christian Democratic	
Carsten Lehmann	Free Democratic	Left on 9 November 2005. Was replaced by Gabriela König.
Hans-Albert Lennartz	Greens	
Günter Lenz	Social Democratic	Left on 15 June 2007. Was replaced by Jürgen Lanclée.
Uwe-Peter Lestin	Social Democratic	
Sigrid Leuschner	Social Democratic	
Ursula von der Leyen	Christian Democratic	Left on 7 December 2005. Was replaced by Dorothee Prüssner.
Editha Lorberg	Christian Democratic	
Clemens große Macke	Christian Democratic	
Max Matthiesen	Christian Democratic	
David McAllister	Christian Democratic	
Andreas Meihsies	Greens	
Walter Meinhold	Social Democratic	
Gesine Meißner	Free Democratic	
Heidrun Merk	Social Democratic	Left on 24 January 2007. Was replaced by Krause-Behrens.
Rolf Meyer	Social Democratic	
Axel Miesner	Christian Democratic	
Johanne Modder	Social Democratic	
Dieter Möhrmann	Social Democratic	
Hartmut Möllring	Christian Democratic	Member of the cabinet Wulff
Elke Müller	Social Democratic	
Heidemarie Mundlos	Christian Democratic	
Jens Nacke	Christian Democratic	
Matthias Nerlich	Christian Democratic	
Harald Noack	Christian Democratic	
Manfred Nahrstedt	Social Democratic	Left on 8 November 2006. Was replaced by Swantje Hartmann.
Frank Oesterhelweg	Christian Democratic	
Jan-Christoph Oetjen	Free Democratic	
Wolfgang Ontijd	Christian Democratic	
Thomas Oppermann	Christian Democratic	Left on 9 November 2005. Was replaced by Hans-Christian Schack.
Inse-Marie Ortgies	Christian Democratic	
Ursula Peters	Free Democratic	
Daniela Pfeiffer	Christian Democratic	
Christina Philipps	Christian Democratic	
Hans-Werner Pickel	Social Democratic	
Axel Plaue	Social Democratic	
Claus Peter Poppe	Social Democratic	
Friedrich Pörtner	Christian Democratic	
Sigrid Rakow	Social Democratic	
Klaus Rickert	Free Democratic	
Roland Riese	Free Democratic	
Friedrich-Otto Ripke	Christian Democratic	Left on 7 December 2005. Was replaced by Reinhard Hegewald.
Heinz Rolfes	Christian Democratic	
Philipp Rösler	Free Democratic	
Mechthild Ross-Luttmann	Christian Democratic	Member of the cabinet Wulff
Wolfgang Röttger	Christian Democratic	
Jutta Rübke	Social Democratic	
Brunhilde Rühl	Christian Democratic	
Joachim Runkel	Christian Democratic	
Isolde Saalmann	Social Democratic	
Hans-Heinrich Sander	Free Democratic	
Günter Schlüterbusch	Social Democratic	Died on 8 January 2004. Was replaced by Susanne Grote.
Wittich Schobert	Christian Democratic	
Heiner Schönecke	Christian Democratic	
Kurt Schrader	Christian Democratic	
Ulrike Schröder	Christian Democratic	
Uwe Schünemann	Christian Democratic	Member of the cabinet Wulff
Bernadette Schuster-Barkau	Social Democratic	
Annette Schwarz	Christian Democratic	
Hans-Werner Schwarz	Free Democratic	
Uwe Schwarz	Social Democratic	
Silva Seeler	Social Democratic	
Regina Seeringer	Christian Democratic	
Britta Siebert	Christian Democratic	
Brigitte Somfleth	Social Democratic	
Dieter Steinecke	Social Democratic	Left on 7 June 2007. Was replaced by Oliver Lowin.
Dorothea Steiner	Greens	
Karin Stief-Kreihe	Social Democratic	
Lutz Stratmann	Christian Democratic	Member of the cabinet Wulff
Otto Stumpf	Christian Democratic	
Joachim Stünkel	Christian Democratic	
Ulf Thiele	Christian Democratic	
Hans Peter Thul	Christian Democratic	Left on 6 December 2006. Was replaced by Ullrich Kemmer.
Björn Thümler	Christian Democratic	
Thorsten Thümler	Christian Democratic	Left on 22 June 2005. Was replaced by Hans Bookmeyer.
Rosemarie Tinius	Social Democratic	
Gitta Trauernicht-Jordan	Social Democratic	Left on 23 June 2004. Was replaced by Rudolf Robbert.
Katrin Trost	Christian Democratic	
Ingolf Viereck	Social Democratic	
Astrid Vockert	Christian Democratic	
Irmgard Vogelsang	Christian Democratic	
Jacques Voigtländer	Social Democratic	
Dörthe Weddige-Degenhard	Social Democratic	
Hans-Hermann Wendhausen	Social Democratic	
Stefan Wenzel	Greens	
Silke Weyberg	Christian Democratic	
Amei Wiegel	Social Democratic	
André Wiese	Christian Democratic	
Gerd Ludwig Will	Social Democratic	
Kuno Winn	Christian Democratic	
Erhard Wolfkühler	Social Democratic	
Monika Wörmer-Zimmermann	Social Democratic	
Wolfgang Wulf	Social Democratic	
Christian Wulff	Christian Democratic	Minister-President (German: Ministerpräsident)
Anneliese Zachow	Christian Democratic	
Roland Zielke	Free Democratic	
