= Cabinet Gabriel =

State government of Lower Saxony, Germany (1999–2003)

Cabinet of Sigmar Gabriel Cabinet Gabriel
- 23rd Cabinet of Lower Saxony
- 15 December 1999 – 4 March 2003
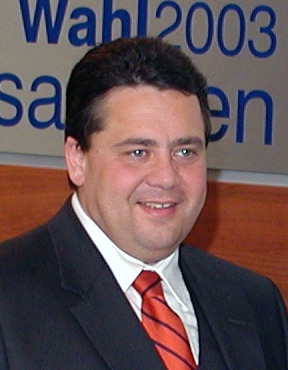
- Sigmar Gabriel
- Date formed: 15 December 1999
- Date dissolved: 4 March 2003 (3 years, 2 months, 2 weeks and 3 days)

People and organisations
- Chancellor: Gerhard Schröder
- Minister President: Sigmar Gabriel
- Member party: Social Democratic Party
- Status in legislature: Majority
- Opposition party: Christian Democratic Union; Alliance 90/The Greens
- Opposition leader: Christian Democratic Union

History
- Election: 1998 Lower Saxony state election
- Legislature term: 14th Landtag of Lower Saxony
- Predecessor: Cabinet Glogowski
- Successor: Cabinet Wulff I

The Cabinet Gabriel was the state government of the German state of Lower Saxony from 15 December 1999 until 4 March 2003. The Cabinet was headed by Minister President Sigmar Gabriel and was formed by the Social Democratic Party. On 15 December 1999 Gabriel was elected and sworn in as Minister President by the Landtag of Lower Saxony. A cabinet reshuffle took place in December 2000.

== Composition ==
Portfolio	Minister	Took office	Left office	Party
Minister President	Sigmar Gabriel	15 December 1999	4 March 2003	SPD
Deputy Minister President	Heidrun Merk	15 December 1999	12 December 2000	SPD
Deputy Minister President	Renate Jürgens-Pieper	13 December 2000	4 March 2003	SPD
Minister of the Interior	Heiner Bartling	15 December 1999	4 March 2003	SPD
Minister of Economics, Technology and Transport	Peter Fischer	15 December 1999	12 December 2000	SPD
Minister of Economics, Technology and Transport	Peter Fischer	13 December 2000	4 March 2003	SPD
Minister of Nutrition, Agriculture and Forestry	Uwe Bartels	15 December 1999	4 March 2003	SPD
Minister of Finance	Heinrich Aller	15 December 1999	4 March 2003	SPD
Minister of Justice	Wolf Weber	15 December 1999	12 December 2000	SPD
Minister of Justice	Christian Pfeiffer	13 December 2000	4 March 2003	SPD
Minister of Education	Renate Jürgens-Pieper	15 December 1999	4 March 2003	SPD
Minister of Social Affairs, Women, Families and Health	Heidrun Merk	15 December 1999	12 December 2000	SPD
Minister of Social Affairs, Women, Families and Health	Gitta Trauernicht	13 December 1999	4 March 2003	SPD
Minister of Science and Culture	Thomas Oppermann	15 December 1999	4 March 2003	SPD
Minister of the Environment	Wolfgang Jüttner	15 December 1999	4 March 2003	SPD
Minister of Federal and European Affairs	Wolfgang Senff	15 December 1999	4 March 2003	SPD
