= Cabinet Glogowski =

State government of Lower Saxony, Germany (1998–99)

Cabinet of Gerhard Glogowski Cabinet Glogowski
- 22nd Cabinet of Lower Saxony
- 28 October 1998 – 14 December 1999
- Date formed: 28 October 1998
- Date dissolved: 14 December 1999 (1 year, 1 month, 2 weeks and 2 days)

People and organisations
- Chancellor: Gerhard Schröder
- Minister President: Gerhard Glogowski
- Deputy Minister President: Heidrun Merk
- Member party: Social Democratic Party
- Status in legislature: Majority
- Opposition party: Christian Democratic Union; Alliance 90/The Greens
- Opposition leader: Christian Democratic Union

History
- Election: 1998 Lower Saxony state election
- Legislature term: 14th Landtag of Lower Saxony
- Predecessor: Cabinet Schröder III
- Successor: Cabinet Gabriel

The Cabinet Glogowski was the state government of the German state of Lower Saxony from 28 October 1998 until 14 December 1999. The Cabinet was headed by Minister President Gerhard Glogowski and was formed by the Social Democratic Party.

On 28 October 1998, Minister President Gerhard Schröder resigned from his position as Minister President due to his new position as Chancellor. On the same day, Gerhard Glogowski was elected as his successor by the Landtag of Lower Saxony. Cabinet Glogowski was succeeded by Siegmar Gabriel's Cabinet Gabriel.

== Composition ==
Portfolio	Minister	Took office	Left office	Party
Minister President	Gerhard Glogowski	28 October 1998	14 December 1999	SPD
Deputy Minister President & Minister of Women, Labour and Social Affairs	Heidrun Merk	28 October 1998	14 December 1999	SPD
Minister of the Interior	Heiner Bartling	28 October 1998	14 December 1999	SPD
Minister of Economics, Technology and Transport	Peter Fischer	28 October 1998	14 December 1999	SPD
Minister of Nutrition, Agriculture and Forestry	Uwe Bartels	28 October 1998	14 December 1999	SPD
Minister of Finance	Heinrich Aller	28 October 1998	14 December 1999	SPD
Minister of Justice and European Affairs	Wolf Weber	28 October 1998	14 December 1999	SPD
Minister of Education	Renate Jürgens-Pieper	28 October 1998	14 December 1999	SPD
Minister of Science and Culture	Thomas Oppermann	28 October 1998	14 December 1999	SPD
Minister of the Environment	Wolfgang Jüttner	28 October 1998	14 December 1999	SPD
