= Cabinet Schröder III (Lower Saxony) =

State government of Lower Saxony (March–October 1998)

Third Cabinet of Gerhard Schröder Cabinet Schröder III
- 21st Cabinet of Lower Saxony
- 30 March 1998 – 27 October 1998
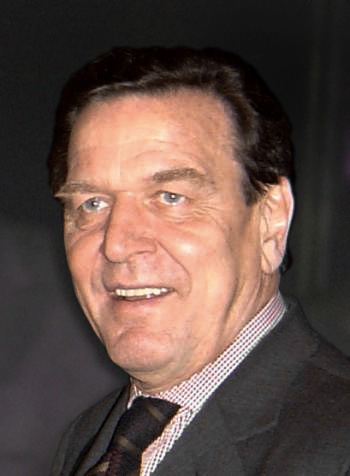
- Gerhard Schröder
- Date formed: 30 March 1998
- Date dissolved: 27 October 1998 (6 months, 3 weeks and 6 days)

People and organisations
- Chancellor: Helmut Kohl
- Minister President: Gerhard Schröder
- Deputy Minister President: Gerhard Glogowski
- Member party: Social Democratic Party
- Status in legislature: Majority
- Opposition party: Christian Democratic Union; Alliance 90/The Greens
- Opposition leader: Christian Democratic Union

History
- Election: 1998 Lower Saxony state election
- Legislature term: 14th Landtag of Lower Saxony
- Predecessor: Cabinet Schröder II
- Successor: Cabinet Glogowski

The Cabinet Schröder III was the state government of the German state of Lower Saxony from 30 March 1998 until 27 October 1998. The Cabinet was headed by Minister President Gerhard Schröder and was formed by the Social Democratic Party, after Schröder's winning of the 1998 Lower Saxony state election. On 30 March 1998 Schröder was re-elected and sworn in as Minister President by the Landtag of Lower Saxony.

On 27 October 1998, Gerhard Schröder resigned as Minister President hours before taking office as Chancellor of Germany in October 1998, after his successful win in 1998 German federal election. One member of this cabinet - Funke - was also part of Schröder's first cabinet as Chancellor.

His cabinet was succeeded by his former deputy Gerhard Glogowski, forming the Cabinet Glogowski.

== Composition ==
Portfolio	Minister	Took office	Left office	Party
Minister President	Gerhard Schröder	30 March 1998	27 October 1998	SPD
Deputy Minister President & Minister of the Interior	Gerhard Glogowski	30 March 1998	27 October 1998	SPD
Minister of Economics, Technology and Transport	Peter Fischer	30 March 1998	27 October 1998	SPD
Minister of Nutrition, Agriculture and Forestry	Karl-Heinz Funke	30 March 1998	27 October 1998	SPD
Minister of Finance	Heinrich Aller	30 March 1998	27 October 1998	SPD
Minister of Justice and European Affairs	Wolf Weber	30 March 1998	27 October 1998	SPD
Minister of Education	Renate Jürgens-Pieper	30 March 1998	27 October 1998	SPD
Minister of Science and Culture	Thomas Oppermann	30 March 1998	27 October 1998	SPD
Minister of the Environment	Wolfgang Jüttner	30 March 1998	27 October 1998	SPD
Minister of Women, Labour and Social Affairs	Heidrun Merk	30 March 1998	27 October 1998	SPD
