= Briese (surname) =

Briese is a surname. Notable people with the surname include:

- Gaston Briese (1898–1953), German stage and film actor
- Gerd Briese (1897–1957), German film actor
- Naemi Briese (1908–1980), Swedish film actress
- Ralf Briese (1971–2011), German politician for the Alliance '90/The Greens
- Stu Briese (born 1945 or 1946), politician in Manitoba, Canada
