= Horst Milde =

German politician (1933–2023)

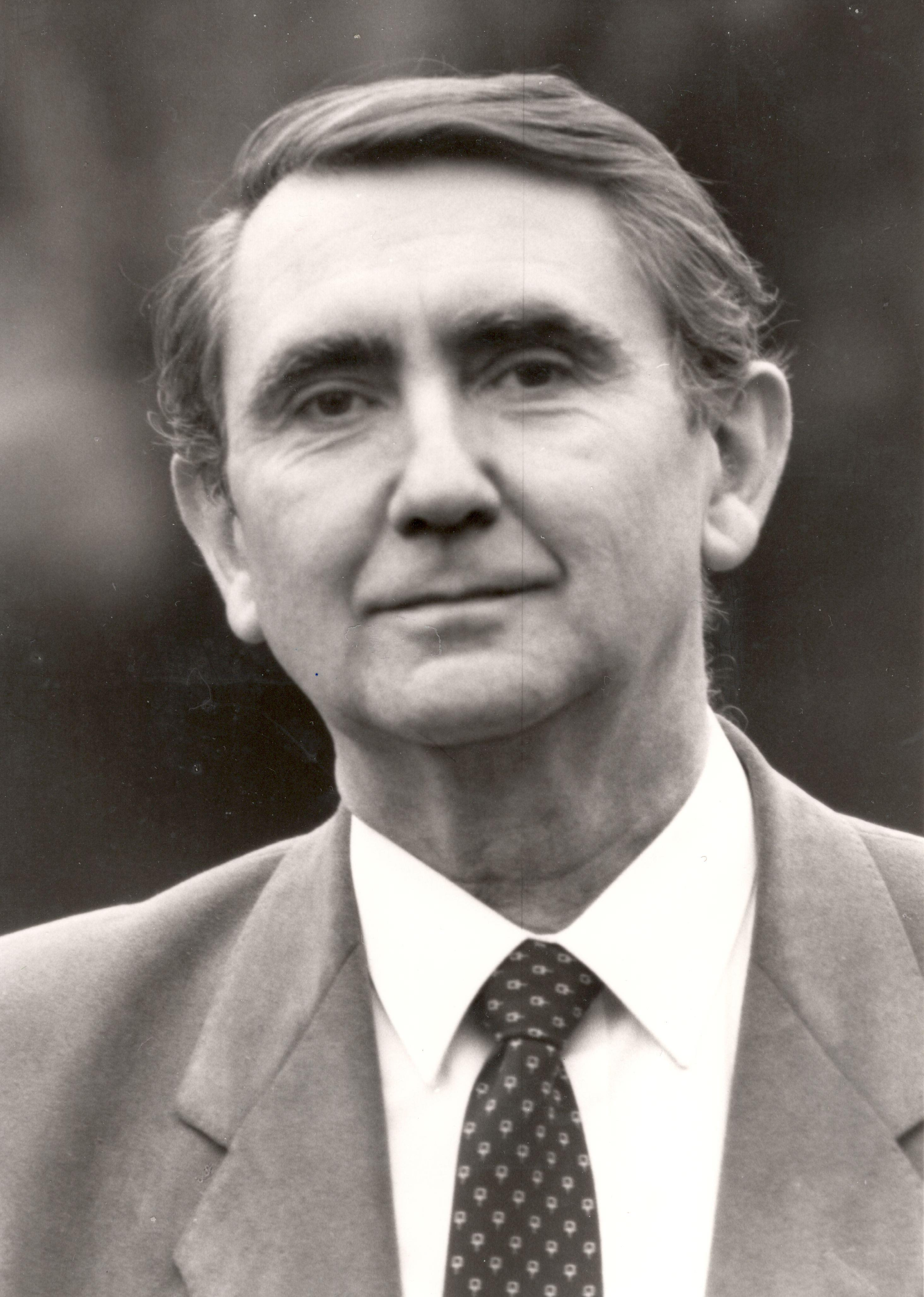
- Milde in 2000

President of the Landtag of Lower Saxony
- In office 1990–1998
- Preceded by: Edzard Blanke
- Succeeded by: Rolf Wernstedt

Personal details
- Born: 6 April 1933 Breslau, Lower Silesia, Prussia, Germany
- Died: 29 March 2023 (aged 89)
- Party: SPD
- Education: Ubbo-Emmius-Gymnasium
- Occupation: Politician

Horst Milde (6 April 1933 – 29 March 2023) was a German politician. A member of the Social Democratic Party, he served as president of the Landtag of Lower Saxony from 1990 to 1998.

== Life and career ==
Milde attended the Elisabet-Gymnasium in Breslau from 1943 to 1945. After World War II, his family was expelled, and settled in Leer, Lower Saxony. He completed school there to 1951 at the Ubbo-Emmius-Gymnasium, and then worked for the City of Leer.

He joined the Social Democratic Party of Germany (SPD) in 1956. He was a member of the district parliament (Kreistag) from 1964 to 1973, deputy Landrat of the district from 1965 to 1968, and mayor of Leer from 1968 to 1973. He was a member of the Landtag of Lower Saxony first from 1967 to 1974, and again from . He served as its president from 1990 to 1998. He worked towards a merge of the northern States in Germany, and supported an exchange to his hometown Breslau and reconciliation with Poland.

Milde was from 1986 to 1991 mayor of Oldenburg. He was influential in the founding of its university. He was patron of the Ronald McDonald House Charities, running the Ronald McDonald House for children with severe illness and their families, from 2003.

Milde died on 29 March 2023, at age 89.

== Awards ==
- 1973: Order of Merit of the Federal Republic of Germany
- 1996: Ehrenbürger of the Carl von Ossietzky Universität Oldenburg
- 1999: Order of Merit of the Republic of Poland
- 2000: Medal "1000 years Breslau" (1000 lat Wrocławia)
- 2005: Honorary Senator of the Fachhochschule Oldenburg/Ostfriesland/Wilhelmshaven
- 2013: Verdienter Bürger Breslaus (merited citizen of Breslau, Merito de Wratislawia)
- 2018: Silver Medal of Breslau
