= Cabinet Wulff =

Cabinet Wulff may refer to two cabinets in German state politics:

- first cabinet Wulff, Lower Saxony
- second cabinet Wulff, Lower Saxony
