= Hanna Naber =

German politician (born 1971)

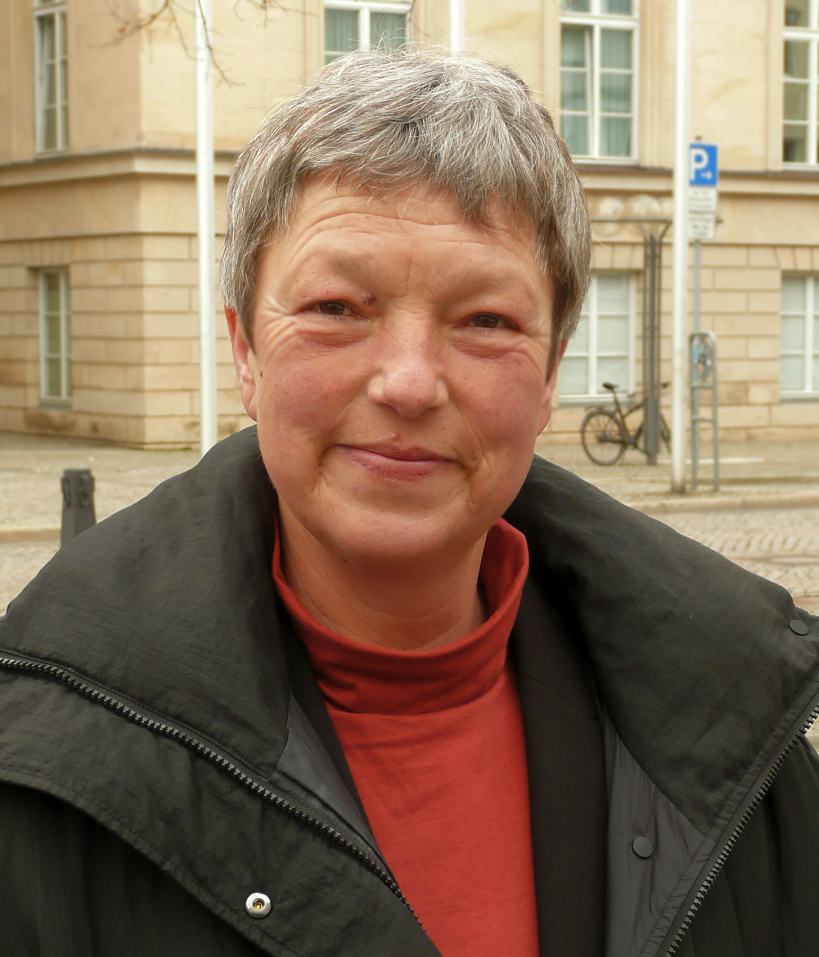
- Naber in 2024

President of the Landtag of Lower Saxony
- Incumbent
- Assumed office 8 November 2022
- Preceded by: Gabriele Andretta

Personal details
- Born: 21 May 1971 (age 54) Neuenhaus
- Party: Social Democratic Party (since 1988)

Hanna Judith Naber (born 21 May 1971 in Neuenhaus) is a German politician serving as a member of the Landtag of Lower Saxony since 2017. She has served as president of the Landtag since 2022.
