= Jörg Hillmer =

German politician (born 1966)

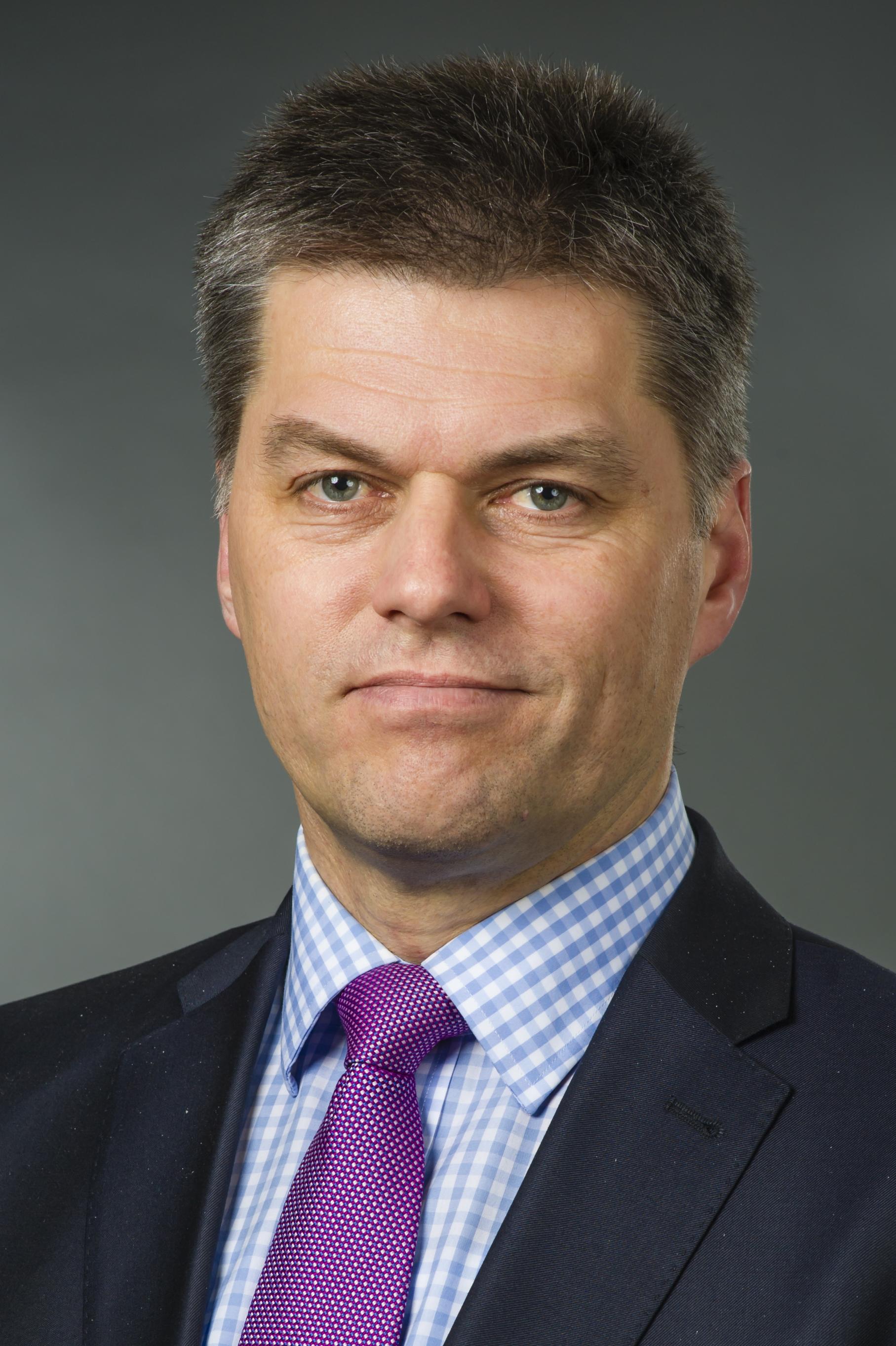
- Hillmer in 2018

Member of the Landtag of Lower Saxony
- Incumbent
- Assumed office 4 March 2003
- Preceded by: Jacques Voigtländer
- Constituency: Uelzen

Personal details
- Born: 21 May 1966 (age 59) Bad Bevensen
- Party: Christian Democratic Union (since 1992)

Jörg Hillmer (born 21 May 1966 in Bad Bevensen) is a German politician serving as a member of the Landtag of Lower Saxony since 2003. He has served as deputy Landrat of Uelzen since 2016.
