= Johanne Modder =

German politician (born 1960)

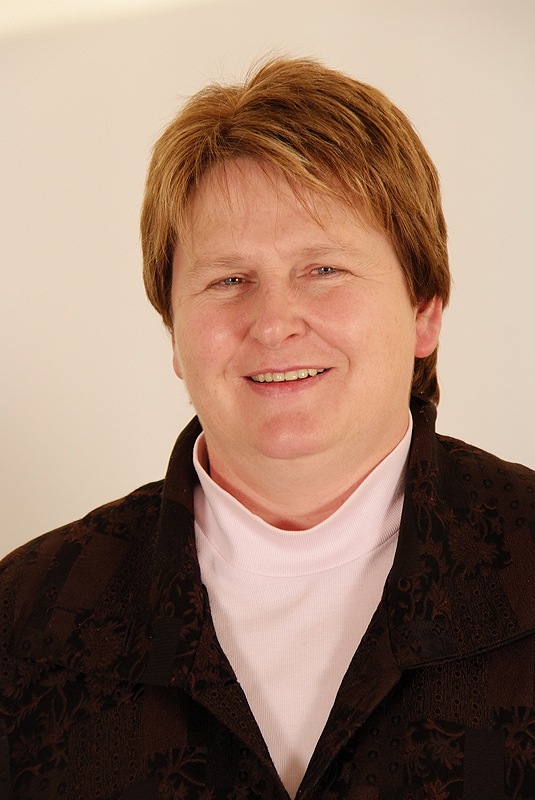
Portrait of Johanne Modder

Johanne Modder (born 12 July 1960) is a German politician for the SPD and since 2013 parliamentary leader 'Fraktionsvorsitzende' for its party in the Landtag of Lower Saxony; federal state diet of Lower Saxony.

== Life and politics ==
Modder was born 1960 in the Frisian village of Bunde and became member of the left-wing SPD in 1986.

Modder became member of the lower-Saxonian parliament in Hanover in 2003. Since 2013 it is Fraktionsvorsitzende (parliamentary leader) of the SPD in Lower-Saxony.
