= Claus Peter Poppe =

German politician (born 1948)

Claus Peter Poppe MdL
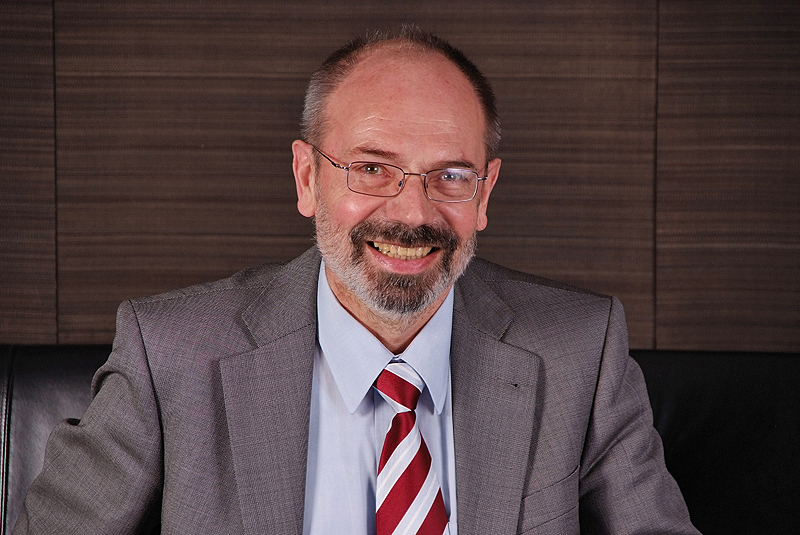

Councilor of Lohne
- In office 1976–1996

Member of the Lower Saxony Landtag
- In office 2003–2014

Personal details
- Born: 1 March 1948 (age 78) Lohne, Germany
- Party: Social Democratic Party of Germany
- Website: claus-peter-poppe.de

Claus Peter Poppe (born 1 March 1948) is a German politician, representative of the Social Democratic Party.

== Politics ==
Since 1975, Poppe has been a member of the SPD. From 1976 to 1996 he was a councillor of the city of Lohne, most recently as chairman of the SPD parliamentary group in the city. From 1986 to 1996 he was elected to represent Vechta District.

Poppe was elected to the Lower Saxony Landtag in 2003 (the 15th Legislature of Lower Saxony). He was re-elected into MdL office in 2008 and 2013. Since 2008 Poppe has also been a member of the Working Group "Integration" of the SPD-Land Group, member of the "Gesprächskreis SPD and Churches" and the Rolf-Dieter-Brinkmann-Gesellschaft. He is president of the TSV Quakenbrück (with the Artland Dragons).

He served as the honorary mayor of Quakenbrück from 2011 to 2014. 2014 he won the mayoral elections of the Artland municipality (which includes Quakenbrück) and subsequently resigned from his parliament office that year. He served as mayor of Artland since, but due to his age didn't run again for office in 2021.

== See also ==
- List of Social Democratic Party of Germany politicians
