= Sigmar Gabriel =

German politician (born 1959)

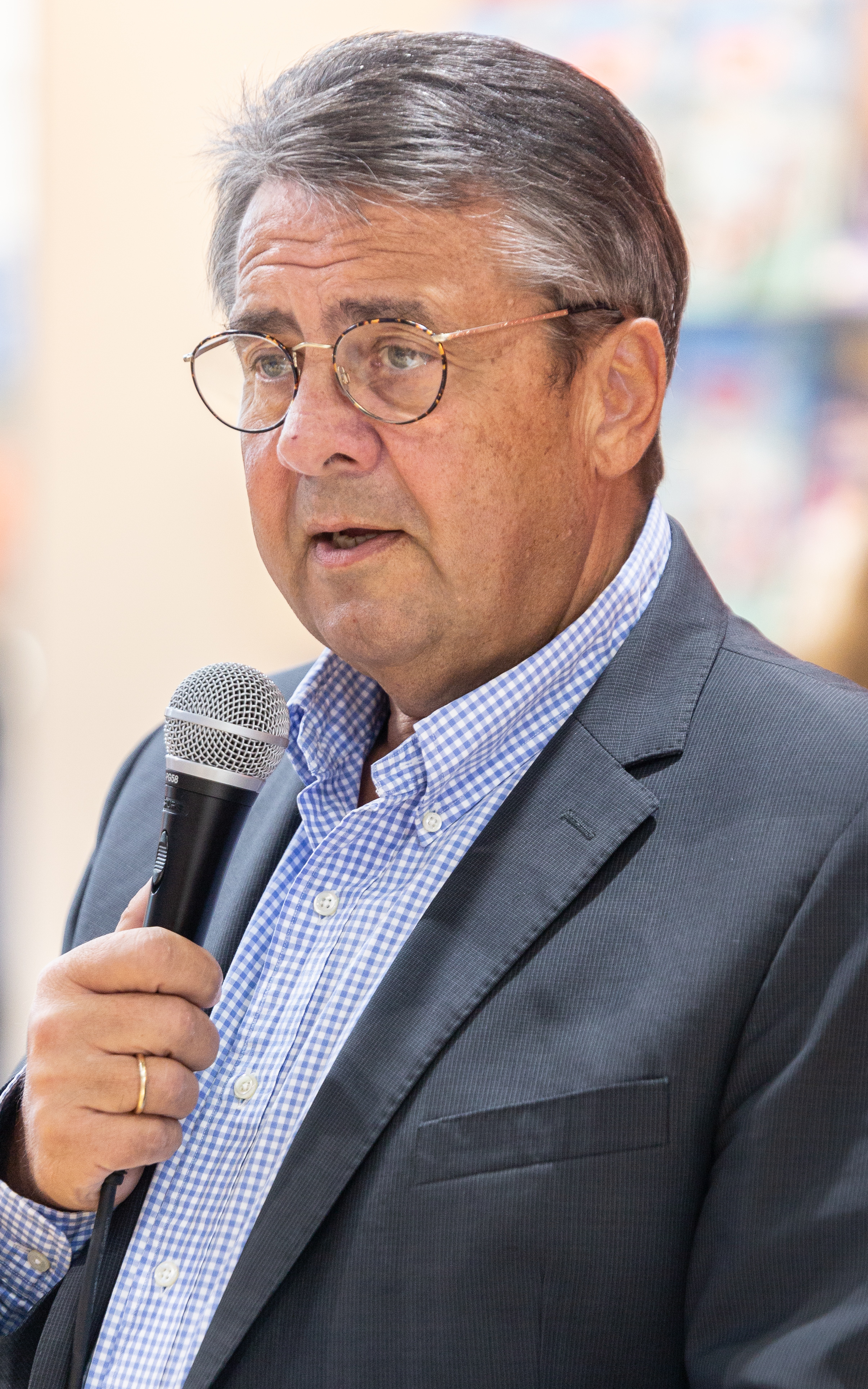
- Gabriel in 2018

Vice Chancellor of Germany
- In office 17 December 2013 – 14 March 2018
- Chancellor: Angela Merkel
- Preceded by: Philipp Rösler
- Succeeded by: Olaf Scholz

Leader of the Social Democratic Party
- In office 13 November 2009 – 19 March 2017
- Deputy: Olaf Scholz; Hannelore Kraft; Ralf Stegner; Aydan Özoğuz; Manuela Schwesig; Thorsten Schäfer-Gümbel
- Preceded by: Franz Müntefering
- Succeeded by: Martin Schulz

Minister of Foreign Affairs
- In office 27 January 2017 – 14 March 2018
- Chancellor: Angela Merkel
- Preceded by: Frank-Walter Steinmeier
- Succeeded by: Heiko Maas

Minister of Economic Affairs and Energy
- In office 17 December 2013 – 27 January 2017
- Chancellor: Angela Merkel
- Preceded by: Philipp Rösler (Economics and Technology)
- Succeeded by: Brigitte Zypries

Minister of the Environment, Nature Conservation and Nuclear Safety
- In office 22 November 2005 – 27 October 2009
- Chancellor: Angela Merkel
- Preceded by: Jürgen Trittin
- Succeeded by: Norbert Röttgen

Minister-President of Lower Saxony
- In office 15 December 1999 – 4 March 2003
- Deputy: Heidrun Merk; Renate Jürgens-Pieper
- Preceded by: Gerhard Glogowski
- Succeeded by: Christian Wulff

Leader of the Social Democratic Party of Germany in the Landtag of Lower Saxony
- In office 4 March 2003 – 9 November 2005
- Preceded by: Axel Plaue
- Succeeded by: Wolfgang Jüttner
- In office 30 March 1998 – 15 December 1999
- Preceded by: Heinrich Aller
- Succeeded by: Axel Plaue

Member of the Bundestag for Salzgitter – Wolfenbüttel
- In office 18 October 2005 – 3 November 2019
- Preceded by: Wilhelm Schmidt
- Succeeded by: Markus Paschke

Member of the Landtag of Lower Saxony for Goslar
- In office 21 June 1990 – 9 November 2004
- Preceded by: Jürgen Sikora
- Succeeded by: Petra Emmerich-Kopatsch

Personal details
- Born: Sigmar Hartmut Gabriel; 12 September 1959 (age 67) Goslar, West Germany
- Party: Social Democratic Party
- Spouses: Munise Demirel (m. 1989; div. 1998) Anke Stadler (m. 2012)
- Children: 3
- Education: University of Göttingen

Military service
- Allegiance: Germany
- Branch/service: Bundeswehr
- Years of service: 1979–1981
- Unit: Air Force (Luftwaffe)

Sigmar Hartmut Gabriel (born 12 September 1959) is a German politician who was the Federal Minister for Foreign Affairs from 2017 to 2018 and the vice-chancellor of Germany from 2013 to 2018. He was Leader of the Social Democratic Party of Germany (SPD) from 2009 to 2017, which made him the party's longest-serving leader since Willy Brandt. He was the Federal Minister of the Environment from 2005 to 2009 and the Federal Minister for Economic Affairs and Energy from 2013 to 2017. From 1999 to 2003 Gabriel was Minister-President of Lower Saxony.

He represented Salzgitter – Wolfenbüttel in the Bundestag.

Gabriel is a member of the Seeheimer Kreis, an official internal grouping of the party with liberal economic positions.

== Early life and education ==
Gabriel was born in Goslar, West Germany, son of Walter Gabriel (1921–2012), a municipal civil servant, and Antonie Gabriel (1922–2014), a nurse. Gabriel's parents divorced in 1962, and for the next six years he lived with his father and grandmother Lina Gabriel, while his sister lived with their mother. After a lengthy custody battle his mother was awarded custody for both children in 1969.

Gabriel's father was a Lutheran originally from Hirschberg im Riesengebirge in Silesia (now Poland), while his mother was a Catholic originally from Heilsberg in the Ermland (Warmia) region of East Prussia who had most recently lived in Königsberg; both parents came as refugees to West Germany during the flight and expulsion of Germans at the end of the Second World War. Gabriel described his family history as a "wild story of flight and expulsion" and noted that his parents dealt with the trauma of expulsion in different ways. According to Gabriel, his father was physically and emotionally abusive to him and was an enthusiastic supporter of the Nazi Party "until his dying breath;" However, Walter Gabriel never saw active service during the war due to suffering from polio. His mother was involved in relief and solidarity work for Poland during the period of martial law in Poland.

Sigmar Gabriel attended school in Goslar, and served as a soldier in the German Air Force from 1979 to 1981. He studied politics, sociology and German at the University of Göttingen from 1982 and passed the first state examination as a grammar school teacher in 1987 and the second state examination in 1989.

== Political career ==
Gabriel joined the SPD in 1977 and soon held a number of positions in local politics. In 1990, he was first elected to the State Parliament of Lower Saxony, where he led the SPD parliamentary group from 1998 until 1999.

=== Minister-President of Lower Saxony, 1999–2003 ===
On 15 December 1999, after the resignation of Gerhard Glogowski, who had succeeded Gerhard Schröder in office, Gabriel became Minister-President of Lower Saxony. He had previously won an internal party vote against Wolfgang Jüttner and Thomas Oppermann. He served until 4 March 2003. During these years, he was widely presented as a protégé of Schröder, and even as a possible successor as chancellor.

After being voted out of office in 2003, Gabriel became the SPD's "Representative for Pop Culture and Pop Discourse" from 2003 to 2005, for which he was bestowed the nickname Siggi Pop.

=== Federal Minister for the Environment, Nature Conservation and Nuclear Safety, 2005–2009 ===
He was elected in Salzgitter – Wolfenbüttel in the 2005 federal election.

From 2005 to 2009 Gabriel was the Federal Minister for the Environment, Nature Conservation and Nuclear Safety in the first cabinet of Angela Merkel (CDU).

During his time in office, Gabriel promoted the International Renewable Energy Agency. He also led the German delegation to the 2006 United Nations Climate Change Conference in Nairobi. In 2007, when Germany held the presidency of the Council of the European Union, he led the negotiations between European Union environment ministers on an ambitious effort to cut greenhouse gas emissions to 20 percent below 1990 levels. That same year, he accompanied Merkel on a two-day visit to Greenland to see the Ilulissat Icefjord, a UNESCO world heritage site, and the Sermeq Kujalleq glacier in order to get a firsthand look at the effects of global warming.

=== Opposition leader, 2009–2013 ===
Following the SPD's defeat in the federal election of 2009, Franz Müntefering resigned from the position of party chairman of the Social Democratic Party. Gabriel was nominated as his successor and was elected on 13 November 2009. He was re-elected as party chairman for a further two years at the SPD party conference in Berlin on 5 December 2011, receiving 91.6 percent of the vote.

During his early years as chairman, Gabriel pushed through internal party reforms. He abolished the party steering committee in favor of an expanded executive committee and led the regular party conventions, the most important meetings for the party. He also played a critical role in founding the Progressive Alliance in 2013 by canceling the SPD payment of its £100,000 yearly membership fee to the Socialist International in January 2012. Gabriel had been critical of the Socialist International's admittance and continuing inclusion of undemocratic "despotic" political movements into the organization.

For the 2013 federal election, Gabriel was considered a possible candidate to challenge incumbent Chancellor Angela Merkel but deemed too “unpopular and undisciplined” at the time. As a consequence, he and the other members of the party's leadership agreed to nominate Peer Steinbrück after Frank-Walter Steinmeier, the party's parliamentary leader, withdrew from the contest.

During the election campaign, Gabriel became the first SPD leader to address a party convention of Alliance '90/The Greens; in his speech, he called for a red–green alliance to defeat Merkel in the elections.

=== Vice-Chancellor and Federal Minister, 2013–2018 ===
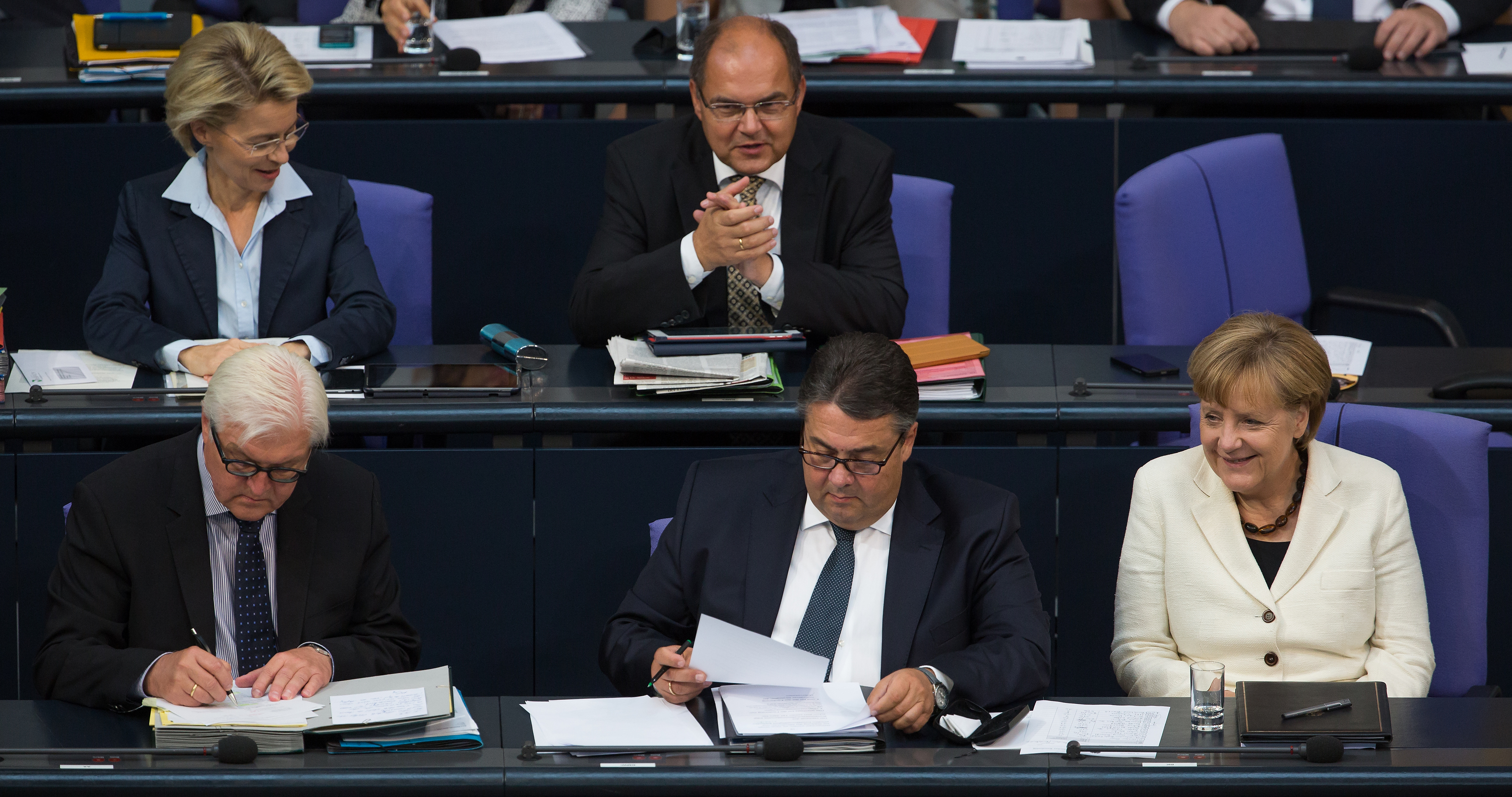
Sigmar Gabriel with Angela Merkel and Frank-Walter Steinmeier; in the background are Christian Schmidt and Ursula von der Leyen, 2014

In 2013, Gabriel turned the Social Democrats’ third successive defeat to Angela Merkel in the federal election into a share of government, after successfully navigating the three-month process of coalition negotiations and a ballot of about 475,000 party members, who endorsed the accord. At the time, he was widely considered to have negotiated skillfully, particularly considering the relative weakness of his party, which had received just over 25 percent of the vote in the elections, against more than 41 percent for Merkel's conservative bloc.

At an SPD convention shortly after the elections, however, Gabriel and the other members of the party's leadership were punished by delegates who re-elected them to their posts with reduced majorities; he received 83.6 percent of members’ ballots after 91.6 percent at the previous vote in 2011.

Gabriel, who serves as vice-chancellor in the third Merkel cabinet, took on responsibility for Germany's energy overhaul as part of a newly configured Economy Ministry. Since late 2016, he has been a member of the German government's cabinet committee on Brexit at which ministers discuss organizational and structural issues related to the United Kingdom's departure from the European Union.

As Minister of the Economy in 2014, Gabriel tried to choke the exports of the German defence industry.

Speculation about Gabriel's future as leader of the SPD has been brewing since he registered just 74 percent in a party delegates' vote of confidence in December 2015 – the lowest for an SPD leader in 20 years. On 24 January 2017 Gabriel announced that we will not run as candidate for chancellor in 2017; instead, he proposed that Martin Schulz become candidate and replace him as party chairman.

Gabriel also announced that he would succeed Frank-Walter Steinmeier as Minister for Foreign Affairs. He took office on 27 January 2017, the previous Parliamentary State Secretary Brigitte Zypries followed Gabriel as Federal Minister of Economic Affairs and Energy.

At the Munich Security Conference in February 2017 Gabriel called on NATO members, rather than focus mainly on traditional defense, to focus more on the "root causes of conflict" such as "poverty and climate".

Gabriel proposed in March 2017 that expenses such as development aid should be considered as part of the NATO 2% GDP defense expenditure guideline. NATO Secretary-General Jens Stoltenberg later responded that development aid cannot be part of defence spending.

As Foreign Minister Gabriel has said Germany's "arms will remain outstretched" to the US to continue the trans-Atlantic alliance between the two countries. However he has said that Germany will step into global markets the US abandons and take on a bigger role on the international stage if Donald Trump continues his protectionist and isolationist policies.

== Life after politics ==
Since leaving public office, Gabriel has taken on various paid and unpaid positions.

In 2018, Gabriel was among six of 11 candidates nominated by Siemens to join the board of directors of Siemens Alstom, a planned merger of two railway companies; he ended up not taking the office when the merger was prohibited by the European Commission amid competition concerns. Also in 2018, the German government's ethics committee rejected his request to join the supervisory board of Kulczyk Investments, citing potential conflict of interest. In 2019, he rejected an offer to become the head of the German Association of the Automotive Industry (VDA) after media reports that he was in line for the post caused a public outcry and prompted accusations of nepotism.

In June 2019 he said Donald Trump is right to criticize China and to negotiate with North Korea. Gabriel has been chairman of the Atlantic Bridge and member of the Trilateral Commission as well as the European Council on Foreign Relations. He has also been a member of the Board of Trustees of the International Crisis Group since May 2018 and since March 2019 the advisory board of Deloitte. In the summer semester of 2018, he was a lecturer at the Rheinische Friedrich-Wilhelms-Universität Bonn and for three weeks in the fall of 2018 a visiting lecturer at Harvard University. Since November 2019, he has been working at Eurasia Group as a political consultant. On 24 January 2020, Deutsche Bank nominated him for a seat on the supervisory board of its financial institution. This announcement caused partly critical reactions. For example, Abgeordnetenwatch demanded a grace period of three years for such a change, arguing that it would harm the understanding of democracy if Gabriel less than two years after his departure as vice chancellor "now silvering his address book to Deutsche Bank, which he could fill so bulging only as a representative of the people". On 20 May 2020, Gabriel was elected as a member of the Integrity Committee of Deutsche Bank to the supervisory board of the same company. By his own account, Gabriel worked as a consultant for Tönnies Holding from March to the end of May 2020. According to Gabriel, he was to find out what trade restrictions were planned for meat products when exporting to Asia in the wake of African swine fever and how export permits could still be obtained.

Since 2020, the German-Israeli Future Forum Foundation has run the Sylke Tempel Fellowship program under Gabriel's auspices. From 2021 to 2022, he was a member of the Trilateral Commission’s Task Force on Global Capitalism in Transition, chaired by Carl Bildt, Kelly Grier and Takeshi Niinami.

== Other activities ==
=== Corporate boards ===
- Rheinmetall, Member of the Supervisory Board (since 2025)
- Heristo, Member of the Supervisory Board (since 2023)
- Bosch, Member of the International Advisory Committee (since 2022)
- Thyssenkrupp Steel Europe, Chair of the Supervisory Board (since 2022)
- Siemens Energy, Member of the supervisory board (since 2020)
- Deutsche Bank, Member of the supervisory board (since 2020)
- Eurasia Group, Senior Advisor (since 2019)
- Deloitte Germany, Member of the advisory board (since 2019)
- KfW, ex-officio Member of the Board of Supervisory Directors (2013-2018)
- RAG-Stiftung, Ex-Officio Member of the Board of Trustees (2013-2017)
- Volkswagen, Member of the supervisory board (1999-2003)

=== Non-profits ===
- Peace of Westphalia Prize, Member of the Jury (since 2022)
- Bonner Akademie für Forschung und Lehre praktischer Politik (BAPP), Member of the Board of Trustees (since 2009)
- German Association for Small and Medium-Sized Businesses (BVMW), Member of the Political Advisory Board (since 2018)
- European Council on Foreign Relations (ECFR), Member (since 2018)
- International Crisis Group, Member of the Board of Trustees (since 2018)
- Trilateral Commission, Member of the European Group (since 2018)
- Denkwerk Demokratie, Member of the Advisory Board
- Deutsche Nationalstiftung, Member of the Senate
- Friedrich Ebert Foundation (FES), Member
- Til Schweiger Foundation, Member of the Advisory Board
- World Economic Forum (WEF), Member of the Global Future Council on Geopolitics (2018-2019)
- Aktion Deutschland Hilft (Germany's Relief Coalition), Ex-Officio Member of the Board of Trustees (2017-2018)
- Friedrich Ebert Foundation, Deputy Chairman (2005–2009)
- German Energy Agency (DENA), Member of the supervisory board (2005–2009)
- Max Planck Institute of Experimental Medicine, Member of the Board of Trustees (2005–2009)
- IG Metall, Member
- Lions Club, Member

== Political positions ==
=== Foreign policy ===
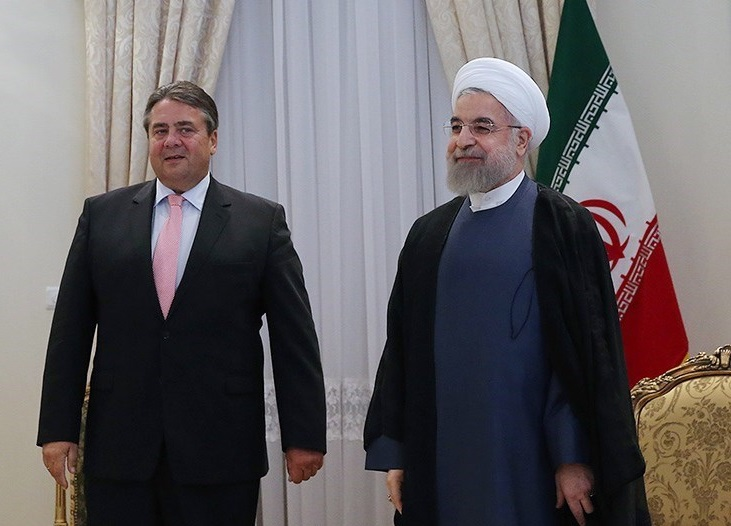
Gabriel meets Iranian President Hassan Rouhani, 16 July 2015.

Gabriel has been staunchly against German soldiers remaining in Afghanistan. In 2010, he called for an independent assessment that would determine whether the U.S. counter-insurgency strategy would succeed. However, he voted in favor of extending German participation in the NATO-led security mission ISAF in 2009, 2010, 2011 and 2012.

On the occasion of the sixtieth anniversary of the founding of the State of Israel, Gabriel participated in the first joint cabinet meeting of the governments of Germany and Israel in Jerusalem in March 2008. In 2012, after having visited Hebron and the Palestinian territories, he said the Palestinians in those areas were systematically discriminated against and called Israel an "apartheid regime".

While German members of parliament call out Iran's human rights violations and Nazanin Boniadi, advocate for the Center for Human Rights in Iran, described "systemic gender apartheid" where women advocating equal rights are regularly imprisoned, homosexuality is illegal and can carry the death penalty, Gabriel became the first top-level German government visitor to Iran in 13 years as well as the first senior figure from any major western government to visit the country since it struck an agreement on its nuclear program, the Joint Comprehensive Plan of Action, only days earlier. Travelling with a delegation of German industry representatives keen to move back into the Iranian market, he met with President Hassan Rouhani, Foreign Minister Mohammad Javad Zarif and Oil Minister Bijan Namdar Zangeneh.

In one of the strongest comments by Germany to push for a federal solution for Ukraine, Gabriel told German weekly Welt am Sonntag in August 2014 that a federal structure was the only option to resolve pro-Russian unrest in the country. He added that Germany's priority was to prevent direct conflict between Russia and its southern neighbour. Commenting on the international sanctions regime against Russia, Gabriel stated in early 2015 that “we want to help resolve the conflict in Ukraine but don’t want to force Russia to its knees.” He later suggested that Europe consider easing sanctions in exchange for cooperation in Syria. Ukrainian-American historian Alexander J. Motyl has accused Gabriel of "appeasement" and "a complete betrayal of everything democratic socialists claim to stand for."

In September 2015, amid the European migrant crisis, Gabriel visited the Zaatari refugee camp in Jordan to learn more about the plight of Syrians fleeing the violence in the ongoing Syrian civil war that erupted in 2011. Gabriel publicly urged Saudi Arabia to stop supporting religious radicals, amid growing concern among about the country's funding of Wahhabi mosques in Germany which are accused of breeding dangerous Islamists.

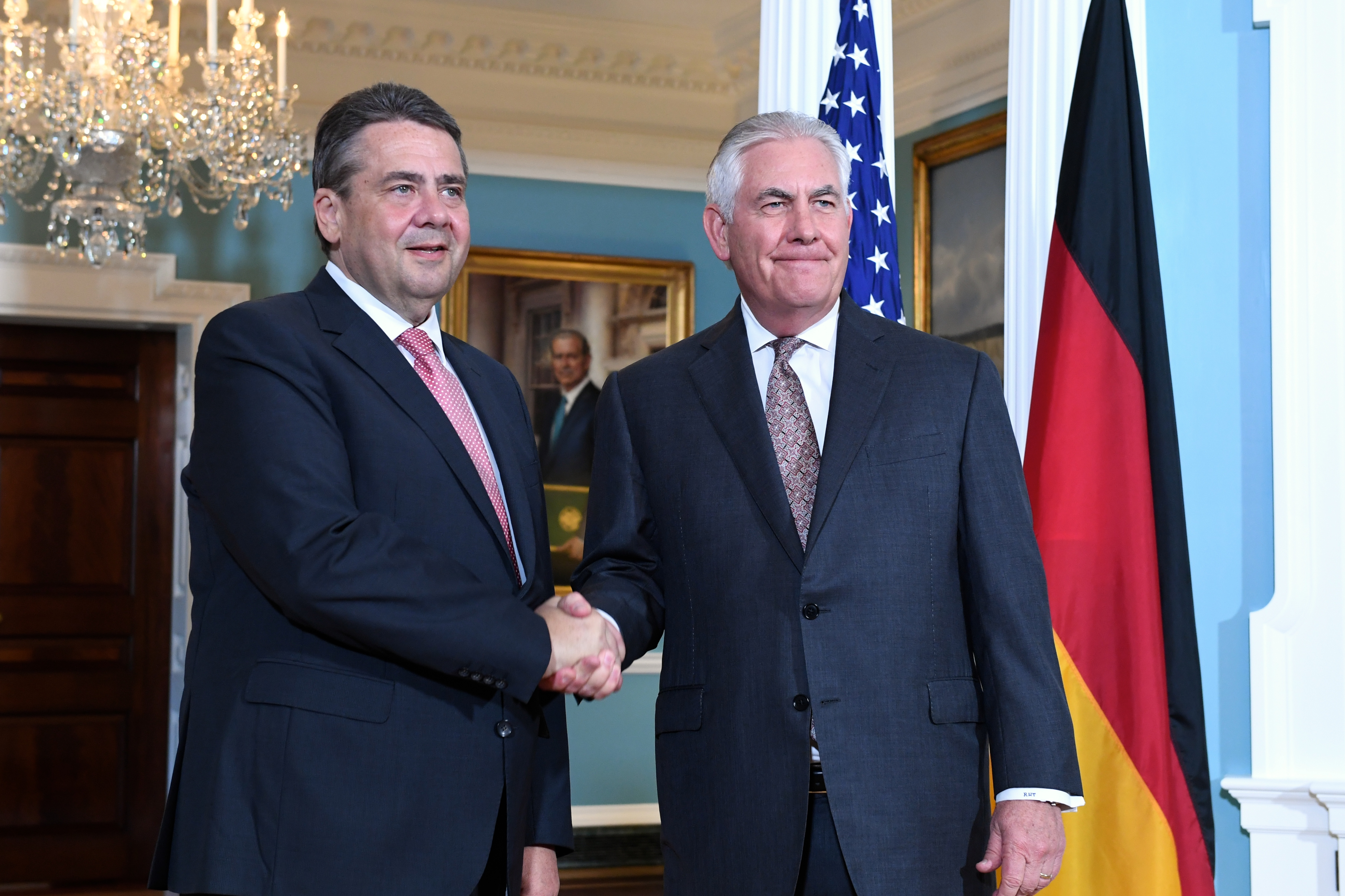
Gabriel and U.S. Secretary of State Rex Tillerson in Washington, D.C., 17 May 2017

In January 2016, Gabriel participated in the first joint cabinet meeting of the governments of Germany and Turkey in Berlin. Later that year, he called any accession of Turkey to the European Union in the near term an "illusion."

After the G7 summit in 2017, Gabriel stated that the United States, with Donald Trump as president, has "weakened" the West and that the balance of power has now shifted. The remark comes days after Merkel stated, in an apparent policy shift, that "Europeans must really take our fate into our own hands".

In June 2017, Gabriel criticized the draft of new U.S. sanctions against Russia that target EU–Russia energy projects, including Nord Stream 2 gas pipeline. In a joint statement Gabriel and Austria's Chancellor Christian Kern said that "Europe's energy supply is a matter for Europe, and not for the United States of America." They also said: "To threaten companies from Germany, Austria and other European states with penalties on the U.S. market if they participate in natural gas projects such as Nord Stream 2 with Russia or finance them introduces a completely new and very negative quality into European-American relations."

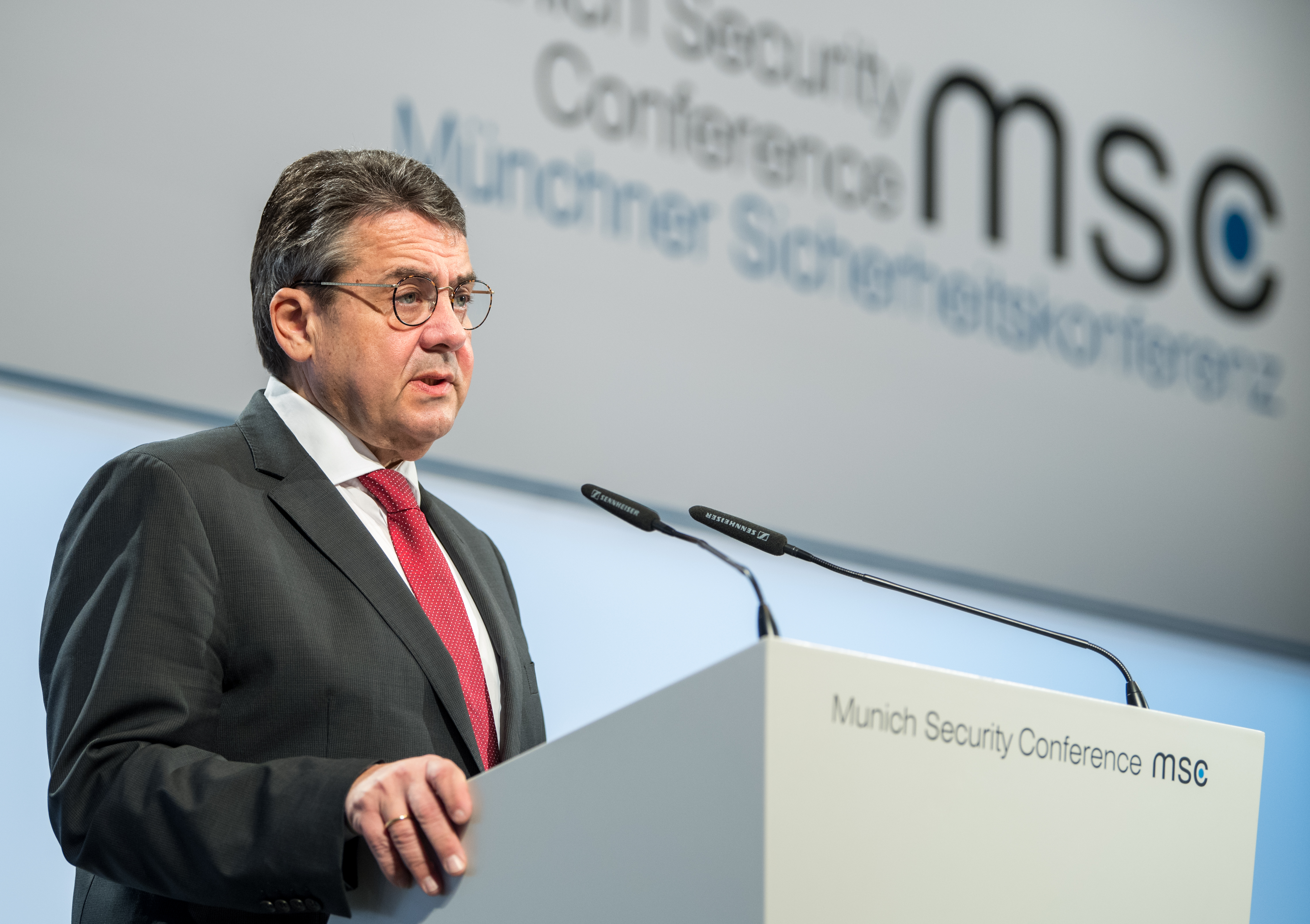
Gabriel during the MSC 2018

Gabriel is a supporter of the Campaign for the Establishment of a United Nations Parliamentary Assembly, an organisation which campaigns for democratic reformation of the United Nations, and the creation of a more accountable international political system. He argued the U.N. needed to be made "more effective, transparent, and democratic through a reform of its structures and decision-making procedures".

In February 2018, Gabriel accused Russia and China of trying to "undermine" the liberal Western world order. He said that "Nobody should attempt to divide the European Union: not Russia, not China and also not the United States." In September 2018, Gabriel said that "Ukrainians, Belarusians and Russians experienced unfathomable suffering in World War II. We have a responsibility there."

In March 2018, after his departure as German foreign minister, Gabriel published an opinion piece about the future of the relations between Turkey (under AKP rule) and the West, where he advocated for an inclusive stance towards Turkey and criticized the policy of the United States in that regard. In February 2020, he joined around fifty former European prime ministers and foreign ministers in signing an open letter published by British newspaper The Guardian to condemn U.S. President Donald Trump’s Middle East peace plan, saying it would create an apartheid-like situation in occupied Palestinian territory.

=== Economic policy ===
On the occasion of the G20 summit in 2011, Gabriel joined Ed Miliband, the leader of the UK's Labour Party, and Håkan Juholt, the chairman of the Swedish Social Democratic Party, in suggesting a “new deal” for economic growth. They also said G20 leaders should commit to the introduction of a financial transaction tax for all major financial centers and an agreement to separate consumer and investment banking.

In a letter to the European Commissioner for Trade, Karel De Gucht, Gabriel stated in March 2014 that “special investment-protection provisions are not required in an agreement between the E.U. and the U.S” on a Transatlantic Trade and Investment Partnership (TTIP). Instead, he later called for a public trade and investment court to replace the current system of private arbitration, and to enable appeals against arbitration rulings. Meanwhile, he has continuously warned against overblowing expectations for an economic boost from TTIP but maintained that the pact was needed to set high common standards for consumers. By August 2016, Gabriel said talks on TTIP had "de facto" failed.

In September 2014, Gabriel rejected the inclusion of an investor-state dispute settlement clause in the Comprehensive Economic and Trade Agreement (CETA) between Canada and the European Union, prompting a renegotiation that delayed the entry into force of the agreement. Following the renegotiations, he championed CETA to demonstrate the center-left party's business credentials.

In a 2014 meeting with French economist Thomas Piketty, whose best-selling work Capital in the Twenty-First Century calls for a wealth tax, Gabriel rejected such a progressive levy on capital as “crazy” for business. He also argued that a wealth tax would generate no more than 8 billion euros ($9.9 billion) a year.

Together with his French counterpart Emmanuel Macron, Gabriel presented a joint proposal in 2015 to set up a common eurozone budget.

=== Energy policy ===
Following the Fukushima Daiichi nuclear disaster in 2011, Gabriel harshly criticized the International Atomic Energy Agency, saying it had promoted “the construction of nuclear plants in all parts of the world, even in war and crisis regions. That needs to stop.”

In 2015, Gabriel opposed a European Commission proposal for regional power-capacity markets, according to which utilities are paid for providing backup electricity at times when power generated by renewable sources, such as the sun and wind, cannot supply the grid. A free market backstopped by an emergency reserve will be cheaper and work just as well as capacity markets, Gabriel told Handelsblatt. He later warned against a hasty exit from coal-fired power generation, concerned that such a move could pile more pressure on producers still wrestling with the planned shutdown of nuclear plants by 2022.

=== Arms exports ===
Early in his tenure as Federal Minister of Economic Affairs and Energy, Gabriel vowed a much more cautious approach to licensing arms exports, unnerving the sizeable defense industry and signaling a change in policy from the previous coalition government under which sales rose. In August 2014, he withdrew permission for Rheinmetall to build a military training center east of Moscow.

Gabriel was bound by pledges to his SPD to reduce arms sales to states that abuse human rights and the rule of law or where such sales may contribute to political instability. He stated that controls over the final destination of small arms sold to such nations are still insufficient. However, he also indicated that the government would not universally block deals with countries outside of Germany's traditional alliances. Deals with such countries could be approved because of "special foreign-policy or security interests." He suggested that in the future the Federal Foreign Office may be a more appropriate body for deciding whether to allow exports, and called for common European arms exports. In late 2015, his ministry approved a merger of German tank maker Krauss-Maffei Wegmann (KMW) with the French armoured vehicle maker Nexter. Gabriel has been criticized by opposition leaders and the press for failing to prevent several deals that resulted in a significant rise in German arms exports during his tenure, although a paradigm shift (lifting of the prohibition against arms exports in zones of war and crisis) already occurred before that.

=== Digital policy ===
In May 2014, Gabriel and France's economy and digital minister Arnaud Montebourg sent the European Commissioner for Competition, Joaquín Almunia, a letter criticizing the settlement of a three-year antitrust probe into Google; Gabriel later “warmly welcomed” the launch of EU antitrust charges against Google in April 2015.

In September 2014, Gabriel called Google, Amazon.com and Apple Inc. “anti-social” for skirting appropriate taxation. In early 2015, Gabriel and his French counterpart Emmanuel Macron wrote in a joint letter to Vice-President of the European Commission Andrus Ansip that the growing power of some online giants “warrants a policy consultation with the aim of establishing an appropriate general regulatory framework for ‘essential digital platforms.’”

In 2016, during a series of Chinese bids for German engineering firms, Gabriel publicly called for a European-wide safeguard clause which could stop foreign takeovers of firms whose technology is deemed strategic for the future economic success of the region.

=== Human rights ===
In April 2014, human rights lawyer Mo Shaoping was blocked from meeting Gabriel during his visit to China, despite the minister saying ahead of the meeting that he wanted to meet critical voices.

During a 2015 visit to King Salman of Saudi Arabia, Gabriel launched an unusual public effort to persuade Saudi authorities to free imprisoned writer Raif Badawi and grant him clemency, amplifying Germany’s political voice in a region in which its influence had largely been limited to economic issues in years past. He had been urged by MPs and human rights organizations to take up Badawi's case before his trip. His outspoken criticism of Saudi justice was unusual for Western leaders visiting the country, a close ally for the West in fighting terrorism and Islamic State militants, particularly given Germany’s status as Saudi Arabia’s third-largest source of imports. While the U.S. State Department had previously also criticized the Badawi sentence, U.S. Secretary of State John Kerry did not talk about the case publicly when he visited Riyadh only days before.

During a subsequent trip to Qatar, Gabriel called on the emir of Qatar, Sheikh Tamim Bin Hamad Al Thani and other senior officials to do better in protecting foreign household workers who face abuse from their employers.

== Controversy ==
=== Thilo Sarrazin ===
In 2010, Gabriel defined as "verbal violence" the speeches of Thilo Sarrazin, his party colleague who wrote critically about immigration by accusing Muslims of refusing to integrate and of “dumbing down” German society, Gabriel stated that, although Sarrazin described many things that were accurate, his conclusions did not fit into the egalitarian “ideals” of social democracy anymore.

=== Kaiser’s takeover ===
In 2016, a German court nullified Gabriel's controversial decision to grant special permission for the country's biggest supermarket chain Edeka to buy grocery store chain Kaiser's, owned by Tengelmann Group. The judges raised questions about the minister's "bias and a lack of neutrality" in the case, saying he had held secret discussions during the decision-making process.

== Personal life ==
Gabriel has a daughter, Saskia, born in 1989, with his former girlfriend, who is of Jewish origin and whose grandparents were murdered in Auschwitz. Gabriel was subsequently married to his former high school student Munise Demirel, who is of Turkish origin, from 1989 to 1998, and they had no children. In 2012 he married dentist Anke Stadler, with whom he has been in a relationship since 2008; their daughter Marie was born in 2012. His daughter Thea was born on 4 March 2017.

In December 2016, Gabriel underwent bariatric surgery in Offenbach to shrink his stomach and help manage his diabetes.

== See also ==
- List of foreign ministers in 2017
- List of current foreign ministers

Political offices
Preceded by Gerhard Glogowski	Minister President of Lower Saxony; 1999–2003	Succeeded by Christian Wulff
Preceded by Jürgen Trittin	Minister of the Environment, Nature Conservation and Nuclear Safety; 2005–2009	Succeeded by Norbert Röttgen
Preceded by Philipp Rösler	Minister for Economic Affairs and Energy; 2013–2017	Succeeded by Brigitte Zypries
Preceded by Philipp Rösler	Vice-Chancellor of Germany; 2013–2018	Succeeded by Olaf Scholz
Preceded by Frank-Walter Steinmeier	Minister for Foreign Affairs; 2017–2018	Succeeded by Heiko Maas
Party political offices
Preceded by Franz Müntefering	Leader of the Social Democratic Party; 2009–2017	Succeeded by Martin Schulz
