= Karl Olfers =

German politician (1888–1968)

Karl Olfers (April 14, 1888, in Dorum – April 22, 1968, in Cuxhaven) was a German politician and member of the Social Democratic Party of Germany. From 1946 to 1952 and from 1956 to 1966 he was Mayor of Cuxhaven and from 1946 to 1955 and from 1959 to 1963 President of the Lower Saxony State Parliament.

== Biography ==
=== Early life ===
Olfers attended elementary school and continuing education schools. Then he learned carpentry. He was a soldier from 1909 to 1911 and took part in the First World War.

From 1925 to 1933 he was the managing director of Bauhütte Cuxhaven, the housing construction company founded in 1922 by the workers' movement. The residential buildings de Bauhütte from the interwar period with the clinker brick facades characterize the cityscape of Cuxhaven. The "Olfer stone currency" was known during the period of inflation, when bricks were used as emergency money in trade. From 1933 to 1944 he worked as an insurance agent after he was removed from office under the Nazi regime and repeatedly arrested for resistance. In 1944 he was drafted into military service.

=== Politics ===
Olfers joined a trade union in 1907 and the Social Democratic Party of Germany in 1912. From 1919 he became a city representative, member of the city council and from 1924 second mayor of Cuxhaven, as a representative of Max Bleicken (DDP). In 1933 he was a member of the state committee, the supervisory board of the state fishing company and other public companies, before he was removed from office by the Nazi regime and repeatedly arrested for resistance.

From 1919 to 1933 Olfers was a member of the Hamburg Parliament for the SPD. Cuxhaven belonged to Hamburg from 1394 to 1937.

=== West Germany ===
After the end of the Second World War and the establishment of West Germany, he participated in the reconstruction of the SPD in Cuxhaven and the Weser region. He also became city councilor in 1945 and mayor of Cuxhaven in 1946, which he remained until 1952. From 1956 to 1966 he was again Mayor of Cuxhaven.

In 1946 he was elected to the Lower Saxony state parliament, whose president he was from 1946 to 1955 and from 1959 to 1963.
