= Minister-President of Lower Saxony =

German state head of government

- Ministerpräsident des Landes Niedersachsen
- Coat of arms of Lower Saxony

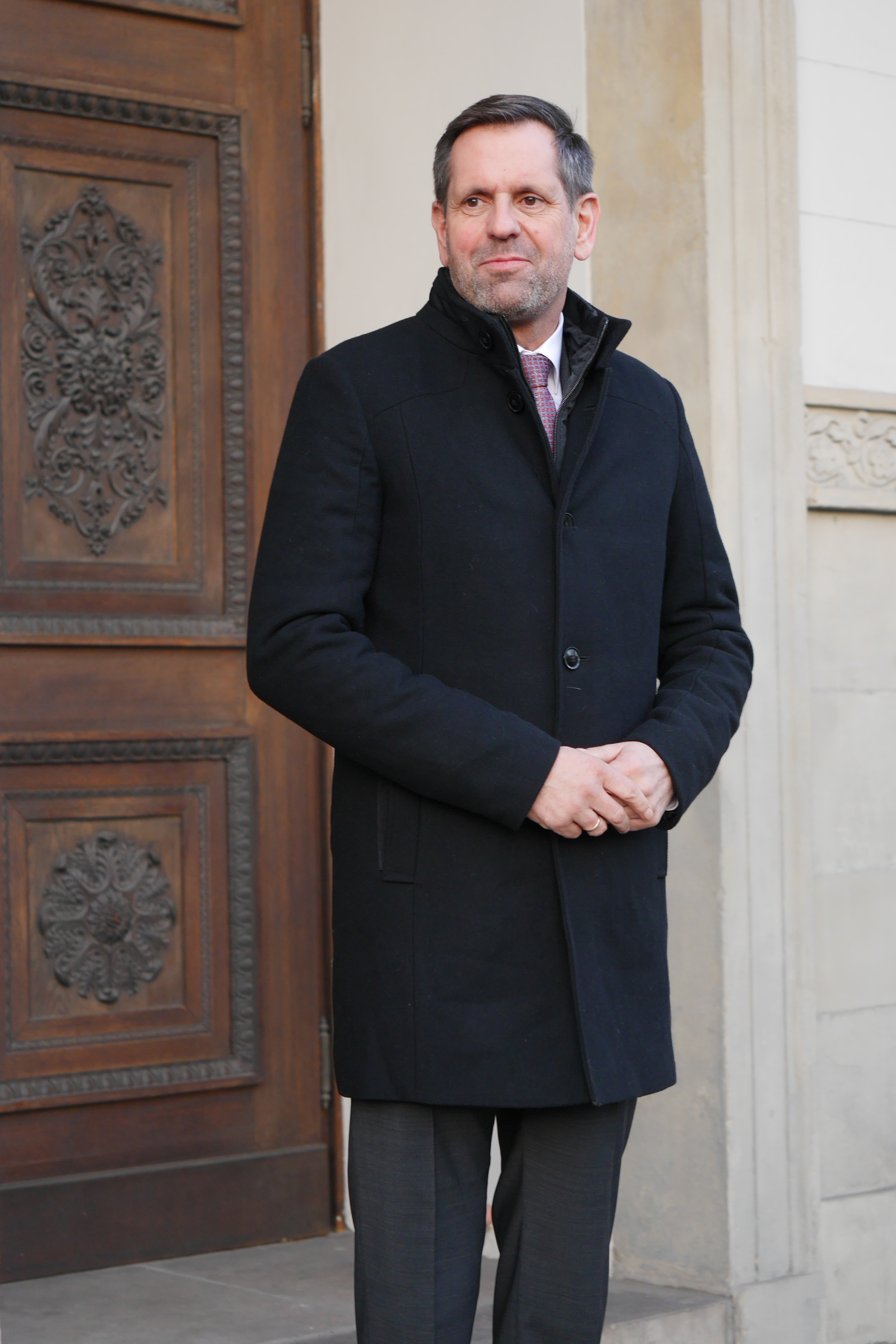
- Incumbent; Olaf Lies since 20 May 2025
- Residence: Hanover
- Appointer: Landtag of Lower Saxony
- Term length: Pending resignation or the election of a successor
- Inaugural holder: Hinrich Wilhelm Kopf
- Formation: 1 November 1946
- Salary: regulated by legislation (€13521, as of 2011)
- Website: www.state-chancellery.niedersachsen.de

The minister-president of Lower Saxony (German: Ministerpräsident des Landes Niedersachsen), also referred to as the premier or prime minister, is the head of government of the German state of Lower Saxony. The position was created in 1946, when the states of Brunswick, Oldenburg, Schaumburg-Lippe and the State of Hanover were merged to form the state of Lower Saxony. The current minister-president is Olaf Lies, heading a coalition government between the Social Democrats and the Greens. Lies succeeded Stephan Weil after his resignation in 2025.

The office of the minister-president is known as the state chancellery (German: Staatskanzlei), and is located in the capital of Hanover, along with the rest of the cabinet departments.

The state of Lower Saxony sees itself in the tradition notably of the Kingdom of Hanover, having adopted many of its symbols. For the predecessor office in the Kingdom of Hanover, see Privy Council of Hanover.

== Title ==
The German title Ministerpräsident may be translated literally as minister-president, although the state government sometimes uses the title prime minister in English. Further, some third parties refer to the position in this fashion.

An alternate English translation is premier, the title given to heads of state governments in other federal systems such as Australia, Canada and South Africa.

== Origin of the office ==
After the Second World War, the states of Brunswick, Oldenburg, Schaumburg-Lippe and the State of Hanover were administered as part of the zone allocated to the British military administration. With the passage of time, the British government began to back the advocates of a merger of the states. Hinrich Wilhelm Kopf, who went on to become Lower Saxony's first minister-president, was a fervent advocate of the merger towards the British military authorities. On 23 October 1946, the British administration announced that they would support a merger of the states, as proposed by Kopf.

Consequently, the four states were merged to form the state of Lower Saxony via Ordinance No. 55 of 1 November 1946. Article 3 of the Ordinance created the position of minister-president:

"Subject to the provisions of any legislation which may be enacted pursuant to this Ordinance, the executive authority of Lower Saxony shall be exercised by a Cabinet, the Head of which shall be known as 'Ministerpräsident'"

Article 4 of Ordinance No. 55 stipulated the appointment of the minister-president by the military government, until the holding of free legislative elections in 1947. The British military administration then appointed Hinrich Wilhelm Kopf, the erstwhile minister-president of the former state of Hanover, to serve as the first minister-president of Lower Saxony.

== Constitutional practice ==
=== Election and removal ===
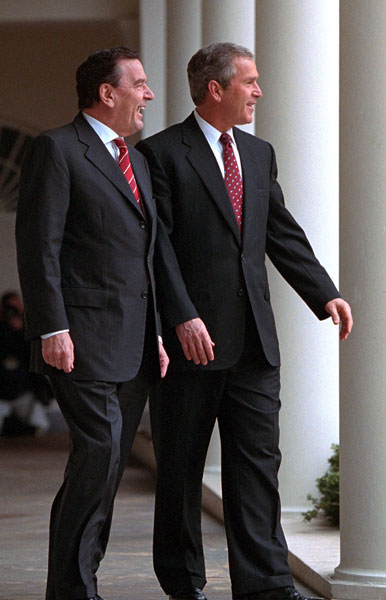
Gerhard Schröder (here with U.S. president George W. Bush) was the minister-president of Lower Saxony (1990–1998) before becoming chancellor

The minister-president is elected by the Landtag of Lower Saxony, by a majority of its members in a secret ballot. However, the person elected does not have to be a Member of the Landtag. The only restriction is that the minister-president may not be a member of the Bundestag. Before assuming his duties, the minister-president-elect takes the following oath before the members of the Landtag:

"I swear that I will devote my strength to the people and the state, preserve and defend the Basic Law of the Federal Republic of Germany and the constitution of Lower Saxony as well as the laws, perform my duties conscientiously and exercise justice towards all people." (The oath may be taken with or without the affirmation "So help me God")

Upon election, the minister-president then appoints his Cabinet which requires subsequent confirmation by the Landtag. In practical terms, the confirmation of the cabinet is an essential requirement for the minister-president to govern, as until then the cabinet departments would be run by the (possibly defeated) predecessors. The minister-president can be removed by the Landtag, through a constructive vote of no confidence – namely the election of a successor. To this day, no vote of no-confidence has succeeded in the Lower Saxony Landtag, with the last attempt being made in November 1988.

=== Powers and status ===
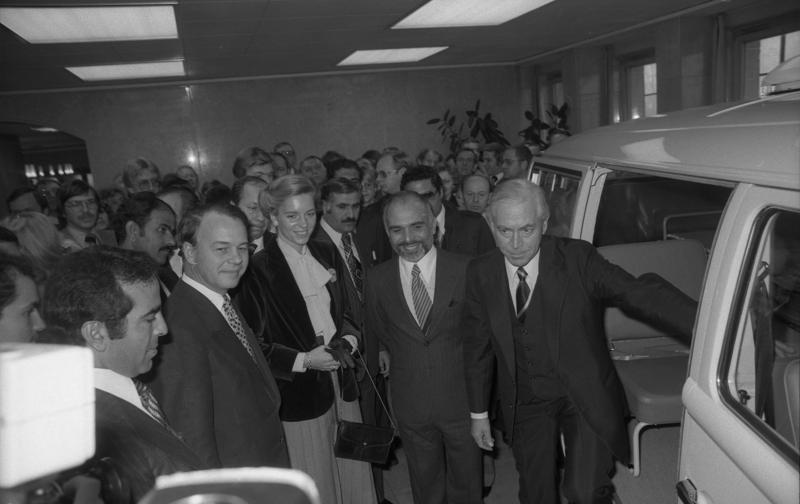
Ernst Albrecht, (second from left) seen here during a 1978 visit by King Hussein of Jordan to the Volkswagen plant in Wolfsburg, was Lower Saxony's sixth minister-president.

According to the Lower Saxony Constitution, the minister-president is the effective leader of the state government, being responsible for the determination and formulation of policy guidelines. In this context, he chairs the cabinet meetings and may cast a tie-breaking vote in case of a stalemate between the ministers. Additionally, the minister-president also represents the Lower Saxony externally and exercises the right of clemency in individual criminal cases. In titular terms, the minister-president is also regarded as head of the state equivalent of Lower Saxony, thereby taking precedence over officials like the presiding officer of the Lower Saxony Landtag.

The minister-president, like the other members of the state government, is not a civil servant—his salary is regulated by law. Like his ministers, the minister-president is subject to the Lower Saxony Ministers Act, which regulates matters of salary, confidentiality and ethics. Furthermore, the minister-president signs treaties made by the state of Lower Saxony and has to be consulted by other cabinet members prior to the start of any negotiations. The minister-president is also authorized to appoint one of his cabinet members as his deputy in case of absence or illness. The only currently known instance of a deputy minister-president taking over the duties of the minister-president was in July 2010, when Jörg Bode (FDP) served as acting minister-president in the interval between Christian Wulff's election as president of Germany and David McAllister's confirmation as minister-president on 1 July 2010. Meetings of the Cabinet traditionally take place in the guesthouse of the Lower Saxony Government, located close to the Hanover Zoological Gardens.

=== Role of the State Chancellery ===
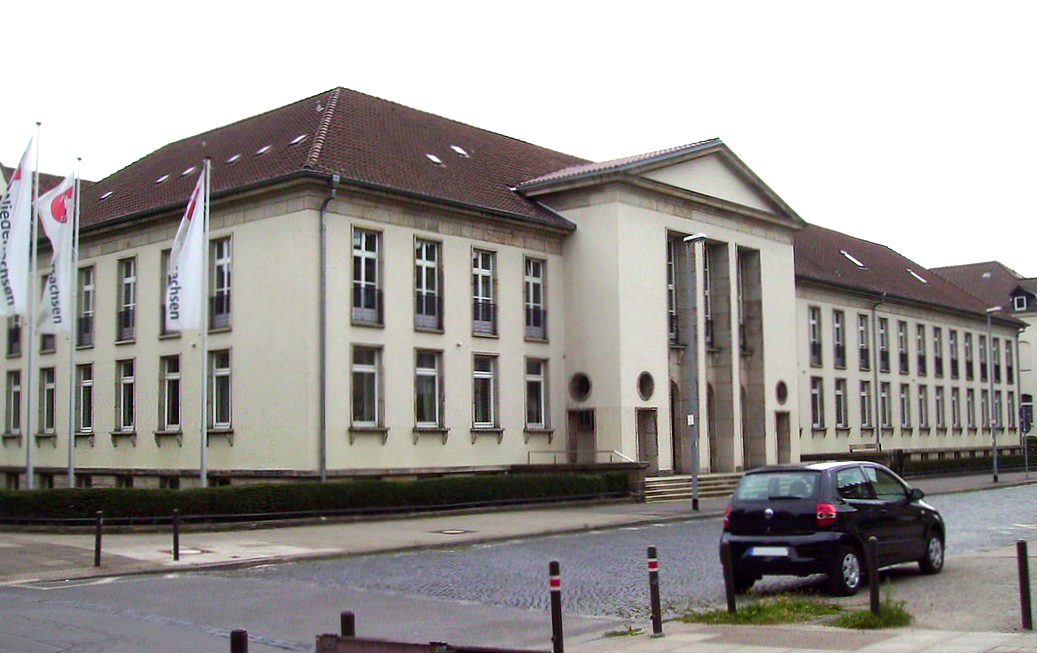
The State Chancellery in Hanover is the official residence of the minister-president of Lower Saxony

The minister-president of Lower Saxony, like his fellow minister-presidents in their respective states, has the staff of the State Chancellery at his disposal. The State Chancellery assists the minister-president in the preparation of draft legislation, the management of day-to-day government business and the coordination of media policy for the entire state. Additionally, it is responsible for relations to the other states in Germany and the European Union.

The State Chancellery, by convention, is headed by a state secretary appointed by the minister-president. The current incumbent is Jörg Mielke. Under the McAllister administration, the State Chancellery was divided into four overall departments (Department 1: Policy Guidelines, Department 2: Legal/Administration/Media, Department 3: Europe/International Cooperation, Department 4: Lower Saxony Representation to the Federal Government). While each of these departments is headed by a separate section head, the Press and Information Office is under the direct purview of the minister-president.

== Role in German politics ==
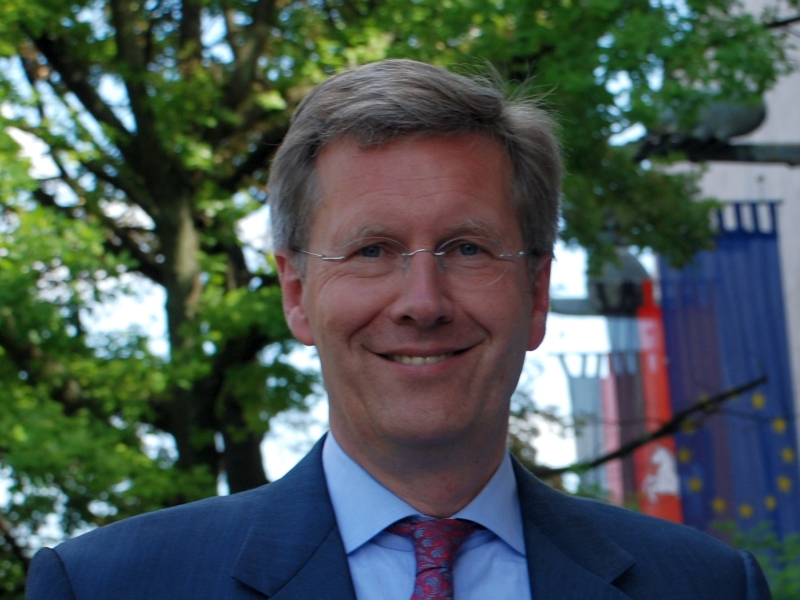
Christian Wulff was the minister-president of Lower Saxony (2003–2010) before being elected president of Germany

As the leader of one of Germany's territorially largest and most populous states, the minister president of Lower Saxony has traditionally been a major player in federal politics: The state's first minister-president, Hinrich Wilhelm Kopf often used the Bundesrat as a forum to oppose the policies of the Adenauer government. Alfred Kubel, one of Kopf's successors, played a major role in negotiating a compromise between all German states on the creation of a national fiscal transfer mechanism (Länderfinanzausgleich). Minister-President Ernst Albrecht, contrary to prevailing majority opinion in his own party, advocated and voted for the ratification of the treaties around which Willy Brandt's Ostpolitik was centred.

Ernst Albrecht was a candidate for the CDU nomination for president in 1979 and chancellor in 1980, Gerhard Schröder became the chancellor of Germany in 1998, his successor Sigmar Gabriel served as the vice-chancellor of Germany between 2013 and 2018 and Christian Wulff was elected president of Germany in 2010. Examples of Lower Saxony's influence on policy debates in federal politics include Ernst Albrecht's advocacy of financial transfers from other states and Gerhard Schröder's usage of Lower Saxony's Bundesrat votes in matters of fiscal and tax policy.

== List ==
Minister-residents of Lower Saxony

Political party: SPD DP CDU

Portrait	Name (Born–Died)	Term of office			Political party	Cabinet
Portrait	Name (Born–Died)	Took office	Left office	Days	Political party	Cabinet
1	Hinrich Wilhelm Kopf (1893–1961); 1st term	9 December 1946	26 May 1955	8 years, 168 days	SPD	I II III IV
2	Heinrich Hellwege (1908–1991)	26 May 1955	12 May 1959	3 years, 351 days	German Party	I
3	Hinrich Wilhelm Kopf (1893–1961); 2nd term	12 May 1959	21 December 1961 died in office	2 years, 223 days	SPD	V
Deputy Minister-President Hermann Ahrens (GB/BHE) served as acting Minister-President from 21 to 29 December 1961.
4	Georg Diederichs (1900–1983)	29 December 1961	8 July 1970	8 years, 191 days	SPD	I II/III IV
5	Alfred Kubel (1909–1999)	8 July 1970	6 February 1976 resigned	5 years, 213 days	SPD	I II
6	Ernst Albrecht (1930–2014)	6 February 1976	21 June 1990	14 years, 135 days	CDU	I/II III IV V
7	Gerhard Schröder (born 1944)	21 June 1990	28 October 1998 resigned	8 years, 129 days	SPD	I II III
8	Gerhard Glogowski (born 1943)	28 October 1998	15 October 1999 resigned	352 days	SPD	I
9	Sigmar Gabriel (born 1959)	15 October 1999	4 March 2003	3 years, 140 days	SPD	I
10	Christian Wulff (born 1959)	4 March 2003	30 June 2010 resigned	7 years, 118 days	CDU	I II
Deputy Minister-President Jörg Bode (FDP) served as acting Minister-President from 30 June to 1 July 2010.
11	David McAllister (born 1971)	1 July 2010	19 February 2013	2 years, 233 days	CDU	I
12	Stephan Weil (born 1958)	19 February 2013	20 May 2025 resigned	12 years, 182 days	SPD	I II III
13	Olaf Lies (born 1967)	20 May 2025	Incumbent	1 year, 119 days	SPD	I
