= Gerhard Glogowski =

German politician

Minister-President of Lower Saxony
- In office 28 October 1998 – 15 December 1999
- Deputy: Heidrun Merk
- Preceded by: Gerhard Schröder
- Succeeded by: Sigmar Gabriel

Deputy Minister-President of Lower Saxony
- In office 21 June 1990 – 27 October 1998
- Minister-President: Gerhard Schröder
- Preceded by: Josef Stock
- Succeeded by: Heidrun Merk

Minister of the Interior of Lower Saxony
- In office 21 June 1990 – 27 October 1998
- Minister-President: Gerhard Schröder
- Preceded by: Josef Stock
- Succeeded by: Heiner Bartling

Member of the Landtag of Lower Saxony
- In office 21 June 1978 – 4 March 2003
- Preceded by: Klaus-Dieter Kühbacher
- Succeeded by: Heidemarie Mundlos
- Constituency: Braunschweig I (1978–1982); SPD List (1982–1986); Braunschweig-Nordwest (1986–2003)

Lord Mayor of Braunschweig
- In office 1986–1990
- Preceded by: Hartmut Scupin
- Succeeded by: Werner Steffens
- In office 1976–1981
- Preceded by: Günter Jaenicke
- Succeeded by: Hartmut Scupin

Personal details
- Born: 11 February 1943 (age 83) Hanover, Prussia, Germany
- Party: Social Democratic Party (SPD)
- Occupation: Economist

Gerhard Glogowski (born 11 February 1943) is a German politician of the Social Democratic Party (SPD).

== Education ==
Born in Hanover, Glogowski finished public school in Bonn and later completed an apprenticeship as toolmaker. In parallel, he attended night school where he finished his Abitur. Then he studied at the University of Economics and Politics in Hamburg until the end as a graduate economist.

== Political career ==
Glogowski grew up in Bonn, his father was a chauffeur of the SPD politician Herbert Wehner and Erich Ollenhauer.

Since 1960, Glogowski is member of the IG Metall.

Glogowski started his political career in 1972 as Mayor of the city district of Waggum in Brunswick. He changed in 1976 upon the chair as Lord Mayor of Brunswick until 1981 and again from 1986 until 1990.

In the meantime, Glogowski was elected as an MP of Lower Saxony in 1978. He maintained the position until 2004.

After the state election in 1990, he was interior minister of Lower Saxony from 21 June 1990 until 27 October 1998 in Gerhard Schröder's cabinet. He succeeded Schröder as Prime Minister of Lower Saxony from 28 October 1998 until 26 November 1999. Glogowski stepped back from this office after various financial irregularities had become public; among other issues, he was accused of accepting coffee and beer for a private party from local companies.

== Life after politics ==
After seven and a half years as president of Eintracht Braunschweig, Glogowski was elected honorary president of the club in 2007.

On 18 December 2007, the Council of the City of Brunswick voted for Glogowski to be awarded the honorary citizenship of Brunswick. The appointment took place on 11 February 2008.

In 1998, Glogowski declared about the far-right political parties in Germany:

"There is no difference between NPD, DVU and Republicans (German REP). To me they are all part of the right-wing radical swamp. That means it's like sorting shit by smell."
