= Ralf Briese =

German politician (1971–2011)

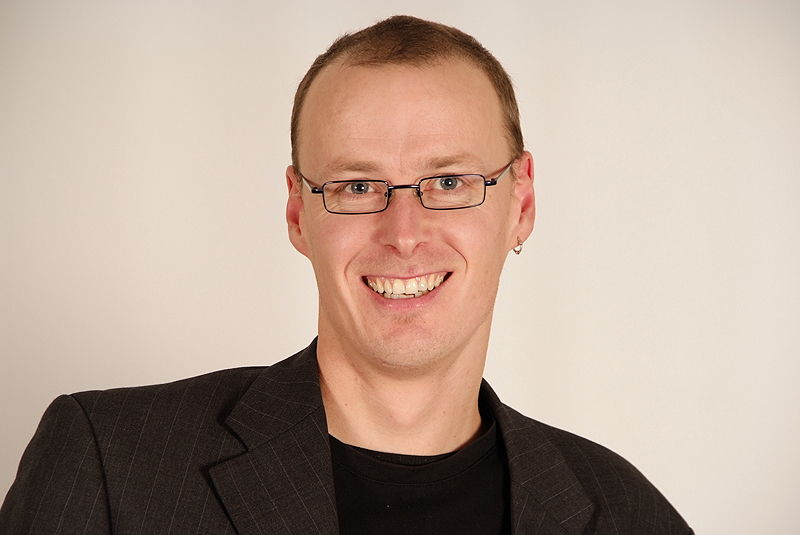
Ralf Briese in November 2009

Ralf Briese (2 March 1971, Leer – 9 October 2011, Oldenburg) was a German politician for the Alliance '90/The Greens.

He was elected to the Lower Saxon Landtag in 2003, and was re-elected on one occasion 2008. Briese was found dead at his home on October 9, 2011 and police concluded that he committed suicide.
