= Ubbo-Emmius-Gymnasium =

Coordinates: 53.232°N 7.451°E

Location
- Ubbo-Emmius-Straße 6.-8. Leer; Germany

Information
- Type: Gymnasium
- Established: 1584; 441 years ago
- School district: Leer
- Principal: Ute Wieligmann
- Staff: 105
- Age range: 10-19
- Accreditation: Abitur / Higher education
- Website: ueg-leer.de

The Ubbo-Emmius-Gymnasium is a gymnasium in the town of Leer in Lower Saxony, Germany.

== History ==
The Ubbo-Emmius-Gymnasium was founded in 1584 as a High School for boys only and girls were not accepted before 1972. It was named after Ubbo Emmius, who was principal at the former Latin school from 1588 to 1596, today being the Ubbo-Emmius-Gymnasium. The older parts of the present school building originate from 1909. In 1973, the building had to be expanded with the increasing number of pupils. In 1998, a small separate building with six classrooms was established on the school grounds. When the school system in Lower Saxony changed upon elimination of the Orientierungsstufe additional school buildings in proximity to the Ubbo-Emmius-Gymnasium were affiliated with it.

== Current situation ==
With about 1300 students, the school is one of the largest of the area and is known for its good quality and special support for their students in many educational branches, e.g.:

- Foreign languages (e.g. general subjects taught in foreign languages are available)
- Music (e.g. big choir, school band, orchestra)
- Mathematics
- Science and technology (e.g. special lessons for interested students in profiles)

Students can take part in exchange programmes (especially to France - Evreux, the US - Topeka/Kansas and to China) and recently to the UK (Bristol). A close cooperation exists to the second Gymnasium in Leer, the Teletta-Groß-Gymnasium.
