= Cabinet Wulff I =

First Cabinet of Christian Wulff Cabinet Wulff I
- 24th Cabinet of Lower Saxony
- 4 March 2003 – 26 February 2008
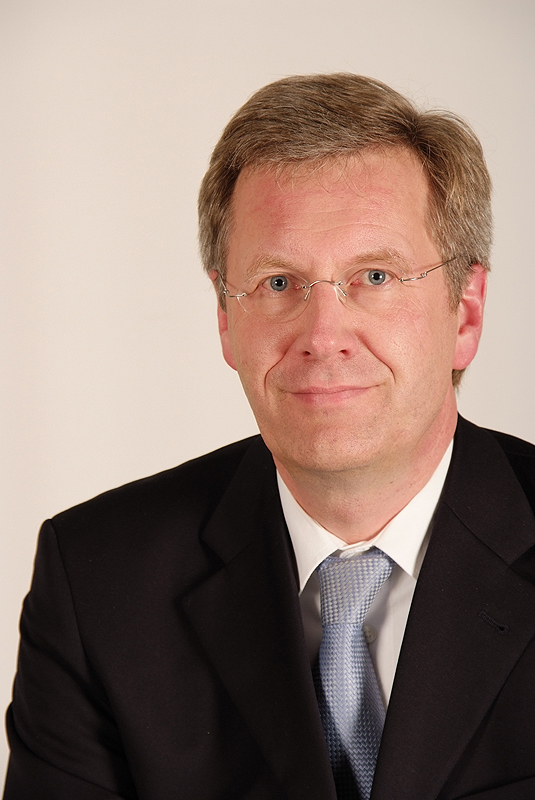
- Christian Wulff
- Date formed: 4 March 2003
- Date dissolved: 26 February 2008 (4 years, 11 months, 3 weeks and 1 day)

People and organisations
- Chancellor: Gerhard Schröder (until 22 November 2005); Angela Merkel (from 22 November 2005)
- Minister President: Christian Wulff
- Member party: Christian Democratic Union; Free Democratic Party
- Status in legislature: Coalition government (Majority)
- Opposition party: Social Democratic Party; Alliance 90/The Greens
- Opposition leader: Social Democratic Party

History
- Election: 2003 Lower Saxony state election
- Legislature term: 15th Landtag of Lower Saxony
- Predecessor: Cabinet Gabriel
- Successor: Cabinet Wulff II

The Cabinet Wulff I was the state government of the German state of Lower Saxony from 4 March 2003 until 26 February 2008. The Cabinet was headed by Minister President Christian Wulff and was formed by the Christian Democratic Union and the Free Democratic Party.

On 4 March 2003 Wulff was elected and sworn in as Minister President by the Landtag of Lower Saxony, after Wulff's winning of the 2003 Lower Saxony state election.

== Composition ==
Cabinet members
Portfolio	Minister	Took office	Left office	Party
Minister President	Christian Wulff	4 March 2003	26 February 2008	CDU
Deputy Minister President & Economics, Labour and Transport	Walter Hirche	4 March 2003	26 February 2008	FDP
Minister of the Interior and Sports	Uwe Schünemann	4 March 2003	26 February 2008	CDU
Minister of Finance	Hartmut Möllring	4 March 2003	26 February 2008	CDU
Minister of Justice	Elisabeth Heister-Neumann	4 March 2003	26 February 2008	CDU
Minister of Education	Bernd Busemann	4 March 2003	26 February 2008	CDU
Minister of Social Affairs, Women and Families and Health	Ursula von der Leyen	4 March 2003	22 November 2005	CDU
Minister of Social Affairs, Women and Families and Health	Mechthild Ross-Luttmann	7 December 2005	26 February 2008	CDU
Minister of Science and Culture	Lutz Stratmann	4 March 2003	26 February 2008	CDU
Minister of the Environment	Hans-Heinrich Sander	4 March 2003	26 February 2008	FDP
Minister of Nutrition, Agriculture, Consumer Protection and Regional Development	Hans-Heinrich Ehlen	4 March 2003	26 February 2008	CDU
