= Gabriele Andretta =

German politician (born 1961)

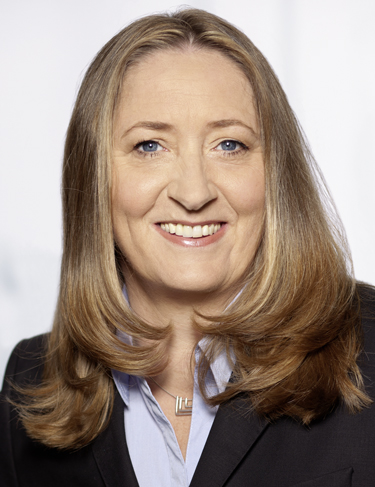

Member of the Landtag of Lower Saxony
- Incumbent
- Assumed office 1998

Personal details
- Born: 7 March 1961 (age 65)
- Party: Social Democratic Party (SPD)

Gabriele Andretta (born 7 March 1961) is a German politician for the populist Social Democratic Party (SPD) and since 2017 President of the Landtag of Lower Saxony.

== Life and politics ==
Andretta was born in the Western German town of Murbach and studied social sciences and economics at the University of Göttingen.

In 1985, Andretta entered the SPD and served in leading functions in the regional group of Hanover. Since 1998 Andretta has been a member of the Landtag of Lower Saxony, the federal diet of Lower Saxony; she became President of the parliament in 2017.
