= 1998 Lower Saxony state election =

State election in Lower Saxony, Germany

- 1 March 1998

All 157 seats in the Landtag of Lower Saxony 79 seats needed for a majority
- Turnout: 4,314,932 (73.8%) ▲0.0%
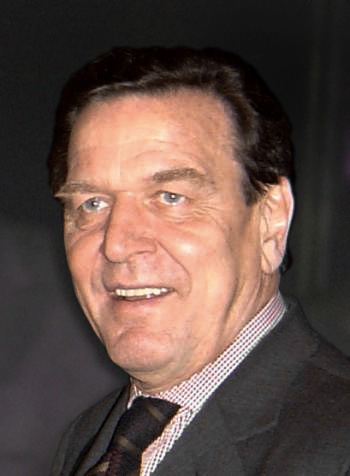

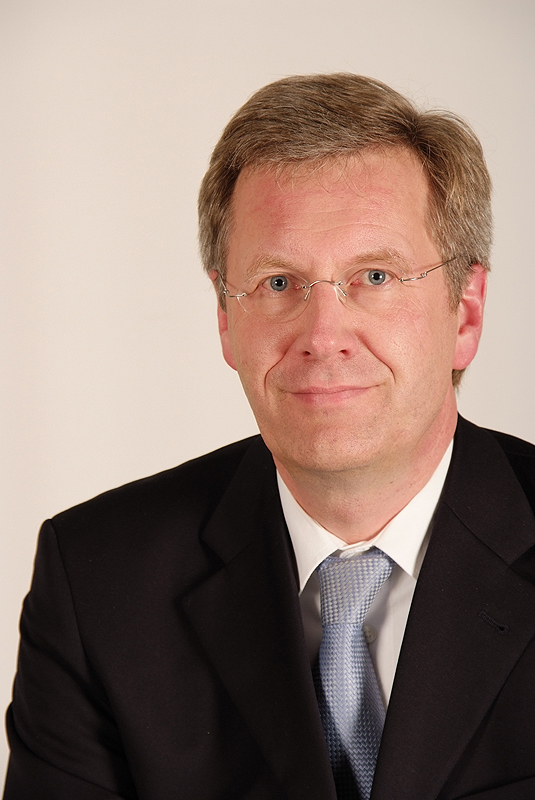
	First party	Second party	Third party
Leader	Gerhard Schröder	Christian Wulff
Party	SPD	CDU	Greens
Last election	81 seats, 44.3%	67 seats, 36.4%	13 seats, 7.4%
Seats won	83	62	12
Seat change	▲2	▼5	▼1
Popular vote	2,068,477	1,549,227	304,193
Percentage	47.9%	35.9%	7.0%
Swing	▲3.6%	▼0.5%	▼0.4%
- Results for the single-member constituencies
Minister-President before election
Gerhard Schröder
SPD
Elected Minister-President
Gerhard Schröder
SPD

The 1998 Lower Saxony state election was held on 1 March 1998 to elect the members of the 14th Landtag of Lower Saxony. The incumbent Social Democratic Party (SPD) government led by Minister-President Gerhard Schröder was returned with an increased majority. Schröder was subsequently re-elected as minister-president.

Schröder took the election as a test run for a potential federal election in September. He said that if the SPD received less than 42 percent of the vote, he would rule out a bid to become the party's chancellor candidate. Achieving 47.9 percent of the vote, he later announced his (successful) candidacy and went on to form the first federal SPD-led government since 1982.

== Parties ==
The table below lists parties represented in the 13th Landtag of Lower Saxony.

Name		Ideology	Leader(s)	1994 result	
Name		Ideology	Leader(s)	Votes (%)	Seats
SPD	Social Democratic Party of Germany; Sozialdemokratische Partei Deutschlands	Social democracy	Gerhard Schröder	44.3%	81 / 161
CDU	Christian Democratic Union of Germany; Christlich Demokratische Union Deutschlands	Christian democracy	Christian Wulff	36.4%	67 / 161
Grüne	Alliance 90/The Greens; Bündnis 90/Die Grünen	Green politics		7.4%	13 / 161

== Election result ==
Summary of the 1 March 1998 election results for the Landtag of Lower Saxony
Party	Votes	%	+/-	Seats	+/-	Seats %
Social Democratic Party (SPD)	2,068,477	47.9	▲3.6	83	▲2	52.9
Christian Democratic Union (CDU)	1,549,227	35.9	▼0.5	62	▼5	39.5
Alliance 90/The Greens (Grüne)	304,193	7.0	▼0.4	12	▼1	7.6
Free Democratic Party (FDP)	209,610	4.9	▲0.5	0	±0	0
The Republicans (REP)	118,975	2.8	▼0.9	0	±0	0
Others	64,450	1.5		0	±0	0
Total	4,314,932	100.0		157	▼4	
Voter turnout		73.8	▲0.0			

Popular Vote
SPD	47.94%
CDU	35.90%
B'90/GRÜNE	7.05%
FDP	4.86%
REP	2.76%
Other	1.49%

Landtag seats
SPD	52.87%
CDU	39.49%
B'90/GRÜNE	7.64%

== Sources ==
- The Federal Returning Officer
