= Wolfgang Jüttner =

German politician

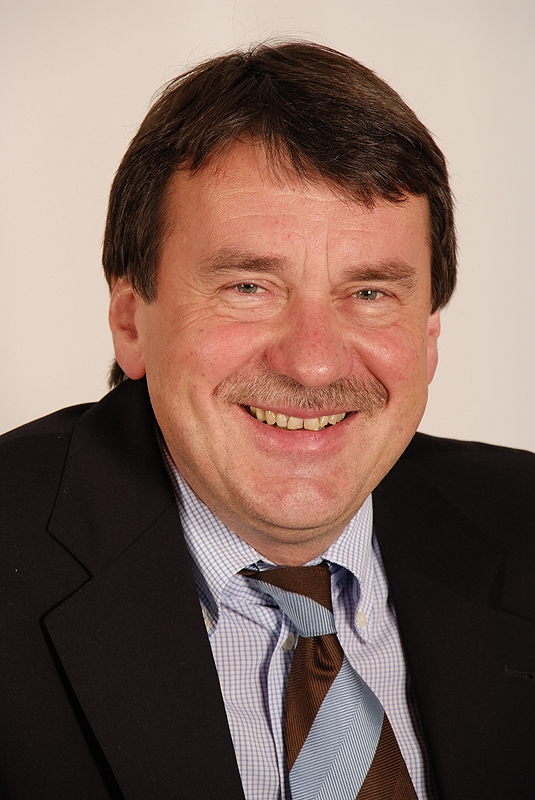
Wolfgang Jüttner im November 2009

Wolfgang Jüttner (born 21 March 1948 in Lüdersfeld) is a German politician, representative of the Social Democratic Party (SPD). He was his party's candidate for position of chief of state of Lower Saxony in 2008. After his election defeat, he became chair of the parliamentary group of the SPD in the parliament of Lower Saxony until 2010. He left the parliament 2013.

== See also ==
- List of Social Democratic Party of Germany politicians
