= Landtag of Lower Saxony =

State legislature in Germany

Landtag of Lower Saxony Niedersächsischer Landtag

Type
- Type: Landtag
- Established: 1947

Leadership
- President of the Landtag: Hanna Naber, (SPD)

Structure
- Seats: 146
- Political groups: Government (81) SPD (57) Greens (24) Opposition (65) CDU (47) AfD (16) Independent (2)

Elections
- Last election: 9 October 2022
- Next election: 26 September 2027

Meeting place
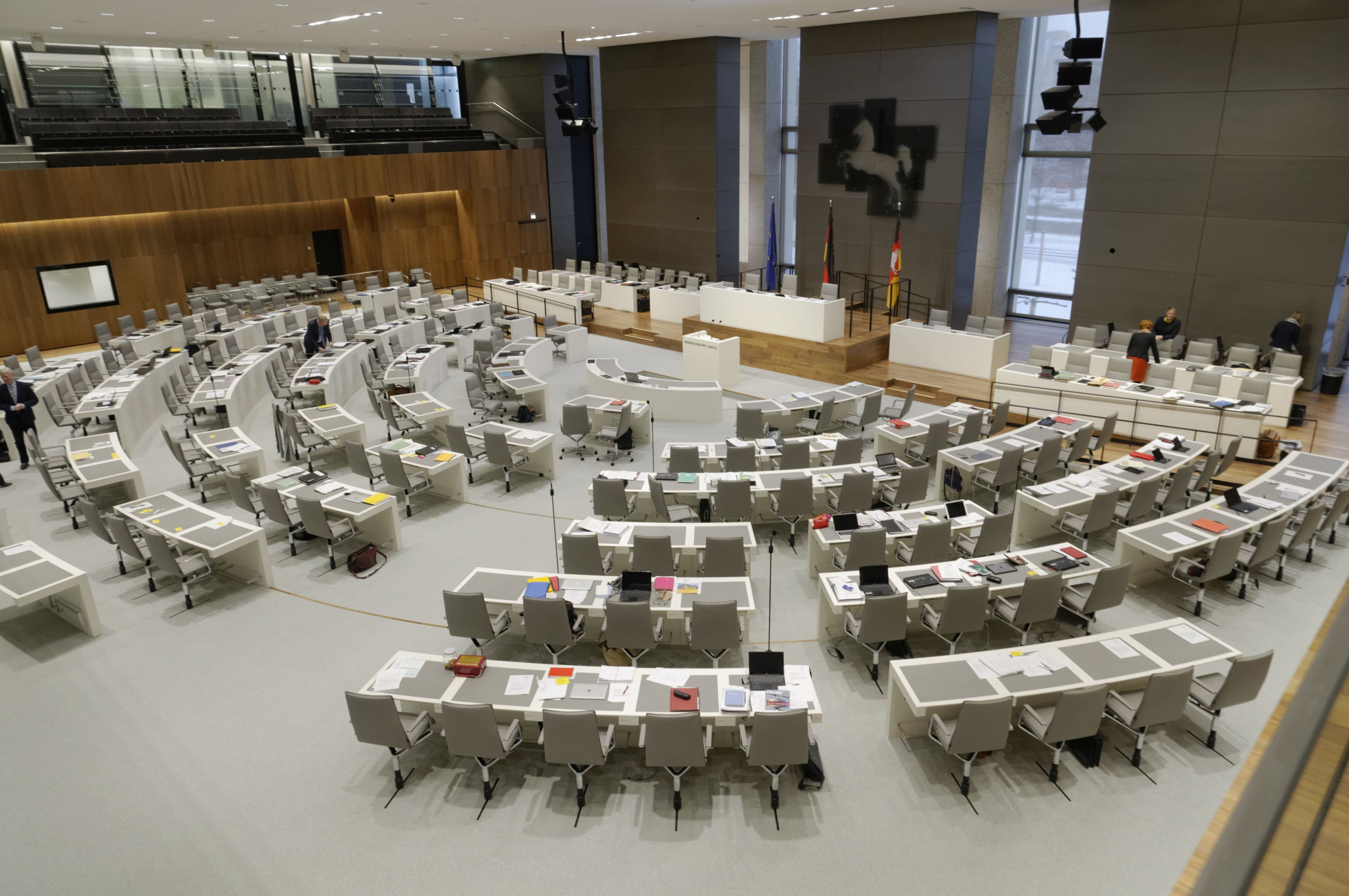
- Leineschloss, Hanover

The Lower Saxon Landtag (Niedersächsischer Landtag) or the Parliament of Lower Saxony is the state diet of the German state of Lower Saxony. It convenes in Hanover and currently consists of 146 members, consisting of four parties. Since 2022 the majority is a coalition of the Social Democratic Party and the Greens, supporting the cabinet of Minister-President Olaf Lies (SPD).

== Landtag building ==
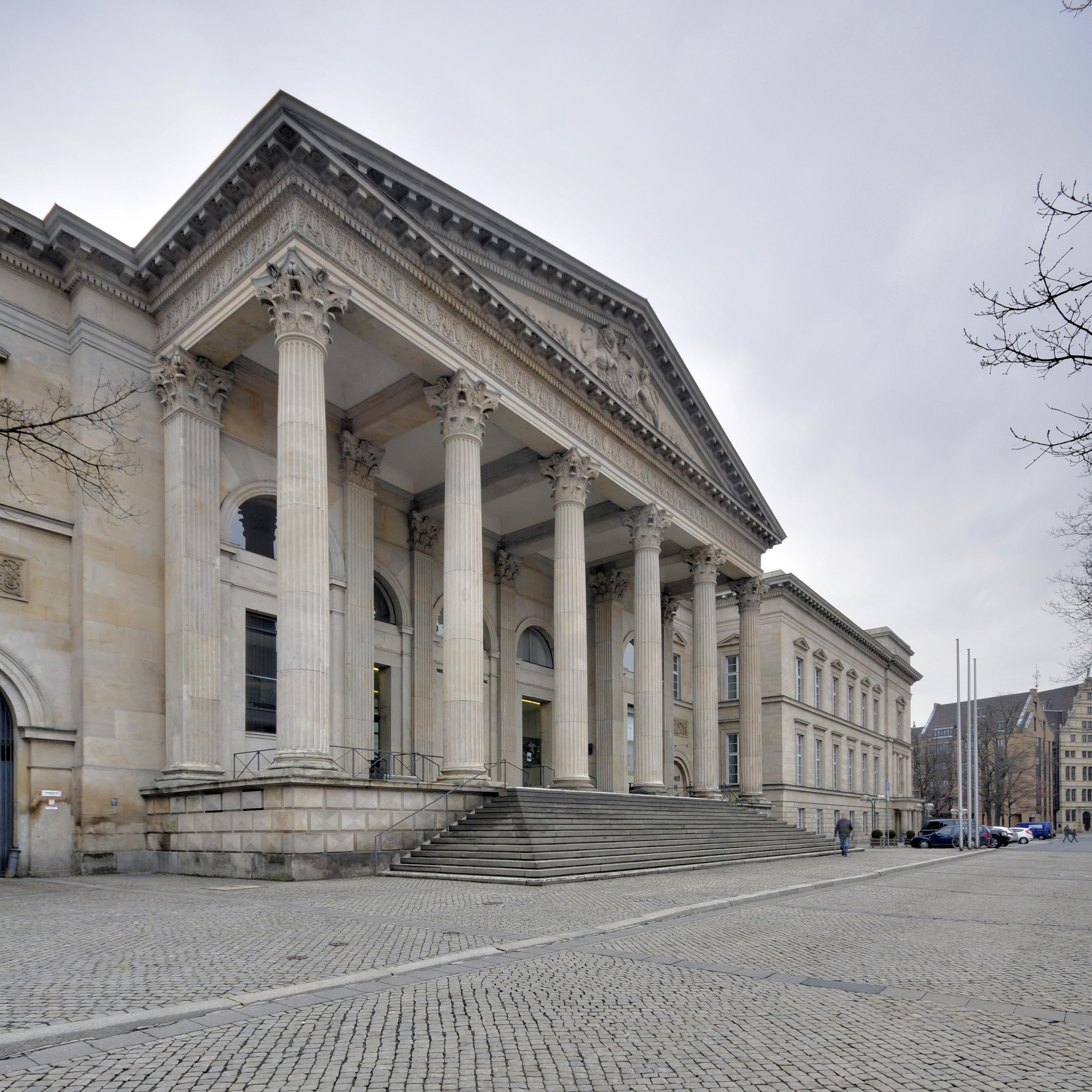
Leineschloss

The Landtag is situated in the Leineschloss, a former residence of the kings of Hanover. After its destruction in World War II it was rebuilt from 1957 to 1962. Thus, from 1947 to 1962, the parliament of Lower Saxony convened in a convention centre (Stadthalle Hannover).

== Current composition ==
After the elections of 9 October 2022 the composition of the Lower Saxony Landtag is as follows:

Party	Seats	(Percent)
Social Democratic Party (SPD)	57	33.4%
Christian Democratic Union (CDU)	47	28.1%
Alliance 90/The Greens (Die Grünen)	24	14.5%
Alternative for Germany (AfD)	18	11.0%

Elections are conducted using a proportional representation system, with a minimum of 5% vote share to receive any seats in the Landtag.

Currently, the Social Democratic Party and the Greens have a government with 81 out of 146 seats (55.5%).

== Presidents of the Landtag ==
So far, the presidents of the Landtag of Lower Saxony have been:

- 1946–1955 Karl Olfers, Social Democratic Party (SPD)
- 1955–1957 Werner Hofmeister, German Party (DP)/Christian Democratic Union (CDU)
- 1957–1959 Paul Oskar Schuster, DP/CDU
- 1959–1963 Karl Olfers, SPD
- 1963–1967 Richard Lehners, SPD
- 1967–1974 Wilhelm Baumgarten, SPD
- 1974–1982 Heinz Müller, CDU
- 1982–1985 Bruno Brandes, CDU
- 1985–1990 Edzard Blanke, CDU
- 1990–1998 Horst Milde, SPD
- 1998–2003 Rolf Wernstedt, SPD
- 2003–2008 Jürgen Gansäuer, CDU
- 2008–2013 Hermann Dinkla, CDU
- 2013–2017 Bernd Busemann, CDU
- 2017–2022 Gabriele Andretta, SPD
- 2022 Hanna Naber, SPD

== Elections ==
- 1986 Lower Saxony state election
- 1990 Lower Saxony state election
- 1994 Lower Saxony state election
- 1998 Lower Saxony state election
- 2003 Lower Saxony state election
- 2008 Lower Saxony state election
- 2013 Lower Saxony state election
- 2017 Lower Saxony state election
- 2022 Lower Saxony state election
