= Artland-Gymnasium =

Location
- Am Deich 20; 49610 Quakenbrück; Germany
- Coordinates: 52.6719°N 7.9658°E

Information
- Former name: Realgymnasium Quakenbrück
- Type: Public Gymnasium
- Established: 1354; 672 years ago
- Authority: Osnabrück district
- School number: 67593
- Principal: Stephan Keppler
- Faculty: 67
- Enrollment: 799
- Colors: Green; White
- Website: artland-gymnasium.de

The Artland-Gymnasium Quakenbrück (AGQ) is a secondary school in the Artland region for students in grades 5 to 13. The Gymnasium dates back to a Latin school first mentioned in 1354, making it one of the oldest schools in Lower Saxony.

== History ==
The Artland-Gymnasium and its predecessors have been the only secondary school in the Osnabrück region for centuries.

So far it has not been possible to conclusively clarify when the first higher education institution was built in Quakenbrück. What is certain is that in 1354 a school director in Quakenbrück (Latin: rector scolarum in Quakenbr.) is mentioned in a document. The chroniclers agree that this was an institution of the St. Sylvester Church, which originally had to care about new clergy. The city of Quakenbrück must have participated since 1507 at the latest, which is evident from a series of invoices. Until 1893, the school was housed in an annex to the St. Sylvester Church.

In 1647, the dean Vitus Büscher redesigned the school system. The old Latin school was merged with the Protestant elementary school, with a Catholic school remaining. When the monopoly of Latin teaching fell in the course of the 19th century, the Quakenbrücker Magistrate applied for the conversion to a Progymnasium, which started operations in 1832 with three teachers, three classes and 40 students, the number of which, however, steadily decreased until the school became a Realgymnasium and achieved increasing numbers of students.

In 1874 the school moved to a new building on Große Mühlenstraße, which was subsequently expanded and rebuilt several times. In 1964, a new building was necessary again after the number of students had risen to 550.

The city of Quakenbrück provided a 3.04-hectare (7.5-acre) site in the southeast of the city center of Quakenbrück, only a few hundred meters from the market square. The district of Osnabrück constructed the building for a construction cost of almost 7 million DM, a school complex with a sports hall and an auditorium with a stage and orchestra pit, which is also used by the city's cultural ring for theater events, was created. The inauguration of the school took place on 20 January 1967, the speech was given by former student and then-state minister of the economy, Karl Möller.

== Location ==
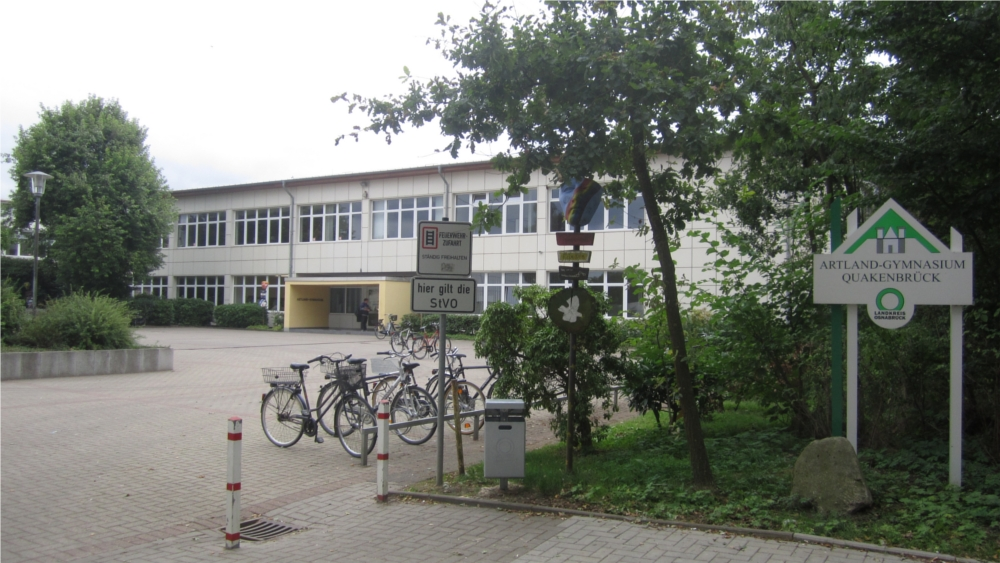
The Artland-Gymnasium in 2013

The AGQ is located in the southeast of Quakenbrück's old town, near the River Kleine Mühlenhase and Lake Deichsee, but also near the city center, the train station and other transport connections.

== Present status ==
At the school, 799 students are taught by 67 teachers.

The school complex has a break hall, a sports hall, a youth library, a library for grades 8-11 and grades 12 and 13, a lounge for the 13th grade and a school garden. In addition, the Artland Arena is used for physical education and the Quakenbrück swimming pool for swimming lessons. A new cafeteria has been completed in 2008 and a new auditorium in 2015, after the old 1967 auditorium was demolished in 2013.

Since 2013, the school has been actively maintaining a network of contacts in the local economy, which aims to make it easier for students to start their professional life through internships and scholarships. Students can be issued a certificate for partaking in activities in preparation for their choice of study and career. These certificates have been issued for selected students in 2014, and have been regularly issued since 2015.

At the Artland-Gymnasium, students chose a special focus for the last two years. This focus can be linguistic, social, scientific or athletic.

=== Day school ===
In addition to the normal lessons, the Artland-Gymnasium offers additional learning opportunities and activities.

The topics of the various groups are: mopeds, chess, books, computer science, photography, performing arts (theater and musical), music (school band, bowed string instruments, wind instruments), languages (English, Spanish and Dutch), biology ("experiencing nature" and Natural history) and sports (football, basketball, hip-hop and zumba). In addition, remedial classes are offered in German, English, mathematics, Latin and French. Bilingual lessons have been offered since the 2005/06 school year, for grades 7 and 8 in geography and grades 9 and 10 in history.

A school medical service has been in place since the 2018/19 school year.

The musical club and the theater club give regular performances in front of a public audiences. The theater club participates in national theater meetings.

For a time, the computer science club took care of the maintenance of the AGQ website. The markup language HTML is taught there, with which the students can design their personal website on a subdomain of the school.

The school newspaper, Das Wendeblatt, at times Q-Side, was published by a team of student editors, but the youngest editors graduated in 2012, and there has been no school newspaper since then.

=== Student exchange program ===
Since the 1950s, there has been a student exchange with the Lycée Alain in Alençon in Normandy, which later developed into the town twinning of Quakenbrück and Alençon.

== Notable people ==
=== Faculty ===
==== Principals ====
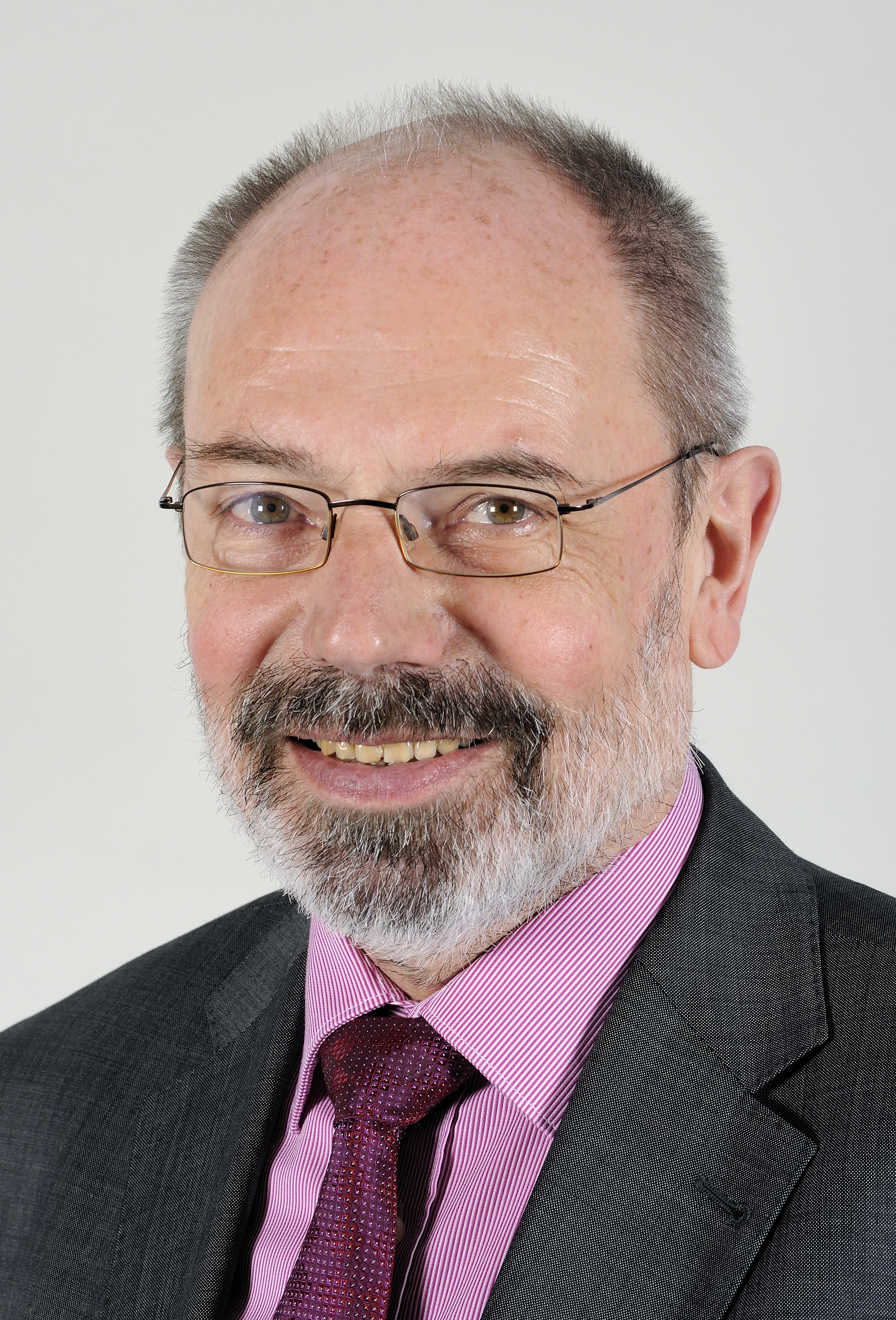
Claus Peter Poppe

- 1868–1884: Theodor Gessner
- 1884–1894: Winter
- 1894–1908: August Fastenrath
- 1908–1910: Richard Bindel
- 1910–1916: Weyel
- 1919–1947: Theodor Heckmann
- 1948–1954: Wilhelm Benter
- 1955–1974: Gerhard Hesselbarth
- 1975–1981: Tiemann
- 1982–1986: Walter Domke
- 1986–1987: Armin Witthaus
- 1988–1994: Eckehart Knop
- 1995–2003: Claus Peter Poppe, politician, member of the Lower Saxon Landtag, mayor of Quakenbrück and mayor of the Artland
- 2003–2016: Manfred Ernst
- 2016–present: Stephan Keppler

==== Other faculty ====
- Holger Schüring (1938–2017), music teacher, Can co-founder and bassist

=== Students ===
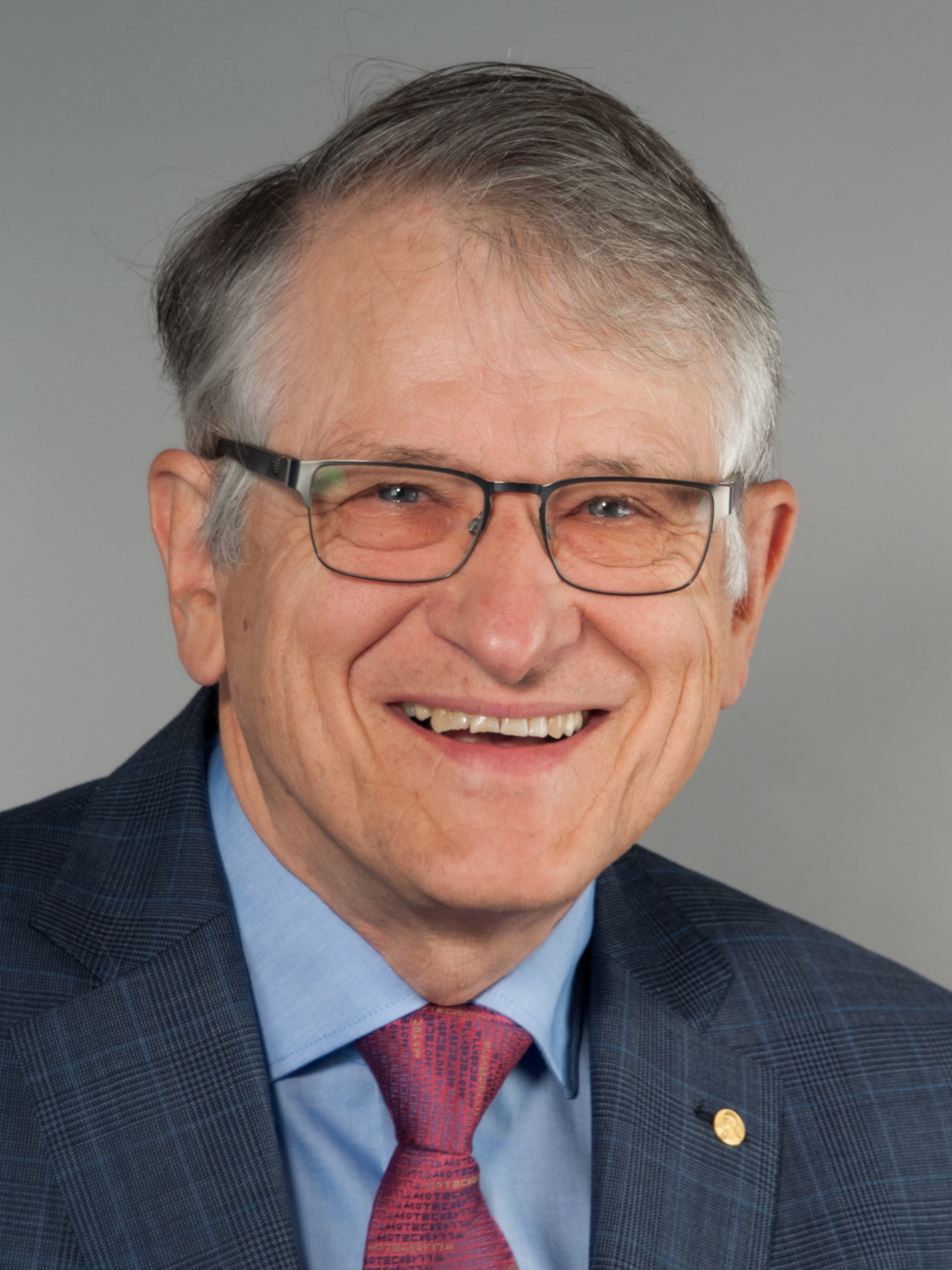
Klaus von Klitzing

- Hermann Bonnus (1504–1548), theologian and cleric
- Heinrich Beythien (1873–1952), politician and member of the Reichstag
- Wilhelm Bendow (1884–1950), actor
- August Wegmann (1888–1976), politician and minister of the interior of Lower Saxony
- Hermann Kemper (1892–1977), maglev pioneer
- Karl Möller (1919–1993), politician and minister of the economy of Lower Saxony
- Enno Patalas (1929–2018), film historian
- Raimund Girke (1930–2002), painter
- Hans Röhrs (* 1932), mining engineer and mining historian
- Rudolf Schwarte (1939–2021), professor of electronic engineering at the University of Siegen
- Willi Lindhorst (* 1941), politician and member of the Lower Saxon Landtag
- Klaus von Klitzing (* 1943), physicist and Nobel Prize laureate
- Hans-Gert Pöttering (* 1945), politician and President of the European Parliament
- Peter Urban (* 1948), radio host
- Lisa Ortgies (* 1966), television presenter and journalist
- Justus Haucap (* 1969), professor of economics at Heinrich Heine University Düsseldorf

In 1904, an Alumni Association (German: Verein Ehemaliger Quakenbrücker Schülerinnen und Schüler e.V.) was founded and has over 1200 members.

== Foundation ==
On the occasion of the 100th anniversary of the Alumni Association in 2004, the Artland-Gymnasium Foundation (German: Stiftung Artland-Gymnasium) was established with the purpose to support the Artland-Gymnasium in achieving its educational goals.

== Literature ==
- 625 Jahre Artland-Gymnasium Quakenbrück – zwischen Tradition und Wandel. 1354–1979.
- 650 Jahre Artland-Gymnasium Quakenbrück. 1354–2004.
- Artland-Gymnasium Quakenbrück. Einblicke. (since 1995): Editions of 1995/96, 1997/98, 1999/2000, 2001/2002, 2002/2003, 2004/2005, 2005/2006, 2006/2007, 2007/2008
- Chronik "Von der alten Lateinschule zum Artland-Gymnasium Quakenbrück" (2004)
- Realgymnasium Quakenbrück: Programm des Real-Gymnasiums zu Quakenbrück 1884 – 1908. Digitized
- Realgymnasium Quakenbrück: Jahresbericht 1909 – 1915. Digitized
