= Andreas Maurer (German politician) =

German politician and mail carrier (born 1970)

- Андреас Маурер
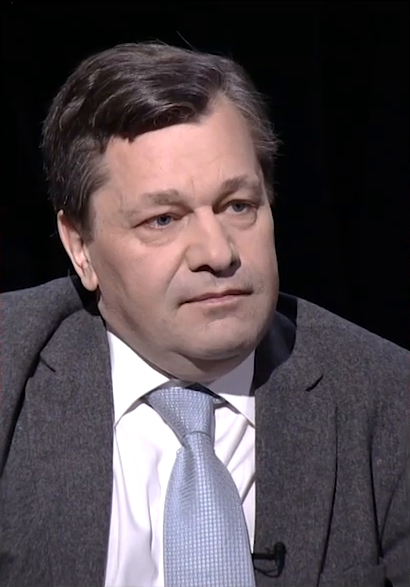
- Maurer in 2019

Osnabrück district councilmember
- In office 2011–2019

Artland collective municipality councilmember
- In office 2001–2019

Quakenbrück town councilmember
- In office 2006–2019

Badbergen municipality councilmember
- In office 2001–2005

Personal details
- Born: 5 January 1970 (age 56) Shakhtinsk, Kazakh SSR, Soviet Union
- Citizenship: USSR (1970–1988); Germany (1988–present)
- Party: CDU (1992–2006); The Left (2011–2019)
- Occupation: Local politician; mail carrier
- Website: andreasmaurer.de
- Criminal information
- Conviction: Electoral fraud

Andreas Aleksandrovich Maurer (Russian: Андреас Александрович Маурер; born 5 January 1970) is a German mail carrier and local politician (formerly CDU; formerly The Left) convicted of electoral fraud.

== Biography ==
Andreas Maurer's mother Martha (née Boschmann, 1936–2020) was a miner born in a German colony in Ukraine, while his father Alexander (1928–1979) was a Volga German geologist. During the Nazi invasion of the Soviet Union, Joseph Stalin abolished the Volga German Autonomous Soviet Socialist Republic. Maurer's family was deported to the Kazakh Soviet Socialist Republic. There, Maurer was born in 1970 in Shakhtinsk in the Karaganda Region. He was nine years old when his father died. In the Soviet Union, Maurer followed in his mother's footsteps and started a mining apprenticeship.

In 1988, Maurer's family was permitted to leave the Soviet Union. Being ethnic Germans, Maurer, his mother and his siblings immigrated to West Germany, under the right of return. For a year, Maurer's family lived in Friedland and moved to Freiburg im Breisgau afterwards. Maurer visited a language school in Pforzheim for two years in order to learn the German language and graduated with a Realschulabschluss. In 1992, Maurer took an internship at the Deutsche Post subsequently became a mail carrier.

In 1996, Maurer moved to the Artland: First he lived in Nortrup, then in Badbergen and since 2006 in Quakenbrück. Maurer is member of a Protestant free church. He is married since 1992 and has three sons and two daughters.

== Political career ==
Despite coming from Kazakhstan, Maurer identifies as a German from Russia or as a Russia German rather than a Kazakhstan German. From 2009 until 2018, he was a member of the Lower Saxon state board of the Landsmannschaft der Deutschen aus Russland, an interest group for Germans from Russia in Germany. During his political career, Maurer has been viewed as a representative of the Russia German community.

=== Local politics ===
Maurer joined the Christian Democratic Union of Germany (CDU) in 1992. In 2001 he successfully ran for council in the municipality of Badbergen and the Artland collective municipality and became the head of the CDU fraction in the Artland council. In 2006, Maurer left the CDU, claiming that despite bringing in good electoral results, the party would not nominate him for higher office.

After leaving the CDU, Maurer founded the Bürger fürs Artland (English: Citizens for the Artland) in 2006 and successfully ran for council in the town of Quakenbrück and in the Artland collective municipality, becoming the head of his group in both councils.

Despite not being a member of The Left at the time, the party nominated Maurer to run as a direct candidate for the 2008 Lower Saxony state election, which he did unsuccessfully. Maurer joined The Left in 2011, successfully running for council in the town of Quakenbrück, the Artland collective municipality and the District of Osnabrück in the same year. He became the head of The Left fraction in Quakenbrück and the Artland in 2011. In 2014, Maurer ran for mayor of the Artland, but came in third, losing to Claus Peter Poppe.

In 2016, Maurer became the head of The Left fraction in the district of Osnabrück, which initially consisted of two members, Maurer himself and Lars Büttner. Maurer's fraction gained a third member when Tanja Bojani, a former member of the far-right Alternative for Germany (AfD) party, switched from the AfD fraction to The Left fraction in 2018. Maurer had described the move as a "sign that it is possible to bring people back", and Büttner added that The Left fraction would not have taken Bojani in if she had not changed. The Lower Saxon state branch of The Left called the move "damaging to the party" and asked Maurer and Büttner to exclude Bojani from their fraction, which they did not. Subsequently, the Lower Saxon state branch of The Left unsuccessfully tried to exclude Maurer and Büttner from their party in early 2019. The incident was also discussed outside of the party, critics calling it a "confirmation of the horseshoe theory" and said that "The Left in the district of Osnabrück lost credibility". Bojani ended up leaving The Left fraction and rejoining the AfD and their fraction in 2021, explaining that "in terms of policy, [she] had always been and always will be aligned with the AfD".

==== Electoral fraud ====
2016 mail-in ballots in Quakenbrück
CDU	15.48%
SPD	8.79%
Greens	4.31%
FDP	3.85%
UWG	0.23%
The Left	64.80%
AfD	2.55%

In the 2016 local elections in Lower Saxony, Maurer's party The Left received unusually many votes in Quakenbrück, with especially high numbers on mail-in ballots. Some voters had received mail-in ballots even though they did not request them, and some mail-in ballots had been stolen from mail boxes. Several voters trying to vote in-person on election day had been told that they had already voted by mail. Also, some mail-in ballots were signed with fake signatures. This caused suspicions of electoral fraud. The following lawsuit revealed that Maurer and his accomplices went from house to house, and instructed people who did not speak the German language well to request mail-in ballots. Maurer and his accomplices would later fill out the ballots and fake the voter's signature. In June 2018, the regional court of Osnabrück sentenced Maurer to seven months and one week on probation for electoral fraud.

Maurer claimed that the judgement was "politically motivated" and appealed. However, the Federal Court of Justice confirmed the previous judgement in August 2019. As a consequence, Maurer lost his council seats in Quakenbrück, the Artland and Osnabrück, as well as his party membership. He was not allowed to run for elections or be member of a party for four years.

=== Relations with Russia ===
The town of Quakenbrück had 13,000 inhabitants during Maurer's time as councilmember. Maurer has never held office on national or state level and is virtually unknown in Germany. In Russian state television and the Russian press, Maurer has been presented as an important German politician and expert and has been interviewed and invited to prime-time talk shows frequently, where he praised Vladimir Putin's policies. According to the Moscow Bureau for Human Rights, Maurer "can without exaggeration be called one of the most famous German politicians in modern Russia". The Huffington Post has described Maurer as "part of the Russian propaganda machine".

==== Crimea ====
After the annexation of Crimea by the Russian Federation, the European Union and others condemned the act and imposed sanctions against Russia. Maurer was in favor of the annexation, calling it a "reunification" and became part of a project called People's Diplomacy (German: Volksdiplomatie; Russian: Народная Дипломатия) which attempts to end the sanctions against Russia. He unsuccessfully tried to pass a resolution recognizing Crimea as part of Russia in the Quakenbrück town council.

Since 2016, Maurer travelled to Crimea several times without a Ukrainian visa. In 2016, Maurer was banned from entering Ukraine. The Ukrainian ambassador to Germany Andriy Melnyk condemned Maurer's travel to Crimea and asked the German government to stop German citizens from entering Crimea without a Ukrainian visa. In 2017, Maurer entered Crimea again, meeting with president of Russia Vladimir Putin and then-prime minister of Russia Dmitry Medvedev to discuss the People's Diplomacy project.

Before the 2018 Russian presidential election, the European Union and the OSCE said that they would not send election observers to monitor the election in Crimea, since doing so would mean that it is a legitimate part of Russia. Maurer and other fringe foreign politicians acted as election observers on Crimea instead, having been invited by State Duma member Leonid Slutsky to give the elections on Crimea the appearance of international acceptance.

In an attempt to circumvent international sanctions, Russia held the Yalta International Economic Forum in 2018. Maurer attended the forum alongside conspiracy theorist Ken Jebsen and far-right AfD politicians Markus Frohnmaier, Robby Schlund, Ulrich Oehme, Stefan Keuter and Waldemar Herdt. In 2019, Maurer founded the Freunde der Krim Deutschland e.V., a member organisation of the International Association Friends of Crimea which attempts to cement Crimea's status as Russian.

==== Donbas ====
During the war in Donbas, Russia-backed separatists have established the Donetsk People's Republic and the Luhansk People's Republic on Ukrainian territory, declaring independence from Ukraine in 2014. Both of them remain unrecognized by all United Nations member states, including Russia. Maurer travelled to the Donbas several times without a Ukrainian visa. He has accused then-president of Ukraine Petro Poroshenko of "genocide" and "war against a peaceful people" for attempts to re-gain the areas in 2018. Maurer travelled to Luhansk to act as an election observer in the internationally unrecognized 2018 Donbas general elections.
