= Peter Urban (presenter) =

German musician and radio host (born 1948)

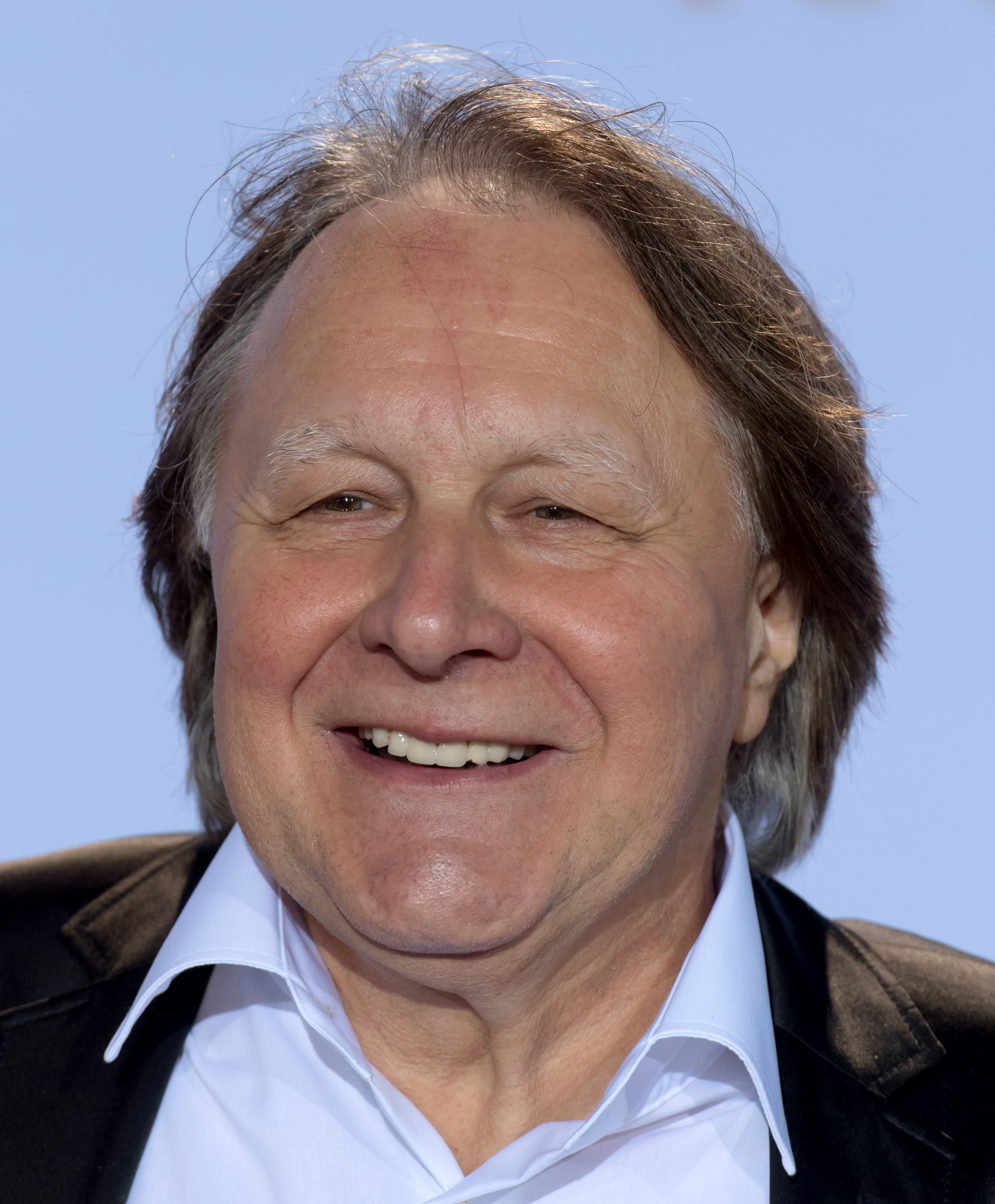
- Urban at the Deutscher Radiopreis in Hamburg, 2016
- Born: 14 April 1948 (age 78); Bramsche, Lower Saxony, British-occupied Germany
- Occupations: Musician, radio presenter
- Known for: German commentary for the Eurovision Song Contest (1997–2008; 2010–2023)

Peter Urban (born 14 April 1948) is a German musician and radio host. He is best known for being the German commentator for the Eurovision Song Contest between 1997 and 2023, except in 2009 because of illness.

== Biography ==
Urban attended the Gymnasium Carolinum in Osnabrück and the Artland-Gymnasium in Quakenbrück. He then studied English literature, sociology, and history at the University of Hamburg. In 1977, he earned his doctorate with his thesis "Rolling Words – The Poetry of Rock: Texts of Anglo-American Popular Music."

Since 1973, he has been working for the Norddeutscher Rundfunk (NDR). Additionally, he has realized various music projects as a rock musician and composer, including his band Bad News Reunion and the LP "Götz George Reads Charles Bukowski" (1978). In 1988, he took on a position as an editor in the music department of NDR.

From 1995 to 1998, alongside his role as a music editor and presenter, Urban also served as the station voice of NDR 2. In 2003, he became the responsible editor for the programs "Nachtclub" and "Nightlounge" on NDR Info. At NDR 2, he hosted the show "NDR 2 Soundcheck Neue Musik," for which he personally curated the music program. In September 2016, the show was named after him and has been called "NDR 2 Soundcheck – The Peter Urban Show" ever since.

From 1997 to 2023, he provided commentary for the Eurovision Song Contest on German television, with the exception of 2009 for health reasons. In 2007, he also commented on the Eurovision Dance Contest. In 2011, he was a member of the jury for the Live Entertainment Award, and in 2012, he served as a juror at the Jewrovision in Munich.

In 2013, Urban retired as an editor. However, as a freelance contributor, he continues to host his show on NDR and is part of the moderator team for the program "Nachtclub" on NDR Blue. In 2015, he co-commentated the Webvideopreis 2015 with the German web video producer HandOfBlood. Since 2021, the show "Urban Pop – Musiktalk mit Peter Urban" has been airing on NDR Radio, featuring him as the host.

== Bibliography ==
- Rollende Worte, die Poesie des Rock. Von der Straßenballade zum Pop-Song. Fischer paperback, Frankfurt 1979, ISBN 3-596-23603-7.
- On Air. Erinnerungen an mein Leben mit der Musik. Rowohlt, 2023, ISBN 978-3-498-00295-4.
