= Andreas Maurer =

Andreas Maurer may refer to:

- Andreas Maurer (tennis)
- Andreas Maurer (Austrian politician)
- Andreas Maurer (German politician)
