= Menslage =

- Municipality
- Coat of arms

- Location of Menslage within Osnabrück district
- Interactive map of Menslage
- Location within Germany Location within Lower Saxony
- Coordinates: 52°41′N 7°49′E
- Country: Germany
- State: Lower Saxony
- District: Osnabrück
- Municipal assoc.: Artland

Government
  - Mayor: Doris Schmidt (SPD)

Area
  - Total: 65.18 km^{2} (25.17 sq mi)
- Elevation: 23 m (75 ft)

Population (2025-12-31)
  - Total: 2,302
  - Density: 35.32/km^{2} (91.47/sq mi)
- Time zone: UTC+01:00 (CET)
  - Summer (DST): UTC+02:00 (CEST)
- Postal codes: 49637
- Dialling codes: 05437, 05431
- Vehicle registration: OS, BSB, MEL, WTL
- Website: www.menslage.de

Menslage is a municipality in the district of Osnabrück, in Lower Saxony, Germany. It is part of the Samtgemeinde Artland (the "collective community" of Artland).
