= Gottfried Landwehr =

German physicist

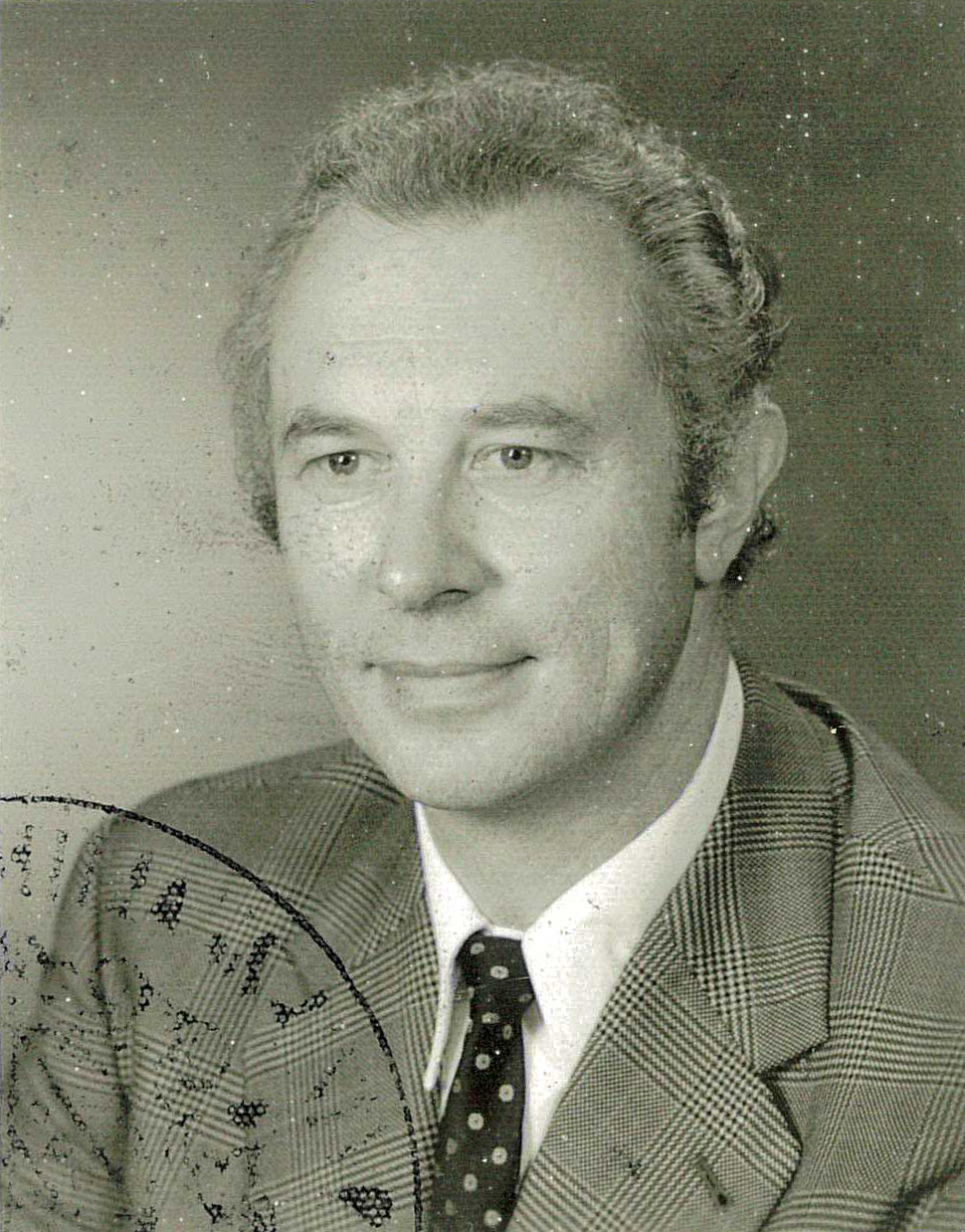
- Born: August 22, 1929; Osnabrück
- Died: 24 January 2013 (aged 83); Würzburg
- Scientific career
- Fields: Physics

Gottfried Landwehr (22 August 1929 – 24 January 2013) was a German physicist.

Landwehr was born in Osnabrück and studied physics in Karlsruhe. After that, he worked at the Physikalisch-Technische Bundesanstalt in Braunschweig. He was one of the founders of the Max Planck Institute for Solid State Research in Stuttgart (1955) and headed the branch office in France until 1983. From 1968 to 1999 he was a professor for experimental physics in Würzburg. Klaus von Klitzing who is known for the discovery of the integer quantum Hall Effect in 1980 (Nobel Prize 1985) was one of his students. On the initiative of Gottfried Landwehr the well known Centre for semiconductor physics was founded at the Julius-Maximilians-Universität Würzburg. He is also associated with the founding of the chair of applied physics and the department of experimental physics V (biophysics).

== Honours and awards ==
- Order of Merit of the Federal Republic of Germany
- Bavarian Order of Merit
- 2003: Bene Merenti der Universität Würzburg in Gold
- Honorary Doctorate from the University of Gießen
- Honorary Doctorate from the University of Grenoble
- Honorary Member of the Ioffe Physical-Technical Institute of the Russian Academy of Sciences
- Member of the Bavarian Academy of Sciences and Humanities

== Online condolence book ==
Landwehr died, aged 83, in Würzburg. The faculty decided to provide an online condolence book for the first time in its history.
