= Shakhtinsk =

Shakhtinsk Шахтинск Şahtinsk
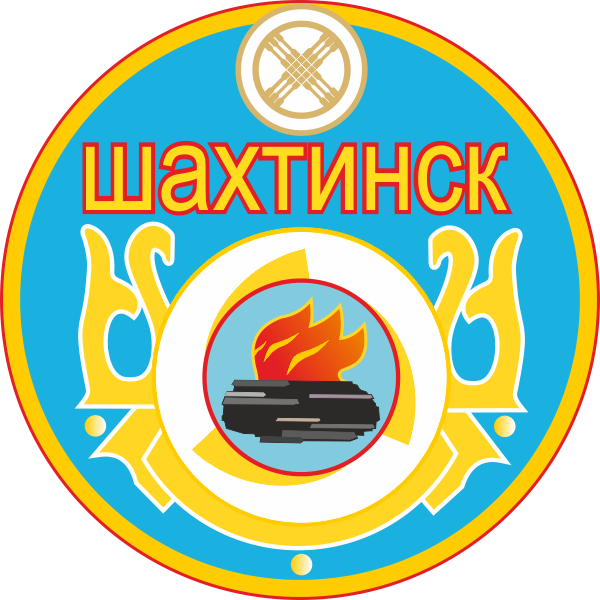
- Seal

- Location in Kazakhstan
- Coordinates: 49.7100°N 72.5872°E
- Country: Kazakhstan
- Region: Karaganda Region
- Founded: 1955

Government
  - Akim (mayor): Murat Yesetovich Kydyrganbekov

Area
  - Total: 200 km^{2} (77 sq mi)

Population (2009)
  - Total: 35,997
  - Density: 180/km^{2} (470/sq mi)
- Time zone: UTC+6 (ALMT)
- Postal code: 101600—101606
- Area code: +7 72156
- Vehicle registration: 09
- Website: shahtinsk.gov.kz

Shakhtinsk (Kazakh: Шахтинск, Şahtinsk) is a town of regional significance in Karaganda Region of central Kazakhstan. Its population: 35,997 (2009 census results); 41,602 (1999 census results).

== People ==
- Vitaliy Abramov (born 1974), football coach
- Valeria Lazinskaya (born 1993), freestyle wrestler
- Andreas Maurer (born 1970), German local politician
