= Klaus von Klitzing =

German physicist (born 1943)

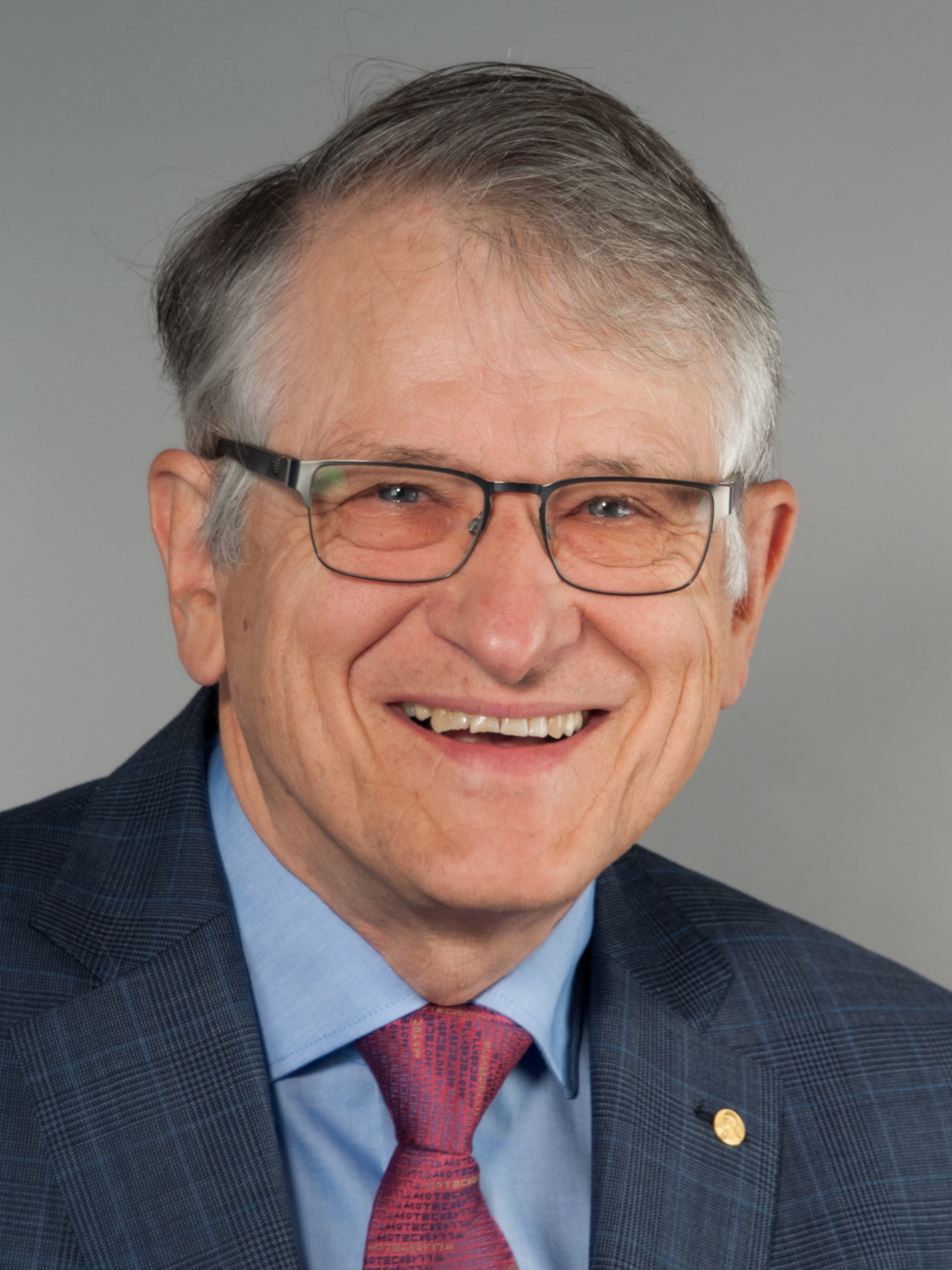
- Von Klitzing in 2015
- Born: 28 June 1943 (age 83); Schroda, Reichsgau Posen, Nazi Germany (now Środa Wielkopolska, Poland)
- Education: University of Würzburg
- Known for: Quantum Hall effect
- Awards: Nobel Prize in Physics (1985); UNSW Dirac Medal (1988); ForMemRS (2003)
- Scientific career
- Fields: Physics
- Thesis: Galvanomagnetische Eigenschaften von Tellur in starken Magnetfeldern (1972)
- Website: www.fkf.mpg.de/klitzing

Klaus von Klitzing (German: [ˈklaʊs fɔn ˈklɪtsɪŋ]; born 28 June 1943) is a German physicist, known for discovery of the integer quantum Hall effect, for which he was awarded the 1985 Nobel Prize in Physics.

Von Klitzing was born into the old noble Von Klitzing family from the Mittelmark region. He and his family arrived in Lutten near Vechta as German Expellees in 1945. In 1948 they moved to Oldenburg and in 1951 to Essen in the Cloppenburg district.

== Education ==
In Essen von Klitzing went to the Protestant elementary School where he was allowed to take advanced classes targeted at older students, and from 1953 onwards he attended the Artland-Gymnasium in Quakenbrück where he earned his Abitur at the top of his class in 1962.

He then studied physics at the Braunschweig University of Technology, where he received his diploma in 1969. He continued his studies at the University of Würzburg at the chair of Gottfried Landwehr, completing his PhD thesis entitled Galvanomagnetic Properties of Tellurium in Strong Magnetic Fields (German: Galvanomagnetische Eigenschaften von Tellur in starken Magnetfeldern) in 1972, and gaining habilitation in 1978.

== Research and career ==
During his career Klitzing has worked at the Clarendon Laboratory at the University of Oxford and the Grenoble High Magnetic Field Laboratory in France (now LNCMI), where he continued to work until becoming a professor at the Technical University of Munich in 1980. He has been a director of the Max Planck Institute for Solid State Research in Stuttgart since 1985.

The von Klitzing constant, R_{K} = h/e^{2} = 25812.80745... Ω, is named in honor of Klaus von Klitzing's discovery of the quantum Hall effect, and is listed in the National Institute of Standards and Technology Reference on Constants, Units, and Uncertainty. The inverse of the constant is equal to half the value of the conductance quantum.

More recently, Klitzing's research focuses on the properties of low-dimensional electronic systems, typically in low temperatures and in high magnetic fields.

== Honours and awards ==
Von Klitzing has won numerous awards and honours including:

- 1981 Walter Schottky Prize
- 1982 EPS Europhysics Prize
- 1982 Hewlett-Packard Prize
- 1985 Nobel Prize in Physics
- 1985 Directorate for life at the Max Planck Institute for Solid State Research
- 1986 Golden Plate Award of the American Academy of Achievement
- 1986 Order of Merit of Baden-Württemberg
- 1988 Honorary Doctorate from the Technical University of Karl-Marx-Stadt
- 1988 Bavarian Maximilian Order for Science and Art
- 1988 Dirac Medal and Lecture of the University of New South Wales
- 1992 Honorary Degree (Doctor of Science) from the University of Bath
- 1999 Honorary Member of the German Physical Society
- 2003 Elected a Foreign Member of the Royal Society (ForMemRS)
- 2003 Honorary Doctorate of the Technical University of Munich Department of Physics
- 2005 Carl Friedrich Gauss Medal of the Brunswick Scientific Society
- 2006 Honorary Doctorate of the University of Oldenburg
- 2007 Member of the Chinese Academy of Sciences
- 2007 Member of the Pontifical Academy of Sciences
- 2009 Austrian Decoration for Science and Art
- 2012 Distinguished Affiliated Professor at the Technical University of Munich
- 2016 Honoris Causa Doctorate of the Universidad Nacional de San Martín
- 2019 Pour le Mérite for Sciences and Arts
- Professor von Klitzing Strasse in Quakenbrück and Klaus von Klitzing Strasse in Landau are named after von Klitzing
- 2019 Fray International Sustainability Award given at SIPS 2019 by FLOGEN Star Outreach
