= Wilhelm Martin =

German-Dutch art historian (1876–1954)

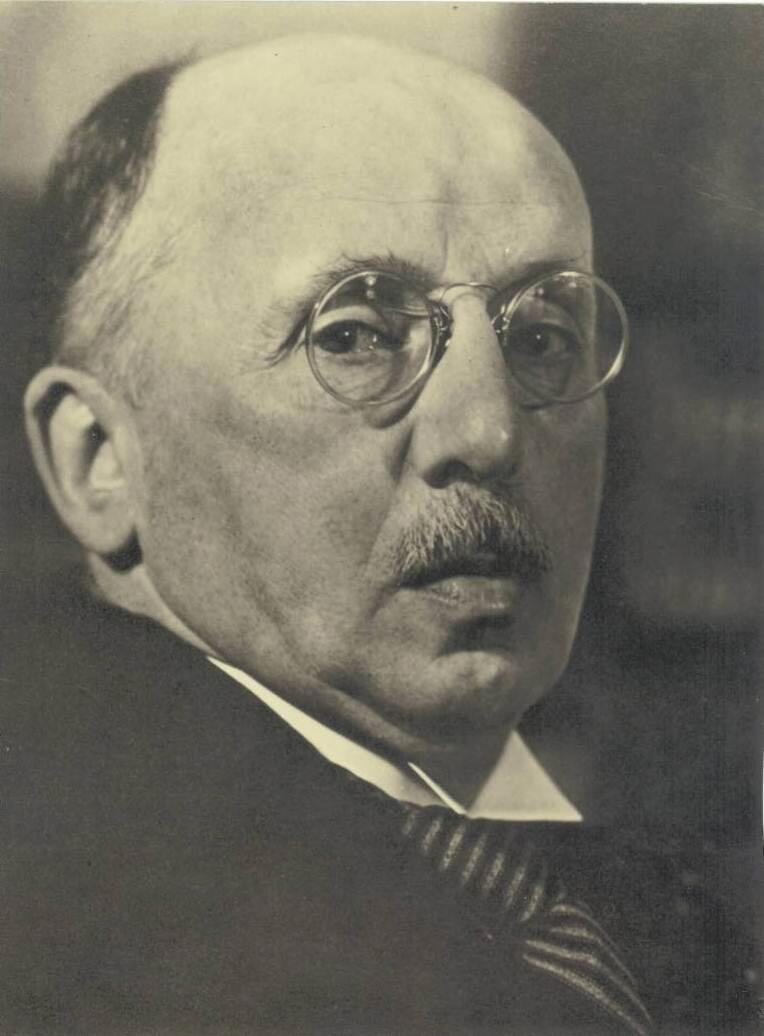
Wilhelm Martin (1933)

Wilhelm Martin (20 June 1876 – 10 March 1954) was a German-Dutch art historian.

Wilhelm Martin was born in 1876 in Quakenbrück, Germany as the son of Karl Martin, a geologist, and Ana Fittica. When his father became a professor at the University of Leiden in 1877, the family moved to the Netherlands. Wilhelm's two younger brothers, Herman Martin (1881–1968, director of the Fries Museum) and Hans Martin (1886–1964, a writer) were both born in the Netherlands.

Wilhelm Martin successfully studied Arts at the University of Leiden between 1894 and 1899, and became a Ph.D. in 1901 with his study Het leven en de werken van Gerrit Dou beschouwd in verband met het schildersleven van zijn tijd, the first purely art historical doctorate in the Netherlands.

Also in 1901, Martin became vice-director of the Mauritshuis museum in The Hague under Abraham Bredius. Martin specialized in Dutch Golden Age painting, i.e. 17th-century Dutch painting. In 1904 he started giving private lessons at the University of Leiden.

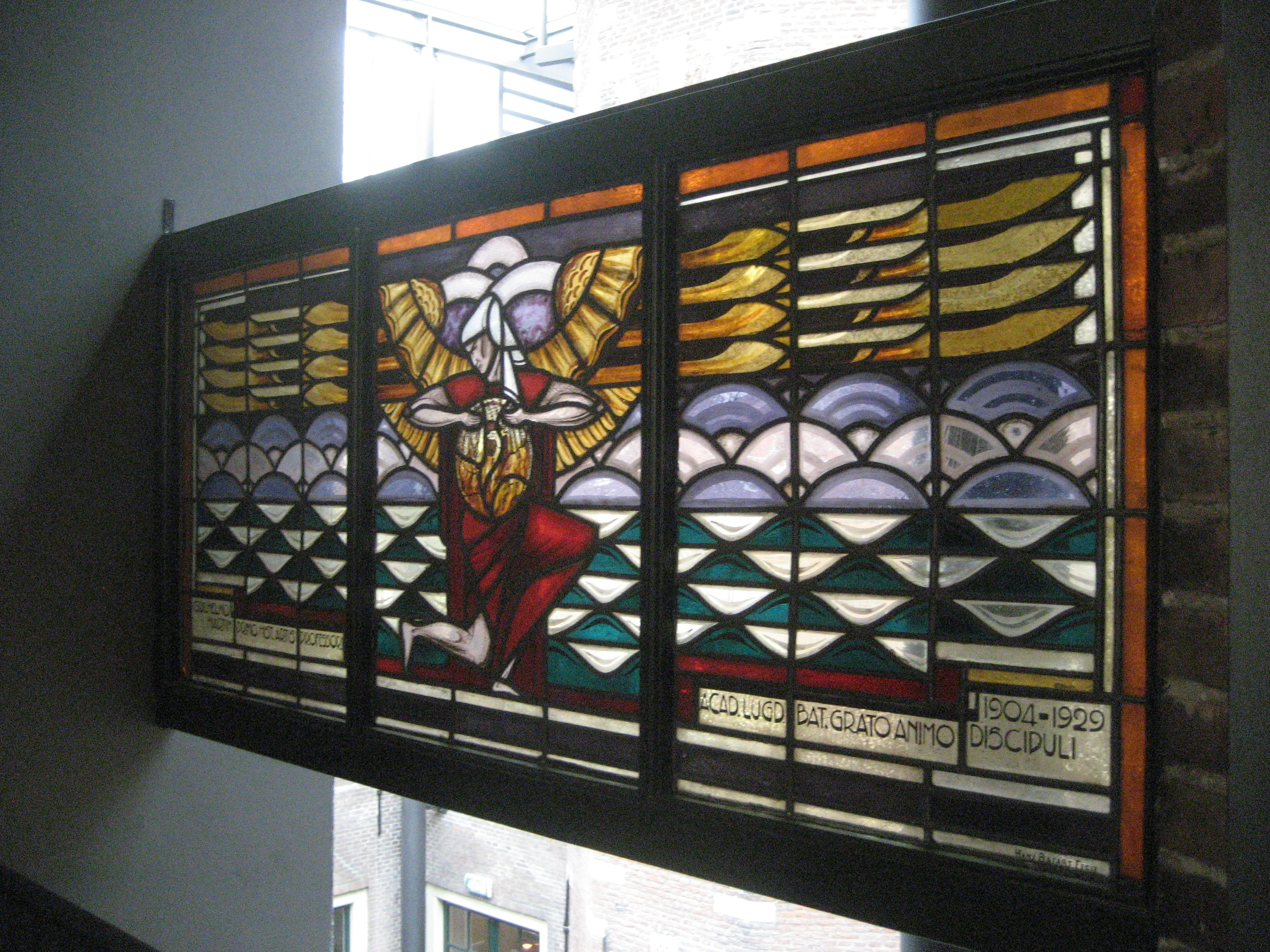
Stained glass window in honour of Wilhelm Martin (Academy Building Leiden)

On 9 August 1906, he married Maria Cornelia Visser. They had three daughters and one son. In 1907, Martin became extraordinary professor of art history at the University of Leiden. In 1909, Martin succeeded Bredius as the director of the Mauritshuis, which he remained for 36 years. He published a second book on Gerrit Dou in 1912, together with E. W. Moes two parts of Oude Schilderkunst in Nederland (Ancient painting in the Netherlands) in 1912 and 1914, and scientific catalogues of the Mauritshuis collection in 1914 and 1915.

In 1918, Martin published Alt-holländische Bilder (Old Netherlandic Images), with a revised reprint in 1921. It was aimed at collectors and contained advice on conservation and restoration. Meanwhile, he also published some sorks on 19th-century Dutch painters, including the 1915 Albert Neuhuys, zijn leven en zijn kunst, in 1917 together with G. H. Marius Johannes Bosboom, 1817–1891, and in 1921 Thérèse van Duyl-Schwartze. 1851–1918. Gedenkboek.

He wrote studies on Jan Steen in 1924, 1926 and 1954. His major work, De Hollandsche schilderkunst in de zeventiende eeuw (Dutch painting in the seventeenth century), appeared in two parts in 1935–1936.

In 1934, he also became the director of the Museum Mesdag, which he remained until his death in 1954. In 1935, he became director of the Prentenkabinet (Print cabinet) of the University of Leiden. In 1942, during the German occupation of the Netherlands, he gave his resignation from the University: it was accepted in 1943, although he stayed as director of the Prentenkabinet. He retired as director of the Mauritshuis in 1945, only to return for one year in 1946–1947 when his successor suddenly left. He published a few more works, including a 1947 work on The Night Watch and a 1950 picture book on Dutch painting of the second half of the seventeenth century.

In between his career as an academic, director and writer of art historical books, he contributed to the organisation of exhibitions, was a member of different committees on Dutch Museums and Dutch Heritage, and wrote articles for many magazines, including The Burlington Magazine and Elsevier.
