= Grada Hermina Marius =

Dutch painter (1854–1919)

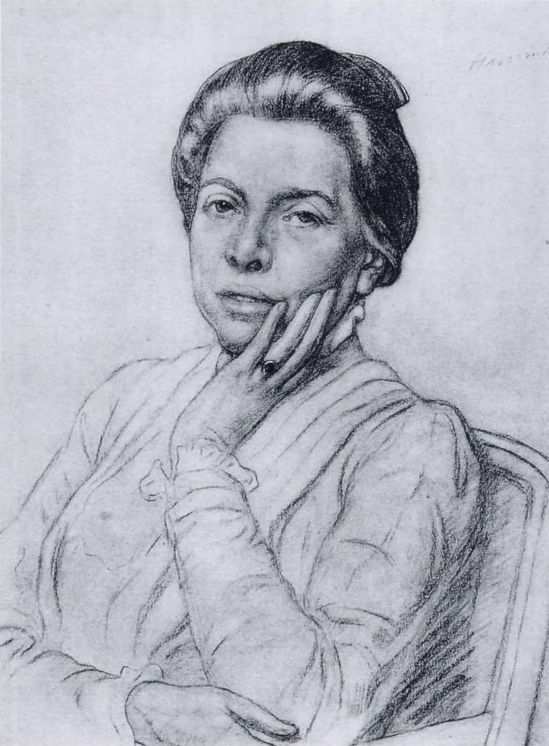
- Portrait by H.J. Haverman
- Born: 7 June 1854; Hengelo
- Died: 8 November 1919 (aged 65); The Hague

Grada Hermina Marius or G.H. Marius (June 7, 1854 – November 8, 1919) was a Dutch writer and painter.

Marius was born in Hengelo but was trained under Jan Striening (1827-1903) in Deventer. She then moved to Amsterdam where she trained under August Allebé. In 1883 she settled in the Hague, where she became an art critic as well as continuing to draw and paint as a member of Pulchri Studio. She lived with her brother's family, and after he died in 1903 she stayed in the house with his surviving family and earned a living with her books, which were well received.

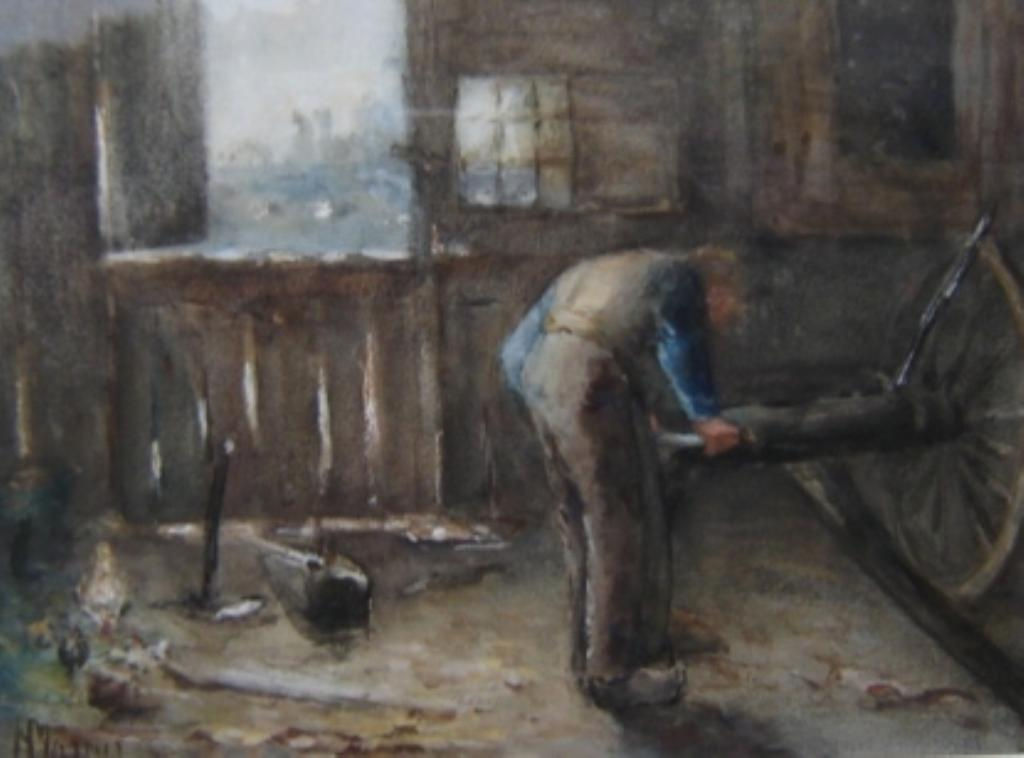
The Wagoneer

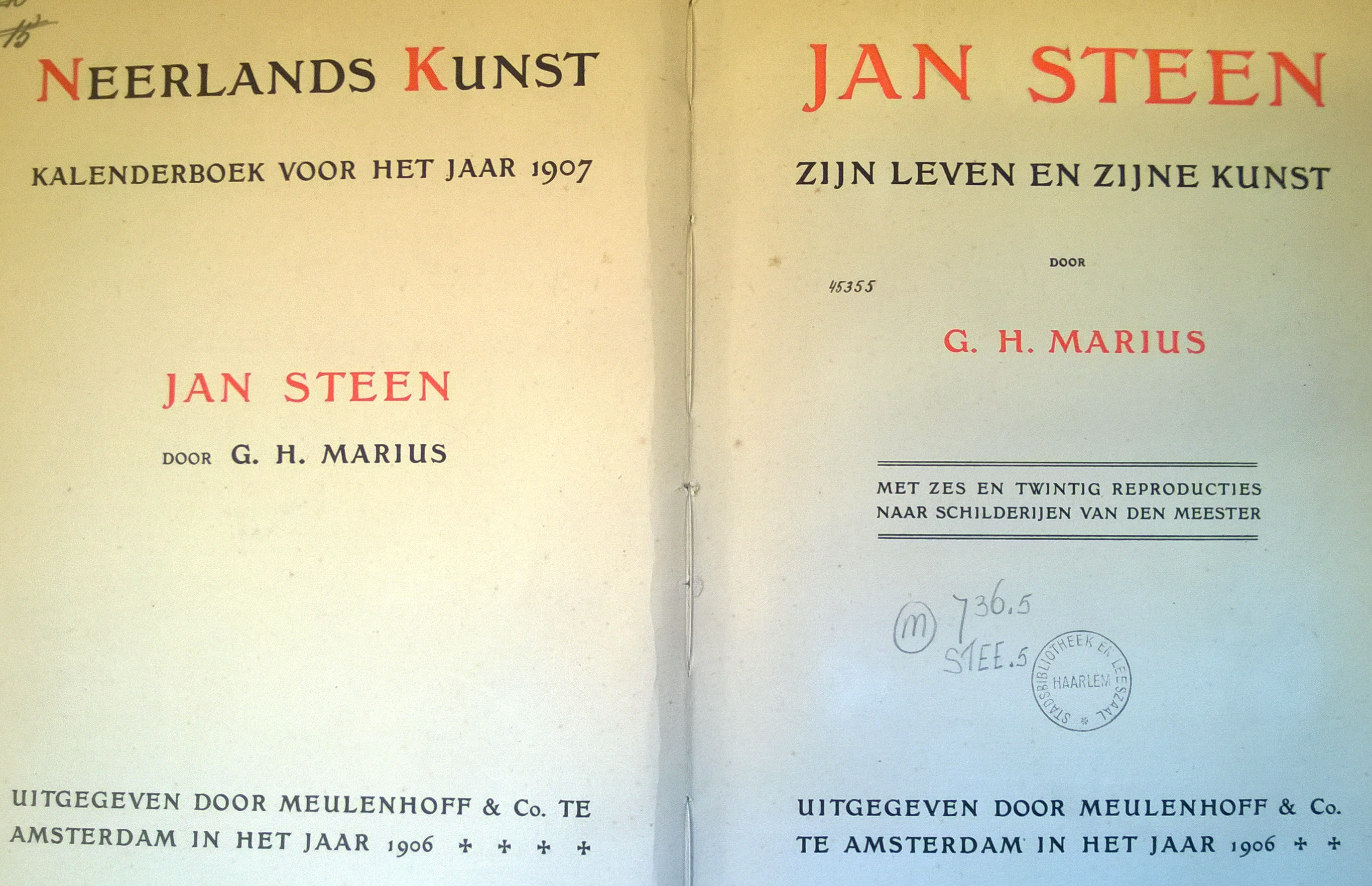
1907 calendar of Jan Steen paintings

Marius died in The Hague.

== Works ==
- 1899 John Ruskin. Een inleiding tot zijn werken, introduction to his work
- 1903 De Hollandsche schilderkunst in de negentiende eeuw, comprehensive book that was later translated
- 1905 Rembrandt. Een boek voor jong Holland, a children's book about Rembrandt
- 1906 Jan Steen. Zijn leven en zijne kunst, a 1907 illustrated desk calendar
- 1906 Die holländische Malerei im neunzehnten Jahrhunderts, translated into German from her 1903 book
- 1908 Dutch painting in the nineteenth century, translated into English from her 1903 book
- 1909 Het Museum Mesdag en zijne Stichters, written with the assistance of P.A.M. Boele van Hensbroek
- 1910 De schilderkunst der 19e eeuw, translation of a book from French by Léonce Bénédite.
- 1912 Jac. van Looy, part of a series on contemporary painters: Hollandsche schilders van dezen tijd
- 1917 Johannes Bosboom, written with the assistance of Wilhelm Martin
- 1920 De Hollandsche schilderkunst in de negentiende eeuw, second edition of her 1903 book in Dutch, with a foreword by W. Martin.
