= Artland Arena =

Indoor sporting arena in Quakenbrück, Germany

Coordinates: 52°40′39″N 7°57′54″E

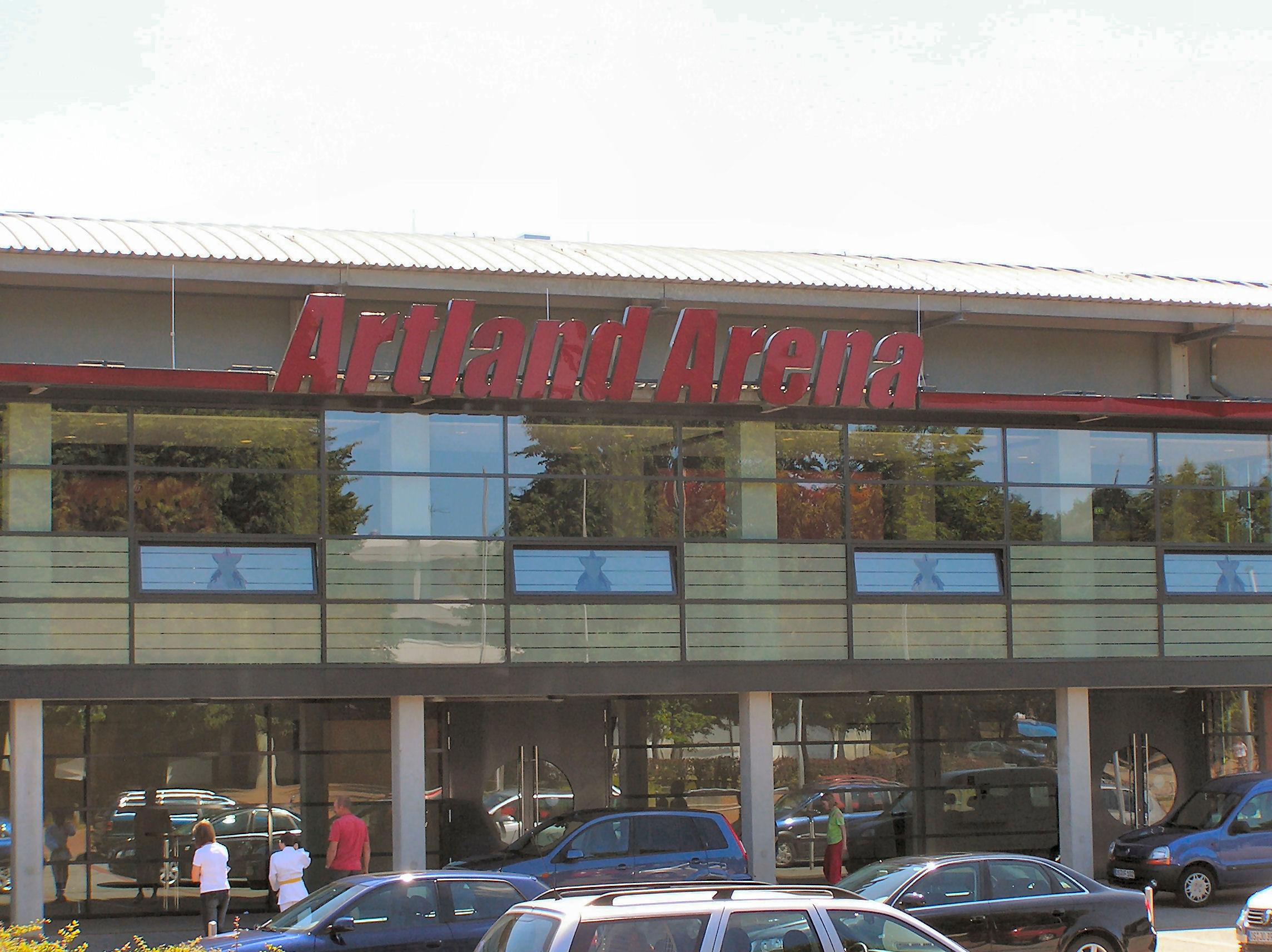
- Interactive map of Artland Arena
- Location: Quakenbrück, Germany
- Capacity: 3,200 (concerts); 3,000 (basketball)

Construction
- Opened: May 2003

Tenant
- Artland Dragons

Artland Arena is an indoor sporting arena that is located in Quakenbrück, Germany. The seating capacity of the arena for basketball games is 3,000 people, of which 2,812 seats are permanent, and 200 seats are temporary. It is currently home to the German League professional basketball team Artland Dragons.
