= Badbergen =

- Municipality
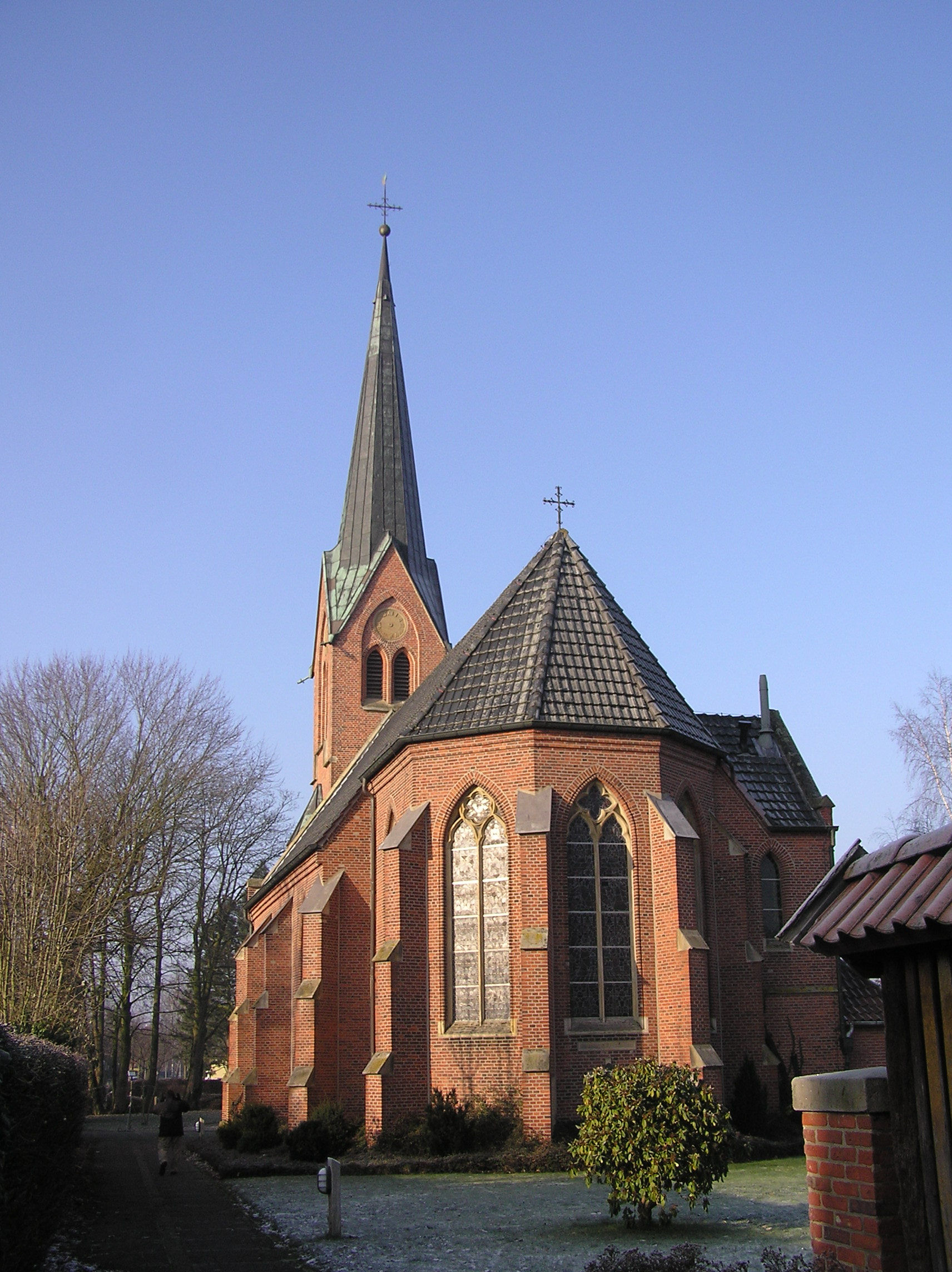
- Saint Mary's Church

- Coat of arms

- Location of Badbergen within Osnabrück district
- Interactive map of Badbergen
- Location within Germany Location within Lower Saxony
- Coordinates: 52°38′06″N 07°58′56″E
- Country: Germany
- State: Lower Saxony
- District: Osnabrück
- Municipal assoc.: Artland
- Subdivisions: 9

Government
  - Mayor: Tobias Dörfler (CDU)

Area
  - Total: 79.11 km^{2} (30.54 sq mi)
- Elevation: 29 m (95 ft)

Population (2025-12-31)
  - Total: 4,285
  - Density: 54.17/km^{2} (140.3/sq mi)
- Time zone: UTC+01:00 (CET)
  - Summer (DST): UTC+02:00 (CEST)
- Postal codes: 49635
- Dialling codes: 05433
- Vehicle registration: OS, BSB, MEL, WTL
- Website: www.badbergen.de

Badbergen (German pronunciation: [baːtˈbɛʁɡn̩]; Low German: Badbern) is a municipality in the district of Osnabrück, in Lower Saxony, Germany. It lies on the River Hase.

== Subdivision ==
The municipality consists of the central and eponymous village of Badbergen, the village of Groß Mimmelage in the north-west (630 inhabitants), the small village of Grönloh (270 inhabitants) and the rural scattered settlements of Grothe, Langen, Lechterke, Vehs, Wehdel, Wohld and Wulften.
