= Yalta International Economic Forum =

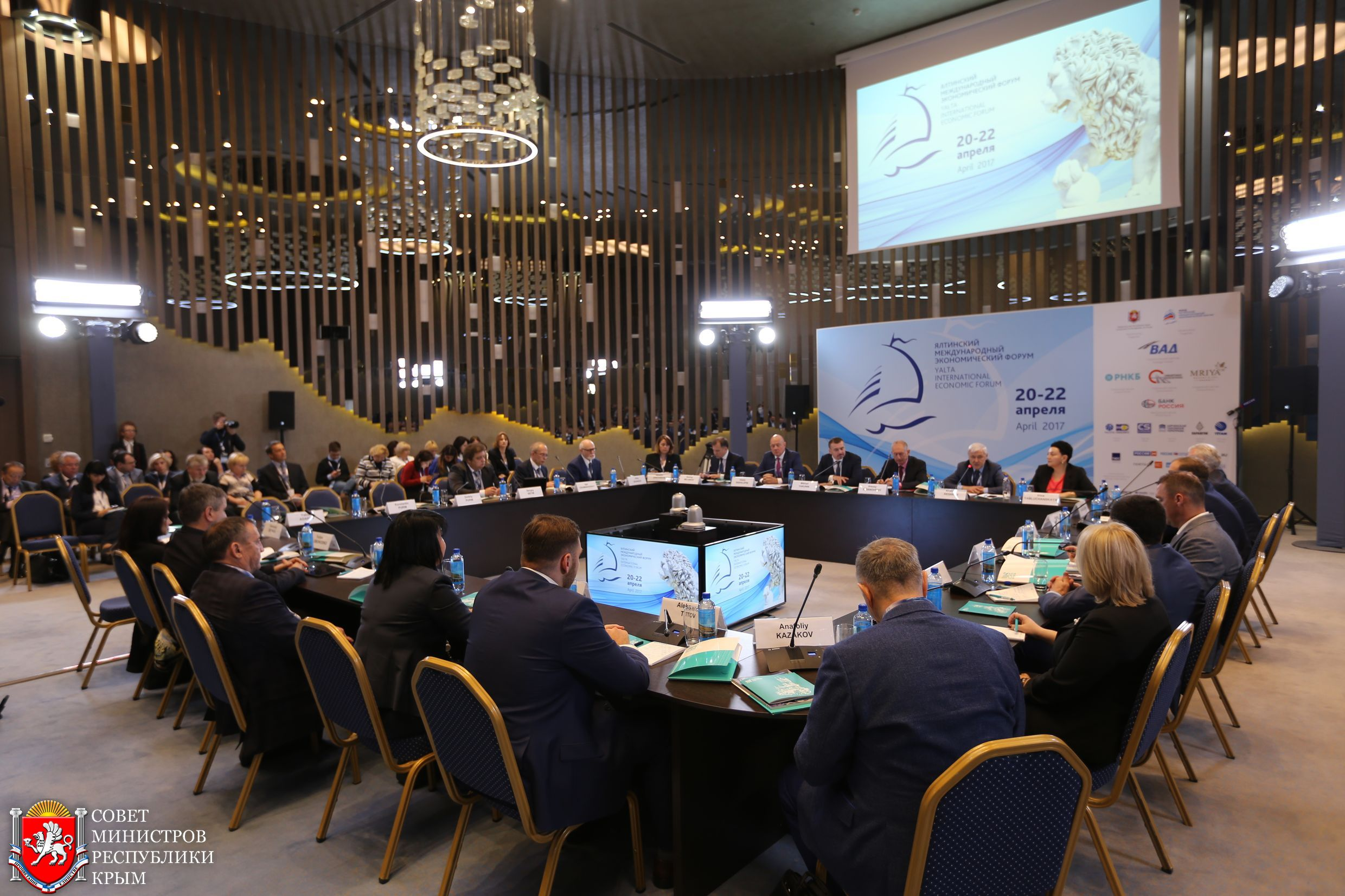
2017 Yalta International Economic Forum

The Yalta International Economic Forum (shortened as YIEF) is an annual business event held in Yalta on the Crimea Peninsula since 2015. It is considered the fourth largest Russian economic forum, after the Petersburg International Economic Forum, the Eastern Economic Forum and the Sochi Investment Forum. The forum is sponsored by the local Government of the Republic of Crimea and the Yalta International Economic Forum Fund, all Russian sources.

The YIEF sees itself as an international venue for discussing socio-economic development issues, for Russia and the world economy as a whole.

According to the organizers, the forum is attended by Russian government officials, international experts, Russian business people and economists, as well as representatives of business organisations and other thinkers. One theme of the forums discussions, is the focus on diversification from Energy and boosting competitiveness of the Russian economy.

== History ==
In August 2015 the Yalta International Economic Forum Foundation was established by the Ministry of Justice in the Republic of Crimea, with assistance by the Council of Ministers of the Republic along with support by the Russian Presidential Administration. The first forum was held in 2015, which was considered a success by participants and the Foundation, transforming the single event into an annual one by a following decision.

In the year 2017, 2200 participants from 46 countries had visited the event. Followed by 2018 which is excepted to have over 3000 participants from more than 60 countries. One of the topics in 2018 were crypto currencies.
