= Heinrich Beythien =

Heinrich Friedrich Wilhelm Beythien (13 February 1873, in Quakenbrück – 17 March 1952, in Berlin-Wilmersdorf) was a German politician and functionary of the DVP and Nazi Party (NSDAP). He was a member of the IV. German Reichstag of the Weimar Republic.

Heinrich Beythien was born on 13 February 1873, the son of a bookbinder in Quakenbrück. After visiting the elementary school and the grammar school in his hometown, he graduated in 1888 an apprenticeship and made after military service at Hanover Train Battalion. 10. After that, he took over the management of the Hannoversche homeowners and property owners association, which he held until 1923. In addition, since 1898 he worked in discount savings Voluntary Sector and was one of the founders of the Association of trade defense and discount savings clubs in Germany, representative of Trade and Industry, based in Hannover, whose business he conducted since then. Beythien took over 1917 also the office of President of the Reich Federation of Associations of the German Retail Grocery Trade. In addition, he was managing director of the Association of the distillery owners and Preßhefefabrikanten Germany in Berlin and board member of the German Business Association and the International Association for the Study of the conditions of the middle class in Brussels . As such, he has lectured on international SME meetings in Vienna, Paris and Munich . Heinrich Beythien died on 17 March 1952 in Berlin-Wilmersdorf. Heinrich Beythien was married to Louise Faber, with whom he had three daughters and three sons. His brother Adolf Beythien was a chemist and Director of the Chemical Investigation Office of the city of Dresden.

== Party ==
Beythien joined after the November Revolution to the DVP and was elected to the Central Committee of the Party. In 1933 he joined the NSDAP one from which it was excluded in 1936.

== Deputy ==
Beythien was 1919-1923 Alderman (member of the civil ruler College) in Hannover, while Senator of the city. In the general election in June 1920 he was in the German Reichstag voted, where he remained until July 1932nd In Parliament he represented the constituency Osthannover. He was also a member of the Inter-Parliamentary Union .

== Literature ==
- Reich Manual of the German Society - The Handbook of personalities in words and pictures, Volume, German economic Verlag, Berlin 1930, S. 131. Microfiche -Issue, Munich: Saur, undated. ISBN 3-598-30664-4
