= Quakenbrück =

- Town
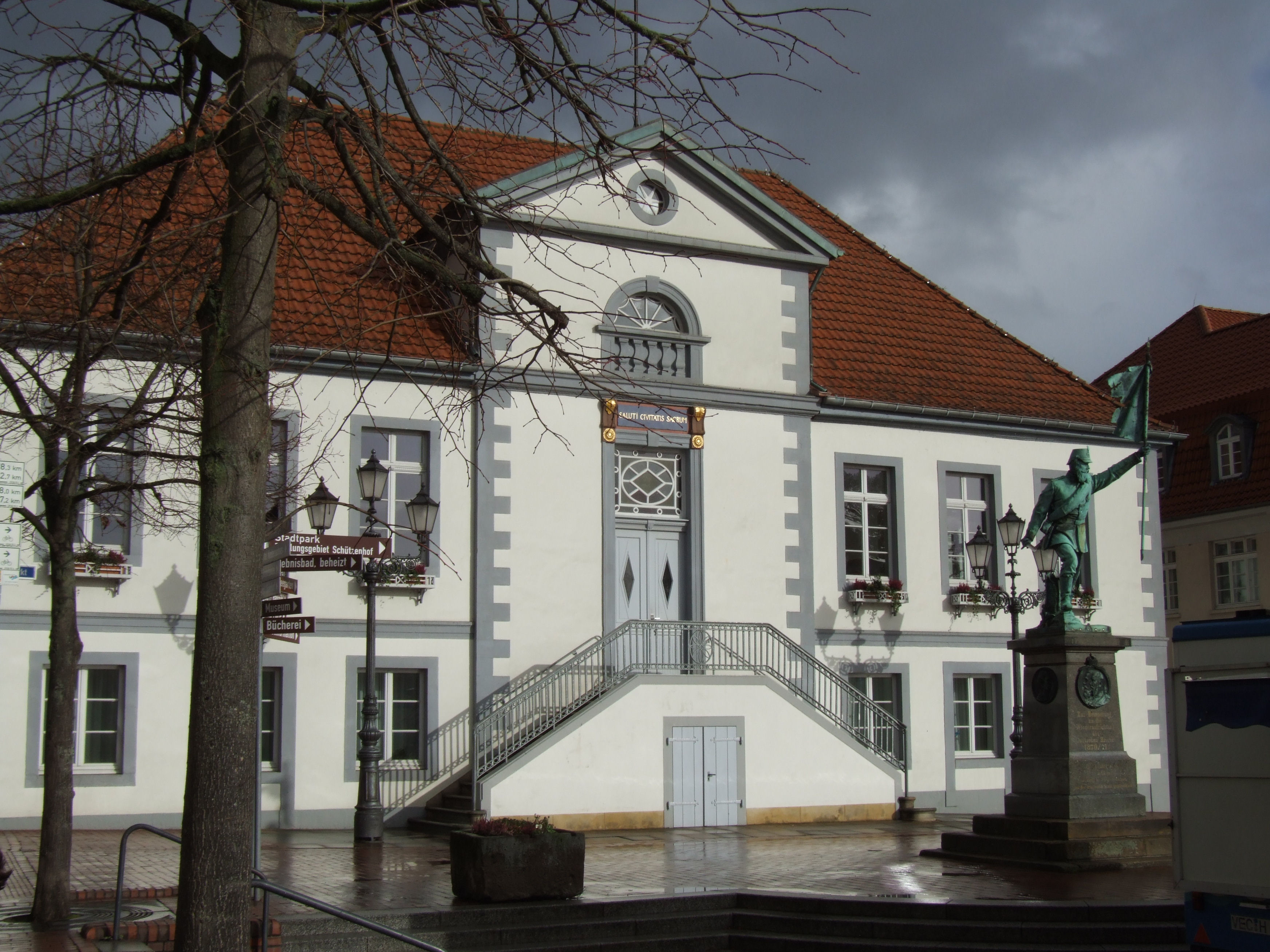
- Town hall by the market square

- Coat of arms

- Location of Quakenbrück within Osnabrück district
- Interactive map of Quakenbrück
- Location within Germany Location within Lower Saxony
- Coordinates: 52°40′38″N 07°57′27″E
- Country: Germany
- State: Lower Saxony
- District: Osnabrück
- Municipal assoc.: Artland

Government
  - Mayor: Tülay Tsolak (SPD)

Area
  - Total: 17.96 km^{2} (6.93 sq mi)
- Elevation: 24 m (79 ft)

Population (2025-12-31)
  - Total: 14,088
  - Density: 784.4/km^{2} (2,032/sq mi)
- Time zone: UTC+01:00 (CET)
  - Summer (DST): UTC+02:00 (CEST)
- Postal codes: 49610
- Dialling codes: 05431
- Vehicle registration: OS, BSB, MEL, WTL
- Website: www.quakenbrueck.de

Quakenbrück (German pronunciation: [ˈkvaːkn̩bʁʏk]; Low German: Quokenbrügge) is a town in the district of Osnabrück, in Lower Saxony, Germany. It is situated on the river Hase. It is part of the Samtgemeinde ("collective municipality") of Artland.

== History ==
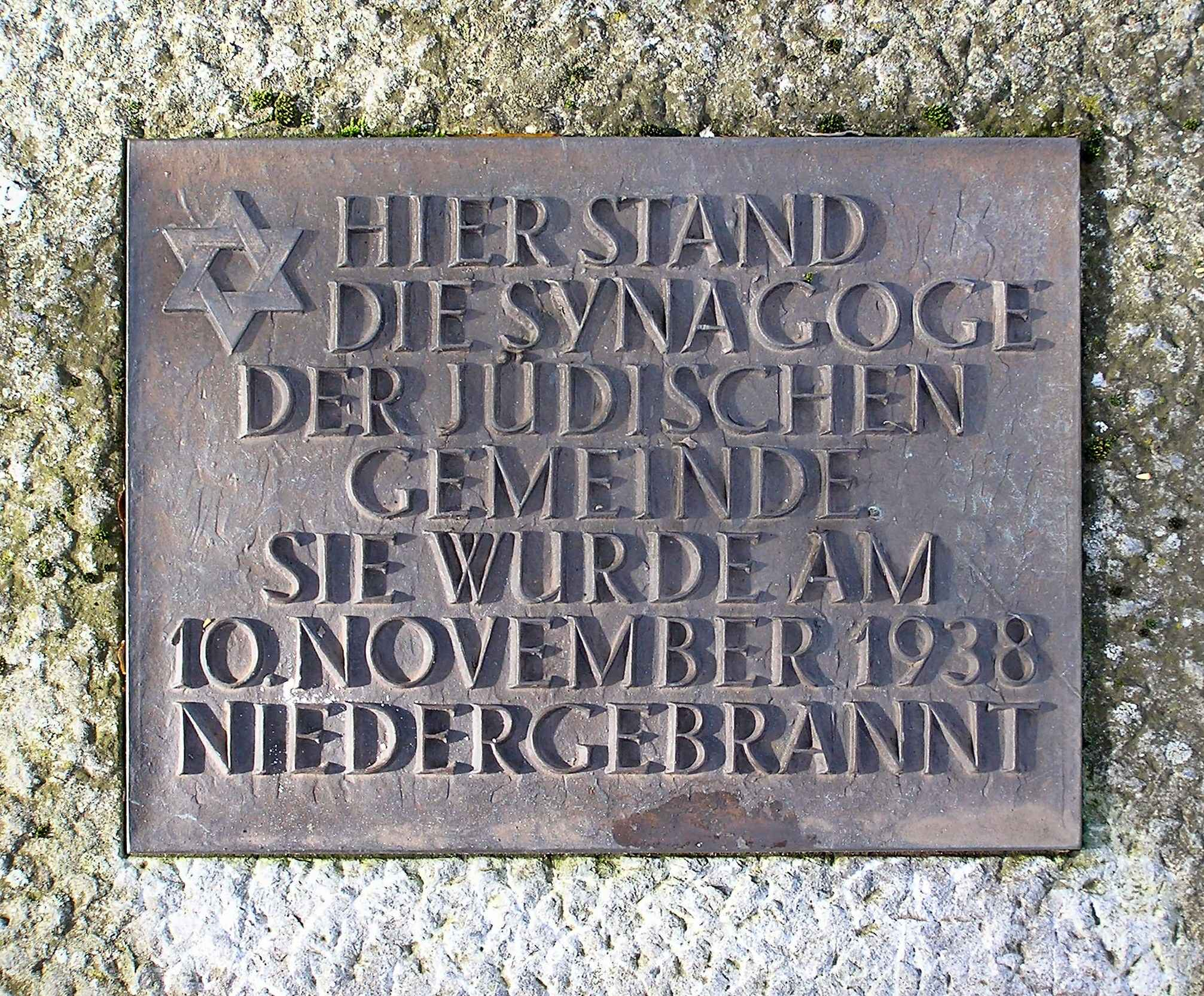
Memorial plate on the synagogue

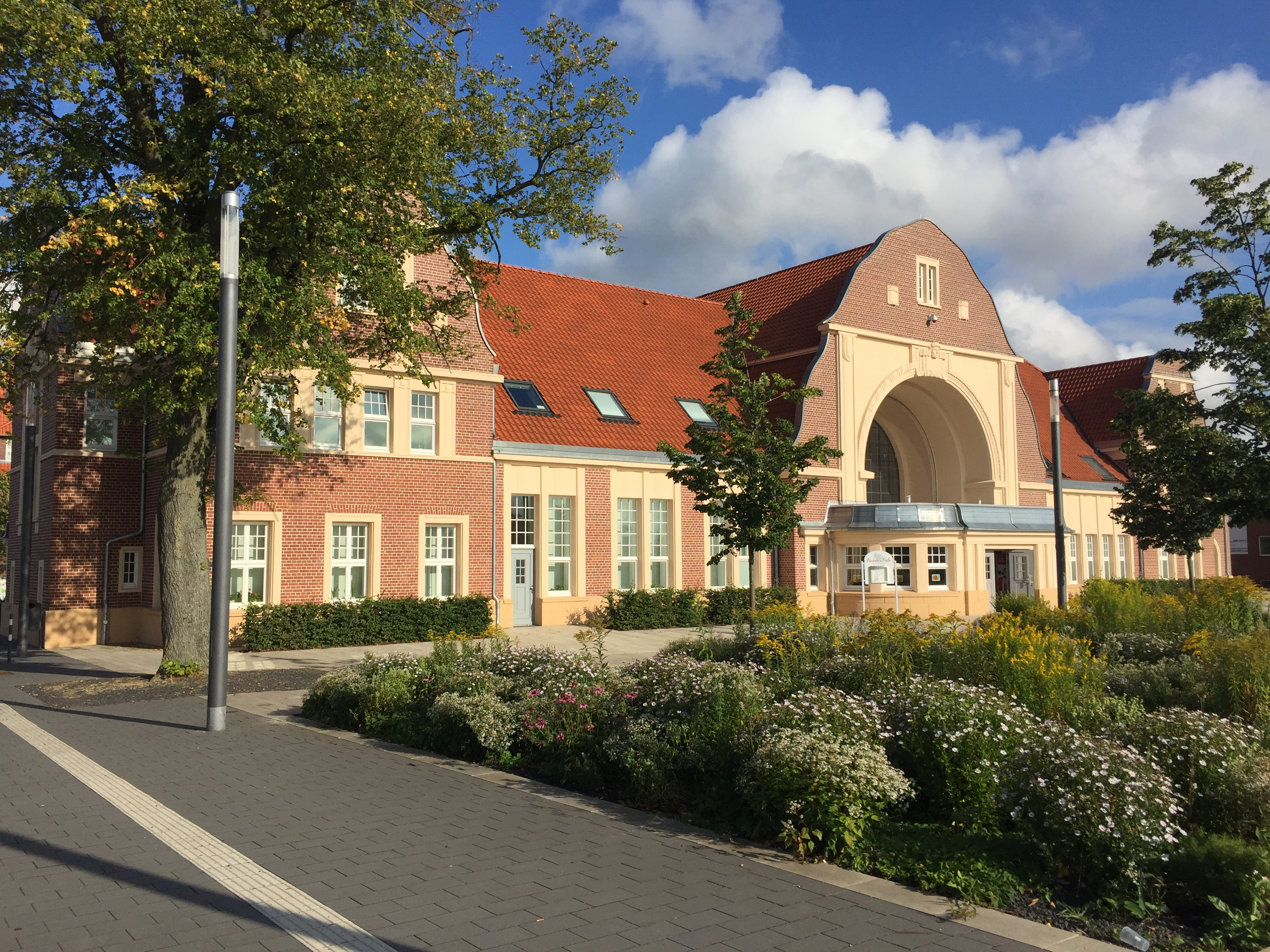
Quakenbrück station

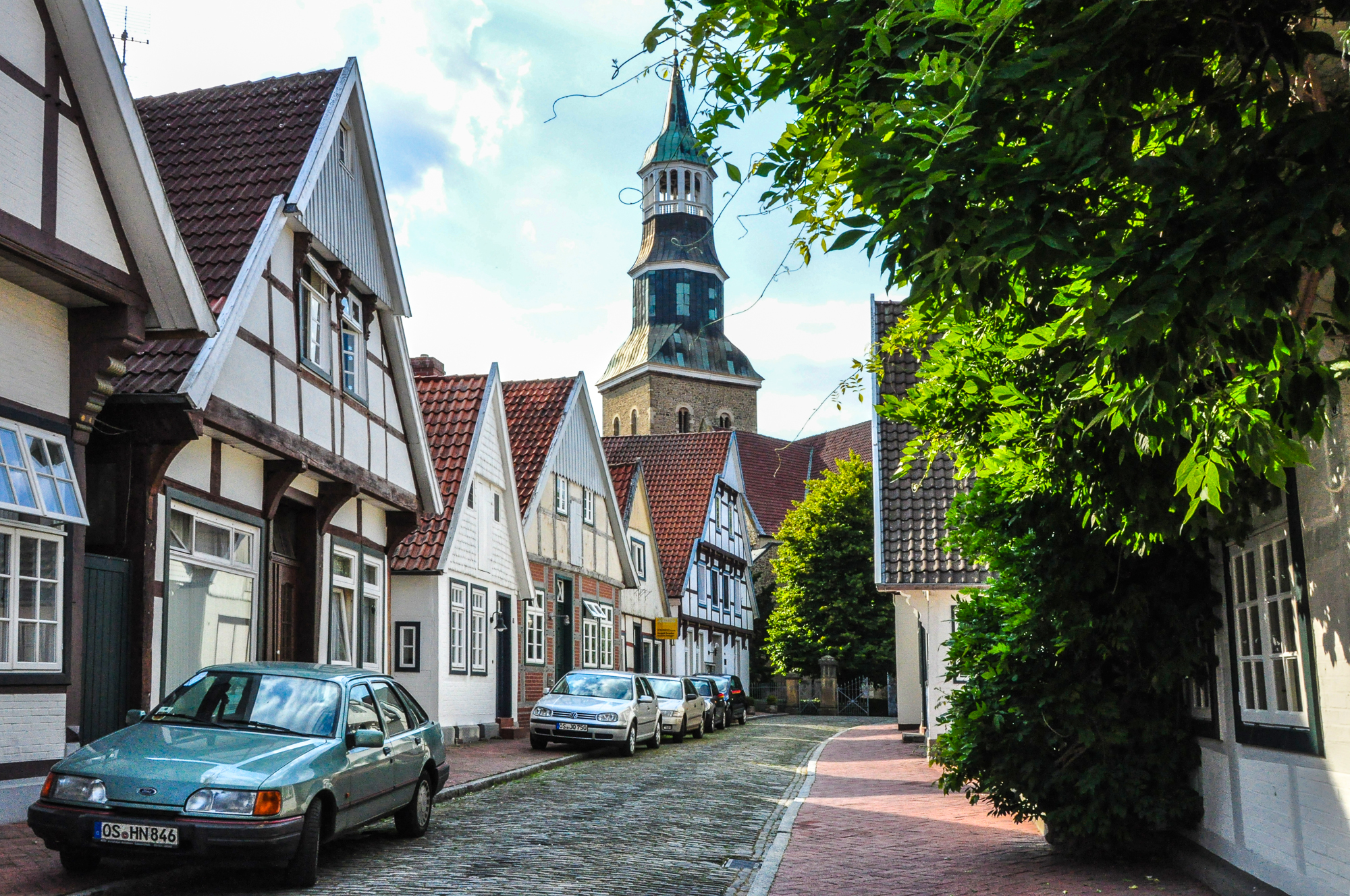
Church of St. Sylvester

Quakenbrück was founded in 1234 by the Bishop of Osnabrück, according to the earliest documents, although the area had been settled previously. It served as a border to the north of Osnabrück.

On 29 May 1916, a nail man made from French poplar was given to the town by Clemens Freiherr von Schorlemer-Lieser and placed in the meeting room of the town hall. Revenue from the statue, which depicted a 13th-14th-century knight clad in armor and holding a shield and a sword and has come to be known as the Quakenbrück iron Knight (Quakenbrücker Eiserner Burgmann), were used to fuel the war effort. The statue was built by two soldiers from Schorlemer's Battalion.

== Climate ==
Temperate coastal climate is affected by damp NW winds from the North Sea. The long term average air temperature in Quakenbrück is 8.5–9.0 °C (47.3–48.2 °F) with an average rainfall of 700 mm (28 in). Between May and August, there are about 20–25 days during which temperatures may reach over 25 °C (77 °F).

== Sport ==
Quakenbrück has a professional basketball team, the Artland Dragons. The Dragons finished as Runners-up during the 2007 Basketball Bundesliga season and won the German Cup in 2008.

== Mayors ==
- till 1968: Aloys Geers (SPD)
- 1968–1972: Karl Möller (CDU)
- 1972–1979: Horst Magnus (CDU)
- 1979–1988: Werner Korfhage (FDP)
- 1988–1991: Jürgen Gadeberg (SPD)
- 1991–2000: Klaus Alves (CDU)
- 2000–2011: Wolfgang Becker (CDU)
- 2011–2014: Claus Peter Poppe (SPD)
- 2014–2016: Paul Gärtner (SPD)
- 2016–2021: Matthias Brüggemann (CDU)
- Since 2021: Tülay Tsolak (SPD)

== Twin towns – sister cities ==
Quakenbrück is twinned with:

- Alençon, France
- Conway, United States
- Dobre Miasto, Poland
- Wesenberg, Germany

== Notable people ==
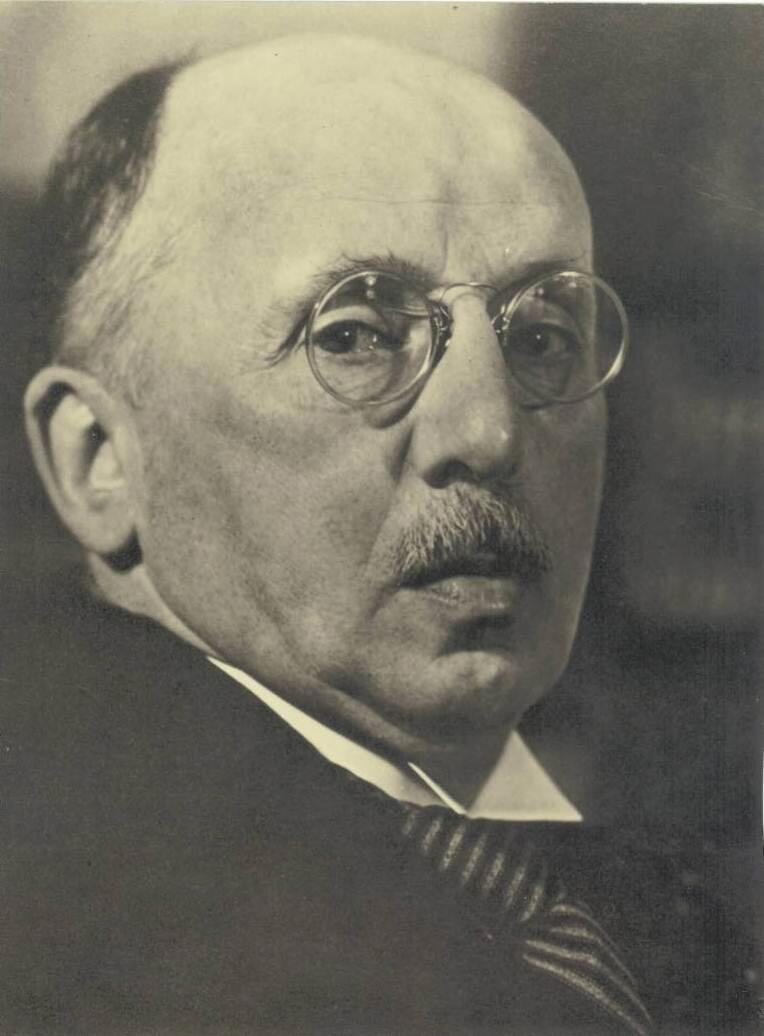
Wilhelm Martin, 1933

- Friedrich Ebert (1871–1925), politician (SPD), first president of Germany from 1919 until 1925; he worked in a local saddlery in 1891
- Heinrich Beythien (1873–1952), economist and Nazi Party politician
- Wilhelm Martin (1876–1954), German-Dutch art historian
- Wilhelm Bendow (1884–1950), actor, local school pupil in 1905/06
- Enno Patalas (1929–2018), film historian and critic
- Holger Czukay (1938–2017), musician, was a music teacher at the local Artland-Gymnasium
- Klaus von Klitzing (born 1943), physicist, awarded the Nobel Prize in Physics in 1985, went to local Artland-Gymnasium
- Hans-Gert Pöttering (born 1945), politician (CDU), president of the European Parliament, local school graduate
- Claus Peter Poppe (born 1948), local politician; headmaster of the local Artland-Gymnasium in 1995–2003
- Ulrike Rodust (born 1949), former local politician (SPD); MEP from 2008 until 2019
- Justus Haucap (born 1969), economist, professor at University of Düsseldorf
- Andreas Maurer (born 1970), local politician convicted of electoral fraud, member of the town council 2006–2019
- Christian Brand (born 1972), football player and manager, played over 240 games
- Cinta Laura (born 1993), Indonesian actress
