= Artland =

- Samtgemeinde
- Coat of arms

- Location of Artland within Osnabrück district
- Interactive map of Artland
- Location within Germany Location within Lower Saxony
- Coordinates: 52°40′34″N 07°57′26″E
- Country: Germany
- State: Lower Saxony
- District: Osnabrück
- Founded: 1972
- Subdivisions: 4 municipalities

Government
  - Mayor (2021–26): Michael Bürgel (SPD)

Area
  - Total: 189.32 km^{2} (73.10 sq mi)
- Elevation: 24 m (79 ft)

Population (2025-12-31)
  - Total: 23,600
  - Density: 125/km^{2} (323/sq mi)
- Time zone: UTC+01:00 (CET)
  - Summer (DST): UTC+02:00 (CEST)
- Postal codes: 49601
- Dialling codes: 05431
- Vehicle registration: OS, BSB, MEL, WTL
- Website: www.artland.de

Artland is a Samtgemeinde ("collective municipality") in the district of Osnabrück, in Lower Saxony, Germany. It is situated along the river Hase, approx. 45 km north of Osnabrück, and 25 km west of Vechta. Its seat is the town Quakenbrück.

The Samtgemeinde Artland consists of the following municipalities:

- Badbergen
- Menslage
- Nortrup
- Quakenbrück
